= Sigma Films =

Scottish film production company

- Notable work: Outlaw King; Starred Up; Perfect Sense; Hallam Foe; Young Adam; The Legend of Barney Thomson; Under the Skin; Red Road; Dogville; Swung; Citadel
- Website: http://www.sigmafilms.com

Sigma Films is a film production company based in Glasgow, Scotland. The company was formed in 1996 by Gillian Berrie, David Mackenzie and Alastair Mackenzie – a producer, director and actor respectively. Over the last twenty years the company has been responsible for film releases including Starred Up (2013), Under the Skin (2013), Perfect Sense (2011), Hallam Foe (2007), Red Road (2006), Young Adam (2003) and Dear Frankie (2004). In 2017, Sigma began production on big-budget historical epic Outlaw King for Netflix.

The company regularly co-produces films with international partners such as Lars von Trier's company Zentropa Entertainments – including Dogville (2003), Manderlay (2005), After the Wedding (2006), Dear Wendy (2004), Brothers (2004) and Wilbur Wants to Kill Himself (2002).

Sigma have their production and post-production facility at Film City Glasgow.

== History ==
Gillian Berrie began by making David Mackenzie's short films California Sunshine (1997) and Somersault (2000) before she went on to produce Mackenzie's debut feature The Last Great Wilderness (2002). The film stars Alastair Mackenzie and was co-produced by Zentropa and premiered in Toronto in 2002.

Following their first feature, David Mackenzie directed Young Adam (2003) starring Ewan McGregor and Tilda Swinton. The film premiered at Cannes Film Festival 2003 in the Un Certain Regard competition and won Best Film and Best Director at the 2003 BAFTA Scotland Awards.

Meanwhile, Sigma strengthened links with co-producer Zentropa, developing the Advance Party Project created from an idea by Gillian Berrie, Sisse Graum Jorgensen, and Lars von Trier. Advance Party was specifically designed to break feature film debutant directors into the industry and produced Andrea Arnold's Red Road (2006) and Morag MacKinnon's Donkeys (2010). Both films star a mixture of the same characters and cast including Kate Dickie, Martin Compston, Natalie Press, Tony Curran and James Cosmo. Red Road played in the Palme d'Or competition at Cannes Film Festival in 2006, winning the Jury Prize, whilst Donkeys won Best Film at the 2011 BAFTA Scotland Awards.

Gillian and David's second feature film collaboration was Hallam Foe (2007), starring Jamie Bell and Sophia Myles. It won many awards including a Silver Bear in Berlin 2007, the Golden Hitchcock and Kodak Award for Cinematography at the Dinard Festival of British Cinema 2007, and the 2008 National Board of Review Award for Top Independent Film, as well as numerous other nominations including for Bell and Myles' performances.

Sigma and Zentropa collaborated again to make David Mackenzie's sixth feature film, sci-fi romance Perfect Sense (2011). The film follows a burgeoning romance between Ewan McGregor and Eva Green against the backdrop of a global epidemic of people losing their senses one by one. The film premiered at the Sundance Film Festival in 2011 and picked up numerous awards at film festivals around the world including Edinburgh, Bratislava and Philadelphia International Film Festivals.

Immediately after Perfect Sense, Mackenzie directed the comedy musical You Instead (2011) [released as Tonight You're Mine in the US] starring Luke Treadaway and Natalie Tena. Astonishingly it was filmed over four and a half days at the Scottish music festival T in the Park in 2010 where the cast and crew had to adopt a kind of guerrilla filmmaking approach to shoot amidst the chaos of a music festival alongside over 100,000 revellers. It premiered at both T in the Park in 2011 and at Austin's SXSW.

Sigma's Brian Coffey collaborated with Irish production company Blinder Films to produce Ciaran Foy's Citadel (2012). Foy's involvement in the film was a result of Advance Party II. The film stars Aneurin Barnard and James Cosmo and it premiered at SXSW 2012 where it won the Midnighter Audience Award.

Next, Sigma produced Starred Up (2013), again directed by David Mackenzie and starring Jack O'Connell alongside Ben Mendelsohn and Rupert Friend. The story is based upon writer Jonathan Asser's real-life experiences as a voluntary therapist in a London prison. The film was critically acclaimed and won numerous awards including the BAFTA Scotland 2014 Best Film and Best Director Awards, seven BIFA nominations and holds a remarkable 99% Rotten Tomatoes score.

Sigma also co-produced Jonathan Glazer's multi-award winning Under the Skin (2013) starring Scarlett Johansson. The majority of the film was shot undercover with hidden cameras and non-actors in real locations in Scotland. The film had its World Premiere at Telluride at the same time as Starred Up, then played Venice Film Festival and has since won over 20 awards and 90 nominations all over the world.

More recently, Brian Coffey at Sigma produced Robert Carlyle's directorial debut The Legend of Barney Thomson starring Carlyle, Emma Thompson and Ray Winstone. The film opened the 2015 Edinburgh International Film Festival and won Best Film at the 2015 Scottish BAFTAs. Coffey also produced director Colin Kennedy's first-feature, Swung (2015), starring Elena Anaya, Owen McDonnell and Elizabeth McGovern also premiered at EIFF and received nominations at the BAFTA Scotland Awards.

Coffey's latest production, supernatural horror film Hush (2017), stars Florence Pugh, Ben Lloyd-Hughes and Celia Imrie. The film was made in association with L.A. based Thruline Entertainment and is directed by Icelandic filmmaker Olaf de Fleur Johannesson.

In late 2016, Sigma begun work on a TV pilot called Damnation for the USA Network which is directed by Mackenzie and exec produced by Berrie. Described as an epic saga of the secret history of the 1930s American heartland, it chronicles the mythic conflict and bloody struggle between big money and the downtrodden, God and greed, charlatans and prophets. The show stars Logan Marshall-Green and Killian Scott. Tony Tost, James Mangold, David Mackenzie, Gillian Berrie and Entertainment 360s Guymon Casady and Daniel Rappaport executive produce for Universal Cable Productions. In May 2017, Damnation was picked up to series by the USA Network and will be released by Netflix outside of the US.

In 2017, production began on David Mackenzie's tenth feature, Outlaw King. The film stars Chris Pine as Robert the Bruce, with Aaron Taylor-Johnson playing James Douglas, Florence Pugh playing Elizabeth de Burgh and Billy Howle as Edward, the Prince of Wales. Sigma Films' Gillian Berrie is producing the historical epic which will be released internationally on Netflix.

Over the years, Sigma Films has also produced a number of up and coming director's short films including Johnny Barrington – Trout (2007) & Terra Firma (2008), Paddy Considine – Dog Altogether (2007), Jane Linfoot – Seaview (2013), and Colin Kennedy – I Love Luci (2010).

As well as nurturing writing and directing talent, Sigma regularly brings on new producers and has mentored Brian Coffey – Hush (2017), Swung (2015), The Legend of Barney Thomson (2015), Starred Up (2013), Citadel (2012), and I Love Luci (2010), and inspired Anna Duffield – Trout (2007), Dog Altogether (2007), Terra Firma (2008), Seaview (2013) & Donkeys (2010).

== Film City Glasgow ==
Gillian Berrie founded Film City Glasgow, a production and post-production facility located in the old Govan Town Hall. The project was inspired by a trip to Zentropa's 'filmbyen' ('film city' in Danish) in 2000, a film studio complex located in Hvidovre just outside Copenhagen, Denmark. At that time Glasgow desperately needed a production base for both indigenous and visiting productions. With the help of Helena Ward, Steve Inch and Lenny Crooks, Berrie secured the 65,000 square foot building which was the original Govan Town Hall and raised £3.5 million for its redevelopment.

Film City is home to post-production companies Serious and Savalas (and their Dolby theatre) and production companies including Keo, Finestripe and Hopscotch. The University of the West of Scotland also has a base there. It has also been used as a studio for film and television productions including; Jon S. Baird's Filth (2013), Lynne Ramsay's Ratcatcher (1999), David Mackenzie's Hallam Foe (2007), Shona Auerbach's Dear Frankie (2004), BBC's Mrs Brown's Boys, Frankie Boyle's Tramadol Nights, WWII zombie trilogy Outpost (2008–2013), Idris Elba starring Legacy (2010) and most recently supernatural horror film Hush (2017).

== JUMPCUT ==
Sigma founded JUMPCUT, a charity providing opportunities in the screen industries to young people. Around 25 young people aged between 16 and 25 form a production company to make a professional, budgeted short film under an intensive programme mentored by the country's leading industry professionals. 75% of JUMPCUT's alumni go on to forge careers in the film industry.

JUMPCUT's first film was sci-fi short Good Souls (2013), directed by Elizabeth Randon and starring Daniel Cahill, Finlay MacMillan, and Bobby Rainsbury. It premiered at goNORTH Festival in Inverness.

The next batch of emerging filmmaker's made Dropping Off Michael (2015), starring Brian McCardie and his nephew Michael McCardie. The film was directed by Zam Salim and picked up the audience award at the Glasgow Short Film Festival and a nomination for Best Short Film at the BAFTA Scotland 2015 Awards.

JUMPCUT's latest production, Misgivings (2016) was filmed in May 2016 at Film City Glasgow and is directed by Adrian Mead. The film was written by Jahvel Hall, starring Kathryn Howden and Scott Reid.

== Filmography ==
Film	Year	Director	Notes
Wanting and Getting	1995	David Mackenzie	Short Films
California Sunshine	1997	David Mackenzie	Short Films
Somersault	2000	David Mackenzie	Short Films
Marcie's Dowry	2000	David Mackenzie	Short Films
The Last Great Wilderness	2002	David Mackenzie	
Wilbur Wants to Kill Himself	2002	Lone Scherfig	In Association with Zentropa Entertainments
Young Adam	2003	David Mackenzie	In Association with Recorded Picture Company
Dogville	2003	Lars von Trier	Co-Production with Zentropa Entertainments
Brothers	2004	Susanne Bier	Co-Production with Zentropa Entertainments
Dear Frankie	2004	Shona Auerbach	In Association with Scorpio Films
Dear Wendy	2004	Thomas Vinterburg	Co-Production with Zentropa Entertainments
Manslaughter	2005	Per Fly	Co-Production with Zentropa Entertainments
Zozo	2005	Josef Fares	Co-Production with Zentropa Entertainments
Manderlay	2005	Lars von Trier	Co-Production with Zentropa Entertainments
The Judge	2005	Gert Fredholm	Co-Production with Zentropa Entertainments
1:1	2006	Annette K. Olesen	Co-Production with Zentropa Entertainments
When Children Play in the Sky	2006	Lorenzo Hendel	Co-Production with Zentropa Entertainments
Red Road	2006	Andrea Arnold	
After the Wedding	2006	Susanne Bier	Co-Production with Zentropa Entertainments
Trout	2007	Johnny Barrington	Short Film
Dog Altogether	2007	Paddy Considine	Short Film, Co-Production with Warp Films
Hallam Foe	2007	David Mackenzie	
Terra Firma	2008	Johnny Barrington	Short Films
I Love Luci	2010	Colin Kennedy	Short Films
Donkeys	2010	Morag MacKinnon	In Co-Operation with Advanced Party Scheme & Zentropa Entertainments
Perfect Sense	2011	David Mackenzie	In Association with Zentropa Entertainments
You Instead	2011	David Mackenzie	
Citadel	2012	Ciaran Foy	In Association with Blinder Films
Sea View	2013	Jane Linfoot	Short Film
Under the Skin	2013	Jonathan Glazer	Co-Production with Nick Wechsler Productions
Starred Up	2013	David Mackenzie	
Good Souls	2014	Elizabeth Randon	Short Film, In Association with Jumpcut
Dropping Off Michael	2015	Zam Salim	Short Film, In Association with Jumpcut
The Legend of Barney Thomson	2015	Robert Carlyle	In Association with Trinity Works Entertainment
Swung	2015	Colin Kennedy	
Misgivings	2016	Adrian Meade	Short Film, In Association with Jumpcut
Ending	2017	James Lees	Short Film
Hush	2017	Olaf de Fleur Johannesson	In Association with Thruline Entertainment
Damnation	2017	David Mackenzie	Universal Cable Productions
Outlaw King	2018	David Mackenzie	

== Awards ==
=== Academy Awards ===
Year	Nominated work	Category	Result
2007	After the Wedding	Best Foreign Language Film of the Year	Nominated

=== BAFTA Awards ===
Year	Nominated work	Category	Result
2005	Dear Frankie	Most Promising Newcomer (Shona Auerbach)	Nominated
2007	Red Road	Most Promising Newcomer (Andrea Arnold)	Won
2008	Dog Altogether	Best Short Film	Won
2013	Seaview	Best Short Film	Nominated
2015	Under the Skin	Best British Film	Nominated
2015	Under the Skin	Best Original Music (Mica Levi)	Nominated

=== BAFTA Scotland Awards ===
Year	Nominated work	Category	Result
1997	California Sunshine	Best Short Film	Nominated
2003	Young Adam	Best Film	Win
2003	Young Adam	Best Director (David Mackenzie)	Win
2003	Young Adam	Best Actor in a Scottish Film (Ewan McGregor)	Win
2003	Young Adam	Best Actress in a Scottish Film (Tilda Swinton)	Win
2004	Dear Frankie	Best Director (Shona Auerbach)	Nominated
2004	Dear Frankie	Best First Time Performance (Jack McElhone)	Nominated
2006	Red Road	Best Film	Win
2006	Red Road	Best Director (Andrea Arnold)	Win
2006	Red Road	Best Actor in a Scottish Film (Tony Curran)	Win
2006	Red Road	Best Actress in a Scottish Film (Kate Dickie)	Win
2006	Red Road	Best Screenplay (Andrea Arnold)	Win
2007	Hallam Foe	Best Film	Nominated
2007	Hallam Foe	Best Screenplay	Nominated
2007	Hallam Foe	Best Actor (Jamie Bell)	Nominated
2007	Hallam Foe	Best Actress (Sophia Myles)	Win
2011	Donkeys	Best Feature Film	Win
2011	Donkeys	Best Director (Morag McKinnon)	Nominated
2011	Donkeys	Best Writer (Colin McLaren)	Nominated
2011	Donkeys	Best Actor/Actress – Film (James Cosmo)	Win
2011	Donkeys	Best Actor/Actress – Film (Brian Pettifer)	Nominated
2011	Donkeys	Audience Award – Favourite Scottish Film	Nominated
2011	Perfect Sense	Best Feature Film	Nominated
2011	Perfect Sense	Best Director	Nominated
2011	Perfect Sense	Audience Award – Favourite Scottish Film	Nominated
2011	You Instead	Audience Award – Favourite Scottish Film	Nominated
2011	I Love Luci	Best Short Film	Win
2012	Citadel	Best Feature Film	Nominated
2013	Starred Up	Best Feature Film	Win
2013	Starred Up	Best Directing in Film or TV	Win
2013	Starred Up	Best Actor – Film (Jack O'Connell)	Nominated
2015	The Legend of Barney Thomson	Best Feature Film	Win
2015	The Legend of Barney Thomson	Best Directing in Film or Television (Robert Carlyle)	Nominated
2015	The Legend of Barney Thomson	Best Actor – Film (Robert Carlyle)	Nominated
2015	The Legend of Barney Thomson	Best Actress – Film (Emma Thompson)	Win
2015	Swung	Best Actress – Film (Elena Anaya)	Nominated
2015	Swung	Best Actress – Film (Elizabeth McGovern)	Nominated
2015	Dropping Off Michael	Best Short Film	Nominated

=== Berlin International Film Festival ===
Year	Nominated work	Category	Result
2007	Hallam Foe	Prize of the Guild of German Art House Cinemas	Win
2007	Hallam Foe	Silver Berlin Bear – Best Film Music	Win
2007	Hallam Foe	Golden Berlin Bear	Nominated

=== British Independent Film Awards ===
Year	Nominated work	Category	Result
2003	Young Adam	Best British Independent Film	Nominated
2003	Young Adam	Best Director (David Mackenzie)	Nominated
2003	Young Adam	Best Actor (Ewan McGregor)	Nominated
2003	Young Adam	Best Actress (Tilda Swinton)	Nominated
2003	Wilbur Wants to Kill Himself	Most Promising Newcomer (Jamie Sives)	Nominated
2003	Wilbur Wants to Kill Himself	Best Screenplay (Anders Thomas Jensen & Lone Scherfig)	Nominated
2003	Wilbur Wants to Kill Himself	Best Supporting Actor/Actress (Shirley Henderson)	Nominated
2003	Wilbur Wants to Kill Himself	Best Supporting Actor/Actress (Adrian Rawlins)	Nominated
2006	Red Road	Best British Independent Film	Nominated
2006	Red Road	Best Actor (Tony Curran)	Win
2006	Red Road	Best Actress (Kate Dickie)	Win
2006	Red Road	Best Supporting Actor/Actress (Martin Compston)	Nominated
2006	Red Road	Douglas Hickox Award (Andrea Arnold)	Nominated
2007	Hallam Foe	Best British Independent Film	Nominated
2007	Hallam Foe	Best Director (David Mackenzie)	Nominated
2007	Hallam Foe	Best Screenplay (David Mackenzie & Ed Whitmore)	Nominated
2007	Hallam Foe	Best Technical Achievement (David Mackenzie & Colin Monie for Music)	Nominated
2007	Hallam Foe	Best Actor (Jamie Bell)	Nominated
2007	Hallam Foe	Best Actress (Sophia Myles)	Nominated
2007	Dog Altogether	Best British Short	Win
2011	You Instead	Best Achievement in Production	Nominated
2013	Starred Up	Best British Independent Film	Nominated
2013	Starred Up	Best Director (David Mackenzie)	Nominated
2013	Starred Up	Best Screenplay (Jonathan Asser)	Nominated
2013	Starred Up	Best Achievement in Production	Nominated
2013	Starred Up	Best Technical Achievement (Shaheen Baig for Casting)	Nominated
2013	Starred Up	Best Actor (Jack O'Connell)	Nominated
2013	Starred Up	Best Supporting Actor (Ben Mendelsohn)	Win
2013	Starred Up	Best Supporting Actor (Rupert Friend)	Nominated
2013	Under the Skin	Best Director (Jonathan Glazer)	Nominated
2013	Under the Skin	Best Technical Achievement (Johnnie Burn for Sound Design)	Nominated
2013	Under the Skin	Best Technical Achievement (Mica Levi for Music)	Nominated
2013	Under the Skin	Best Actress (Scarlett Johansson)	Nominated

=== Cannes Film Festival ===
Year	Nominated work	Category	Result
2003	Young Adam	Un Certain Regard	Nominated
2003	Dogville	Palme d'Or	Nominated
2005	Manderlay	Palme d'Or	Nominated
2006	Red Road	Jury Prize	Win
2006	Red Road	Palme d'Or	Nominated
