= Gillian Berrie =

Scottish film producer

- Director David Mackenzie & Producer Gillian Berrie (2016)
- Occupation: Film Producer
- Organization: Sigma Films
- Website: www.sigmafilms.com

Gillian Berrie is a Scottish film producer and co-founder of the Glasgow-based production company Sigma Films with director David Mackenzie.

Berrie set up Film City Glasgow, creative cluster for production, picture and sound which spearheads independent production in Scotland. She also set up Jumpcut project which aimed to give young and underprivileged people access to working in the film industry through a pop-up film school that created an intensive, mentor-lead fast track into the industry. This was followed by Sharp Shorts which has produced 9 short films in 2020/21, with another nine to follow.

== Career ==
When starting out, Berrie worked on numerous no budget / low budget productions in many different capacities. Alongside David Mackenzie, she wrote and produced California Sunshine (1997) and Somersault (2000), both multi-award-winning shorts. She then went on to work in production on Ken Loach's Carla's Song (1996) and Peter Mullan's Orphans (1998) and as a casting director on Ken Loach's My Name is Joe (1998) and Lynne Ramsay's Ratcatcher (1999).

Berrie then embarked on developing and producing numerous feature projects, beginning with David Mackenzie's The Last Great Wilderness (2002) which was co-produced by Zentropa and premiered in Toronto in 2002.

Over the next two years Berrie received producer credits on 3 films including Lone Scherfig's Wilbur Wants to Kill Himself (2002), Lars von Trier's Dogville (2003) and David Mackenzie's Young Adam (2003).

In 2004, Berrie co-produced Shona Auerbach's Dear Frankie starring Emily Mortimer and Gerard Butler. It premiered at Tribeca Film Festival and competed in Un Certain Regard at Cannes.

Berrie continued the relationship with Zentropa by co-producing Wilbur Wants to Kill Himself (2002), Brothers (2004), Dear Wendy (2004), Manderlay (2005) and After the Wedding (2006). This collaboration has received numerous plaudits from critics with awards and recognition from all over the world including BAFTA, Cannes Film Festival and the Academy Awards.

Together with Zentropa's Sisse Graum Jorgensen, Berrie developed the Advance Party Project which was designed to give directors their first break at feature film level. It produced Andrea Arnold's Cannes-Jury-Prize-winning debut Red Road (2006) and Morag McKinnon's BAFTA-Scotland-winning Donkeys (2010).

Berrie and Mackenzie's second feature film collaboration was Hallam Foe (2007), starring Jamie Bell and Sophia Myles. It won many awards including a Silver Bear in Berlin 2007, the Golden Hitchcock and Kodak Award at the Dinard Festival of British Cinema 2007, and the 2008 National Board of Review Award for Top Independent Film, as well as numerous other nominations including for Bell and Myles' performances.

Berrie and Zentropa]collaborated again to make David Mackenzie's sixth feature film, sci-fi romance Perfect Sense (2011) with Ewan McGregor and Eva Green. The film premiered at the Sundance Film Festival in 2011 and picked up numerous awards at film festivals around the world including Edinburgh, Bratislava and Philadelphia.

Immediately afterwards Berrie produced the Mackenzie directed comedy musical You Instead (2011) [released as Tonight You're Mine in the US]. It was filmed over four and a half days at the Scottish music festival T in the Park in 2010 where the cast and crew had to adopt a kind of guerrilla filmmaking approach to shoot amidst the chaos of a music festival alongside over 100,000 revellers. It sold to numerous territories throughout the world and premiered at both T in the Park in 2011 and at Austin's SXSW.

Next, Berrie produced Mackenzie's Starred Up (2013), starring Jack O'Connell, Ben Mendelsohn and Rupert Friend. The story is based on writer Jonathan Asser's real-life experiences as a voluntary therapist in a London prison. The film was critically acclaimed and won numerous awards including the BAFTA Scotland 2014 Best Film and Best Director Awards, seven BIFA nominations and holds a 99% Rotten Tomatoes score.

Berrie also co-produced Jonathan Glazer's Under the Skin (2013) starring Scarlett Johansson. It had its World Premiere at Telluride at the same time as Starred Up, then played Venice Film Festival and has since picked up over 20 awards and 90 nominations internationally.

In late 2016, Berrie EP'd on TV pilot Damnation for the USA Network, directed by Mackenzie. Described as an epic saga of the secret history of the 1930s American heartland, it chronicles the mythic conflict and bloody struggle between big money and the downtrodden, God and greed, charlatans and prophets. In May 2017, Damnation was picked up to series by the USA Network and has been released by Netflix outside of the US.

In 2017, Berrie began production on David Mackenzie's tenth feature, Outlaw King. The film stars Chris Pine as Robert the Bruce, with Aaron Taylor-Johnson playing James Douglas, Florence Pugh playing Elizabeth de Burgh and Billy Howle as Edward, the Prince of Wales. Sigma Films produced the historical epic which was released internationally by Netflix on November 9, 2018.

In 2002, Berrie received the BAFTA Scotland Outstanding Contribution Award for her achievements in the Scottish film industry.

In 2014, Berrie received an honorary doctorate from the University of the West of Scotland for her contribution to film, culture and the arts.

2020 saw Berrie's Film City Futures at the centre of a new £1m talent development programme in partnership with Screen Scotland and The British Film Institute (BFI). The programme, Short Circuit, develops and provides opportunities for new and emerging writers, directors and producers from across Scotland. As well as producing up to 30 short films it developed 10 feature-length scripts over two years, from 2020-22.

Berrie wrapped Tetris, a feature film for Apple directed by Jon Baird and starring Taron Edgerton, in March 2021.

In December 2025 Berrie completed David Mackenzie's Relay, a feature starring Riz Ahmend and Lily James which reached number one on Amazon Prime. Her latest feature with Mackenzie, Fuze starring Aaron Taylor Johnson, Theo James and Sam Worthington was released internationally in April 2026. In September 2026 it was HBO's number 1 streaming hit.

== Filmography ==
Film	Year	Director	Role
Carla's Song	1996	Ken Loach	Production Assistant
California Sunshine	1997	David Mackenzie	Producer, Writer
My Name is Joe	1998	Ken Loach	Casting Director
Orphans	1998	Peter Mullan	Production Coordinator
Ratcatcher	1999	Lynne Ramsay	Casting Director
Somersault	2000	David Mackenzie	Producer, Writer
The Last Great Wilderness	2002	David Mackenzie	Producer, Writer
Wilbur Wants to Kill Himself	2002	Lone Scherfig	Co-Producer
Song for a Raggy Boy	2003	Aisling Walsh	Co-Producer
The Inheritance	2003	Per Fly	Co-Producer
Young Adam	2003	David Mackenzie	Associate Producer
Dogville	2003	Lars von Trier	Co-Producer
Brothers	2004	Susanne Bier	Co-Producer
Dear Frankie	2004	Shona Auerbach	Co-Producer
Dear Wendy	2004	Thomas Vinterburg	Co-Producer
Drabnet	2005	Per Fly	Co-Producer
Zozo	2005	Josef Fares	Co-Producer
Manderlay	2005	Lars von Trier	Co-Producer
The Judge	2005	Gert Fredholm	Co-Producer
1:1	2006	Annette K. Olesen	Co-Producer
We Shall Overcome	2006	Niels Arden Oplev	Co-Producer
When Children Play in the Sky	2006	Lorenzo Hendel	Producer
Red Road	2006	Andrea Arnold	Executive Producer
After the Wedding	2006	Susanne Bier	Co-Producer
Dog Altogether	2007	Paddy Considine	Executive Producer
Hallam Foe	2007	David Mackenzie	Producer
I Love Luci	2010	Colin Kennedy	Executive Producer
Donkeys	2010	Morag MacKinnon	Producer
Perfect Sense	2011	David Mackenzie	Producer
You Instead	2011	David Mackenzie	Producer
A Royal Affair	2012	Nikolaj Arcel	Co-Producer
Citadel	2012	Ciaran Foy	Executive Producer
Seaview	2013	Jane Linfoot	Executive Producer
Under the Skin	2013	Jonathan Glazer	Co-Producer
Starred Up	2013	David Mackenzie	Producer
Good Souls	2014	Elizabeth Randon	Executive Producer
Dropping Off Michael	2015	Zam Salim	Executive Producer
Swung	2015	Colin Kennedy	Executive Producer
Misgivings	2016	Adrian Meade	Executive Producer
Ending	2017	James Lees	Executive Producer
Hush	2017	Olaf de Fleur Johannesson	Executive Producer
Damnation	2017	David Mackenzie	Executive Producer
Outlaw King	2018	David Mackenzie	Producer
Tetris (film)	2020	Jon S. Baird	Executive Producer

== Awards ==
=== Academy Awards ===
Year	Nominated work	Category	Result
2007	After the Wedding	Best Foreign Language Film of the Year	Nominated
2013	A Royal Affair	Best Foreign Language Film of the Year	Nominated

=== BAFTA Awards ===
Year	Nominated work	Category	Result
2005	Dear Frankie	Most Promising Newcomer (Shona Auerbach)	Nominated
2007	Red Road	Most Promising Newcomer (Andrea Arnold)	Won
2008	Dog Altogether	Best Short Film	Won
2013	Seaview	Best Short Film	Nominated
2015	Under the Skin	Best British Film	Nominated
2015	Under the Skin	Best Original Music (Mica Levi)	Nominated

=== BAFTA Scotland Awards ===
Year	Nominated work	Category	Result
1997	California Sunshine	Best Short Film	Nominated
2002		Outstanding Achievement Award	Win
2003	Young Adam	Best Film	Win
2003	Young Adam	Best Director (David Mackenzie)	Win
2003	Young Adam	Best Actor in a Scottish Film (Ewan McGregor)	Win
2003	Young Adam	Best Actress in a Scottish Film (Tilda Swinton)	Win
2004	Dear Frankie	Best Director (Shona Auerbach)	Nominated
2004	Dear Frankie	Best First Time Performance (Jack McElhone)	Nominated
2006	Red Road	Best Film	Win
2006	Red Road	Best Director (Andrea Arnold)	Win
2006	Red Road	Best Actor in a Scottish Film (Tony Curran)	Win
2006	Red Road	Best Actress in a Scottish Film (Kate Dickie)	Win
2006	Red Road	Best Screenplay (Andrea Arnold)	Win
2007	Hallam Foe	Best Film	Nominated
2007	Hallam Foe	Best Screenplay	Nominated
2007	Hallam Foe	Best Actor (Jamie Bell)	Nominated
2007	Hallam Foe	Best Actress (Sophia Myles)	Win
2011	Donkeys	Best Feature Film	Win
2011	Donkeys	Best Director (Morag McKinnon)	Nominated
2011	Donkeys	Best Writer (Colin McLaren)	Nominated
2011	Donkeys	Best Actor/Actress - Film (James Cosmo)	Win
2011	Donkeys	Best Actor/Actress - Film (Brian Pettifer)	Nominated
2011	Donkeys	Audience Award - Favourite Scottish Film	Nominated
2011	Perfect Sense	Best Feature Film	Nominated
2011	Perfect Sense	Best Director	Nominated
2011	Perfect Sense	Audience Award - Favourite Scottish Film	Nominated
2011	You Instead	Audience Award - Favourite Scottish Film	Nominated
2011	I Love Luci	Best Short Film	Win
2012	Citadel	Best Feature Film	Nominated
2013	Starred Up	Best Feature Film	Win
2013	Starred Up	Best Directing in Film or TV	Win
2013	Starred Up	Best Actor - Film (Jack O'Connell)	Nominated
2015	Swung	Best Actress - Film (Elena Anaya)	Nominated
2015	Swung	Best Actress - Film (Elizabeth McGovern)	Nominated
2015	Dropping Off Michael	Best Short Film	Nominated

=== Berlin International Film Festival ===
Year	Nominated work	Category	Result
2007	Hallam Foe	Prize of the Guild of German Art House Cinemas	Win
2007	Hallam Foe	Silver Berlin Bear - Best Film Music	Win
2007	Hallam Foe	Golden Berlin Bear	Nominated
2012	A Royal Affair	Silver Berlin Bear - Best Actor (Mikel Boe Folsgaard)	Win
2012	A Royal Affair	Silver Berlin Bear - Best Screenplay (Nikolaj Arcel & Rasmus Heisterberg)	Win
2012	A Royal Affair	Golden Berlin Bear	Nominated

=== British Independent Film Awards ===
Year	Nominated work	Category	Result
2003	Young Adam	Best British Independent Film	Nominated
2003	Young Adam	Best Director (David Mackenzie)	Nominated
2003	Young Adam	Best Actor (Ewan McGregor)	Nominated
2003	Young Adam	Best Actress (Tilda Swinton)	Nominated
2003	Wilbur Wants to Kill Himself	Most Promising Newcomer (Jamie Sives)	Nominated
2003	Wilbur Wants to Kill Himself	Best Screenplay (Anders Thomas Jensen & Lone Scherfig)	Nominated
2003	Wilbur Wants to Kill Himself	Best Supporting Actor/Actress (Shirley Henderson)	Nominated
2003	Wilbur Wants to Kill Himself	Best Supporting Actor/Actress (Adrian Rawlins)	Nominated
2006	Red Road	Best British Independent Film	Nominated
2006	Red Road	Best Actor (Tony Curran)	Win
2006	Red Road	Best Actress (Kate Dickie)	Win
2006	Red Road	Best Supporting Actor/Actress (Martin Compston)	Nominated
2006	Red Road	Douglas Hickox Award (Andrea Arnold)	Nominated
2007	Hallam Foe	Best British Independent Film	Nominated
2007	Hallam Foe	Best Director (David Mackenzie)	Nominated
2007	Hallam Foe	Best Screenplay (David Mackenzie & Ed Whitmore)	Nominated
2007	Hallam Foe	Best Technical Achievement (David Mackenzie & Colin Monie for Music)	Nominated
2007	Hallam Foe	Best Actor (Jamie Bell)	Nominated
2007	Hallam Foe	Best Actress (Sophia Myles)	Nominated
2007	Dog Altogether	Best British Short	Win
2011	You Instead	Best Achievement in Production	Nominated
2013	Starred Up	Best British Independent Film	Nominated
2013	Starred Up	Best Director (David Mackenzie)	Nominated
2013	Starred Up	Best Screenplay (Jonathan Asser)	Nominated
2013	Starred Up	Best Achievement in Production	Nominated
2013	Starred Up	Best Technical Achievement (Shaheen Baig for Casting)	Nominated
2013	Starred Up	Best Actor (Jack O'Connell)	Nominated
2013	Starred Up	Best Supporting Actor (Ben Mendelsohn)	Win
2013	Starred Up	Best Supporting Actor (Rupert Friend)	Nominated
2013	Under the Skin	Best Director (Jonathan Glazer)	Nominated
2013	Under the Skin	Best Technical Achievement (Johnnie Burn for Sound Design)	Nominated
2013	Under the Skin	Best Technical Achievement (Mica Levi for Music)	Nominated
2013	Under the Skin	Best Actress (Scarlett Johansson)	Nominated

=== Cannes Film Festival ===
Year	Nominated work	Category	Result
2003	Young Adam	Un Certain Regard	Nominated
2003	Dogville	Palme d'Or	Nominated
2005	Manderlay	Palme d'Or	Nominated
2006	Red Road	Jury Prize	Win
2006	Red Road	Palme d'Or	Nominated
