= Adrian J. McDowall =

Scottish filmmaker

Adrian John McDowall (born 20 January 1978) is a BAFTA award-winning Scottish filmmaker.

== Biography ==
Adrian John McDowall was born on 20 January 1978 in Dumfries, Scotland. His early years were spent growing up in Wigtown, a small town of around 1000 people in the Machars area of Wigtownshire. He attended the town's primary school and afterwards the Douglas Ewart High School in nearby Newton Stewart. Adrian has an older brother.

He studied at Edinburgh College of Art from 1995 to 2001. He graduated with a MDES in Visual Communication specializing in Film and Television. As part of his honours degree, he wrote and directed his first film Who's My Favourite Girl?, which went on to win over 30 national and international accolades including the British BAFTA for Best Short Film. It was presented to him and his producers Joern Utkilen and Kara Johnston by actor Leslie Nielsen.

In 2001 he formed the screenwriting company Imagine Pictures Limited with filmmaker Joern Utkilen.

Adrian has continued to write and direct numerous award-winning short films including The Toon Fair, Headbangers, Wise Guys (written by Simon Stephenson), Myself Only More So (written by Nicole Taylor of Secret Diary of a Call Girl), and One Track Mind. Slice, Ma Bar and Standing Start were co-directed and co-produced with Finlay Pretsell.

Standing Start premièred at the Edinburgh Film Festival and has since screened at numerous other international film festivals. It was also shortlisted for the Bloomberg Newcomer Award at the 2008 Grierson Documentary Awards.

Ma Bar premièred at the Edinburgh Film Festival and went on to screen in competition at the 2009 Sundance Film Festival. It was Awarded the BAFTA Scotland Award for Best Short film in 2008.

In 2004 Adrian directed the music video "Summer Jets" for Ivor Novello award-winning, singer/ songwriter Iain Archer (ex-Snow Patrol and Reindeer Section guitarist). This was nominated for XFM Music Video of the year 2004, alongside the artists Eminem, Franz Ferdinand, The Streets and The Killers.

In 2008, Adrian directed 2 episodes (#96 and #102) of the long running Scottish crime drama Taggart for the ITV network.

In 2009, Adrian was included in a pool of eight writer directors as part of the filmmakers collective Advance Party II - the successor to Sigma Films and Zentropa's Advance Party which produced Andrea Arnorld's Cannes Jury Prize winning feature film Red Road, and Morag McKinnon's Rounding Up Donkeys. The aim of the collective is to produce eight features films from first-time feature film directors.
