= Relay (film) =

2024 American film by David Mackenzie

- Theatrical release poster
- Directed by: David Mackenzie
- Written by: Justin Piasecki
- Produced by: Gillian Berrie; Basil Iwanyk; David Mackenzie; Teddy Schwarzman
- Starring: Riz Ahmed; Lily James; Sam Worthington
- Cinematography: Giles Nuttgens
- Edited by: Matt Mayer
- Music by: Tony Doogan
- Production companies: Black Bear Pictures; Thunder Road Films; Sigma Films
- Distributed by: Bleecker Street
- Release dates: September 8, 2024 (TIFF); August 22, 2025 (United States)
- Running time: 112 minutes
- Country: United States
- Language: English
- Box office: $4.7 million

Relay is a 2024 American thriller film directed by David Mackenzie and written by Justin Piasecki. Starring Riz Ahmed, Lily James, and Sam Worthington, the film follows a fixer who assists whistleblowers while concealing his identity through a relay service for the deaf. The film had its world premiere at the Toronto International Film Festival on September 8, 2024, and was released theatrically on August 22, 2025. It received positive reviews and has grossed $4.7 million.

== Plot ==
In New York City, Ash is a fixer mediating between would-be whistleblowers and companies they expose. Hoffman, a former employee of Optimo, possesses documents incriminating the company. Having been intimidated by henchmen sent by Optimo CEO McVie, he changed his mind about going public. Ash represents Hoffman and brokers a payoff with McVie. After sending the anonymous Ash a copy to guarantee his safety, Hoffman surrenders the documents to McVie. Ash secretly follows Hoffman until he safely boards a train out of the city. Ash adds his copy to his collection at a warehouse in Newark.

Sarah Grant meets an attorney seeking help to return a document that she has taken from a company, Cybo Sementis Research, which employs her as a research scientist. She states that the document proves Cybo Sementis has covered up the dangerous side effects of their genetically modified wheat, and that she had planned to go public with the report but is now desperate to return it in response to the company's campaign of intimidation. The lawyer directs her to Ash who uses a telecommunications device for the deaf and a relay service to maintain his anonymity while communicating with her. Ash agrees to facilitate the return of the report while retaining a copy as a guarantee, and provides Sarah with burner phones, detailed instructions, and a passcode to use over the phone.

Ash observes a surveillance team tracking her. The team is led by Dawson and includes operatives Rosetti, Ryan, and Lee. They trace Ash's call to the Tri-State Relay Service, but are legally blocked as no call records or logs are kept. On Ash's instructions, Sarah flies to Pittsburgh, followed by the team and a disguised Ash, who tracks them as well as Sarah, as she mails two packages, one which misdirects the team to Oklahoma, while the other, containing the report and a cash deposit, is forwarded to Ash.

Armed with the report, Ash threatens to inform law enforcement and the media, jeopardizing the company's upcoming billion-dollar merger. Dawson agrees to leave Sarah alone and mails Ash a $500,000 payoff, but hides a tracking device inside. A recovering alcoholic, Ash poses as a bicycle messenger named Tom to attend AA meetings with his sponsor Wash, a police detective. Ash enlists a deaf forger—with whom he signs—to build Sarah a new identity, while check-in voicemails from Hoffman reveal his guilt at having endangered lives by letting Optimo escape consequences.

When Sarah fails to make her own nightly check-in, Ash calls her in the guise of the relay service, admitting that dealings with clients have gone wrong before. He forwards the payoff across the country, ensuring the tracker's battery dies. Days before the merger, Ash is forced to arrange a dead drop for documents Sarah neglected to send, narrowly evading Dawson's team. After a final call from Hoffman, Ash reveals in AA that he turned to drinking in the wake of 9/11 and after uncovering corporate wrongdoing himself, and struggles with the guilt of being paid for his silence.

Sarah fails to appear for the document handoff, and Ash concludes the team have duped her into believing they identified him as "James Keaton" through facial recognition. Claiming to protect him, she arranges the handoff herself at a symphony performance. Racing to the concert hall, Ash pulls the fire alarm to rescue her from Dawson and his team. Ash tells her his name and sees her onto a train, but Dawson soon calls with a captive Sarah, demanding the documents. After nearly succumbing to a drink at a bar and calling Wash, Ash surrenders and is placed in the surveillance van with Sarah.

Dawson holds Sarah at gunpoint, forcing Ash to direct them to the warehouse. Ash throws Lee from the moving vehicle and fights off Dawson, but Sarah helps subdue Ash, revealing herself as a member of the team sent by Optimo to recover Hoffman's documents from Ash, the real target of the operation. At the warehouse, Ash distracts the team with a failsafe before fleeing with a gun. Struck by a car, he escapes the others but is confronted by Sarah. Wash arrives with the police, and Ash, Sarah, Dawson, and Ryan are arrested, while Rosetti escapes. Ash offers to turn over the documents to Wash, the only person he trusts. Sometime later, Ash mails most of the $500,000 to the Tri-State Relay Service before boarding a train as news breaks of Optimo's crimes.

== Cast ==
- Riz Ahmed as Ash
- Lily James as Sarah Grant
- Sam Worthington as Dawson
- Willa Fitzgerald as Rosetti
- Jared Abrahamson as Ryan
- Pun Bandhu as Lee
- Eisa Davis as Wash
- Matthew Maher as Hoffman
- Seth Barrish as Morel
- Victor Garber as McVie

== Production ==
=== Development ===
Justin Piasecki's screenplay, originally titled The Broker, was featured on the 2019 Black List of most-liked unproduced screenplays. It is directed by David Mackenzie. The film is produced by Mackenzie, Thunder Road's Basil Iwanyk, Sigma Films' Gillian Berrie and Black Bear Pictures' Teddy Schwarzman.

=== Casting ===
In February 2023, Riz Ahmed and Lily James were cast in the film. In April 2023, Sam Worthington was confirmed as a member of the cast, and was photographed on set in New York.

=== Filming ===
Principal photography began in New York City in April 2023. Filming locations were also set to include Jersey City, New Jersey.

== Music ==
The musical score was composed by Tony Doogan, who also worked with Mackenzie on the Netflix film Outlaw King. The film also features music by John Cale, Kenneth James Gibson, The Heliocentrics, Bush Tetras, Alison Cotton, and others.

== Release ==
Relay had its world premiere at the Toronto International Film Festival on September 8, 2024. In November 2024, Bleecker Street acquired U.S. distribution rights to the film. It was released on August 22, 2025. It was previously set to be released in the second quarter of 2025.

== Reception ==
On the review aggregator website Rotten Tomatoes, 82% of 146 critics' reviews are positive, with an average rating of 6.9/10. The website's consensus reads: "A brainy thriller that harkens back to the gritty verisimilitude of classic conspiracy cinema, Relay might have one reversal too many but finishes the race with aplomb." Metacritic, which uses a weighted average, assigned the film a score of 70 out of 100, based on 28 critics, indicating "generally favorable" reviews.

Damon Wise, writing for Deadline, described the film's cat-and-mouse chase as "ingenious and thrilling", called the twist unexpected but implausible, and criticized the film's exploration of Ash's backstory. Matt Zoller Seitz, writing for RogerEbert.com, praised the film's technical aspects, clear dialogue writing and performances, while criticizing the deus ex machina ending. Robert Abele, writing for the Los Angeles Times, called some of the film's music choices "off-putting", but praised the directing and editing, while saying that "Giles Nuttgens' cinematography achieves a sleek, moody metallic chill". In December 2025, the screenplay by Justin Piasecki was included in the best of the year by Peter Bradshaw in The Guardian.
