= Fuze (film) =

- Theatrical release poster
- Directed by: David Mackenzie
- Written by: Ben Hopkins
- Produced by: Sebastien Raybaud; Callum Christopher Grant; David Mackenzie; Gillian Berrie
- Starring: Aaron Taylor-Johnson; Theo James; Gugu Mbatha-Raw; Sam Worthington
- Cinematography: Giles Nuttgens
- Edited by: Matt Mayer
- Music by: Tony Doogan
- Production companies: Anton; Sigma Films
- Distributed by: Sky Cinema (through StudioCanal)
- Release dates: 5 September 2025 (TIFF); 3 April 2026 (United Kingdom)
- Running time: 96 minutes
- Country: United Kingdom
- Language: English
- Budget: $45 million
- Box office: $5.6 million

Fuze is a 2025 British heist thriller film directed by David Mackenzie and written by Ben Hopkins. The film stars Aaron Taylor-Johnson, Theo James, Gugu Mbatha-Raw, and Sam Worthington. Produced by Sigma Films and Anton, it was released theatrically by Sky Cinema through StudioCanal on 3 April 2026.

== Plot ==
An unexploded bomb, thought to be from the Second World War, is discovered on a busy construction site in Paddington. As the military and police, under the command of Chief Superintendent Zuzana Greenfield, cordon off the area and evacuate members of the public, including the immigrant Rahim and his parents, to Hyde Park, Major Will Tranter and his team are sent in to try to defuse the bomb. The operation is complicated when Tranter discovers a timed trigger. He uses a magnetic clock stopper to temporarily disable the timer, while the rest attempt to build a wall to contain and soften the blast.

Amidst the chaos, Giorgos Karalis and his three accomplices, codenamed X, Y and Z break into the Bank Al Muraqabah in Edgware Road by drilling underneath from the next building and steal money and jewellery. Their heat signature is spotted from Rahim's apartment by a police drone, suspending the bomb disposal operation while policemen search the cordoned area. Karalis is spotted, and the police engage in a chase with the robbers. The clock stopper malfunctions, reactivating the timer and eventually resulting in the bomb detonating before the wall can be completed, but no lives are lost.

The robbers manage to evade the police and escape in a van driven by a fifth accomplice to a safe-house in the countryside. There, Karalis reveals uncut diamonds among the loot, then double-crosses them by calling in a team of armed gangsters he works for led by Ludo, who shoot Y and tie up the robbers, leaving them locked in a shed. When Karalis discovers the diamonds are fake, Ludo's gangsters break his hand, lock him in the boot of their car and drive off with him, but he is able to use his phone to broadcast his location. Y dies from blood loss. X, Z and Driver escape the shed and, already tracking him, catch up, kill Ludo's team, and attempt to suffocate Karalis, but Tranter arrives, shoots X dead and injures Z and Driver, allowing Karalis to escape.

The police finds out the bomb is actually from the British Army, but by the time they are able to figure out Tranter, Karalis and Rahim's involvement in the heist, the three have fled the UK on separate flights. Reuniting in Istanbul, it is revealed that Tranter was working with Karalis to steal the diamonds; when Karalis was discovered, Tranter sabotaged the clock stopper, triggering the explosion to buy them time to escape the police. After arranging for the diamonds to be cut and sold, and dividing the money equally between them, the three part ways.

A flashback reveals that Tranter, Karalis and Rahim first met ten years earlier in Afghanistan, when Karalis was double-crossed by his employer, who kidnapped him, only for their convoy to be caught up in an IED blast; with Tranter and Rahim providing cover fire, Karalis was able to disarm most of the remaining land mines.

== Cast ==
- Aaron Taylor-Johnson as Major Will Tranter
- Theo James as Giorgos "George" Karalis, a bank robber
- Gugu Mbatha-Raw as Chief Superintendent Zuzana Greenfield
- Sam Worthington as "X", a member of Karalis' heist team
- Saffron Hocking as Military Sergeant Dootsie Keane
- Elham Ehsas as Rahim, a civilian affected by the heist
- Shaun Mason as "Y", a member of Karalis' heist team
- Nabil Elouahabi as "Z", a member of Karalis' heist team
- Alexander Arnold as Corporal Martin
- Honor Swinton Byrne as Clareese, Zuzana's right-hand
- Luke Mably as Lieutenant Colonel Headley
- Iain Fletcher as General Milton
- Samuel Oatley as Police Chief Newman
- Dragos Bucur as Ludo
- Kerry Pallot as the Gang Driver, a member of Karalis' heist team

== Production ==
Fuze was written by Ben Hopkins, and the project was taken to the 2024 European Film Market with plans for David Mackenzie to direct and Aaron Taylor-Johnson to star. Giles Nuttgens was also attached as director of photography. Theo James was then added to the cast. In July 2024, Sam Worthington, Gugu Mbatha-Raw, Saffron Hocking, Elham Ehsas and Honor Swinton Byrne joined the cast.

To ensure the plausibility of the plot, which revolves around an unexploded World War II bomb serving as a cover for a major heist, Mackenzie and the production team consulted extensively with real-world bomb disposal experts, military personnel, and police during the development phase. The project officially gained momentum shortly after the conclusion of the 2023 Writers Guild of America strike.

Principal photography began on 9 July 2024, in London.

=== Casting ===
The film marks the second collaboration between Mackenzie and actor Aaron Taylor-Johnson, who previously worked together on Outlaw King (2018). Mackenzie approached Taylor-Johnson directly with the offer to play the character Will Tranter. According to Taylor-Johnson, co-star Theo James significantly expanded his own character from the initial script, bringing additional depth and spontaneity through improvisation.

== Influences ==
Mackenzie conceived the film as an independent British production with commercial elements. In blending the heist genre with high-stakes tension, the director was heavily inspired by Kathryn Bigelow's The Hurt Locker. Additionally, the filmmakers drew influence from 1970s French heist movies, specifically those starring Alain Delon, aiming to capture a similar dynamic of mysterious, morally ambiguous characters. While the character dynamics also echo elements of Michael Mann's Heat, the primary focus was on maintaining a grounded, fast-paced atmosphere.

== Release ==
Fuze premiered at the Toronto International Film Festival on 5 September 2025 at the Gala Presentations section. Sky Cinema announced that it would distribute the film theatrically in the United Kingdom and Ireland. It was released theatrically on 3 April 2026. The film's US distribution rights were acquired by Roadside Attractions and Saban Films, and gave the film a wide release on 24 April 2026.

== Reception ==
=== Box office ===
As of June 4, 2026, Fuze has grossed $1,486,030 in the United States and Canada, and $3,205,855 in other territories, for a worldwide total of $4,691,885.

=== Critical response ===
On the review aggregator website Rotten Tomatoes, 72% of 112 critics' reviews are positive, with an average rating of 6.3/10. The website's consensus reads: "Unapologetically leaning into its own pulpy excess, Fuze detonates as a stylish thriller with energy, craft, and twists to spare." Metacritic, which uses a weighted average, assigned the film a score of 60 out of 100, based on 24 critics, indicating "mixed or average" reviews.
