= Giles Nuttgens =

British cinematographer

- Born: 12 June 1960 (age 66); United Kingdom
- Years active: 1981–present
- Parent(s): Patrick Nuttgens; Bridget Badenoch
- Relatives: Sandy Nuttgens

Giles Nuttgens (born 1960) is a British cinematographer, known for his collaborations with directors George Lucas, Deepa Mehta, David Mackenzie, Michael Winterbottom, and Scott McGehee and David Siegel.

For his work in Hell or High Water, he received a nomination for the BAFTA Award for Best Cinematography.

== Career ==
Nuttgens began his career with the BBC TV for the Natural History documentary unit in 1984, and rose up through the camera assistant ranks, and by the age of 25 he was one of the youngest film cameramen ever in the BBC.

== Filmography ==
=== Film ===
Year	Title	Director
1992	Electric Moon	Pradip Krishen
1996	Fire	Deepa Mehta
1997	Keep the Aspidistra Flying	Robert Bierman
1998	Earth	Deepa Mehta
2000	Battlefield Earth	Roger Christian
2001	The Deep End	Scott McGehee; David Siegel
2002	Swimfan	John Polson
2003	Young Adam	David Mackenzie
2004	If Only	Gil Junger
2005	Asylum	David Mackenzie
2005	Bee Season	Scott McGehee; David Siegel
2005	Water	Deepa Mehta
2007	The Good Night	Jake Paltrow
2007	Hallam Foe	David Mackenzie
2008	Heaven on Earth	Deepa Mehta
2009	The Loss of a Teardrop Diamond	Jodie Markell
2010	Saint John of Las Vegas	Hue Rhodes
2011	Perfect Sense	David Mackenzie
2011	You Instead	David Mackenzie
2012	Midnight's Children	Deepa Mehta
2012	What Maisie Knew	Scott McGehee; David Siegel
2013	Dom Hemingway	Richard Shepard
2014	God Help the Girl	Stuart Murdoch
2014	Young Ones	Jake Paltrow
2015	The D Train	Jarrad Paul; Andrew Mogel
2016	The Fundamentals of Caring	Rob Burnett
2016	Hell or High Water	David Mackenzie
2017	Grain	Semih Kaplanoğlu
2018	The Wedding Guest	Michael Winterbottom
2018	Colette	Wash Westmoreland
2019	Greed	Michael Winterbottom
2020	Think Like a Dog	Gil Junger
2020	Enola Holmes	Harry Bradbeer
2021	Montana Story	Scott McGehee; David Siegel
2022	Enola Holmes 2	Harry Bradbeer
2023	Shoshana	Michael Winterbottom
2024	The Friend	Scott McGehee; David Siegel
2024	Relay	David Mackenzie
2025	Fuze	David Mackenzie
2026	Just Play Dead	Martin Campbell

=== Television ===
Year	Title	Director	Notes
1993	The Young Indiana Jones Chronicles	Deepa Mehta	Episode "Benares, January 1910"
1994	Anna Lee	Peter Barber-Fleming	Episodes "Stalker" and "Requiem"
1995	Claudia Schiffer - Close Up	Michael Schultz	
1996	Bodyguards	Robert Bierman; Christopher King	3 episodes
1997	Born to Run	Jean Stewart	
2017	Damnation	Adam Kane	Episode "Sam Riley's Body"

TV movies

Year	Title	Director	Notes
1995	Attack of the Hawkmen	Ben Burtt	Part of The Young Indiana Jones Chronicles
1996	Travels with Father	Deepa Mehta; Michael Schultz	Part of The Young Indiana Jones Chronicles
1999	Alice in Wonderland	Nick Willing	
2016	A Lot	Richard Shepard	

== Awards and nominations ==
Year	Award	Category	Title	Result
2001	Sundance Film Festival	Best Cinematography	The Deep End	Won
2005	Genie Awards	Best Cinematography	Water	Won
2016	BAFTA Awards	Best Cinematography	Hell or High Water	Nominated
