= Donkeys (film) =

- Film poster
- Directed by: Morag McKinnon
- Written by: Lone Scherfig
- Release dates: 20 June 2010 (Edinburgh); 8 October 2010 (United Kingdom)
- Country: United Kingdom
- Language: English

Donkeys is a 2010 Scottish independent feature film, directed by Morag McKinnon and starring James Cosmo, Kate Dickie, Martin Compston, Brian Pettifer, and Natalie Press. It was awarded best feature film at the 2011 British Academy Scotland Awards, and Cosmo was named best actor.

== Plot ==
The film is a black comedy or tragicomedy set in Glasgow, Scotland. Cosmo plays an old man called Alfred trying to mend his relationship with his children, daughter Jackie (Kate Dickie) and son Stevie (Martin Compston), with darkly comic results.

== Production and release ==
It was originally planned as the second part of the Advance Party trilogy inspired by Lars von Trier and the Dogme 95 movement. It followed Andrea Arnold's Red Road, and all the films in the trilogy, produced by Sigma Films and Zentropa, were supposed to feature the same characters and actors. Kate Dickie's character Jackie was the lead playing a CCTV camera-operator in Red Road and is a checkout operator in Donkeys.

However the production was difficult, due partly to the illness of original lead actor Andy Armour, who was eventually replaced by James Cosmo; Armour died of cancer a few months later.

It was premiered at the 2010 Edinburgh International Film Festival and opened in October 2010 at Cineworld Renfrew Street in Glasgow.

== Reception ==
The film's reviews were mixed. The Hollywood Reporter praised its "mordant humour" but found the characters uninteresting. The Scotsman rated it 2/5, complaining that the restrictions of the trilogy brought no benefit to the film, and that it lurched tonally between tragicomedy and tragedy through a series of obvious plot twists. The List gave it a more positive review, scoring it 4/5, and praising it as a black comedy that was tonally quite distinct from Red Road. The Radio Times criticised the direction and screenplay as "slipshod". The Quietus considered that it wasn't as good as Red Road and would confuse audiences expecting a straight sequel, but was "moving, funny and disturbing in parts".
