= Samuel Oatley =

British actor

- Born: Samuel Oatley
- Education: Rose Bruford College (BA)
- Occupation: Actor
- Years active: 1997–present

Samuel Oatley is a British actor best known for his roles in TV roles such as Strike (2017) Doctor Who (2005) Witless (2016) and New Tricks (2003).

== Early life and education ==
He is normally based in South East London, having completed the BA (Hons) Acting programme at Rose Bruford College of Theatre and Performance in 2004.

== Career ==
He is also a Globe Education Practitioner at Shakespeare's Globe, on London's Southbank. Sam is also a poker and boxing fanatic.

He has appeared in several theatre productions including, Any Means Necessary by Kefi Chadwick (at the Nottingham Playhouse in 2016), King Lear (at Theatre Royal, Bath) and Richard III (at Nottingham Playhouse / York Theatre Royal). As well as Incarcerator (at the Old Red Lion) and Merchant of Venice, Twelfth Night, Macbeth, (all at the Globe).

During the summer of 2021, Sam became the first male actor to play Juliet (from Romeo and Juliet) on the Shakespeare's Globe stage since its opening performance in 1997, after being called in for two shows. In 2022, he played Mark Antony in Julius Caesar at Shakespeare's Globe before going on a tour of the UK.

== Filmography ==
=== Television ===
Year	Title	Role	Notes
1997	No Sweat	Roland	1 episode
2004	Foyle's War	Jack Archer	1 episode
2005–2013	Casualty	David Mitton / Shane Wheeler	3 episodes
2005	ShakespeaRe-Told	Journalist	TV Mini Series:1 episode
2006	Bad Girls	Ian Nebeski	1 episode
2006	Pickles: The Dog Who Won the World Cup	Ken Bowles	TV Movie
2006–2008	The Bill	Warren Pritchard / Rick Davis	3 episodes
2007	Little Devil	Martin Crowe	TV Mini Series:3 episodes
2007	Doctors	Ben Lore	1 episode
2008	Midsomer Murders	Brad	1 episode
2009	Holby City	Wes Crayford	1 episode
2009	Law & Order: UK	Darren McKenzie	1 episode
2013	Breathless	Coal Man (uncredited)	TV Mini Series:1 episode
2014	Endeavour	Mallory	1 episode
2015	New Tricks	Young Standing	2 episodes
2015	Partners in Crime	McKeown	TV Mini Series:1 episode
2016	Witless	Ian	4 episodes
2017	Man Down	Ronnie	1 episode
2018	Doctor Who	Tim Shaw / Tzim-Sha	2 episodes
2020–2022	Strike	DI George Layborn	5 episodes
2020	Cursed	Red Paladin 2	1 episode
2020	Small Axe	PC Cooper	TV Mini Series:1 episode
2025	The War Between the Land and the Sea	Tide	TV Mini Series:2 episodes

=== Film ===
Year	Title	Role	Notes
2006	.357	Darren	Short film
2007	Hush Your Mouth	Ricky	Tom Tyrwhitt's first feature film
2007	London Love Story	Colin	Short, (Credited as Sam Oatley)
2007	War Hero	The Soldier	Short
2007	Honeymoon	Lad	Short
2010	Initiation	Kiriil	Short
2012	Magpie Sings the Blues	Michael	Short
2012	Teeth	Dentist	Short
2013	The Boxer	Danny King	Short film, written by Nick Dearman and directed by Max Lowenbein.
2016	Hard Light	Goss	Short
2025	Fuze	PC Newman	Crime thriller heist film directed by David Mackenzie

=== Video games ===
Year	Title	Role	Notes
2018	World of Warcraft: Battle for Azeroth	Unknown	Voice role only
2019	Blood & Truth	Unknown	Voice role only
