= David Mackenzie (director) =

British film director (born 1966)

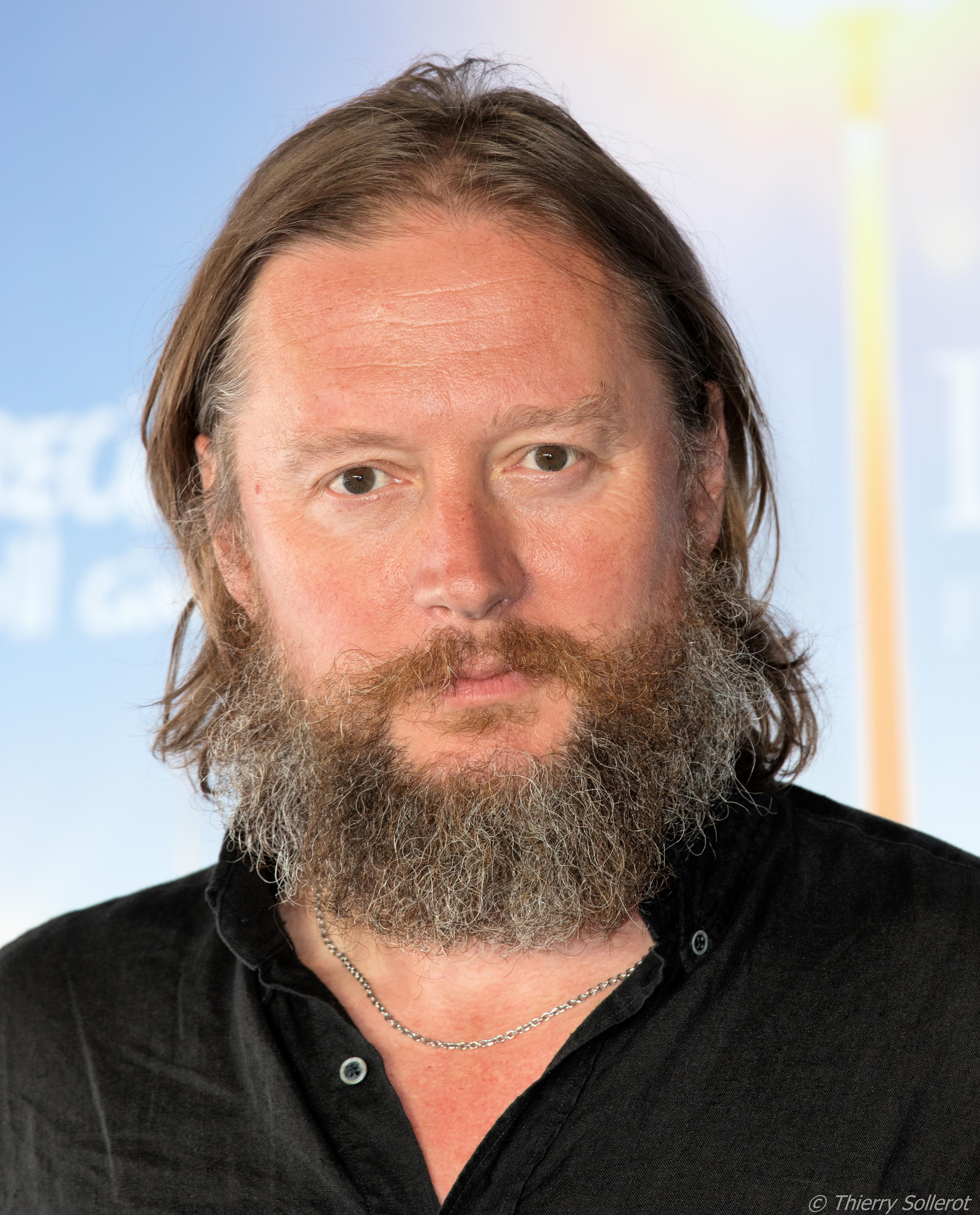
- Mackenzie in 2016
- Born: 10 May 1966 (age 60); Corbridge, Northumberland, England
- Education: DJCAD
- Occupation: Film director
- Organization: Sigma Films
- Relatives: Alastair Mackenzie (brother)

David Hugh Mackenzie (born 10 May 1966) is a Scottish film director and co-founder of the Glasgow-based production company Sigma Films. He has made ten feature films including Young Adam (2003), Hallam Foe (2007), Perfect Sense (2011) and Starred Up (2013). In 2016, Mackenzie's film Hell or High Water premiered at Cannes and was theatrically released in the United States in August. The same year he executive produced Damnation, a TV pilot for Universal Content Productions and USA Network. Mackenzie also directed Outlaw King (2018), a historical film for Netflix. Mackenzie and his films have been described as not fitting neatly into any particular genre or type.

== Career ==
After studying at Duncan of Jordanstone College of Art & Design in Dundee, Mackenzie began his directorial career with a series of well-regarded shorts, the first being Dirty Diamonds (1994). After that came California Sunshine (1997), Somersault (1999) and Marcie's Dowry (2000). All were nominated for and won numerous awards internationally.

Mackenzie's debut feature film is titled The Last Great Wilderness (2002). His brother, actor Alastair Mackenzie, plays a character looking to exact revenge by burning down his wife's lover's house in the Highlands. The film begins as a comedy gangster thriller, then wanders into horror film territory before subverting all expectations and delivering something altogether different instead. It premiered at Toronto International Film Festival (TIFF) in 2002.

He followed this with his acclaimed adaptation of Scots beat writer Alexander Trocchi's cult novel, Young Adam (2003). It features Ewan McGregor as a young drifter working on a river barge as he disrupts his employers' lives while hiding the fact that he knows more about a dead woman found in the river than he admits. Tilda Swinton, Peter Mullan and Emily Mortimer also star. The film premiered in the Un Certain Regard section of Cannes Film Festival 2003, also played in TIFF and Telluride Film Festival, winning Best Film and Best Director at the 2004 BAFTA Scotland awards. McGregor and Swinton both won Scottish BAFTAs for their performances. The film also won the Michael Powell Award for Best British Feature at Edinburgh International Film Festival, and British Newcomer of the Year at the London Film Critics' Circle Awards and was nominated for four British Independent Film Awards (BIFA) nominations and several European Film Academy Awards.

In 2005 Mackenzie directed Asylum, adapted from Patrick McGrath's book and starring Natasha Richardson, Ian McKellen, Hugh Bonneville and Marton Csokas. It follows Richardson's character as she becomes very curious about one of her psychiatrist husband's inmates, a man who was found guilty in the murder and disfigurement of his former wife. It was nominated for Berlin International Film Festival's Golden Bear and won the Prize of the Guild of German Art House Cinemas at the same event.

Next, Mackenzie directed the highly regarded Hallam Foe, starring Jamie Bell and Sophia Myles. The film is adapted from the book by Peter Jinks and follows the voyeuristic title character as he runs away to Edinburgh and becomes transfixed by a beautiful woman who looks uncannily like his late mother. Again, this film won many awards including a Silver Bear in Berlinale 2007, the Golden Hitchcock and Kodak Award for Cinematography at the Dinard Festival 2007, and the 2008 National Board of Review Award for Top Independent Film, as well as numerous other awards.

In 2009 he directed the sex satire Spread, which marked Mackenzie's first feature in the US. The film follows Ashton Kutcher's LA gigolo as he begins living with a rich older client played by Anne Heche. Spread had its premiere at Sundance Film Festival.

Mackenzie followed this by returning to Glasgow to make sci-fi romance Perfect Sense (2011). The film follows a burgeoning romance between McGregor and Eva Green against the backdrop of a global pandemic of people losing their senses one by one. The film premiered at Sundance in 2011 and picked up awards at film festivals around the world including Edinburgh, Bratislava and Philadelphia International Film Festivals.

After Perfect Sense, Mackenzie directed the comedy musical You Instead (2011) (released as Tonight You're Mine in the United States). The film stars Luke Treadaway and Natalia Tena as two rival rock stars who get handcuffed together for 24 hours at a music festival where they're both due to perform. It was filmed over five days at the Scottish music festival T in the Park in 2010. The cast and crew had to adopt a kind of guerrilla filmmaking approach to shoot amidst the chaos of a music festival. It premiered in 2011 at both T in the Park 2011 and Austin based music and film festival South by Southwest (SXSW).

Mackenzie's next film was the prison drama Starred Up (2013). It features Jack O'Connell as a young offender who is moved into an adult prison where his estranged and incarcerated father resides. O'Connell stars alongside Ben Mendelsohn and Rupert Friend. The film is based on the writer Jonathan Asser's experiences as a voluntary therapist in HM Prison Wandsworth. It premiered at Telluride 2013 and went on to win numerous awards, including the BAFTA Scotland 2014 Best Film and Best Director Awards, get nominated for seven BIFAs and holds a remarkable 99% Rotten Tomatoes score.

Mackenzie returned to the United States to direct Hell or High Water (2016), starring Chris Pine, Jeff Bridges and Ben Foster. The film follows two brothers (Pine and Foster) as they go on a bank robbing spree across Texas, whilst being pursued by a Texas Ranger (Bridges) and his partner (Gil Birmingham). The film premiered in the 2016 Cannes Film Festival in the Un Certain Regard section, and was met with critical acclaim internationally. It was the highest grossing independent film of 2016 and its achievements have been recognised with four Academy Awards nominations - including Best Picture - and several Golden Globes and BAFTA nominations.

In late 2016, Mackenzie directed a TV pilot called Damnation for Universal Content Productions and the USA Network. Described as an epic saga of the secret history of the 1930s American heartland, it chronicles the mythic conflict and bloody struggle between big money and the downtrodden, God and greed, charlatans and prophets. Damnation was picked up to series by the USA Network in May 2017 and was released by Netflix outside of the US.

In 2018 Mackenzie's tenth feature film, Outlaw King, starring Pine, Aaron Taylor-Johnson, Florence Pugh and Billy Howle, was released on Netflix. The film depicts the story of Robert the Bruce during the Wars of Scottish Independence. The film is produced by Gillian Berrie and Sigma Films.

On 30 June 2020 Mackenzie's short titled What is Essential? debuted on Netflix as part of their anthology series Homemade, which follows stories from 17 filmmakers from around the world during the COVID-19 pandemic. The short was co-devised with his daughter Ferosa and follows her experience turning 16 under lockdown.

== Personal life ==
Mackenzie lives in Scotland with his partner Hazel Mall and their three children: Ferosa, Luke and Arthur.

His father was Royal Navy Rear Admiral David John Mackenzie (3 October 1929 – 26 November 2015) who served from 1943 to 1984 and fought in Falklands War, and his mother was Ursula Sybil Balfour (31 January 1940 – 11 July 2015). They married in 1965 and both died in 2015. Hell or High Water is dedicated to them.

== Filmography ==
Short film

- Dirty Diamonds (1994)
- California Sunshine (1997)
- Somersault (2000)
- Marcie's Dowry (2000)

=== Feature film ===
Year	Title	Director	Producer	Writer
2002	The Last Great Wilderness	Yes	No	Yes
2003	Young Adam	Yes	No	Yes
2005	Asylum	Yes	No	No
2007	Hallam Foe	Yes	Executive	Yes
2009	Spread	Yes	No	No
2011	Perfect Sense	Yes	Executive	No
2011	You Instead	Yes	No	No
2013	Starred Up	Yes	No	No
2016	Hell or High Water	Yes	No	No
2018	Outlaw King	Yes	Yes	Yes
2024	Relay	Yes	Yes	No
2025	Fuze	Yes	No	No
TBA	Untitled film †	Yes	Yes	No

=== Television ===
Year	Title	Director	Executive producer	Episode(s)
2017	Damnation	No	Yes	"Sam Riley's Body"
2020	Homemade	Yes	No	"Ferosa" (also writer)
2022	Under the Banner of Heaven	Yes	Yes	"When God Was Love"
2022	Under the Banner of Heaven	Yes	Yes	"Rightful Place"

== Awards ==
BAFTA Scotland Awards

Year	Nominated work	Category	Result
2003	Young Adam	Best Director	Win
2007	Hallam Foe	Best Film	Nominated
2007	Hallam Foe	Best Screenplay (with Ed Whitmore)	Nominated
2011	Perfect Sense	Best Director	Nominated
2013	Starred Up	Best Directing in Film or TV	Win

British Independent Film Awards

Year	Nominated work	Category	Result
2003	Young Adam	Best Director	Nominated
2007	Hallam Foe	Best Director	Nominated
2007	Hallam Foe	Best Screenplay (with Ed Whitmore)	Nominated
2013	Starred Up	Best Director	Nominated

== Sigma Films ==
Along with producer Gillian Berrie, David Mackenzie is a partner in Sigma Films. As well as producing Mackenzie's own films, the company has produced other directors' pictures including Andrea Arnold's Red Road (2006), Jonathan Glazer's Under The Skin (2013), Lars von Trier's Dogville (2003) and Robert Carlyle's The Legend of Barney Thomson (2015).

Sigma Films founded the production and post-production facility Film City Glasgow and runs Jumpcut, a new-entrants scheme dedicated to providing a fast-track into the screen industries for young and disadvantaged people.
