= You Instead =

2011 British "Rock 'n' roll romantic comedy" directed by David Mackenzie

- Theatrical release poster
- Directed by: David Mackenzie
- Written by: Thomas Leveritt
- Produced by: Gillian Berrie
- Starring: Luke Treadaway; Natalia Tena; Sophie Wu; Mathew Baynton; Gavin Mitchell; Alastair Mackenzie; Ruta Gedmintas; Kari Corbett
- Cinematography: Giles Nuttgens
- Edited by: Jake Roberts
- Music by: Brian McAlpine
- Production company: Sigma Films
- Distributed by: Icon Film Distribution
- Release dates: February 2011 (Glasgow Film Festival); 16 September 2011 (United Kingdom)
- Running time: 80 minutes
- Country: United Kingdom
- Language: English
- Budget: £1 million
- Box office: $102,492

You Instead (alternate U.S. title Tonight You're Mine) is a 2011 British romantic comedy written by Thomas Leveritt and directed by David Mackenzie. The film stars Luke Treadaway, Natalia Tena, Gavin Mitchell and Alastair Mackenzie. Set at T in the Park music festival and shot by Sigma Films, two feuding rock stars are handcuffed together at a festival where they are due to perform.

== Plot ==
The story centers around two characters Adam and Morello who end up handcuffed whilst appearing at T in the Park. Adam is the lead singer with successful pop group The Make who are booked to perform at popular music festival in Scotland. While looking for his manager he happens upon Morello, the lead singer for the all girl punk band The Dirty Pinks. The two do not get along and end up arguing, while doing so attracting the attention of a preacher who decides to teach them both a lesson in cooperation and compromise. He handcuffs the two together and disposes of the key, leaving the two stuck together until the handcuffs can be removed. This also means that the two must perform together, an arrangement that both are unhappy with. But over time they both see that they have more in common than first thought and Morello begins to wonder whether she is truly happy with her boyfriend Mark.

== Cast ==
- Luke Treadaway as Adam - one half of globally successful indie duo The Make.
- Natalia Tena as Morello - lead singer for all-girl punk band The Dirty Pinks.
- Mathew Baynton as Tyko - keyboard player and backing vocalist for The Make.
- Ruta Gedmintas as Lake - the super-model girlfriend of Adam.
- Gilly Gilchrist as Bruce the Roadie - helps Adam and Morello at various times.
- Alastair Mackenzie as Mark - Morello's banker boyfriend. Mackenzie is the brother of this film's director.
- Gavin Mitchell as Bobby - American manager of The Make. The character was originally called Stan but was changed as the T Festival crowds kept calling him Bobby during filming.
- Joseph Mydell as The Prophet - leads the arguing bands in a prayer, then handcuffs Adam and Morello together.
- Jonny Phillips as Jay.
- Sophie Wu as Kim - an environmental filmmaker trying to raise funds to 'buy' environmental policy from US senators.
- Rebecca Benson as Lucy - Kim's assistant.
- Kari Corbett as Kirsty - The Dirty Pinks' lead guitarist.
- Clare Kelly as Justine - The Dirty Pinks' drummer. At time of filming, she was drummer for the Scottish indie band Suspire.
- Cora Bisset as J.J. - The Dirty Pinks' bass guitarist.

Filmed live at T in the Park 2010, the film features brief appearances from various performers and bands: Paloma Faith, Paolo Nutini, Biffy Clyro, The Proclaimers, Calvin Harris, Newton Faulkner (has a scene with Bobby the manager), Al Green, Jo Mango (has a scene performing for a small gathering, including Adam and Morello), Heather Suttie, Kassidy and The View.

== Production ==
You Instead was filmed in five days at the 2010 T in the Park Festival in Kinross, Scotland. As the movie was filmed on site at T in the Park, the cast and crew were constantly reacting to their surroundings and incorporating them into the performances. The cast and crew camped backstage at the festival instead of the campsite in a specially designed marquee which housed 80 tents. The film was edited daily after shooting was finished, for the day as scenes could not be re-shot after the festival was finished. Director David Mackenzie said one of the factors of him casting the two lead parts was that, "Luke Treadaway and Natalia Tena both have musical experience – Luke’s first movie called Brothers of the Head involved him and his brother playing in some proto-punk band, and Natalia’s got her own band called Molotov Jukebox who are very good". Two of the songs performed in the film were written by Treadaway and Tena.

== Festival setting ==
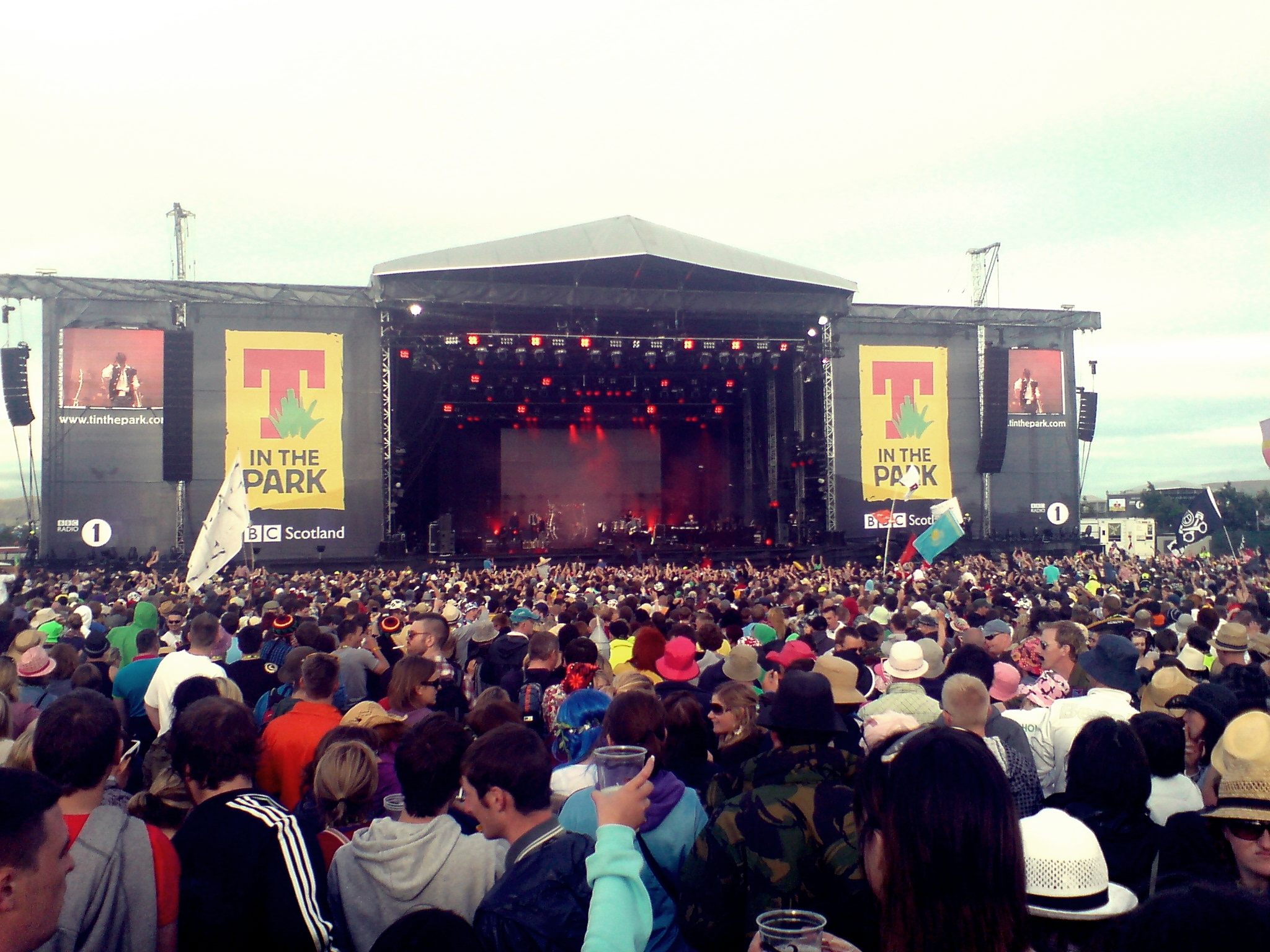
T in the Park Mainstage

T in the Park is a major music festival held in Balado, Kinross-shire, Scotland. The festival's opening year was in 1994 and it has been held annually since. The festival's main sponsor is Tennents Brewery, the reason for the 'T' in the title, and is sponsored by DF Concerts. The festival was originally held in Strathclyde Park, Lanarkshire for the first four years and ran for two days but since then has changed to a three-day weekend with the option of an extra Thursday night camping. The festival has been the host to many famous bands over the years with acts including Foo Fighters, Eminem, Green Day and The Killers. The festival director Geoff Ellis says "The film really captures the spirit of what T in the Park is about!" It allows the viewers of the film to experience the festival through the eyes of bands that travel to T in the Park instead of just attending as a regular guest, thus really allowing the full T in the park experience.

== Release ==
You Instead premiered at the Glasgow Film Festival in March 2011, and went on limited release in September 2011. The film was also shown to Thursday night campers at the festival the following year, 2011. The festival is known to show films to campers to occupy their time on Thursday as there is no live music performed until the Friday of the festival. You Instead Director David Mackenzie said: "After shooting the film entirely at last year's T in the Park, it was only natural that we brought it back to where it was born, one year on."

== Reception ==
You Instead was released to poor to mixed reaction from critics. Peter Bradshaw of The Guardian gave the film one out of five, saying: "A jaw-droppingly self-indulgent, shallow, smug if mercifully brief feature with a plot that looks like the outline for a pop video". Graham Young of the Birmingham Post gave the film zero stars out of five, stating: "I’ve only walked out of one movie in my reviewing life – and that’s Penalty King (2006) which I knew would never get a Midlands release. The mercifully brief You Instead comes a close second. It is pointless, inept and impossible to warm to".

Total Film gave the film three stars out of five, saying: "It’s not quite Before Sunrise with mud and portaloos then, but warm vibes, buzzy crowd scenes and the two leads’ enthusiasm will pull you through to the morning after". Leo Robson of The Financial Times gave the film three stars out of five, saying: "The film shouldn’t work, and for the most part doesn’t; but it left me smiling".

The film was nominated for a Scottish BAFTA for the Best Scottish Film of 2011 but lost out to Fast Romance directed by Carter Ferguson.

On Rotten Tomatoes, the film has a rating of 39% based on reviews from 46 critics.

== Home media ==
The film was released on DVD on 6 February 2012.
