= Perfect Sense =

2011 film by David Mackenzie

- UK theatrical poster
- Directed by: David Mackenzie
- Written by: Kim Fupz Aakeson
- Produced by: Malte Grunert; Gillian Berrie
- Starring: Eva Green; Ewan McGregor; Ewen Bremner; Stephen Dillane; Connie Nielsen
- Cinematography: Giles Nuttgens
- Edited by: Jake Roberts
- Music by: Max Richter
- Production companies: TrustNordisk; BBC Films; Zentropa Entertainment; Scottish Screen; Danish Film Institute; Film i Väst; Irish Film Board; Sigma Films
- Distributed by: Arrow Films (United Kingdom); Eclipse Pictures (Ireland)
- Release dates: 24 January 2011 (Sundance); 7 October 2011 (United Kingdom)
- Running time: 92 minutes
- Countries: United Kingdom; Denmark; Sweden; Ireland
- Language: English

Perfect Sense is a 2011 science fiction romantic drama film directed by David Mackenzie, written by Kim Fupz Aakeson and starring Eva Green and Ewan McGregor. In the film, a chef (McGregor) and a scientist (Green) fall in love as an epidemic begins to rob people of their sensory perceptions.

== Plot ==
An epidemic begins to spread throughout the globe, causing humankind to lose their sensory perceptions one by one. The story focuses on two people: Susan, one of a team of epidemiologists who are trying to find the causes of the disease, and Michael, a chef who works at a busy restaurant located next to Susan's flat. The two meet and get to know each other as the epidemic progresses, a relationship which soon turns to love.

Humans begin to lose their senses one at a time. Each loss is preceded by an outburst of an intense feeling or urge. First, people begin suffering uncontrollable bouts of crying and this is soon followed by the loss of their sense of smell. An outbreak of irrational panic and anxiety, closely followed by a bout of frenzied gluttony, precedes the loss of the sense of taste. The film depicts people trying to adapt to each loss and trying to carry on living as best they can, rediscovering their remaining senses as they do so. Michael and his co-workers do their best to cook food for people who cannot smell nor taste.

The loss of hearing comes next and is accompanied by an outbreak of extreme anger and rage. Michael experiences it first and is verbally abusive at Susan who flees in fear, losing her own hearing shortly afterwards. Despite her knowledge that it was the disease that caused the outburst, Susan cannot face Michael again. People struggle to adjust and to go on living. One day, every person on Earth suddenly experiences a feeling of joyful euphoria. Susan realizes she both forgives and still loves Michael and rushes to his job. The two find each other and embrace just as they, and the rest of the world, become blind.

== Cast ==
- Ewan McGregor as Michael
- Eva Green as Susan
- Connie Nielsen as Jenny, Susan's sister
- Stephen Dillane as Stephen, Susan's boss
- Ewen Bremner as James, Michael's workmate
- Denis Lawson as Michael's boss
- Alastair Mackenzie as Susan's workmate
- Katy Engels as Narrator

== Production ==
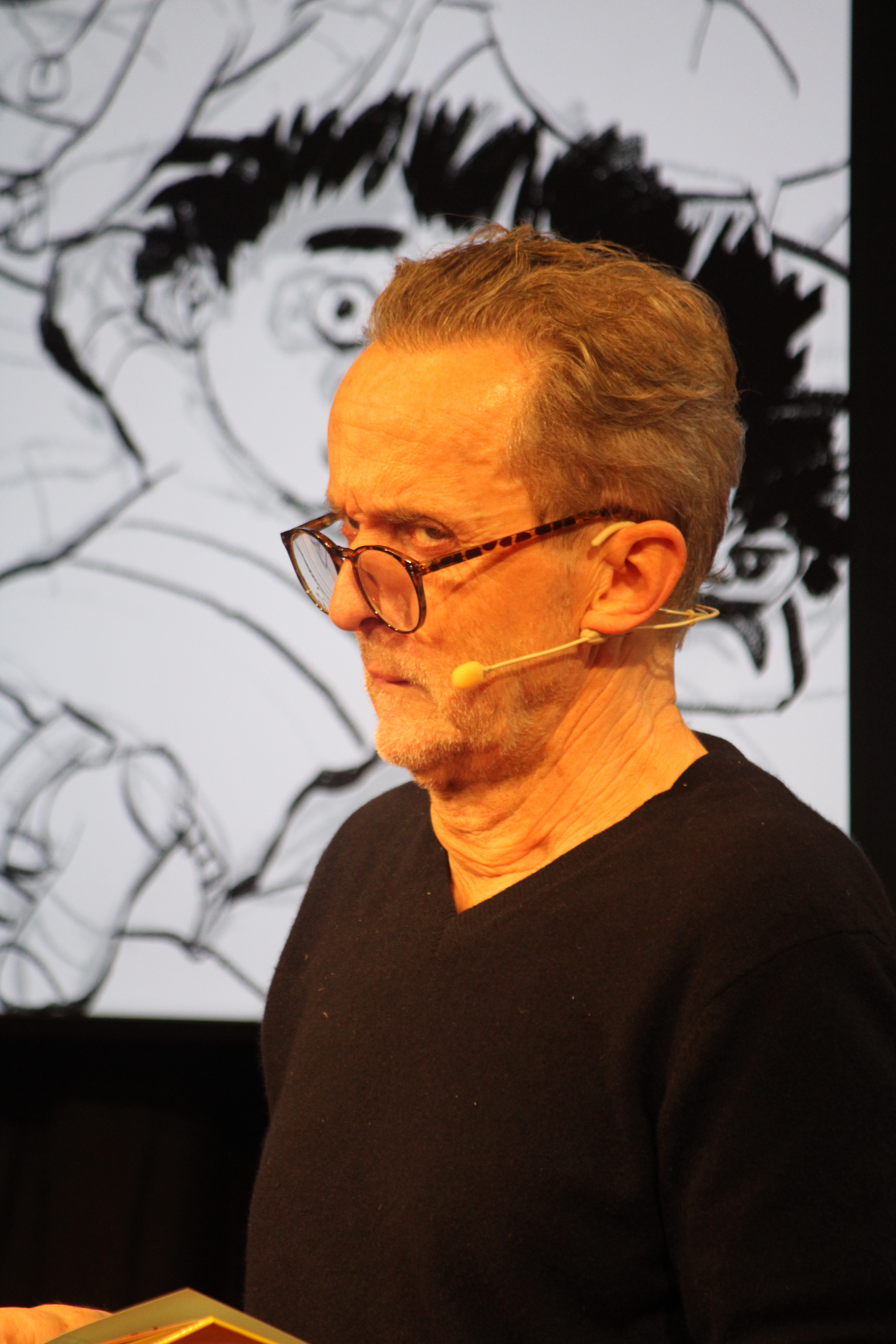
Kim Fupz Aakeson, the film's writer

The film had the working title The Last Word, and Kim Fupz Aakeson's script was originally set in Copenhagen, Denmark, the capital of his homeland, but was transferred to Glasgow, Scotland, after director David Mackenzie's homeland. Scenes were shot in various locations around Glasgow, Mexico City and Kenya. The film premiered at the 2011 Sundance Film Festival.

== Reception ==
Reviews for Perfect Sense have been mixed. Rotten Tomatoes has the film ranked at 57%. Tirdad Derakhshani of the Philadelphia Inquirer wrote in his review, "The film loses its charm with annoying sequences that have a narrator explain to us 'The Meaning of it All' and then tell us 'What Really Matters' in life: Love. Love. Love."; and Stephen Holden of The New York Times defined it as "a solemn sci-fi parable set in present-day Glasgow, whose deepening sense of foreboding is sustained by the enigmatic, pseudo-biblical reflections of an unseen narrator." Mark Holcomb of The Village Voice said the film "beautifully captures the ache and counterintuitive thrill of 'the days as we know them, the world as we imagine the world' fading away by degrees—just don't be surprised if you find yourself longing for a contagion-spawned zombie bloodbath to counter the shambling lyricism." Writing for The A.V. Club, Alison Willmore gave a more positive appraisal: "Each deprivation is preceded by a flurry of emotion that leads to the film's most vivid sequences".

The film opened at 59 cinemas on its domestic release grossing £21,675 for the weekend 7–9 October 2011.
