= Jake Roberts (film editor) =

British film editor

- Born: 26 June 1977 (age 49); London, England
- Occupation: Film editor
- Years active: 1996–present

Jake Roberts is an English film editor.

== Career ==
Roberts is best known for his works on films Citadel (2012), Starred Up (2013), The Riot Club (2014), and Brooklyn (2015). For Hell or High Water (2016), Roberts was nominated (among several honors) for an Independent Spirit Award and the Academy Award for Best Film Editing at the 89th Academy Awards.

== Filmography ==
=== As an editor ===
- 28 Years Later: The Bone Temple (2026)
- Alien: Romulus (2024)
- Civil War (2024)
- Men (2022)
- You Resemble Me (2021)
- Devs (TV mini-series, 2020)
- Outlaw King (2018)
- The Hitman's Bodyguard (2017)
- Trespass Against Us (2016)
- Hell or High Water (2016)
- Mr. Burberry (short, 2016)
- Kanye West: "All Day" / "I Feel Like That" (short, 2015)
- Pressure (2015)
- Brooklyn (2015)
- The Riot Club (2014)
- Starred Up (2013)
- Skins (TV series, 2013)
- Foxy and Marina (short, 2013)
- Misfits (3 episodes, 2012)
- Citadel (2012)
- Tonight You're Mine (2011)
- Perfect Sense (2011)
- Donkeys (2010)
- I Love Luci (short, 2010)
- The Week We Went to War (TV series documentary) (5 episodes, 2009)
- Personal Affairs (2 episodes, 2009)
- Stacked (TV movie, 2008)
- Shot in Bombay (documentary, 2008)
- Office Tigers (documentary, 2006)
- Long Way Round (TV mini-series documentary) (3 episodes, 2004)
- The Last Great Wilderness (2002)
- Small Moments (short, 2001)
- Somersault (short, 2001)

== Accolades ==
Year	Award	Category	Nominated work	Result
2024	American Cinema Editors Awards	Best Edited Feature Film - Dramatic	Civil War	Pending
2016	Academy Awards	Best Film Editing	Hell or High Water	Nominated
2016	American Cinema Editors Awards	Best Edited Feature Film - Dramatic	Hell or High Water	Nominated
2016	Central Ohio Film Critics Association	Best Film Editing	Hell or High Water	Nominated
2016	Independent Spirit Awards	Best Editing	Hell or High Water	Nominated
2016	San Diego Film Critics Society Awards	Best Editing	Hell or High Water	Nominated
2016	San Francisco Film Critics Circle	Best Film Editing	Hell or High Water	Nominated
2016	Seattle Film Critics Awards	Best Film Editing	Hell or High Water	Nominated
2014	Irish Film and Television Awards	Best Editing (Film/TV Drama)	Starred Up	Won

== See also ==
- List of film director and editor collaborations
