= Shona Auerbach =

British film director and cinematographer

- Occupations: Film director and cinematographer
- Years active: 1996–present
- Notable work: Dear Frankie

Shona Auerbach is a British film director and cinematographer.

== Early career ==
Auerbach began her career as a stills photographer. She studied film at Manchester University and cinematography at Leeds before completing her Master of Arts at the Polish National Film School in Łódź. Her first directorial effort was the 1996 short subject Seven, which won her awards from the Munich International Festival of Film Schools, the Montecatini Filmvideo International Short Film Festival in Spain, and the Capalbio Cinema International Short Film Festival in Italy. She spent the next several years directing commercials while at the same time preparing her debut feature film, Dear Frankie, which was shown at numerous film festivals in 2004 and was released commercially in early 2005. She also served as cinematographer on both films.

== Awards and recognition ==
For Dear Frankie, Auerbach was nominated for the BAFTA Award for Best Newcomer, and the BAFTA Scotland Award for Best Director. She won the Heartland Film Festival Crystal Heart Award, the High Falls Film Festival Audience Award for Best Feature Film, the Jackson Hole Film Festival Cowboy Award for Best Feature Film, the Los Angeles IFP/West Film Festival Audience Award for Best International Feature Film, the Montreal World Film Festival Golden Zenith Award, the Seattle International Film Festival Women in Cinema Lena Sharpe Award, and the WinFemme Film Festival Award (part of Women's Image Network Awards) for Best Film or TV Show Directed by a Woman.

For Rudy, she won Best Feature Film at the Birmingham Film Festival, and the New Renaissance Film Festival.

== Personal life ==
Auerbach is married to cinematographer Graeme Dunn.
