= Sisse Graum Jørgensen =

Danish film producer (born 1972)

- Born: 26 August 1972 (age 53); Copenhagen, Denmark
- Other name: Sisse Graum Olsen
- Education: Copenhagen Business School
- Occupation: Producer
- Years active: 1991–present

Sisse Graum Jørgensen (born 26 August 1972) is a Danish film producer and sits on the board of the film company Zentropa. Films she has produced include Hævnen, Jagten, and Dear Wendy. She also sits on the advisory board for TrustNordisk, a Scandinavian international film distributor.

== Early life ==
Jørgensen was born in Copenhagen, Denmark where she received her Bachelor (HA) degree at the Danish Business School Handels højskolen.

== Career ==
In 2003 Graum Jørgensen became a member of the European Academy, which promotes European films and the film industry throughout the world.

Graum Jørgensen started her career making advertisements. In 1991 she worked on her first movie for Zentropa Productions APS as a production trainee and assistant producer for the co founder Peter Aalbæk Jensen. Ten years later she debuted as a producer with Niels Arden Opleys movie Chop Chop (Fogsvansen 2001).

Graum Jørgensen worked with Danish directors Lars Von Trier and Thomas Vinterberg, and, beginning in 2002, with Susanne Brier. The first movie they worked on was Biers' Open Hearts (Elsker dig for evigt 2002) and Jørgensen was the co producer. After this she and Brier worked together in several movies and she produced Brothers (Brødre 2004), After the Wedding (Efter brylluppet 2006) that was nominated for an Oscar. They also made Golden Globe, Oscar and EFA-winner In a Better World (Hævnen 2010). Their last collaborations was Love is all you need (Den skaldede frisør 2012) written by Anders Thomas Jensen and Susanne Bier and a post production drama A second chance (En chance til) premiered in 2015.

In 2006 she helped to organize a film initiative called "Advance Party", designed to promote the film industry in Scotland.

== Personal ==
Graum Jørgensen is married to Ulrik Jørgensen and has four children.

== Awards and nominations ==
Sisse Graum Jørgensen has produced many award-winning motion pictures. The Hunt (Jagten 2012) directed by Thomas Vinterber was nominated at the 2014 Oscar and Golden Globe for the best foreign film, as well as 29 awards and 37 nominations, including British independent Film Award 2012 (Best international independent film), and European film awards where they won for best screenwriter and nominated in four other categories, including Best Film. Other nominated and winning films are En Famillie (2010), Red Road(2006), and Perfect Sense (2011).

European Film Promotion chose Jørgensen as their "Producer on the Move" in 2003. Screen International wrote about her in their "Talent to Watch" and Variety's Cannes chose her as one of "10 Producers to Watch". In 2013 she won the Erik Ballings Rejselegat Prize handed out by the Nordic Film Council together with her co worker at Zentropa, Louise Vesth.

== Awards ==
- A Royal Affair (En Kongelig Affære 2012) : Danish film Academy Robert awards 2013, 8 wins including "Robert, Årets Score" and "Best Special Effects"; Golden Globe 2013, Nominated for Best foreign Language Film; Oscar Awards Foreign Language Film 2013, Nominated Best Foreign Language Film.
- The Hunt (Jagten 2012): Oscar Award 2014, Nominated Best Foreign Language Film; Golden Globe 2014, Nominated Best Foreign Language Film; Palm Spring International Film Festival 2014, FIPRESCI Best FL Film of the year, Best Actor: Mads Mikkelsen; Cannes, Festival de 2012, 3 wins – Best Actor: Mads Mikkelsen, Ecumenical Jury Award: Thomas Vinterberg
- In a Better World (Hævnen 2010): Oscar Award 2011, Best foreign Language Film; Rome international Film festival 2010, Marc’Aurelio Grand jury Award and Marc’Aurelio Audience Award; Arctic Film festival "Polar Lights in Murmansk 2011, Best Actor
- We shall overcome (Drommen 2006): Denmarks Film Academy Robert Award 2007, 6 wins including Best Script and Best Editing
- After the Wedding (Efter brylluppet 2006):Jury Special Prize, Audience Award, 2006 Film by the Sea International Film Festival; 2006 Cinefest Sudbury International Film Festival Audience Award
- Brothers (Brødre 2004): 2005 Sundance Film Festival; 2005 Boston Independent Film Festival Audience Award: Narrative, Audience Award: Best Feature Film; 2005 Creteil International Women's Film Festival, 2004 Hamburg Film Festival, Critics Award, Grand Prize, Audience Award: World Cinema – Dramatic

== Filmography ==
- 2001 – Fukssvansen / Chop Chop (Producer– as Sisse Graum Olsen)
- 2002 – Last great wilderness – (Co-producer– as Sisse Graum Olsen)
- 2002 – Open hearts (Producer)
- 2002 – Wilbur begår selvmord / Wilbur wants to kill himself (Producer)
- 2004 – Brødre / Brothers – (Producer– as Sisse Graum Olsen)
- 2004 – Dear Wendy – (Producer)
- 2006 – Drömmen/ We shall overcome (Producer – as Sisse Graum Olsen)
- 2006 – Efter brylluppet / After the wedding (Producer)
- 2006 – Red road (executive producer)
- 2007 – Hjemve / Just like home – (Producer)
- 2007 – Nietzsche – The early years – (Producer)
- 2008 – Den du frygter / Fear me not – (Producer)
- 2010 – En Familie / A family – (Producer)
- 2010 – Hævnen / In a better world – (Producer)
- 2011 – Perfect sense – (co-producer)
- 2012 – En kongelig affære / A royal affair – (Producer)
- 2012 – Jagten / The hunt – (Producer)
- 2012 – Den skaldede frisør / All you need is love (Producer)
- 2014 – Someone you love (Producer)
- 2014 – Salvation (Producer)
- 2015 – En chance til/ A Second Chance (Producer)
