= Dear Frankie =

- Theatrical release poster
- Directed by: Shona Auerbach
- Written by: Andrea Gibb
- Produced by: Caroline Wood
- Starring: Emily Mortimer; Gerard Butler; Jack McElhone; Sharon Small
- Cinematography: Shona Auerbach
- Edited by: Oral Norrie Ottey
- Music by: Alex Heffes
- Production company: Pathé
- Distributed by: Pathé Distribution
- Release dates: 4 May 2004 (Tribeca); 21 January 2005 (United Kingdom)
- Running time: 105 minutes
- Country: Scotland
- Languages: English; British Sign Language
- Box office: $2,980,136

Dear Frankie is a 2004 British drama film directed by Shona Auerbach and starring Emily Mortimer, Gerard Butler, Jack McElhone, and Sharon Small. The screenplay by Andrea Gibb focuses on a young single mother whose love for her son prompts her to perpetuate a deception designed to protect him from the truth about his father.

The film was critically acclaimed and won numerous awards, including two BAFTA Scotland Awards.

== Plot ==
Lizzie Morrison and nine-year-old deaf son Frankie frequently relocate to keep one step ahead of her abusive ex-husband and his family. They are accompanied by her opinionated, chain-smoking mother Nell. Newly relocated in the Scottish town of Greenock, Lizzie accepts a job at the local fish and chips shop owned by a friendly woman named Marie, and enrolls Frankie in school.

Through a Glasgow post office box, Frankie maintains a regular correspondence with someone he believes to be his father, Davey, who allegedly is a merchant seaman working on HMS Accra. In reality, the letters he receives are written by his mother, who prefers to maintain the lie instead of telling him why she fled her marriage.

When she learns that Accra will soon be arriving at the docks at Greenock, Lizzie in a panic concocts a scheme to hire a man to impersonate Davey. When her effort to find someone at the local pub fails, she enlists Marie's assistance. She arranges for her to meet an acquaintance who coincidentally is passing through town at the same time Accra will be in port.

When Lizzie and the stranger meet, he doesn't tell her his name. She explains the situation and gives him the letters for background. He agrees to spend a day with Frankie in exchange for the small amount Lizzie can offer him.

When the stranger arrives at their home to pick up Frankie, he brings with him a book about marine life (to Lizzie's surprise), one of Frankie's passions, and a bond is forged immediately. They spend a day together (with Lizzie secretly following them), collecting on Frankie's bet at a soccer match from a school mate, ordering chips, and later in the evening setting up another half-day visit.

The second day is magical, ending with a nice evening at a dance, as Frankie wins another bet by getting Lizzie and the stranger to dance together. Afterwards, they walk together to get around the "discuss no past" ground rules, and she tells the stranger about Frankie's deafness—a "present from his daddy"—and her reason for leaving her husband. She explains the letters from Frankie are so important to her because it is how she "hears" her son.

The stranger tells Lizzie she is a great mother for protecting Frankie. Returning home, Frankie gives the stranger a hand-carved wooden seahorse as a parting gift. At the door, after a long pause together, Lizzie and the stranger kiss goodbye. After he leaves, she discovers he has returned her payment, stuffed into her coat pocket.

Sometime later, Lizzie learns that her husband is terminally ill, and reluctantly visits the hospital without Frankie. She experiences her husband's angry fury again, when he demands to see Frankie. Later when she tells Frankie that his dad is really sick, he writes him a note and draws him a picture.

On a second visit, she delivers them to her husband, along with a snapshot of Frankie. Davey's death brings peace to them all.

Lizzie asks Marie about the stranger and she learns he is Marie's brother. Frankie's last letter shows that he has known the truth for a while—that the stranger was not his real dad. He knows too that Lizzie is sad, but she has him for support. The letter also indicates that Frankie intends to carry on with his life, telling about his real dad passing, his friends and their gold stars in school, and getting onto the reserve football team. He closes the letter by saying he hopes the stranger will visit again.

Lizzie finds Frankie sitting at end of a pier, and they enjoy a quiet moment together, looking out to sea.

== Cast ==
- Emily Mortimer as Lizzie
- Gerard Butler as The Stranger
- Jack McElhone as Frankie
- Sean Brown as Ricky
- Mary Riggans as Nell
- Sharon Small as Marie
- Cal Macaninch as Davey
- Sophie Main as Serious Girl
- Katy Murphy as Miss MacKenzie
- Jayd Johnson as Catriona
- Anna Hepburn as Headmistress
- Rony Bridges as Post Office Clerk
- Douglas Stewart Wallace as Stamp Shop Keeper
- Elaine M. Ellis as Librarian
- Carolyn Calder as Barmaid
- John Kazek as Ally
- Garry Collins as Waiter
- Anne Marie Timoney as Janet
- Maureen Johnson as Singer
- Andrea Gibb as Waitress
- Sharon MacKenzie as Staff Nurse
- Jonathan Pender as Frankie (voice)

== Production ==
In The Story, a bonus feature on the DVD release of the film, director Shona Auerbach and some of her cast discuss the project. The screenplay originated as a script for a 15-minute short submitted to producer Caroline Wood, who had requested writing samples from potential screenwriters for what would be Auerbach's film debut after several years of directing commercials. Auerbach was so enamored with Andrea Gibb's work she convinced her to expand it to feature length.

=== Casting ===
The production design by Jennifer Kernke and palette of colours used throughout the film were inspired by paintings created by the Glasgow Boys and Glasgow Girls, Glasgow School collectives whose artwork featured prosaic scenes of the Scottish countryside.

Jack McElhone was among the first group of boys Auerbach auditioned for the role of Frankie. She continued to see about one hundred more but was unable to find any who captured the essence of the character, as she perceived it, more impressively than he did. The role of the character listed as The Stranger in the credits, although he is addressed as Louis in one scene, still had not been cast just prior to the scheduled start of filming. When Auerbach met Gerard Butler, she instinctively knew he was perfect for the role and immediately offered it to him without having him read for her.

=== Filming locations ===
Dear Frankie was filmed on location in Scotland. Locations included Buchanan Street Stamps in Glasgow, Strathclyde, Greenock, and Inverclyde.

== Release ==
The film premiered at the Tribeca Film Festival in May 2004. It was screened in the Un Certain Regard section at the Cannes Film Festival, where it received a fifteen-minute standing ovation. It was also shown at the Copenhagen International Film Festival, the Edinburgh International Film Festival, the Toronto International Film Festival, the Bordeaux International Festival of Women in Cinema, the Aubagne Film Festival, the Dinard Festival of British Cinema, the Austin Film Festival, the Chicago International Film Festival, the Heartland Film Festival, the Milwaukee Film Festival, and the Scottsdale Film Festival before going into limited release in the UK and US.

The film grossed $1,341,332 in the US and $1,638,804 in other markets for a total worldwide box office of $2,980,136.

== Reception ==
=== Critical response ===
The film holds an 81% rating on Rotten Tomatoes based on 109 reviews, and a 91% positive rating based on 30,379 user reviews.

Roger Ebert of the Chicago Sun-Times said, "The filmmakers work close to the bone, finding emotional truth in hard, lonely lives ... What eventually happens, while not entirely unpredictable, benefits from close observation, understated emotions, unspoken feelings, and the movie's tact ... The bold long shot near the end of Dear Frankie allows the film to move straight as an arrow toward its emotional truth, without a single word or plot manipulation to distract us".

In the San Francisco Chronicle, Ruthe Stein called the film "deeply moving" and added, "Dear Frankie takes time weaving its magic ... Director Shona Auerbach doesn't rush anything in her remarkably accomplished first feature film. [She] has resurrected Butler's career ... and gotten an unforgettable performance from Mortimer ... Jack McElhone seems to be a natural, the kind of child actor you can't wait to have grow up to see what he'll be able to do then".

Peter Travers of Rolling Stone rated the film three out of four and commented, "What could have been a sentimental train wreck emerges as a funny and touching portrait of three bruised people ... The film is unhurried, unslick and easy to hold dear".

In Variety, David Rooney observed, "Material that might have turned to standard dysfunctional family treacle in other hands is given stirring poignancy, warmth and emotional insight in Shona Auerbach's assured first feature ... [She has] a firm command of the visual medium and an equally strong rapport with actors ... Auerbach and screenwriter Andrea Gibb spin a touching story that never descends into schmaltz despite ample potential. The film is anchored in part by its setting in the kind of milieu more common to classic British kitchen-sink dramas or the films of Ken Loach than to anything this emotionally tender. Enriched by subtle notes of humor, the intimate story is powered by well-drawn relationships and finely shaded characters. Not only the family bonds but also those of friendship and tentative romance are traced with delicate economy and nuance."

Carina Chocano of the Los Angeles Times stated the film "nestles comfortably in that Scottish-Celtic niche of cozy, overcast, working-class fairy tales that seem to smell faintly of fried fish and beer ... Not that Dear Frankie aspires to any kind of hardened realism. On the contrary, it caters to a particular type of Anglophile fantasy, the kind where the china doesn't match and the chintz is dingy, but people look out for one another and love sprouts easily in the humidity ... [Its] surprises are few and low-key, but the story wraps up nicely. In that way, the movie is not unlike the fish dinners Frankie ... procures from Marie - slightly soggy and bland, but as warm, starchy and satisfying as a box of fries".

In the Tampa Bay Times, Steve Persall graded the film B and added, "Auerbach and screenwriter Andrea Gibb handle these circumstances with such understated grace that sap becomes special. Not perfect, but deeper, more affecting than U.S. moviegoers are accustomed to seeing. It's easy to guess what happens, but we're hooked anyway. A last-reel twist almost spoils the effect; we're waiting for something to go wrong with such a delicate story. Then, almost magically, the performances pull us through the cumbersome moments, resulting in a pat finale that honestly feels good."

In the UK, Radio Times awarded the film four out of five and commented, "This simple story is rich with precise observation and it tugs at the heartstrings without being maudlin or manipulative ... With its sincere and perceptive script, the beautifully shot film vividly captures the raw emotions of its complex characters ... Despite occasional flickers of a fairy-tale ending, Auerbach ultimately resists the temptation, maintaining the realism and integrity that give this thoughtful feature its bittersweet charm". Philip French of The Observer described it as "a well-meaning but almost totally unconvincing tale ... [that's] a sentimental mess", while Peter Bradshaw of The Guardian stated, "This film struck me as sucrose and false when it premiered at last year's Cannes film festival. A second viewing certainly points up the presence of good actors doing an honest job, but they cannot do anything about something so mawkish and fundamentally unconvincing."

In his review in The New York Times, Stephen Holden called the film "a heaping bowl of Scottish blarney", a "manipulative tearjerker", and "a fraudulent yarn riddled with plot holes and improbabilities and topped by a cynical final twist that pulls the rug out from under the story".

=== Accolades ===
- 2005 BAFTA Award for Best Newcomer (Shona Auerbach, nominee)
- 2004 BAFTA Scotland Award for Best Director (Auerbach, nominee)
- 2004 BAFTA Scotland Award for Best First Time Performance (Jack McElhone, nominee)
- 2005 European Film Awards Jameson People's Choice Award for Best European Actress (Emily Mortimer, nominee)
- 2004 London Film Critics Circle Award for Best Actress (Mortimer, nominee)
- 2004 Heartland Film Festival Crystal Heart Award (Auerbach, winner)
- 2004 High Falls Film Festival Audience Award for Best Feature Film (winner)
- 2004 Jackson Hole Film Festival Cowboy Award for Best Feature Film (winner)
- 2004 Los Angeles IFP/West Film Festival Audience Award for Best International Feature Film (winner)
- 2004 Montreal World Film Festival Golden Zenith Award (winner)
- 2004 Seattle International Film Festival Women in Cinema Lena Sharpe Award (Auerbach, winner)
- 2004 WinFemme Film Festival Award for Best Film or TV Show Directed by a Woman (winner)

== See also ==
- List of films featuring the deaf and hard of hearing
