= The Legend of Barney Thomson =

- Directed by: Robert Carlyle
- Screenplay by: Colin McLaren; Richard Cowan
- Based on: The Long Midnight of Barney Thomson by Douglas Lindsay
- Produced by: John G. Lenic; Kaleena Kiff; Brian Coffey; Holly Brydson; Richard Cowan
- Starring: Robert Carlyle; Emma Thompson; Ray Winstone; Ashley Jensen; Brian Pettifer
- Cinematography: Fabian Wagner
- Distributed by: Icon Film Distribution(United Kingdom); TVA Films (Canada)
- Release dates: 17 June 2015 (Edinburgh International Film Festival); 24 July 2015
- Running time: 94 minutes
- Countries: United Kingdom; Canada
- Language: English
- Box office: $1,329,376

The Legend of Barney Thomson, known in the United States as Barney Thomson, is a 2015 comedy thriller film based on the 1999 novel The Long Midnight of Barney Thomson by Douglas Lindsay. It is the directorial debut of Robert Carlyle, who also stars in the film, alongside Emma Thompson, Ray Winstone, Ashley Jensen and Brian Pettifer. It was previewed at the 2015 Edinburgh International Film Festival in June 2015 before its release on 24 July 2015. The film also won the BAFTA Scotland Award for Best Feature Film.

== Plot ==
Set in Glasgow, the film centres around 50-year-old Barney Thomson, who works at Henderson's Barbers in Bridgeton and lives a life of desperate mediocrity. Barney's uninteresting life is turned upside down when he enters the grotesque and comically absurd world of a serial killer after accidentally killing his boss Wullie.

The film starts with Thomson, who lives a dull life as a Glasgow barber for 20 years, looked over by the owner James' son, the manager Wullie. Detective Inspector Holdall, meanwhile, is inspecting a string of body parts mailed across the city; due to a lack of progress, the case is handed over to D.I. June Robertson.

Wullie prepares to fire Thomson due to his pessimistic outbursts affecting business; after work one day, Thomson desperately pleads with Wullie, resulting in a struggle that causes him to accidentally stab him in the chest with a small set of scissors. A panicked Thomson bags the corpse and puts it in his car, which is witnessed by his friend Charlie.

Holdall begins questioning and following Thomson, who denies any knowledge of Wullie's habits or whereabouts. Resorting to his mother Cemolina for help, Thomson hides the body at her place, and is later horrified to discover that she chopped it up, shrink wrapped and labeled the parts, and kept them in the freezer. When a slip of the tongue by Charlie causes Thomson's younger coworker Chris Porter to suspect him, Thomson quietly confesses it an accident. When Chris attempts to attack him, a frightened Thomson strikes him in the chest with a mop, inadvertently killing him. Wrapping him up, he brings him to Cemolina's apartment; however, when he removes Wullie's remains from the freezer, he notices an extra hand inside of it, along with a notebook with addresses to various places that the killer's body parts have been mailed; along with that, he finds out that his mother has been prostituting herself for younger men.

Meanwhile, later, Thomson breaks into Chris' apartment to place Wullie's remains and frame him, but is foiled when he finds that his freezer is too small to hold the body; when Holdall and his partner investigate, Thomson leaves the parts behind as he flees. Confronting his mother, he realizes that she's the killer, and that she killed and mailed off her dates. After revealing that his father left, but not far and never contacted him, she strains herself as she cruelly mocks Thomson before dying of a heart attack (or possibly a stroke).

After Cemolina's services, Thomson dumps Chris' body in Loch Lubnaig, and he angrily strangles Charlie when he suspects that he knows about Chris, though ashamedly leaves.

The next day, James makes Thomson head barber, but he's called into the middle of the woods. There, both police duos confront each other, and in a rival shootout, they're all killed. Though Holdall accuses him, Thomson reveals the real circumstances, though Holdall dies before hearing it all.

With his name cleared, Thomson is satisfied as he becomes a local legend for being the only survivor.

== Cast ==
- Robert Carlyle as Barney Thomson
- Emma Thompson as Cemolina, Barney's mother
- Ray Winstone as Detective Inspector Holdall
- Ashley Jensen as Detective Inspector June Robertson
- Martin Compston as Chris Porter, barber
- Kevin Guthrie as Detective Sergeant MacPherson
- Sam Robertson as Detective Sergeant Sam Jobson
- Brian Pettifer as Charlie, Barney's friend
- Stephen McCole as Wullie Henderson, Barney's boss
- Eileen McCallum as Mrs. Gaffney
- James Cosmo as James Henderson, Wullie's father and the owner of Henderson's Barbers
- Barbara Rafferty as Jean Monkrieff
- Tom Courtenay as Chief Superintendent McManaman
- Anne Downie as Lizzie
- Ann Scott-Jones as Theresa
- Sarah McCardie as Sheena
- Skye Cooper Barr as Margaret
- Dolina MacLennan as Mrs. Kerr

== Reception ==
The review aggregator Rotten Tomatoes reports a 61% proportion of positive reviews, based on 33 reviews and a weighted average score of 5.9/10. The website's critical consensus reads, "The Legend of Barney Thomson may not quite live up to its grandiose title, but it offers a fine calling card for debuting director Carlyle, and Emma Thompson's performance adds a spark." At the review aggregator Metacritic, the film has a weighted average score of 59 out of 100, based on nine reviews, indicating "mixed or average reviews".

Writing for The List, Eddie Harrison gave the film two out of five stars and commented that the film's "brand of gallows humour feels woefully dated; it’s such a shame that Carlyle’s poor selection of script has rendered his first attempt to direct as dead on arrival." He also criticised the film's ending as being "delivered on the indulgent level of a student film."

David Jenkins, writing for Little White Lies, gave the film a negative review, concluding it as "Awful, anachronistic material delivered with a total paucity of charm."
