= Advance Party (film series) =

Fim series concept

Advance Party is the name given to a concept of three films which are all to follow a set of rules proposed by executive producers Gillian Berrie, Lone Scherfig and Anders Thomas Jensen. The concept came out of discussion between Lars von Trier, Berrie, Scherfig and Jensen. Each film is to be made by different first-time directors and producers. The production companies Sigma Films (Glasgow) and Zentropa (Denmark) are behind the concept.

Scherfig and Jensen created a list of characters and gave them back stories, which the three directors could then use to build their story.

Casting for all three films was to be done at the same time by the three different directors, due to the intended shared cast.

== Films ==
Red Road was the first film in the trilogy to be released in 2006, directed by Andrea Arnold (Glasgow). The second, directed by Morag McKinnon (Glasgow), Donkeys, was completed and released in 2010 and Mikkel Nørgaard's (Copenhagen) film is reportedly in "development limbo".
