= After the Wedding (2006 film) =

- Theatrical release poster
- Danish: Efter brylluppet
- Directed by: Susanne Bier
- Screenplay by: Anders Thomas Jensen
- Story by: Susanne Bier; Anders Thomas Jensen
- Produced by: Sisse Graum Olsen
- Starring: Mads Mikkelsen; Sidse Babett Knudsen; Rolf Lassgård
- Cinematography: Morten Søborg
- Edited by: Pernille Bech Christensen; Morten Højbjerg
- Music by: Johan Söderqvist
- Production companies: Det Danske Filminstitut; Sigma Films; Sveriges Television; Zentropa Entertainments
- Distributed by: Nordisk Film Biografdistribution (Denmark); Sony Pictures Releasing International; Nordisk Film; Svenska Filminstitutet (Sweden)
- Release dates: 24 February 2006 (Denmark); 1 September 2006 (Sweden)
- Running time: 124 minutes
- Countries: Denmark; Sweden
- Languages: Danish; English
- Box office: $11.6 million

After the Wedding (Danish: Efter brylluppet) is a 2006 drama film directed by Susanne Bier and starring Mads Mikkelsen and Sidse Babett Knudsen. The film was a critical success and was nominated for the Academy Award for Best Foreign Language Film, but lost to The Lives of Others.

== Plot ==
Jacob Petersen manages an Indian orphanage. With a small staff, he works as hard as he can to keep the orphanage afloat and is personally invested in the young charges—particularly Pramod, whom he has cared for since his birth. The orphanage has been in danger of collapse for eight years and faces bankruptcy. A Danish corporation offers a substantial donation to maintain the orphanage if Jacob returns to Denmark, where he grew up, to receive the donation in person. Apparently, the CEO, Jörgen Hansson, wishes to meet Jacob.

Upset when he learns that Jacob must travel to Copenhagen, Pramod insists that he return for Pramod's birthday, which is in eight days. Jacob departs for Denmark; once there he's greeted by a driver and a young man named Christian and checked into a luxurious suite paid for by the corporation.

Jacob meets with Jörgen, who says he's still considering which project to fund. This surprises Jacob, who had understood that the decision was already made when he was invited to Copenhagen. Christian is marrying Jörgen's daughter Anna, and Jörgen invites Jacob to the wedding. During the ceremony, Jörgen's wife, Helene, notices Jacob. They are formally introduced during the reception, but not for the first time: 20 years earlier, she was the love of his life, but he was unfaithful with her best friend and they broke up.

During Anna's speech at the marriage festivities, Jacob learns that she isn't Jörgen's biological daughter; his suspicion that she might be his own is confirmed by Helene the next day. Jacob is angry to just be learning this now. Helene claims that they'd tried to track him down in India. She is compelled to tell Anna about Jacob; the two meet and get along well, if slightly awkwardly.

Jörgen stalls the negotiations relating to funding, which distresses Jacob because of his promise to return for Pramod's birthday. Jacob attempts to explain, but the disappointed Pramod cuts the phone call short. Jörgen discloses that he will create a foundation in Jacob and Anna's names and fund it with a large sum of money. One of the conditions of the contract would be that Jacob must live in Denmark. At first, Jacob cannot comply, thinking of Pramod and the other children who have been part of his life for so long; he also resents the implication that he could be bought by Jörgen.

When Jacob storms out, Jörgen runs after him and admits the real motivation: he is terminally ill. Jörgen had brought Jacob to Denmark so he could care for Anna and Helene, as well as Jörgen's twin sons Morten and Martin. Angered at this deception, Jacob hastily leaves for his hotel room. Later, Anna arrives distressed because she has just discovered Christian with another woman. Jacob comforts her, realizing his need for her in his life. He signs the contract with Jörgen with the conditions intact.

Jörgen dies. On Jacob's next visit to India, construction work at the orphanage is well underway. Jacob invites Pramod to come to Denmark to live with him, but partly because Jacob used to rail against the rich, Pramod decides to stay in his home country.

== Cast ==
- Mads Mikkelsen as Jacob Petersen
- Rolf Lassgård as Jörgen Lennart Hansson
- Sidse Babett Knudsen as Helene Hansson
- Stine Fischer Christensen as Anna Louisa Hansson
- Christian Tafdrup as Christian
- Mona Malm as Mrs. Hansson
- Meenal Patel as Mrs. Shaw
- Neeral Mulchandani as Pramod

== Release ==
The film premiered in Denmark on 24 February 2006. The film had its North American premiere as a gala at the 2006 Toronto International Film Festival on 15 September 2006. The film opened in wide release in the United Kingdom on 9 March 2007. It opened in limited release in the United States on 30 March 2007.

== Reception ==
=== Critical response ===
On review aggregator website Rotten Tomatoes, the film holds an approval rating of 88% based on 105 reviews, and an average rating of 7.42/10. The site's critical consensus reads, "The cast brings After the Wedding's melodramatic script to life, creating a movie that is emotionally raw and satisfying." Metacritic gave the film a weighted average score of 78 out of 100, based on 29 critics, indicating "generally favorable reviews".

Time magazine's Richard Schickel named the film one of the top 10 movies of 2007, ranking it at #4, calling it a "dark, richly mounted film". While Schickel saw the film as possibly "old-fashioned stylistically, and rather manipulative in its plotting", he also saw "something deeply satisfying in the way it works out the fates of its troubled, yet believable characters."

=== Accolades ===
- Academy Awards
  - Best Foreign Language Film (nominated)
- Bodil Awards
  - Best Supporting Actress (Fischer Christensen, won)
  - Best Film (Bier, nominated)
  - Best Actor (Lassgård, nominated)
  - Best Actress (Knudsen, nominated)
- European Film Awards
  - Best Actor (Mikkelsen, nominated)
  - Best Director (Bier, nominated)
- Festroia International Film Festival
  - Jury Special Prize (Bier, won)
  - Best Actor (Lassgård, won)
- Film by the Sea International Film Festival
  - Audience Award (Bier, won)
- Robert Awards
  - Best Supporting Actress (Fischer Christensen, won)
  - Best Actor (Mikkelsen, nominated)
  - Best Actress (Knudsen, nominated)
  - Best Cinematography (Søborg, nominated)
  - Best Costume Design (Manon Rasmussen, nominated)
  - Best Editor (Bech Christensen and Højbjerg, nominated)
  - Best Film (Bier and Jørgensen, nominated)
  - Best Make-Up (Charlotte Laustsen, nominated)
  - Best Screenplay, Original (Jensen, nominated)
  - Best Sound (Eddie Simonsen and Kristian Eidnes Andersen, nominated)
  - Best Supporting Actor (Lassgård, nominated)
- Rouen Nordic Film Festival
  - Best Actress (Knudsen, won)

== Remake ==
In February 2018, actress Julianne Moore and writer-director husband Bart Freundlich announced plans to remake After the Wedding for an English-speaking audience, taking place in New York and India. Production began in late spring of 2018. The remake premiered at the Sundance Film Festival on 24 January 2019 and was theatrically released on 9 August 2019. Actress Michelle Williams starred alongside Moore.

== See also ==
- Cinema of Denmark
