= Damnation (TV series) =

American period drama television series

- Genre: Period drama
- Created by: Tony Tost
- Starring: Killian Scott; Logan Marshall-Green; Sarah Jones; Chasten Harmon; Christopher Heyerdahl; Melinda Page Hamilton; Joe Adler
- Composer: Adam Taylor
- Country of origin: United States
- Original language: English
- No. of seasons: 1
- No. of episodes: 10

Production
- Executive producers: Tony Tost; Guymon Casady; Daniel Rappaport; James Mangold; David Mackenzie; Gillian Berrie; Adam Kane
- Producers: Tom Cox; Jordy Randall; Nellie Nugiel; Brian Dennis
- Production locations: Calgary, Alberta, Canada
- Cinematography: Giles Nuttgens; Pierre Jodoin
- Editors: Adam Bluming; Curtis Thurber
- Camera setup: Single-camera
- Running time: 41–54 minutes
- Production companies: No Possum Productions; Entertainment 360; Turnpike; Universal Cable Productions

Original release
- Network: USA Network (US); Netflix (international)
- Release: November 7, 2017 – January 18, 2018

Damnation is an American period drama television series. The series was ordered on May 12, 2017. The series is a co-production between Universal Cable Productions and Netflix. Netflix streamed the show worldwide outside the United States, where it aired on USA Network. The series premiered on November 7, 2017. On January 25, 2018, it was announced that the series had been cancelled after one season. It was removed from Netflix in 2023.

== Plot ==
Set in 1931 amidst the American labor wars of the Great Depression, Damnation follows Seth Davenport, a man with a violent past who poses as a preacher as he rallies townsfolk to stand up against greedy industrialists and the corruption of the local bankers and businessmen. He is opposed by Creeley Turner, an ex-con and Pinkerton detective brought in to stop Davenport's strike. Neither the townsfolk nor the industrialists know that Seth and Creeley are estranged brothers.

According to creator and showrunner Tony Tost, Damnation is "1/3 Clint Eastwood, 1/3 John Steinbeck, 1/3 James Ellroy. That is, it takes some characters you’d normally see in a tough western, plops them in the world of Grapes of Wrath, and places them in the sort of pulpy paranoid narrative you see in Ellroy’s novels."

== Background ==
The Farmers' Holiday Association campaign for a farm strike in the early 1930s was the event on which the story is based; the Iowa locale in the series is based on Plymouth County, Iowa, during this time, the strike and related events in the county seat of Le Mars, Iowa, and rural areas of the county beginning in early May 1932. This was also the period when the penny auction became a common farmer tactic.

A coal miners' strike at the same time in Kentucky, known as the Harlan County War or Bloody Harlan, is the basis for that element of the plot. The Sheriff J. H. Blair and Florence Reece are historical characters, with Reece's folk song "Which Side Are You On?" (performed in the second episode) being inspired by Sheriff Blair's actions during the Harlan County War.

The Pinkerton Detective Agency, which employs Creeley Turner and the William J. Burns International Detective Agency, which employs Connie Nunn, are real agencies that focused on strikebreaking in the 1930s.

The villainous Black Legion vigilante group in Damnation is based on the 1930s militant fascistic paramilitary group of the same name. The Black Legion terrorized ethnic, political and religious minorities throughout the Midwest, targeting labor organizers and striking workers in particular.

== Cast ==
=== Main ===
- Killian Scott as Seth Davenport, an enigmatic preacher with a mysterious past who is behind the strikes in Holden County.
- Logan Marshall-Green as Creeley Turner, Seth's older brother, a convicted murderer, and a Pinkerton detective.
- Sarah Jones as Amelia Davenport, Seth's politically radical wife, who writes inflammatory sermons under the alias "Dr. Samuel T. Hopkins."
- Chasten Harmon as Bessie Louvin, an African American prostitute at the local brothel, who is literate and cunning, and is hired by Creeley to be his secretary.
- Christopher Heyerdahl as Don Berryman, the amoral sheriff of Holden County who runs the town's bootlegging and gambling operations.
- Melinda Page Hamilton as Connie Nunn, a cold-blooded and murderous agent of the William J. Burns International Detective Agency, who believes that Seth Davenport killed her strikebreaking husband.
- Joe Adler as D. L. Sullivan, a reporter for the town's local newspaper, who nurses literary ambitions and comes to sympathize with the Davenports' labor crusade.

=== Recurring ===
- Paul Rae as Melvin Stubbs, a local food distributor and the grandmaster of the Black Legion, who is campaigning to replace Berryman as sheriff in an upcoming election.
- Phillipa Domville as Martha Riley, the wife of Sam Riley, the late leader of the farmers' strike.
- David Haysom as Deputy Sheriff Raymond Berryman, Sheriff Berryman's dimwitted and occasionally brutal nephew.
- Dan Donohue as Calvin Rumple, a corrupt local banker who is fixing food prices in the county at the behest of powerful industrial interests.
- Tom Butler as Burt Babbage, the editor of the local newspaper who makes sure no news of the strike is reported.
- Juan Javier Cardenas as Lew Nez, a mixed-race childhood friend of Seth and Creeley's who is wanted in five states for bank robbery.
- Arnold Pinnock as Victor, an African American dairy farmer and World War I veteran.
- Teach Grant as Preston Riley, Sam's alcoholic cousin.
- Gabriel Mann as Martin Eggers Hyde, PhD, a highly educated fixer for the industrialist Duvall family, who controls Creeley Turner's actions and fate.
- Zach McGowan as Tennyson Duvall, an ambitious, art-loving philanthropist heir to the Duvall family fortune who aspires to replace farmers with modern industrial processes.
- Timothy V. Murphy as Gram Turner, Seth and Creeley's cruel father and a mercenary for oil interests.
- Bradley Stryker as Tanner Phillips, an employee of the local food distributor and one of the leaders of the Black Legion.
- Rohan Mead as Sam Riley Jr., the son of Sam Riley, the late leader of the farmers' strike.
- Alexis McKenna as Brittany Butler, a young girl orphaned and then adopted by the murderous Connie Nunn to help her pose as a grieving mother.
- Hannah Masi as Cynthia Rainey, Seth's first love from his youth in Wyoming.
- Nola Augustson as Della, the madam of the local brothel and Sheriff Berryman's sister-in-law.

=== Special Guests ===
- Luke Harper as Pitchfork Perry, a traveling professional wrestler on the carnival circuit.

=== Guest stars ===
- Blair Williams as Sam Riley.
- Thomas Nicholson as Remy Johnson.
- Jerod Blake as Prisoner #2.

== Production ==
Originally, Aden Young was set to play the lead role, but he dropped out due to creative differences and was later replaced by Killian Scott.

== Episodes ==
No.	Title	Directed by	Written by	Original release date	US viewers (millions)
1	"Sam Riley's Body"	Adam Kane	Tony Tost	November 7, 2017	0.91
A local farmer strike, led by Seth Davenport and Sam Riley in Holden, Iowa becomes a powder keg when Pinkerton operative Creeley Turner shoots Sam dead while escorting a strikebreaker. Three thugs from Chicago try to kill Seth and his wife Amelia, only to be overpowered and killed. In Kentucky, detective Connie Nunn is on the hunt for Seth, whom she believes killed her husband. Creeley hires a prostitute named Bessie to act as his secretary, since he's illiterate. Creeley then kills the strikebreaker and frames Sam's son for it. When Sam Jr. is arrested during his father's wake, Seth decides to confront Creeley, and we learn that the two men are estranged brothers. Seth decides to send a message to the town and his nemesis, banker Calvin Rumple; he crucifies Sam Riley's body across the front of Rumple's bank in town, with the sign "Which side are you on?" hung around his neck.
2	"Which Side Are You On?"	Adam Kane	Tony Tost	November 14, 2017	0.77
Creeley investigates what his brother's life is like now. Cub reporter D. L. Sullivan collects the townspeople's opinions on the strikes. The anti-union vigilante "Black Legion" fire on Seth's parishioners. Bessie pays off the local newspaper editor, asking him not to publish anything about Sam Riley's death or crucifixion and she begins to collect information on strikes across the country. Nearby in Des Moines, Rumple meets with the mysterious Martin Eggers Hyde, Ph.D., the man who hired Creely. Hyde instructs Rumple to begin auctioning farms to one of his agents. Nunn continues her search for Seth while sabotaging a miner's strike in Harlan, Kentucky. She kills a strike leader, orphaning his young daughter Brittany. Seth organizes a protest march with the farmers and hunts down one of the Black Legion members but refrains from killing him when he sees a cross formed from light on the floor. It is revealed that Bessie is the sheriff's illegitimate child. Amelia meets Creeley when he breaks into her house and warns her to leave Seth and take her cause elsewhere. He leaves her with a photograph of a younger Seth with a mysterious young woman.
3	"One Penny"	Rod Lurie	Tony Tost	November 21, 2017	0.79
Amelia questions Seth about the strikebreaker and his past but Seth is evasive. Rumple has begun foreclosing and auctioning farms, including the farm of Sam's widow Martha. Creeley and Bessie, as a blossoming interracial couple, come to the attention of the racist Black Legion who ambush them and take Creeley hostage. Amelia hatches a plot to save the Riley farm; painting cigar boxes to look like bibles and hiding weapons in them. The Black Legion leave Creely to hang in a deserted shed. In Ohio, Nunn has taken in Brittany and is grooming her to be her daughter and protege. Connie informs Brittany that her husband Leonard was tied up in a burning car in Arkansas and left to die. Bessie tracks down Creeley and guilts her father, Sheriff Berryman, into rescuing him from the Black Legion. Seth, Amelia and the farmers take their fake bibles to the Riley farm auction and threaten the auctioneer and potential buyers, allowing Martha Riley to buy back her farm for one penny. Seth tells Amelia that the young woman in the photograph is Cynthia Jo Rainey and that his hatred of Creely stems from the latter's role in her death.
4	"The Emperor of Ice Cream"	Rod Lurie	Michael D. Fuller	November 28, 2017	0.81
Nunn arrives in Detroit, where Earl Donahue is leading an autoworker strike. In Iowa, Rumple tells Creeley that he's arranged to have milk delivered to the local ice cream vendor to stop the strike. When a bootlegger's truck arrives at a blockade outside of town, Seth and the farmers figure out that they are smuggling milk, smash the barrels, and drive the men off. Amelia confronts newspaper editor Burt Babbage for not covering the farmers' strike and reveals to Sullivan that she's the secret author of the pamphlets that have inspired him. In Detroit, after Donahue's wife and child leave the house, Connie kills Earl and other strike leaders, discovering that one of them had seen Seth and got one of his pamphlets in Iowa. Seth tells Amelia that Creeley is his half-brother and that his mother was a prostitute. Seth says Creeley "doesn't have an ounce of grit". Creeley pits the corn farmers against the milk farmers by persuading dairyman Victor to deliver milk to the ice cream shop. When Victor makes the milk delivery in town under Creeley's protection, a shoot-out occurs. Creeley kills several armed corn farmers with stunning quickness and accuracy while claiming to act in self-defense. A stunned, blood-soaked Seth cowers while Creeley stands over him, telling his brother: "People change".
5	"Den of Lost Souls"	Eva Sorhaug	Julia Cohen	December 14, 2017	0.50
In Des Moines, Creeley meets with Eggers Hyde, who warns Creeley that he'll return him to prison if he doesn't stop the strike. He tells Creeley that he's hired someone to kill both Seth and Amelia but refuses to reveal the assassin's identity. In Holden, Amelia and Sullivan decide to start an underground newspaper to spread the truth about the farmers' strike. Creeley searches for the hired assassin, telling Bessie that he needs his brother alive. As Seth practices his shooting, he hears someone break into his house. It's Lew Nez, a childhood friend who is also a wanted outlaw. As Seth and Lew terrorize Rumple, Creeley tries to warn Amelia to leave town. When she refuses the warning, Creeley locates the bodies of the three thugs whom Seth and Amelia killed in the first episode. At the carnival, the hired assassin is revealed to be disguised as a vacuum salesman. He follows Seth and Amelia but can't distinguish between them and Lew (also in disguise as a preacher) and another woman. Just as the assassin is about to shoot, a child screams, seeing the corpse of one of the thugs on a Ferris wheel. The assassin's bullet hits Lew in the arm. Both Seth and Lew chase the assassin into a nearby cornfield while Creeley again warns Amelia to leave town. Seth tracks the assassin to a barn, where the assassin manages to overpower him. Creeley then arrives and saves him. At gunpoint, Creeley tells Seth that he's going to turn him in because he's done being punished for Seth's sins.
6	"In Wyoming Fashion"	Eva Sorhaug	Kevin Lau	December 21, 2017	0.61
In an extended flashback, we see Seth, Creeley, and Lew in Wyoming a decade earlier. The three young men worked as hired guns for Seth and Creeley's short-tempered father Gram, helping him clear the land for an oil company. In the present day, Creeley accuses Seth of being a fraud and framing him for murder. Lew then arrives and Creeley is forced to drop his weapon. Food distributor Melvin Stubbs announces his candidacy for sheriff. In another flashback, the younger Seth tries to protect the timid Creeley from their father and is beaten for it. Gram forces Creely to kill an unarmed man, telling him to put a notch on his gun for the deed. In the present day, Creeley awakes and returns to the brothel, telling Bessie that he'll never be free of Eggers Hyde unless Seth confesses to the murders Creeley was arrested for. Sheriff Berryman arrests Creeley for the dead thug, though Creeley says it was Seth. Sheriff Berryman arrives at the church and finds the bodies Creeley has placed there. Amelia strikes a deal: since Sheriff Berryman needs the farmers' votes to beat Stubbs in the election, she bargains for extra time to find the real killer. Seth and Lew rob Rumple's bank in order to help fund the struggling farmers. Creeley witnesses this from his cell in the sheriff's station and Seth acknowledges his brother while fleeing with Lew. In a final flashback, as Seth recovers from his beating at the hands of their father, Creeley cuts his own side out of guilt of his first kill, giving a notch to himself instead of his gun. In the present day, Creeley returns to the brothel after being released by Sheriff Berryman, only to find Eggers Hyde waiting for him. Bessie watches as Creeley is driven away by Eggers Hyde to an uncertain fate.
7	"A Different Species"	Alex Graves	Nazrin Choudhury	December 28, 2017	0.67
Parked near a prison work gang being beaten by vicious guards, Eggers Hyde voices his displeasure at Creeley's work in Holden. Seth and Amelia discover that a man named Tuck Tandy tried to buy up both the Riley farm and a fertilizer plant in a nearby county. Amelia meets Nunn and Brittany, posing as the wife and daughter of a deceased strike leader. Creeley arrives at a remote stable, where he meets industrialist scion Tennyson Duvall and a fellow Pinkerton agent named Johnson. Seth explores the fertilizer plant, discovering that workers there are enlisting homeless men for secret chemical tests on military equipment. After killing Johnson in a fight staged for Duvall's amusement, Hyde gives Creeley a new assignment: Creeley must return to Holden and kill Seth in order to secure his freedom. In Holden, a new banker named John Dyson strikes a deal with the Black Legion, providing them with money and weapons to massacre the farmers. Stubbs is revealed to be the leader of the Black Legion. Bessie is caught watching this and she runs away with the Black Legion chasing her. Amelia reveals to Nunn that she's also a widow and that her first husband was killed by a strikebreaker in Arkansas around the time Nunn's husband died. Seth gives Amelia paperwork from the fertilizer plant and Amelia realizes that her father's textiles company is involved in the Duvall conspiracy. On the way back to Holden, Creeley sees the same prison gang and vicious guards. He shoots and kills the two guards from a train, allowing the prisoners to run for freedom.
8	"The Goodness of Men"	Katie Jacobs	Rayna McClendon	January 4, 2018	0.63
Seth and Amelia discover Bessie in the church and hide her from the Black Legion. Creeley returns to town and meets Dyson, who presents Creeley with papers that guarantee his freedom if he kills Seth. Bessie tells Seth and Amelia what she has learned, and in return they offer to protect her. Stubbs threatens the farmers, while Connie tries to take care of a sick Brittany. Seth learns that Stubbs plans to have Sam Jr. publicly lynched. Seth informs Sheriff Berryman of this plan, but the sheriff refuses to help. Creeley shows up at Seth's house to kill him, but Bessie stops him; Creeley and Bessie then share their first kiss. The Black Legion find a picture of Seth and Creely when they ransack his room at the brothel. Sullivan and Amelia distribute their underground newspaper at her father's factory. In a series of flashbacks, it's revealed that Cynthia Rainey and Seth were lovers, and that when ordered to burn the Raineys' church by his father, Seth instead tried to run away with Cynthia. Creeley tells Gram of this, Cynthia and her father are murdered, and Seth stabs his father to death, leaving Creely to be arrested for his crimes. The Black Legion prepares to hang Sam Jr. Seth is discovered trying to rescue the boy in disguise and Creeley watches as the Black Legion prepare to hang Sam and Seth.
9	"Dark Was the Night, Cold Was the Ground"	Kate Dennis	Julia Cohen & Michael D. Fuller	January 11, 2018	0.52
In a Wyoming flashback to 1924, Seth's father murders Cynthia Rainey and her preacher father, and Seth murders his father and his men in retaliation. Seth prepares to shoot Creeley, but can't bring himself to do it. Instead, he frames Creeley for the murders. Back in the present, as Seth and Sam Jr are being hanged, Creeley intervenes and saves them. Amelia tells DL that her industrialist father used to hire strikebreakers to attack workers when she was a little girl, setting her on her political path. With the Black Legion seizing the town, an outgunned Sheriff Berryman gets his daughter Bessie out of town, while Seth, Creeley and the others retreat to Martha's farm and prepare for retaliation from the Black Legion. Amelia and DL are captured while trying to head back into Holden, and taken to Stubbs. Connie is shocked to discover that Seth didn't kill her husband. Scores of Black Legion show up at Martha's farm and begin to attack. Meanwhile, the Sheriff reveals the truth to Bessie about her mother, who was not a prostitute like she assumed, but a singer known as Memphis Pearl. DL tells Amelia that he's dedicating his book to her as they try to escape from the Black Legion, but despite some impressive sharpshooting from DL, the two are caught once again. At Martha's farm, the Black Legion begin to overwhelm the resistance, until Victor sets off dynamite. However, one of the Legion members uses the machine gun, and the farmers and others are forced to retreat inside. Preston Riley creates a diversion with a tractor to allow Seth to destroy the machine gun with a grenade. Seth and Creeley make a grim discovery, however, when DL's body is dragged to the farm by a horse, with a message from Stubbs telling Seth that they have Amelia and Seth must hand himself over or she'll die next.
10	"God's Body"	Adam Kane	Tony Tost	January 18, 2018	0.63
After the events of the night, the townspeople count their losses. Bessie reveals that she's figured out that this isn't the first time the Duvall family has paid strikebreakers to clear land: the Duvall family owned the oil company that paid Seth and Creeley's father to clear land in Wyoming in the 1920s, and have thus been responsible for all the tragedy in Seth and Creeley's lives. Seth decides to hand himself over to save Amelia and "stop the past from repeating itself". Connie, Creeley and the Sheriff head into town with Martha Riley and a badly wounded Preston, killing several Legion members on the way. Creeley finds the new banker dead. Seth finally meets Martin Eggers Hyde, PhD when the Legion take him to Stubbs' base at the radio station. Eggers Hyde forces Seth to denounce everything he stands for, live on air, after threatening to shoot Amelia. Amelia urges Seth not to do it, but Seth tells her that he used to be a hired thug like his brother Creeley and then goes ahead with the speech. During the speech, the townspeople, led by the Sheriff and Creeley, storm the radio station and rescue Seth and Amelia. Seth promises Creeley that he'll confess to murders he framed him for if they get out of their situation alive. The farmers arrive in town and the Sheriff arrests Melvin for kidnapping Amelia and killing DL. Amelia unknowingly reveals to Connie that she's the one who killed Connie's husband. Seth, with help from Sam Jr., encourages the townspeople to vote against Melvin Stubbs, though Stubbs ends up winning by 7 votes anyway. Creeley and Bessie prepare to leave town, but are interrupted by Tennyson Duvall and Martin Eggers Hyde, PhD. Amelia expresses regret for having encouraged DL to join the cause after his landlady delivers his manuscript to her. After releasing new Sheriff Melvin Stuff, former Sheriff Berryman murders Stubbs and his Black Legion members after they threaten to hurt Bessie, not knowing she is his daughter. Duvall, Creeley and Eggers Hyde drive to a remote location, and Duvall shoots Eggers Hyde, much to his surprise, because he has "risked the Duvall's good name" with his actions in Holden. Creeley is offered Eggers Hyde's job and he accepts. Seth takes to the airwaves again and gives an inspiring speech, encouraging people to fight back. Creeley returns to Bessie while Connie visits Amelia, who she now knows to be her husband's killer. When he gets back home after his radio speech, Seth discovers a bible covered in blood, but it is not revealed whose blood is on it.

== Reception ==
Reviews for the show were positive to mixed. Alan Sepinwall wrote: "Tost and company do a nice job illustrating all the people in the story — usually women — pushing up against barriers that go beyond economics...The men dominate the story because of the era and the type of show this is, but the women feel much more complex and original. Emily St. James wrote that at Damnation's center "is a world and time period that TV hasn't ever explored as thoroughly as it could, and it’s clear that all involved (but especially creator Tony Tost) have done their research. The same growing pains that nearly all dramas face are clear and evident, but Damnation has a setting and point of view...Slow-moving and enamored of its own darkness as Damnation is, there's something vital and real in the show's insistence that the United States' institutions have failed and are only looking out for themselves." Alexis Gunderson compared Damnation favorably to Netflix's Godless, writing that "Damnation actually followed through on its promise to interrogate the corruption of capitalism and racism and the gulf of messy morality between what is good for the individual and what is good for society." Mark Dawidziak of the Cleveland Plain Dealer wrote that the show feels like "a powerful collaboration between Nobel Prize-winning author John Steinbeck and pioneering mystery writer Dashiell Hammett...Although set during the Depression, "Damnation" is a series packing a tremendous thematic punch for 2017 viewers."

The review aggregator website Rotten Tomatoes reported a 64% approval rating, with an average rating of 6.36/10 based on 25 reviews. Users gave the show a 91% approval rating, with an average rating of 4.5/5 based on 272 reviews. The website's consensus states "'Damnation's' complex character driven mystery is intriguing, though it occasionally feels like homework."
