= Red Road (film) =

2006 film by Andrea Arnold

- Theatrical release poster
- Directed by: Andrea Arnold
- Written by: Andrea Arnold
- Produced by: Carrie Comerford
- Starring: Kate Dickie; Tony Curran; Martin Compston; Natalie Press
- Cinematography: Robbie Ryan
- Edited by: Nicolas Chaudeurge
- Production companies: UK Film Council; Scottish Screen; Glasgow Film Office; BBC Films; Zoma Films; Verve Pictures; Sigma Films; Zentropa Entertainment
- Distributed by: Verve Pictures (United Kingdom); Camera Film (Denmark)
- Release dates: 20 May 2006 (Cannes); 27 October 2006 (United Kingdom); 29 June 2007 (Denmark)
- Running time: 113 minutes
- Countries: United Kingdom; Denmark
- Language: English

Red Road is a 2006 psychological thriller film directed by Andrea Arnold and starring Kate Dickie, Tony Curran, Martin Compston, and Natalie Press. It tells the story of a CCTV security operator who observes a man from her past through her monitors. It is named after, and partly set at, the Red Road Flats in Balornock, Glasgow, Scotland, which were the tallest residential buildings in Europe at the time they were built. It was shot largely in a Dogme 95 style, using handheld cameras and natural light. The Observer polled several filmmakers and film critics who voted it as one of the best British films in the last 25 years.

Red Road was the first film in Advance Party, a proposed trilogy following a set of rules dictating how the films were to be written and directed. They were all to be filmed and set in Scotland, using the same characters and cast. Each film was to be made by a different first-time director.

== Plot ==
Jackie Morrison works in Glasgow as a CCTV operator, monitoring the Red Road Flats. She lives alone and engages in occasional sex with Avery, her married coworker.

Jackie recognises a man she sees on the CCTV monitor and begins inquiring about him. The man, Clyde Henderson, has been released early from prison for good behaviour, but will be jailed again immediately if he steps out of line. She begins stalking Clyde, tracking him on the CCTV monitors and gathering information about him. She follows Clyde to a cafe, and later learns he is throwing a party at the apartment he shares with Stevie, his former cellmate. She gains entry to the party and begins exchanging looks with a drunk Clyde. They dance, but she makes an excuse and runs out of the apartment.

After spotting Clyde on CCTV heading to a local bar, she goes there and sees him break up a fight between Stevie and another man, who Stevie's girlfriend April recognizes as Stevie's father. They return to the apartment, while Clyde initiates a conversation with Jackie before inviting her back to the apartment too. Clyde reveals he has a daughter, with whom he regrets having lost contact. Clyde and Jackie have passionate sex, but she runs from the bedroom and then fabricates evidence to frame Clyde for rape, putting semen from the condom he used inside herself, striking her face with a stone, and fleeing from the apartment block in view of the CCTV cameras. Stevie breaks into Jackie's home, telling her that Clyde has been arrested, with no hope of avoiding prison, and demands to know why she has falsely accused him. Jackie reveals that Clyde caused the death of her husband and daughter in a car accident. Jackie watches the CCTV tape and sees the police arresting Clyde at his apartment, and then, a few moments later, Clyde's estranged daughter approaching the apartment block.

Jackie relents and tells the police she wishes to withdraw the accusation of rape. After Clyde's release, Jackie confronts him and they argue: Clyde describes the road traffic accident that killed Jackie's husband and daughter, explaining that he lost control of the car. Jackie reveals that her last words to her daughter were harsh. She tells Clyde that his daughter tried to reach him on the day of his arrest, and they go their separate ways.

== Cast ==
- Kate Dickie as Jackie Morrison
- Tony Curran as Clyde Henderson
- Martin Compston as Stevie
- Natalie Press as April
- Paul Higgins as Avery

== Reception ==
=== Critical response ===
On review-aggregating website Rotten Tomatoes, the film has a score of 87% based on 90 reviews, for an average rating of 7.4/10, the critical consensus stating: "Red Road director Andrea Arnold skillfully parses out just enough plot details at a time to keep the audience engrossed in this seductive thriller". On Metacritic, the film has a score of 73 out of 100 based on 18 critics, indicating "generally favorable reviews".

A.O. Scott of the New York Times praised the film's ambiguity surrounding regarding the motivations of the main character, writing that "the queasy mixture of sympathy and curiosity that Red Road evokes is evidence of a talented, risk-taking filmmaker discovering her power".

=== Accolades ===
- Cannes Film Festival 2006 – Jury Prize
- BAFTA Film Awards 2006 – Special Achievement by a British Director, Writer or Producer in their first Feature Film
- BAFTA Scotland Awards 2006 – Best Screenplay
- BAFTA Scotland Awards 2006 – Best Actress in a Scottish Film (Kate Dickie)
- BAFTA Scotland Awards 2006 – Best Actor in a Scottish Film (Tony Curran)
- BAFTA Scotland Awards 2006 – Best Director
- BAFTA Scotland Awards 2006 – Best Film
- British Independent Film Awards 2006 – Best Actress (Dickie)
- British Independent Film Awards 2006 – Best Actor (Curran)
- London Film Festival 2006 – Sutherland Trophy awarded to "the director of the most original and imaginative first feature film"

== See also ==
- List of films featuring surveillance
