= BAFTA Scotland =

Scottish branch of the British Academy of Film and Television Arts

Bafta Scotland
- Formation: 7 December 1986
- Type: Film, television and video game organisation
- Headquarters: Glasgow
- Location: 15 Candleriggs, Glasgow, G1 1TQ
- Region served: Scotland
- Director: Jude MacLaverty
- Committee Chair: Dani Carlaw
- Parent organisation: British Academy of Film and Television Arts (BAFTA)
- Website: bafta.org/scotland

BAFTA Scotland is the Scottish branch of the British Academy of Film and Television Arts. Formed in 1986, the branch supports film, television and games talent in Scotland through year-round membership activity, awarding bursaries for new talent and holds an annual awards ceremony recognising the achievement by performers and production staff in Scottish film, television and video games. These Awards are separate from the British Academy Television Awards and British Academy Film Awards.

== British Academy Scotland Awards ==
The BAFTA Scotland Awards are presented in an annual award show hosted by BAFTA Scotland. From 2011 to 2018, the ceremony took place in the Radisson Blu Hotel in Glasgow. As of 2019, the ceremony has been hosted at the Doubletree by Hilton Glasgow Central.

== British Academy Scotland New Talent Awards ==
The British Academy Scotland New Talent Awards were held annually from 2009 - 2016. The accolades honoured the best upcoming talent in the field of film and television in Scotland. The 2016 British Academy Scotland New Talent Awards ceremony took place on 14 April 2016.
