= The Hood Trilogy =

British drama film series

- Created by: Menhaj Huda; Noel Clarke

Films and television
- Film(s): Kidulthood (2006); Adulthood (2008); Brotherhood (2016)

Audio
- Soundtrack(s): Adulthood (2008)

The Hood Trilogy is a series of British drama films. The film series began in 2006 with Kidulthood, which was followed by the sequels Adulthood and Brotherhood. The series focuses on the lives of several teenagers in the Ladbroke Grove and Latimer Road area of inner West London. The film series has earned over £7 million worldwide.

== Films ==
Crew/detail	Film		
Crew/detail	Kidulthood (2006)	Adulthood (2008)	Brotherhood (2016)
Director	Menhaj Huda	Noel Clarke	Noel Clarke
Producer(s)	Menhaj Huda; Amir Madani; George Issac; Damian Jones	Amir Madani	Noel Clarke; Jason Maza
Writer	Noel Clarke	Noel Clarke	Noel Clarke
Cinematography	Brian Tufano	Brian Tufano	Aaron Reid
Editor(s)	Victoria Boydell	Tom Hemmings	Tommy Boulding
Composer	The Angel	Chad Hobson	Tom Linden
Production companies	—	Cipher Films; Limelight	Unstoppable Entertainment
Distribution	Revolver Entertainment	Pathé Pictures International	Lionsgate (UK)
Runtime	91 minutes	99 minutes	105 minutes
Released	3 March 2006	20 June 2008	2 September 2016

=== Kidulthood ===
Kidulthood is a 2006 British drama created by Menhaj Huda. The film focuses on the majority of the characters in the film who generally behave in a violent and lawless manner. They are portrayed as being reckless and antisocial young people who commit crimes such as petty theft and serious violence. The film also showcases how the characters engage in recreational drug taking and some sexual behaviour. It was released on 3 March 2006.

=== Adulthood ===
Adulthood is a 2008 British drama directed by Noel Clarke. The film focuses on Sam the protagonist and his experiences after he is released from jail. Six years after being imprisoned for killing Trife, it's revealed he has undergone dramatic changes and is not the same person who went inside. It was released on 20 June 2008.

=== Brotherhood ===
Brotherhood is a 2016 British drama directed by Noel Clarke. The film focuses on Sam squaring up to a new world: he realises it comes with new problems, and new challenges that he must face up to. He knows it will require old friends to help him survive new dangers. It was released on 29 August 2016.
