= Brian Tufano =

British cinematographer (1939–2023)

Brian Tufano BSC
- Born: 1 December 1939; Shepherd's Bush, London, England
- Died: 12 January 2023 (aged 83)
- Years active: 1963–2011
- Organisation: British Society of Cinematographers

Brian Richard Tufano BSC (1 December 1939 – 12 January 2023) was an English cinematographer.

Tufano was admitted to the British Society of Cinematographers and won the 2001 BAFTA Award for Outstanding Contribution to Film and Television.

== Life and career ==
Tufano began his career at the BBC as a projectionist, working his way up to become a cameraman with the BBC film department in 1963. During his time at the BBC, Tufano worked with directors including Stephen Frears and Alan Parker. In 1992 he was assigned to the series Mr. Wroe's Virgins and worked with director Danny Boyle.

Tufano went freelance in the mid-1970s – his first feature was the 1978 film The Sailor's Return with director Jack Gold.

During the 1980s, Tufano spent time working in the United States, including additional cinematography for Jordan Cronenweth on Blade Runner.

Boyle worked with Tufano on his feature debut, Shallow Grave, and continued to work with Tufano on the 1996 films Trainspotting and the 1997 film A Life Less Ordinary. Boyle and Tufano also worked together on the 2008 short film Alien Love Triangle.

Tufano worked with director Menhaj Huda on his first feature film, Jump Boy, in 1999, and they went on to work together on the 2006 feature film Kidulthood. Tufano also shot the 2008 sequel Adulthood, which was directed by Noel Clarke. Huda and Tufano worked together on the 2011 feature, Everywhere and Nowhere.

From 2003 to 2016, Tufano was Head of Cinematography at the National Film and Television School in Beaconsfield. Before his death, he was a Teaching Fellow at the school.

Tufano died on 12 January 2023, at the age of 83.

== Filmography ==
=== Film ===
Year	Title	Director	Notes
1968	The Big Switch	Pete Walker	
1978	The Sailor's Return	Jack Gold	
1979	Quadrophenia	Franc Roddam	
1981	Riding High	Ross Cramer	
1983	The Lords of Discipline	Franc Roddam	
1984	Dreamscape	Joseph Ruben	
1988	War Party	Franc Roddam	
1989	Windprints	David Wicht	
1994	Shallow Grave	Danny Boyle	
1996	Trainspotting	Danny Boyle	
1996	True Blue	Ferdinand Fairfax	
1997	The Life of Stuff	Simon Donald	
1997	A Life Less Ordinary	Danny Boyle	
1998	What Rats Won't Do	Alastair Reid	
1999	East is East	Damien O'Donnell	
1999	Virtual Sexuality	Nick Hurran	
1999	Women Talking Dirty	Coky Giedroyc	
2000	Billy Elliot	Stephen Daldry	
2001	Late Night Shopping	Saul Metzstein	
2001	Last Orders	Fred Schepisi	
2002	Once Upon a Time in the Midlands	Shane Meadows	
2006	Kidulthood	Menhaj Huda	
2007	I Could Never Be Your Woman	Amy Heckerling	
2008	Adulthood	Menhaj Huda	
2010	Sex & Drugs & Rock & Roll	Mat Whitecross	With Christopher Ross
2011	Everywhere and Nowhere	Menhaj Huda	

Short film

Year	Title	Director	Notes
2008	Alien Love Triangle	Danny Boyle	

=== Television ===
TV movies

Year	Title	Director	Notes
1966	A Few Castles in Spain	Kevin Billington	Documentary film
1966	Isadora Duncan, the Biggest Dancer in the World	Ken Russell	With Dick Bush
1975	The Evacuees	Alan Parker	
1975	Daft As a Brush	Stephen Frears	
1975	Moll Flanders	Donald McWhinnie	
1975	Three Men in a Boat	Stephen Frears	
1982	Murder Is Easy	Claude Whatham	
1982	The Wall	Robert Markowitz	
1986	Trapped in Silence	Michael Tuchner	
1996	Element of Doubt	Christopher Morahan	
2008	My Zinc Bed	Anthony Page	

TV series

Year	Title	Director	Notes
1969	Out of the Unknown	Peter Cregeen	Episode "Get Off My Cloud"
1969	Take Three Girls	John Matthews	Episode "Avril: Devon Violets"
1970	Thirty-Minute Theatre	Michael Tuchner	Episode "All My Own Army"
1972	The Sextet	Alan Bridges	Episode "Follow the Yellow Brick Road"
1974	Play of the Month	James MacTaggart	Episode "Robinson Crusoe"
1976	BBC2 Playhouse	Stephen Frears	Episode "Play Things"
1977	Centre Play	Himself	Episode "Rehearsal"
1977-1978	BBC2 Play of the Week	Clive Rees; Clive Donner	Segments "Arnhem: The Story of an Escape" and "She Fell Among Thieves"
1982	Five-Minute Films	Mike Leigh	5 episodes
1994	Common As Muck	Metin Hüseyin	3 episodes
1996	Silent Witness	Harry Hook; Mike Barker; Noella Smith	6 episodes

Miniseries

Year	Title	Director	Notes
1971	The Search for the Nile	Fred Burnley	With John Baker
1973	Wessex Tales	Gavin Millar	Episode "An Imaginative Woman"
1974	Dial M for Murder	Gerald Blake	Episode "The Vineyard"
1976	The Glittering Prizes	Waris Hussein	Episode An Early Life
1977	Supernatural	Alan Cooke	Episode "Mr Nightingale"
1989	The Endless Game	Bryan Forbes	
1993	Mr. Wroe's Virgins	Danny Boyle	
1994	Middlemarch	Anthony Page	
1995	The Choir	Ferdinand Fairfax	

== Awards and nominations ==
For his work on Late Night Shopping, Tufano was nominated for the Technical Achievement Award at the Evening Standard British Film Awards.

Tufano won the Special Jury Prize at the 2002 British Independent Film Awards. Tufano received the BSC ARRI John Alcott Memorial Award in 2015, and went on to receive the British Society of Cinematographers Lifetime Achievement Award in 2020.

BAFTA Awards

Year	Title	Category	Result	Ref.
1995	Middlemarch	Television: Best Photography and Lighting (Fiction/Entertainment)	Nominated	
2001	Billy Elliot	Film: Best Cinematography	Nominated	
2001	n/a	Television Craft: Special Award	Won	
