= Arnold Oceng =

Ugandan-born British actor (born 1985)

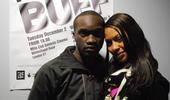
- Born: Arnold Oceng; 30 November 1985 (age 40); Uganda
- Other name: Snakeyman
- Years active: 1999–present
- Awards: National Film Awards, 2017

Arnold Oceng, sometimes known as Snakeyman, (born 30 November 1985), is a Ugandan-born British actor and singer. Oceng is best known for the roles in Grange Hill, Adulthood and Brotherhood.

== Early life ==
He was born on 30 November 1985 to a South Sudanese father and a Ugandan mother. In 1986 when he was one year of age, his family moved to Brixton, South London as refugees.

== Career ==
He started acting at the age of 6 as a child artist. In school, he played as 'King Herod' in the play at the Corpus Christi Roman Catholic primary school on Brixton Hill.

In 1999, he made his acting debut as a child artist with the role 'Calvin Braithwaite' in the 73 episodes of BBC children's television drama serial Grange Hill. The series was highly popular and Oceng continued in the show until 2004. Since then he acted in minor supportive roles in many television serials including, Casualty, The Bill and Sold. Oceng made his maiden cinema appearance in 2008 film Adulthood. He later followed with supportive roles in independent UK films, 4.3.2.1. and My Brother The Devil.

In 2014, he acted alongside Reese Witherspoon in the film The Good Lie, which became his first Hollywood role. In 2016, he made the role 'Charles' in the film A United Kingdom which had its premier in BFI London Film Festival. Then he starred in the Danish biopic The Greatest Man screened in 2016. In the same year, he joined the cast of film Brotherhood. In 2017, he was nominated for the Male Performance in Film award at Screen Nation Film and Television Awards which was held at the Park Plaza London Riverbank hotel on 7 May 2017. In the same year, he won the award for the Best Supporting Actor at National Film Awards UK for his role in Brotherhood.

== Filmography ==
Key
†	Denotes projects that have not yet been released

=== Film ===
Year	Title	Role	Notes
2007	The Prodigals	Marlon	Short film
2008	Adulthood	Henry	
2008	One of Those Days	Angel Steward #4	Short film
2009	Dog Endz	Quinton	TV film
2010	4.3.2.1.	Dark Chocolate	
2011	The Tapes	Nathan	
2011	Victim	Jayden	
2011	Demons Never Die	Curtis	
2011	Point Blank		TV film
2012	My Brother the Devil	Aj	
2012	Payback Season	Maxy	
2012	The Knot	Fulishio Akinkugbe	
2013	Circle of Revenge	Lil Reese	
2013	It's a Lot	Aasif	
2014	The Good Lie	Mamere	
2016	Brotherhood	Henry Okocha	
2016	A United Kingdom	Charles	
2017	Breathe	Arnold	Short film
2017	Pound for Pound	Ayub Kalule	
TBC	Finding Forever†	Marvin	Pre-production

=== Television ===
Year	Title	Role	Notes
1999–2004	Grange Hill	Calvin Braithwaite	Series regular; 73 episodes
2006	Casualty	Solomon 'Sol' Lakah	Recurring role; 5 episodes
2007	The Bill	Wayne Tindle	Episode: "The Good Old Days"
2007	Sold	Josh	Series 1, Episode 3
2011	Top Boy	Femi	Series 1, Episode 1
2017	This World	Joseph	Episode: "The Attack: Terror in the UK"
2018	Age Before Beauty	Leon	Recurring role; 4 episodes
2019	Dark Money	Ryan Osei	Miniseries; 4 episodes
2022	The Underground	Jaidai	Miniseries
2025	MobLand	Olie Donker	Recurring role; 8 episodes

== Awards and nominations ==
Year	Award	Category	Work	Result
2015	National Film Awards	Best Newcomer	The Good Lie	Nominated
2017	National Film Awards	Best Breakthrough Performance in a Film	Brotherhood	Nominated
2017	National Film Awards	Best Supporting Actor	Brotherhood	Won
2017	Screen Nation Film and Television Awards	Male Performance in Film	Brotherhood	Nominated

== See also ==
- British Urban Film Festival
- List of African films of 2014
