= Sophie Stuckey =

English actress (born 1991)

- Born: Sophie Louise Stuckey; 1 March 1991 (age 35); Camden, London, England
- Occupation: Former actress
- Years active: 2002–2013

Sophie Louise Stuckey(born 1 March 1991) is an English former actress.

== Biography and career ==
Stuckey was born in London, in the borough of Camden. Her first role as an actress was in 2002, at the age of 11, in the film Close Your Eyes, while the following year she was in I Capture the Castle, film adaptation of Dodie Smith's book of the same name. Afterwards, she was in The Dark in 2005 and in My Life in Ruins (aka Driving Aphrodite) in 2009.

Meanwhile, in 2004 she debuted on TV in the BBC film Who Cares?, written and directed by Ray Harrison Graham and produced by RedBird Productions; in 2006 she appeared in one episode of the ninth season of Midsomer Murders, playing Dora Southerly, a girl who finds the body of a man in an old sawmill.

In 2010, she got the role of Summer Farley, leading of the TV series Summer in Transylvania, which pushed her to quit her studies in Global Politics and International Relations at Birkbeck, University of London, and took part in The Woman in Black with Daniel Radcliffe, coming out in 2012: in the film she was Stella Kipps, late wife of the leading, who appeared only in flashbacks or as a ghost. The next year she joined the cast of the two-part miniseries The Reckoning, in which she played the part of cancer-stricken fifteen-year-old Amanda Wilson.

In 2012 she took part, as Jemma, in Menhaj Huda's horror film Comedown, which was screened as world premiere on 4 October 2012 at Grimmfest. In January 2013 she was in two episodes of the sixteenth season of the TV series Silent Witness, playing Karen Masters, while in April she was in Endeavour. In September she portrayed Eva Harper in the fourth episode of the third season of Vera.

== Filmography ==
=== Film ===
Year	Title	Role	Notes
2002	Close Your Eyes	Heather	aka Doctor Sleep
2003	I Capture the Castle	Cassandra (aged 7)	
2004	Gyppo	Rosa	Short film
2005	The Dark	Sarah	
2009	My Life in Ruins	Caitlin	
2012	The Woman in Black	Stella Kipps	
2012	Comedown	Jemma	

=== Television ===
Year	Title	Role	Notes
2004	Who Cares?	Trixy	TV film
2006	Midsomer Murders	Dora Southerly	Episode: "Country Matters"
2010	Summer in Transylvania	Summer Farley	Main role (20 episodes)
2011	The Reckoning	Amanda Wilson	
2013	Silent Witness	Karen Masters	Episodes: "True Love Waits, Part One" and "True Love Waits, Part 2"
2013	Endeavour	Pamela Walters	Episode: "Girl"
2013	Vera	Eva Harper	Episode: "Prodigal Son"
