= Everywhere and Nowhere =

- Film poster
- Directed by: Menhaj Huda
- Screenplay by: Gurpreet Kaur Bhatti
- Story by: Menhaj Huda
- Produced by: Sam Tromans; Mark Blythe
- Starring: James Floyd; Adam Deacon
- Cinematography: Brian Tufano
- Edited by: Stuart Gazzard
- Music by: Nerm
- Production company: Arena Productions
- Distributed by: Mara Pictures
- Release date: 6 May 2011
- Running time: 96 minutes
- Country: United Kingdom
- Language: English

Everywhere and Nowhere is a 2011 coming of age British drama film focusing on the identity struggles of Ash (James Floyd), a young British Pakistani who is torn between the traditions of middle-class family life and his passion for his work as a disc jockey. The film comes from Kidulthood director Menhaj Huda.

== Synopsis ==
Young and educated, Ash leads a privileged life but finds himself between two cultures: hedonistic, multi-cultural London with his friends and a traditional Pakistani family upbringing in the middle class suburbs. Tormented by the idea of entering the family business, Ash rebels and finds identity through blending classic Bollywood soundtracks with contemporary electronic music.

== Cast ==
- James Floyd as Ash Khan
- Adam Deacon as Zaf
- Shivani Ghai as Sairah Khan
- Neet Mohan as Riz
- Elyes Gabel as Jaz
- Katia Winter as Bella
- Shaheen Khan as Rubena Khan
- Simon Webbe as Ronnie
- James Buckley as Jamie
- Art Malik as Uncle Mirza
- Saeed Jaffrey as Zaf's Dad
- Ronny Jhutti as Salim
- Amber Rose Revah as Yasmin

== Reception ==
The film received largely negative reviews from critics, with only 1 from 12 critics giving it a positive write-up on the review aggregator Rotten Tomatoes.

However James Floyd got significant critical praise for his lead performance, including Screen International, The Guardian and Time Out.
