= Damian Jones (producer) =

British film producer (born 1964)

- Born: 30 September 1964 (age 62); London, England
- Years active: 1989 – present

Damian Jones (born 30 September 1964) is a British independent film producer.

His career spans more than 40 feature films that include collaborating with top directing and acting talent to critical and commercial success.

He is the founder of DJ Films Ltd. and was co-founder of Dragon Pictures and Mission Pictures.

== Filmography ==
Year	Film	Notes
1989	The Candy Show	
1991	Rubin & Ed	Associate Producer
1995	Dead Weekend	Executive Producer
1997	Gridlock'd	
1997	Welcome to Sarajevo	
1999	Splendor	
1999	The Debt Collector	
1999	A Texas Funeral	
2000	Some Voices	
2000	Dancing at the Blue Iguana	
2001	Very Annie Mary	
2002	Thunderpants	
2004	Millions	
2004	Piccadilly Jim	Executive Producer
2006	Kidulthood	
2006	Alpha Male	
2006	The History Boys	
2007	Straightheads	
2008	Adulthood	
2008	Northern Star	Executive Producer
2010	Sex & Drugs & Rock & Roll	
2011	The Iron Lady	
2012	Fast Girls	
2013	Belle	
2013	Powder Room	
2015	The Lady in the Van	
2016	Dad's Army	
2016	Absolutely Fabulous: The Movie	
2016	Brotherhood	Executive Producer
2016	A Street Cat Named Bob	
2016	The Receptionist	Executive Producer
2017	Goodbye Christopher Robin	
2019	Greed	
2019	Blue Story	
2020	Amulet	Executive Producer
2020	Monday	
2021	Boxing Day	
2022	Allelujah	
2022	Brian and Charles	Executive Producer
2022	The Nan Movie	
2022	See How They Run	
2022	I Used to Be Famous	Executive Producer
2023	Rye Lane	
2023	T.I.M	Executive Producer
2023	Seize Them	
2023	Greatest Days	Executive Producer
