= Comedown (film) =

2012 film directed by Menhaj Huda

- Directed by: Menhaj Huda
- Written by: Steven Kendall
- Produced by: Dominic Norris; Gareth Wiley
- Starring: Jacob Anderson; Adam Deacon; Sophie Stuckey; Geoff Bell; Jessica Barden; Calum McNab
- Music by: Theo Green
- Production companies: Serotonin Films; Phoenix Wiley
- Distributed by: StudioCanal
- Release date: 4 October 2012 (United Kingdom)
- Running time: 90 minutes
- Country: United Kingdom
- Language: English
- Budget: $2 million

Comedown is a 2012 British urban horror film directed by Menhaj Huda, and written by Steven Kendall. Dubbed "Kidulthood meets Saw", the film stars Jacob Anderson, Adam Deacon and Geoff Bell in the lead roles.

== Plot ==
In an abandoned tower, six friends turn the tower into a radio station and soon learn they are not alone as a resident psychopath begins hunting them down.

== Cast ==
- Jacob Anderson as Lloyd
- Adam Deacon as Jason
- Sophie Stuckey as Jemma
- Calum McNab as Gary "Gal"
- Jessica Barden as Kelly
- Duane Henry as Colin "Col"
- Geoff Bell as Ray Grady
- Shazad "Shizzio" Khan as Shafiq "Shaf"
- Muazzin "Naga" Aziz as Nazar "Naz"
- Gemma-Leah Devereux as Nurse Samantha Harris
- Slaine Kelly as Nurse Sally Mitchell
- Christos Lawton as PC Jon Murray
- Deirdre Mullins as Alissa the Newsreader
- Stephen Taylor as the Creeper

== Production ==
Comedown was shot on a budget of $2,000,000, and was filmed in a suburb of London close to the O2 Arena.

== Reception ==
=== Critical response ===
Stephen Dalton of The National wrote in his review: " A good slasher film is not about originality or realism, of course, but about execution – no pun intended. As such, director Menhaj Huda does a decent job with limited ingredients. But there is nothing in this pulpy, formulaic nerve-jangler that horror fans will not have seen countless times before."

=== Release ===
Comedown premiered on 4 October 2012, at film festival Grimmfest, but was not released to cinemas on general release, and instead was expected to be released direct-to-DVD on 11 March 2013.
