= David Ajala =

British actor (born 1986)

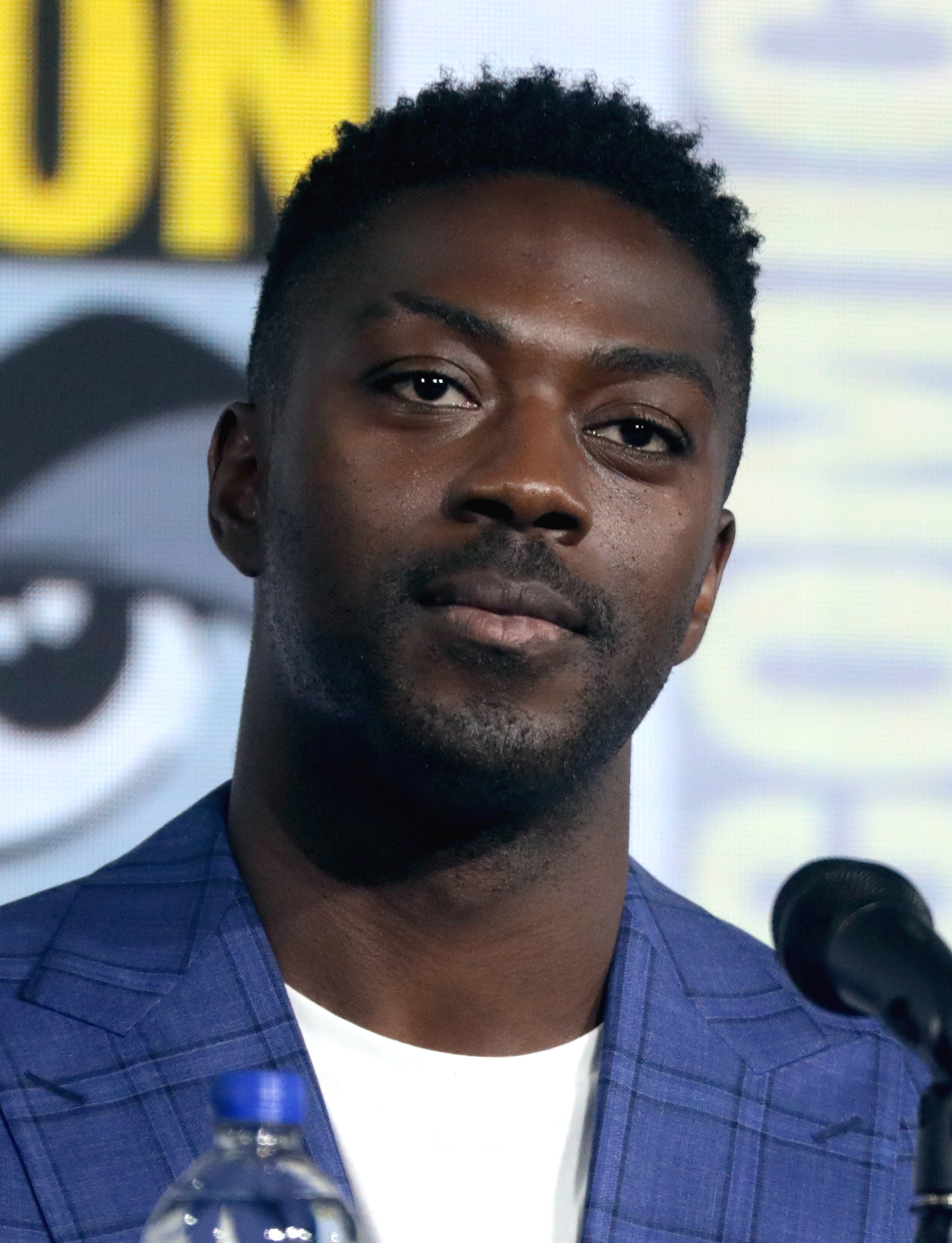
- David Ajala at San Diego Comic-Con 2019
- Born: 21 May 1986 (age 40); Hackney, London, England
- Education: Court Theatre Training Company (BA)
- Occupation: Actor
- Years active: 2006–present
- Spouse: Terri Martin
- Children: 2

David Ajala (born 21 May 1986) is an English actor. On television, he is known for his roles in the CW series Supergirl (2018–2019), the Syfy series Nightflyers (2018), the CBS and Paramount+ series Star Trek: Discovery (2020–2024), and the NBC series Law & Order (2025–). His films include Starred Up (2013), Brotherhood (2016) and Italian Studies (2021).

== Early life ==
Ajala was born on 21 May 1986 in Hackney, London. He is of Nigerian Yoruba origin. In an interview for Interview Magazine Ajala said: "When I went to secondary school, my maths teacher said I had way too much energy and was too mischievous. He tried to convince me that if I did acting, I'd be popular with the girls". Ajala joined an afterschool programme at the Anna Scher Theatre. He went on to graduate with a Bachelor of Arts (BA) in Acting from the Court Theatre Training Company, awarded by Buckinghamshire New University.

== Career ==
On stage, Ajala has performed in Nation, A Midsummer Night's Dream with the Royal Shakespeare Company, Hamlet, and as Jim Brown in the European premiere of One Night in Miami by Kemp Powers.

In film, his first part was in Kidulthood, and he also appears in the sequels, Adulthood and Brotherhood; he has also appeared in The Dark Knight and in major roles in Starred Up and the 2016 Seekers. On television, he has appeared in many series including Doctor Who and in major roles in Black Box, Beowulf: Return to the Shieldlands, Nightflyers, and Falling Water.

Sean 'Mac' McAlister, a character from 2017 video game Need for Speed Payback, is voiced by and modeled after him.

Ajala has appeared as Keith in the BBC Radio 4 dramas Burned To Nothing (2011) and Felix in The Price of Oil: Someone's Making A Killing In Nigeria both by Rex Obano.

In 2018 and 2019, Ajala played Manchester Black in seven episodes of the fourth season of the CW series Supergirl.

From 2020 to 2024, Ajala had a main role as Cleveland "Book" Booker in the third through fifth seasons of Star Trek: Discovery. The series was released on CBS All Access and then on Paramount+.

In September 2025, it was announced Ajala had joined the cast of the long-running NBC series Law & Order for its 25th season. He made his debut as Detective Theo Walker in the November 2025 episode "Guardian".

== Personal life ==
Ajala is married to presenter and travel agent Terri Martin. They have two sons.

== Filmography ==
=== Film ===
Year	Title	Role	Notes
2006	Kidulthood	Desmond	Uncredited
2008	Adulthood	Desmond	
2008	The Dark Knight	Bounty Hunter #2	
2009	Hamlet	Reynaldo / Dumbshow Poisoner	
2010	Winter Sun	Guy	Short
2010	Following Footsteps	Christopher Knight	
2011	One Day	Floor Manager	
2011	Spirit	Terror	Short
2012	Payback Season	Baron	
2012	Illegal Activity	Edward	Short
2012	Offender	Kelvin	
2012	Sentenced Served	Marvin	Short
2013	Fast & Furious 6	Ivory	
2013	Starred Up	Tyrone	
2013	Breakthrough	Henry	Short
2014	Queen of Diamonds	Bench Guy	Short
2014	Emulsion	Jeff	
2015	Jupiter Ascending	Ibis	
2015	He Works the Long Nights		Short
2015	Spirit	Terror	Short
2016	Seekers	Amadu	Short
2016	Kill Command	Drifter	
2016	Brotherhood	Detective Desmond 'BUDS' Lynch	
2017	The Art of Love	Anthony	Short
2017	Support	Chris	Short
2017	Without Disguise	Leo	Short
2021	Italian Studies	Ade	
2023	Daylight Rules	Frank	Short
2025	The Woman in Cabin 10	Ben	

=== Television ===
Year	Title	Role	Notes
2007	Dream Team	Sean Campbell	18 episodes
2008	The Revenge Files of Alistair Fury	Steve	Episode: "Technology Bytes"
2008	The Bill	Lenny Jones	Episode: "Beth Undercover"
2008	Trexx and Flipside	Flipside	6 episodes
2009	Hamlet	Reynaldo / Dumbshow Poisoner	TV film
2010	Doctor Who	Peter	Episode: "The Beast Below"
2011	Silent Witness	Mark Blakefield	2 episodes
2011	Coming Up	Malachi	Episode: "Micah"
2011	Misfits	Private Investigator	Episode #3.6
2012	Monroe	Max Portas	Episode #2.4
2013	Death in Paradise	Louis Nelson	Episode: "Murder on the Plantation"
2013	Black Mirror	Jeff Carter	Episode: "The Waldo Moment"
2013	Law & Order: UK	Gavin Dale	2 episodes
2014	Black Box	Will Van Renseller	13 episodes
2016	Beowulf: Return to the Shieldlands	Rate	6 episodes
2016	Hooten & the Lady	Dawit	Episode: "Ethiopia"
2016	The Break	Xavier	Episode: "System Cycle"
2016–2018	Falling Water	Burton	20 episodes
2018	Nightflyers	Roy Eris	10 episodes
2018–2019	Supergirl	Manchester Black	Recurring role
2019	Urban Myths	The Burglar	Episode: "Grace Under Pressure"
2020–2024	Star Trek: Discovery	Cleveland "Book" Booker	Main role (seasons 3–5)
2020–2024	The Ready Room	Himself	4 episodes
2024	The Jetty	Casey	4 episodes
2025	Nine Bodies in a Mexican Morgue	Zack Ellis	Main role
2025–present	Law & Order	Detective Theo Walker	Main role (season 25–present)

=== Video games ===
Year	Title	Role
2017	Mass Effect: Andromeda	Additional voices
2017	Need for Speed: Payback	Sean 'Mac' McAlister

== Theatre credits ==
Year	Title	Role	Venue
2006	You Are Right If You Say So	Lamberto Laudisi	Courtyard Theatre, London
2006	How to Steal a Diamond	YM	Traverse Theatre, Edinburgh
2007	The Swing of Things	Claude Kabinda	Stephen Joseph Theatre, Scarborough
2008	A Midsummer Night's Dream	Lysander (Understudy)	Courtyard Theatre, Stratford-upon-Avon
2008	Love's Labour's Lost	Lord Dumaine (Understudy)	Courtyard Theatre, Stratford-upon-Avon
2009	Death and the King's Horseman	HRH The Prince	Royal National Theatre, London
2009	Nation	Milo	Royal National Theatre, London
2010	Ruined	Fortune	Almeida Theatre, London
2012	The Witness	Simon	Royal Court Theatre, London
2016	One Night in Miami	Jim Brown	Donmar Warehouse, London
