= The Anomaly (film) =

- Theatrical release poster
- Directed by: Noel Clarke
- Written by: Simon Lewis
- Produced by: James Harris; Mark Lane; Noel Clarke
- Starring: Noel Clarke; Ian Somerhalder; Brian Cox; Alexis Knapp
- Cinematography: David Katznelson
- Edited by: Tommy Boulding
- Music by: Tom Linden
- Production companies: Unstoppable Entertainment; Tea Shop Productions
- Distributed by: Universal Pictures
- Release dates: 19 June 2014 (EIFF); 4 July 2014 (United Kingdom)
- Running time: 97 minutes
- Country: United Kingdom
- Language: English
- Box office: £11.6 million

The Anomaly is a 2014 British science fiction action film co-produced and directed by Noel Clarke, who also starred in the lead role. The film co-stars Ian Somerhalder and Luke Hemsworth. The film was panned by critics. This is Somerhalder's final acting film before his retirement in 2024.

== Plot ==
Ex-soldier Ryan Reeve wakes up in the back of a moving van next to a young tied-up boy, Alex, who is being held prisoner. Strangely, the boy seems to think Reeve is the kidnapper though he has no memory of ever having seen the boy before, and looking at his watch, he last remembered it being six months previously. After freeing the boy, making a run for it, and attempting to figure out what has happened to him, all he remembers is being at a facility treating his severe PTSD. As one of their pursuers catches up to them, suddenly he blacks out again and awakes in a room with a mysterious young man (same as before) named Harkin Langham, who seems to think he is someone else.

When Langham discovers who he really is, he disables Reeve and knocks him out. Reeve then wakes up in a mysterious bedroom having sex with a beautiful young woman. She identifies herself as a prostitute named Dana, who seems to remember meeting and engaging in sexual activity with a much more violent and sociopathic version of Reeve. He tries to explain his predicament, but she remains skeptical. He asks her to come with him, but she says she cannot leave as she is the "property" of a Russian gangster named Sergio. Reeve offers to free her if she will help him solve the mystery that his life has become. The two manage to escape, but Reeve again loses consciousness when the mind control system reboots and again Langham catches up to him.

He must work out what is happening in bursts of exactly nine minutes and forty-seven seconds, as the control and conscious awareness of his body are repeatedly being hijacked and shuffled through different scenarios by person/s unknown. He teams up with Dana as he battles a conspiracy in mind control known as "Anomaly" led by Langham. Langham, meanwhile, urges him to stop fighting it, as it has nothing to do with him, however, he is convinced otherwise.

== Cast ==
- Noel Clarke as Pvt. Ryan Reeve/Anomaly #66
- Alexis Knapp as Dana
- Brian Cox as Dr. Francis Langham
- Ian Somerhalder as Agent Harkin Langham/Anomaly #X
- Rachael Jowett as Margaret
- Luke Hemsworth as Agent Richard Elkin/Anomaly #13
- Ali Cook as Agent Travis/Anomaly #97
- Art Parkinson as Alex
- John Schwab as Harrison Samuel
- Michael Bisping as Sergio

== Production ==
The film was produced in the United Kingdom in 2013. Clarke performed his own stunts, modifying his diet and receiving fight training for the purpose.

== Distribution ==
The first official trailer was released on 19 April 2014. The film was shown at the Edinburgh International Film Festival in June 2014 and entered general release in the UK and the Republic of Ireland through Universal Pictures on 4 July.

== Reception ==
The film was unanimously panned by critics, with a Rotten Tomatoes approval rating of 0% based on 17 reviews, making it the worst reviewed British film of 2014. On Metacritic, it has a score of 27 out of 100 from seven critics, indicating "generally unfavorable reviews". Mark Kermode of The Observer called it "ambitious but uneven". Other critics described it as "hilariously naff science-fiction mularkey" and "a peculiar Brit flick best described as a noble failure" and referred to "tangled conception and tortuously opaque execution" and to "meag[re] rewards for those willing to endure its laborious convolutions".
