= Sex & Drugs & Rock & Roll (film) =

- Theatrical release poster
- Directed by: Mat Whitecross
- Written by: Paul Viragh
- Produced by: Damian Jones
- Starring: Andy Serkis; Naomie Harris; Ray Winstone; Olivia Williams; Noel Clarke; Toby Jones; Mackenzie Crook; Bill Milner
- Cinematography: Christopher Ross; Brian Tufano
- Music by: Chaz Jankel
- Production company: DJ Films
- Distributed by: Entertainment Film Distributors
- Release date: 8 January 2010
- Running time: 113 minutes
- Country: United Kingdom
- Language: English
- Budget: £2 million
- Box office: $1 million

Sex & Drugs & Rock & Roll is a 2010 biographical film based on English new wave musician Ian Dury, starring Andy Serkis as Dury. The film follows Dury's rise to fame and documents his personal battle with the disability caused by having contracted polio during childhood. The effects that his disability and his lifestyle have upon his relationships is also a focal point of the film. The title of the film is derived from Dury's 1977 7" single, "Sex & Drugs & Rock & Roll".

Principal photography began on 29 April 2009 in Egham, Surrey and theatre footage was shot 1–3 June at Watford Palace Theatre.

== Cast ==
- Andy Serkis as Ian Dury
- Naomie Harris as Denise
- Ray Winstone as Bill Dury
- Olivia Williams as Betty Dury
- Noel Clarke as Desmond
- Toby Jones as Hargreaves
- Ralph Ineson as The Sulphate Strangler
- Mackenzie Crook as Russell Hardy
- Bill Milner as Baxter Dury
- Michael Maloney as Graham
- Arthur Darvill as Mick Gallagher
- Luke Evans as Clive Richards
- James Jagger as John Turnbull
- Tom Hughes as Chaz Jankel
- Clifford Samuel as Charley Charles
- Charlotte Beaumont as Jemima Dury
- Jennifer Carswell as Ruby
- Stephanie Carswell as Mia
- Aidan Knight as Ginger Spanish Nicky
- Joseph Kennedy as Davey Payne
- Eku Edewor as a party girl
- Catherine Balavage as Crazy drug girl (uncredited)

== Reception ==
On Rotten Tomatoes the film has an approval rating of 73% based on reviews from 51 critics. The site's critical consensus state: "Sex & Drugs & Rock & Roll pays appropriately uninhibited tribute to a pioneering artist -- and proves Andy Serkis can be every bit as compelling in a non-motion-capture role." On Metacritic it has a score of 57% based on reviews from 6 critics, indicating "mixed or average reviews".

== Awards ==
Award	Category	Nominee	Result
British Independent Film Awards	Best Actor	Andy Serkis	Nominated
British Academy Film Award	Best Actor	Andy Serkis	Nominated
British Academy Film Award	Music	Chaz Jankel	Nominated
Evening Standard Film Awards	Best Actor	Andy Serkis	Won
