= Adulthood (2008 film) =

2008 film directed by Noel Clarke

- Theatrical release poster
- Directed by: Noel Clarke
- Written by: Noel Clarke
- Produced by: Amir Madani
- Starring: Noel Clarke; Scarlett Alice Johnson; Adam Deacon; Jacob Anderson; Femi Oyeniran; Red Madrell; Ben Drew; Nathan Constance; Danny Dyer
- Cinematography: Brian Tufano
- Edited by: Tom Hemmings
- Music by: Chad Hobson
- Production companies: Cipher Films; Limelight; Unstoppable Entertainment
- Distributed by: Pathé
- Release date: 20 June 2008
- Running time: 95 minutes
- Country: United Kingdom
- Language: English
- Box office: $6.6 million

Adulthood (stylised as AdULTHOOD) is a 2008 British teen crime drama film starring, written and directed by Noel Clarke in his feature film directorial debut. The second installment in the Hood Trilogy, it is a sequel to 2006's Kidulthood. The film also co-stars Adam Deacon, Scarlett Alice Johnson, Femi Oyeniran, Red Madrell, Jacob Anderson, Ben Drew, Nathan Constance, Cornell John, and Danny Dyer. In the film, Sam (Clarke) tries to change his life following a 6-year prison sentence for killing Trife but a new gang led by Jay (Deacon) intend to avenge Trife by killing Sam.

Plans for a sequel came around following the success of Kidulthood. Menhaj Huda, who directed the first film, turned down the opportunity to direct Adulthood, which prompted the studio to hire Clarke, in his directorial debut, to helm the film. Production began in November 2007 in West London.

Adulthood had its world premiere at Leicester Square on 17 June 2008 and was released three days later. The film received generally positive reviews and was a box office success, grossing £1.2 million during its UK opening weekend, with an overall gross of £6 million, becoming the second-highest grossing British film of 2008.

At the 62nd British Academy Film Awards in 2009, Clarke won the BAFTA Rising Star Award, making him the first black person to accept the award. After starring in the film, Adam Deacon decided to write and star in his own urban film, Anuvahood. The final film of the trilogy, Brotherhood, also by Clarke, was released in 2016.

== Plot ==
Six years after being jailed for killing Trevor "Trife" Hector, (Note: As depicted in Kidulthood (2006)) Sam Peel was released from prison. During the course of the film, it is revealed that Sam, haunted by his crime, has changed dramatically and has learnt from his mistakes. While visiting Trife's grave at Oak Park cemetery, Sam gets attacked by Trife's cousin, Jehvon, who is seeking revenge on Sam for killing Trife. Sam is later able to gain control of the fight and beats him into submission. Jehvon informs him that he will not survive the day, as many people want him dead – and will stop at nothing, not even harming his family.

Sam, troubled by these claims, goes to his house and breaks in. No one is home, so Sam bandages up his wound. He then has a flashback to his prison days which reveals he helped a high ranking prison mate escape an attack from Trife's uncle, Curtis. Sam then goes into a room, goes through the drawers and picks up a gun which he discards, then leaves. As Sam later visits Claire and asks for information regarding his mother, he says he won't hurt her, but Claire says she has not seen his mother in over a year, and also tells him that Moony is at university. Then Claire's boyfriend Hayden arrives, and attacks Sam when he realises who he is, berating him for all the emotional damage he caused Claire six years ago.

Sam then visits Moony and asks for information regarding anyone who might hurt his family. He says he has changed, however Moony reveals that he should be wary of Jay as he has changed for the worse. He also tells him that Sam inspired him to study law, so he can make sure people like him do not go free in 6 years. Sam then speaks to Becky's cousin Lexi, hoping that she might have some information.

The scene then shifts to Omen, with Dabs and Henry robbing a car in broad daylight. They take what they have stolen to Ike's house to sell and are given money by Ike, who leaves to sort out some business. It is revealed that his partner is Andreas, whose face was cut in the first film by Trife. Ike and Andreas concur that he got what he deserved, as he tested Curtis's patience and suffered the consequences. Ike burns his customer's arm and beats him up to teach him a lesson for making money behind his back on his gear.

Jay is later seen selling drugs to customers. When a rich man tests him, Jay robs him and his fiancée and humiliates him. He receives a call from Jehvon informing him that Sam is out, so he releases the couple. He seeks help from Ike, who gives him a gun. Then Andreas suggests hiring some of the teenagers to kill Sam. Dabs is called into the room and eventually agrees to do it for £6,000. Jay makes it clear that the others must not see Sam's face when the murder happens. Dabs tells Henry about the plan. Not willing to kill a man, Henry tells Dabs not to go through with it. A scuffle happens and Dabs hits Henry over the head with a brick. Later, Dabs and Blammy meet Omen and tell him about the job. Omen agrees after Dabs lies that Sam was the one who hurt Henry.

Sam and Lexi meet and Sam learns that she was gang raped years ago, which led her into drug addiction because as they are having sex she pushes him away. As he gets up she sees various scars on his back and it is revealed they were given to him by Curtis as revenge for Trife's death. Jay meets with Moony and his girlfriend Kayla in a café and tells Robert that he could have prevented Trife's death. Jay tries to convince Robert to help him track down Sam, but Robert tells Jay that he needs to move on.

Later, the teenage hit-men see Sam walking through a park and tackle him to the ground. With Sam's face to the floor, Dabs tells Omen to stab him, but Omen insists on seeing his face first. It is then revealed that Omen is Sam's brother, Royston. He refuses to kill his own brother, and realises that Dabs knew who it was. Sam is about to kill Dabs, but has a flashback to the murder and relents, he instead knocks Dabs unconscious and leaves with the two teenagers.

Meanwhile, Jay arrives at Lexi's flat, revealing himself as her dealer; Lexi was setting up Sam by bringing him back to her flat. Sam phones the man he spoke to outside the prison and asks for the favour the man promised him earlier in the film. Sam walks down a street and apologetically mugs a couple at gunpoint; he uses the stolen phone to call the police about an armed robbery, telling them the criminal is going into the house he is about to enter. Using the items he stole, he goes into Ike's house pretending to want to sell them. Meanwhile, Sam's contact phones Curtis and tells him where Sam is. While Sam is holding them all at gun point, the armed police show up and arrest Ike, Andreas, and Curtis, but Sam escapes.

On the way home, Sam is attacked by Jay. Jay holds him at gunpoint and a fight ensues. Sam realises that Jay is just like he was six years ago and cannot bring himself to commit murder. Safe in the knowledge that Jay is not really dangerous, an injured Sam leaves the fight.

Wandering aimlessly, Sam finds that Lexi has left a message on his phone asking him to spend time with her, and manages to make his way to her flat, and the two smile as he enters.

== Cast ==
- Noel Clarke as Sam Peel
- Adam Deacon as Jay
- Scarlett Alice Johnson as Lexi
- Femi Oyeniran as Robert "Moony"
- Red Madrell as Alisa
- Jacob Anderson as Omen (Royston Peel)
- Ben Drew as Dabs
- Wil Johnson as Big Man
- Nathan Constance as Ike
- Adjoa Andoh as Mrs. Peel
- Madeleine Fairley as Claire
- Rhoda Montemayor as Kim
- Danny Dyer as Hayden
- Lindsey Jordan as Devo
- Kiera Booth as Tramp
- Arnold Oceng as Henry
- Don Klass as Blammy
- Troy Glasgow as Jehvon
- David Ajala as Police Community Support Officer (PCSO) Desmond "Buds"
- Pierre Mascolo as Andreas
- Shanika Warren-Markland as Kayla

== Soundtrack ==
Adulthood: Music from the Motion Picture

Soundtrack album by various artists
- Released: 30 June 2008
- Genre: Grime
- Label: Altered Ego

Adulthood: Music from the Motion Picture was released on 30 June 2008 by Altered Ego.

1. "Over Here" (Maniac & Bashy featuring Ghetts & J2K)
2. "End in the Streets" (Plan B)
3. "F Ur Ex" (Sway)
4. "My Dunks" (The Clik Clik)
5. "Paranoid" (Dizzee Rascal)
6. "Kids of the Underground" (Scarlett & Viva featuring The Audio Bullys)
7. "Reppin' London" (Sincere featuring D Double E & Scorcher)
8. "Follow" (Tinchy Stryder)
9. "Running for Life" (Eliza Doolittle)
10. "On It 08" (Adam Deacon featuring Plan B, Snakeyman, Blazay & Alphadecious)
11. "Bars of Truth" (No Lay)
12. "Who Are You" (Chipmunk)
13. "Look What You've Done" (Lethal Bizzle featuring Kate Nash)
14. "Kids" (Goldie Locks)
15. "Grime Kid" (Wiley)
16. "I Need Love" (Plan B featuring Jacob Anderson)
17. "Run Dry" (Kerry-Anne Leatham)
18. "Reach" (Skrein)
19. "Adamhood" (Adam Deacon)
20. "Arms Open Wide" (Shystie)
21. "Kidulthood to Adulthood" (Maniac & Bashy)

== Awards and nominations ==
- Screen Nation: Honorary Production Award 2009 – Adulthood – Winner
- BAFTA Awards: Orange Rising Star Award 2009 – Noel Clarke – Winner

== Sequel ==
A sequel called Brotherhood was released on 29 August 2016.

== See also ==
- Kidulthood
- Anuvahood
- West 10 LDN
- 4.3.2.1
- List of hood films
