= Brotherhood (2016 film) =

2016 film

- Film poster
- Directed by: Noel Clarke
- Written by: Noel Clarke
- Produced by: Noel Clarke; Jason Maza
- Starring: Noel Clarke; Jason Maza; Bashy; Olivia Chenery; David Ajala
- Cinematography: Aaron Reid
- Edited by: Tommy Boulding
- Music by: Tom Linden
- Production company: Unstoppable Entertainment
- Distributed by: Lionsgate
- Release date: 29 August 2016
- Running time: 105 minutes
- Country: United Kingdom
- Language: English
- Box office: $4.6 million

Brotherhood (stylised as BrOTHERHOOD) is a 2016 British crime drama film written, produced and directed by Noel Clarke. It is the sequel to 2006's Kidulthood and 2008's Adulthood, and the third and final instalment of The Hood Trilogy. It stars Clarke, Jason Maza (who also co-produced the film), Arnold Oceng, Stormzy, Cornell John, David Ajala, Shanika Warren-Markland and Adjoa Andoh. Brotherhood follows Sam (Clarke), now a family man of two children, being driven back to his criminal lifestyle.

Clarke initially did not want to make a third film, but eventually returned in 2015 to write, direct and star in the third film of his Hood Trilogy. Filming began in London in November.

Brotherhood was screened in the Special Presentations section at the 2016 Toronto International Film Festival and was released on 29 August 2016. The film received mixed reviews and becoming the highest-grossing film in the trilogy.

== Plot ==
Ten years after the events of Adulthood, retired criminal Sam Peel has settled down with his girlfriend Kayla and their two children, while financially supporting Alisa and her teenage daughter, whose father was "Trife", whom he killed years ago. Alisa has forgiven Sam, but wants him to tell her daughter what happened to Trife. One day, Sam overhears a girl describe how she was attacked by a man named "Mooks". While performing at a gig, Sam's brother Royston is shot by a gunman, Drew, who leaves behind an envelope addressed to Sam. Visiting a recovering Royston in the hospital, Sam learns from Royston's bandmate Henry that Drew was ordered to shoot Royston. Henry gives Sam the envelope, containing an address, which he insists Sam must go to alone.

On the way to the address, Sam bumps into a woman, Janette, who "accidentally" spills coffee. At her flat, she seduces Sam while recording the encounter. Sam arrives at the address, a mansion, and enters but he is outnumbered and beaten. Daley intervenes on behalf of Mooks, the criminal boss. Sam refuses to work with Daley, and is taken to the basement where he sees Curtis, Trife's uncle, who wants revenge for Trife's death and for Curtis's time in prison. Sam escapes the house but is caught by Drew and other thugs. When Henry arrives to rescue Sam, Hugs stabs a thug as a warning. Sam calls Kayla and tells her to hide the family from Curtis. However, upon seeing the DVD of his sexual encounter with Janette, an angry Kayla leaves him. Sam seeks help from his old friend Buds, now a detective, but Buds cannot enter the mansion without a warrant.

Furious that Sam has contacted the police, Daley orders Curtis to hurt Sam's family. Instead, Curtis and Hugs conspire to kill Daley and take over. Sam and Royston's mother Mrs. Peel sees Janette being attacked, and brings her inside. As Janette texts someone, Mrs. Peel calls Sam who senses he is being set up and that Janette works for Daley; she lets in Curtis and Hugs, who kills Mrs. Peel. The police arrest Sam; but Buds releases him. At the funeral, Royston tells Sam that he is moving to America with his pregnant fiancée. Sam and Kayla have sex after the funeral, but Kayla refuses to return to Sam until he ends his involvement with Curtis and Daley.

Sam breaks into the gym, looking for a gun. Brick tells Sam that he and Calvin are seeking revenge on Mooks for raping Sariya, Brick's daughter. Sam and Henry track down Daley's henchman, helped by Hassan. Sam assaults Drew who reveals Curtis' and Daley's whereabouts. Elsewhere, Henry encounters one of Mooks' henchmen, Yardz, and confesses that he has been lying to his girlfriend to hide from her and his son, who he wrongly thinks is not his. Henry also successfully persuades Yardz to change his life and leave Mooks.

Sam storms Daley's estate with Hassan, Henry, Brick, Sariya and Calvin, as police approach. They link with Curtis and Hugs. As Sam knocks out Janette and kicks the door open, Daley, suspecting that he was being double-crossed by his gang, fatally stabs Hugs and escapes. Sam pulls the knife from Hugs as the police arrive and make arrests. After being exonerated by Buds, Sam calls Curtis to fight to the death. Sam overpowers Curtis and wrestles a gun away. He pulls out the bullets, dropping them and the gun on the floor. Curtis loads a single bullet, but before he can shoot Sam, police gun him down. Dying, Curtis tells Sam where Daley is.

Sam, Brick, Sariya and Calvin find Daley filling a bag with money. The four unmask Daley as Mooks, the real boss, and confront him for beating and raping Sariya. Sam takes the bag from him and leaves as Brick shoots Mooks dead.

Safely away, Sam divides up the money with Royston, Alisa, and everyone who helped him get revenge on Curtis, Drew and Mooks. Strolling with his family, Sam encounters Buds, who refuses to help him any further but affirms they are still friends, warning him to stay out of trouble.

== Cast ==
- Noel Clarke as Sam Peel
- Bashy as Calvin
- Olivia Chenery as Sariya
- Nick Nevern as DCI Parkinson
- Steven Cree as Brick
- David Ajala as DCI Desmond "Buds" Lynch
- Arnold Oceng as Henry
- Tonia Sotiropoulou as Janette
- Jason Maza as Daley/Mooks
- Stormzy as Yardz
- Aaron Eaton as Teardrop
- Red Madrell as Alisa
- Cornell John as Curtis
- Jack McMullen as Drew
- Fady Elsayed as Wino
- Leeshon Alexander as Hugz
- Daniel Anthony as Royston Peel
- Shanika Warren-Markland as Kayla
- Mahalia Burkmar as Thea

== Critical reaction ==
Brotherhood received a mixed critical response. Writing in The Observer, Wendy Ide praised Clarke's direction and performance, but "Clarke goes and spoils it all by using naked women as set dressing and cramming the frame with flash gangster clichés, which rather undermines the anti-aspirational message of the film". Terri White of Empire praised Clarke's uncompromising portrayal of inner city life, but criticized Maza's performance and that, "Clarke can't avoid employing the third-in-a-trilogy tropes: one last job/reformed guy helps new guy who is essentially him/grossly unfair family tragedy as his three-parter reaches its too-neat conclusion".

== See also ==
- List of hood films
