= Metrosexuality (TV series) =

- Genre: Comedy; Drama
- Created by: Rikki Beadle-Blair
- Starring: Rikki Beadle-Blair; Noel Clarke; Rebecca Varney
- Country of origin: United Kingdom
- Original language: English
- No. of series: 1
- No. of episodes: 6

Production
- Production location: England

Original release
- Network: Channel 4
- Release: 21 February – 3 March 2001

Metrosexuality is a British television comedy drama, which aired on Channel 4 in 2001 as a short-run series of six episodes. It was later re-edited into a single feature for DVD release by TLA Releasing. It depicts the interactions of a racially and sexually diverse group of friends and family living in Notting Hill.

The series was written and created by Rikki Beadle-Blair, who also stars as one of the show's central characters. The cast also includes Noel Clarke, Paul Keating, Mat Fraser, Karl Collins, Pui Fan Lee and Preeya Kalidas. The show features extravagant and colourful costumes and scenery, varied shooting styles and quick pacing. Much of the music was written and performed by Beadle Blair, who intended the series to feel like a musical.

The show was hailed by critics for its diversity; it depicted a social setting relatively free of racism or homophobia. The cast also included Mat Fraser, a thalidomide survivor with phocomelic arms.

== Plot outline ==
The story is set over the course of two consecutive weekends in spring, and follows Kwame (Clarke), seventeen and straight, who is trying to reconcile his estranged fathers, Max (Beadle Blair) and Jordan (Collins). He must contend with Max's insistence that he is over Jordan, and Jordan's new relationship with former military man Jonno. Kwame is also trying to attract his love interest, Asha, and provide support to his two best friends: Dean (Keating), a talented footballer struggling with an abusive father and a crush on Max, and skater boy Bambi, trying unsuccessfully to secure a commitment from his older, on-off boyfriend, Robin.

Max's married friends Geri and Daniel descend into a bitter separation after Geri feels Daniel takes her for granted; she is later romanced by Asha's father, Tel. Asha's best friend Jay (Lee) embarks on a new relationship with the enigmatic Flora, despite her own commitment issues. Former drug addicts Peggy and Pablo struggle to adapt to a life of sobriety together - especially when Peggy gets back in touch with their dealer, Dean's brother Marlon (Fraser). Max's sister Cindy finds her relationship with her partner Doris threatened by the reappearance of her first boyfriend, Gabriel. Kwame's unstable birth mother, Hilly, deals with the death of her cat and reconnects with her estranged parents.

== Cast ==
Kwame O'Reilly - Noel Clarke

Asha - Rebecca Varney

Max - Rikki Beadle Blair

Dean - Paul Keating

Bambi - Davie Fairbanks

Jordan - Karl Collins

Jonno - Silas Carlson

Hilly - Helen Sheals

Cindy - Carleen Beadle

Doris - Dee Dee Samuels

Robin - Michael Dotchin

Jay - Pui Fan Lee

Flora - Preya Kaleedas

Gerri - Frances Lima

Daniel - Matt Harris

Tel - David Squire

Gabriel - Joni Levinson

Pablo - Gavin Delaney

Peggy - Lisa Harmer

Bambi's Mum - Marianne Sheehan

Bambi's Dad - Jonathan Pembroke

Marlon Gittar - Mat Fraser

Alda Gittar - Paddy Glynn

Colin Gittar - Josh Moran

Lola - Danielle Murphy

Cafe Patron - Simon C Gray

== Music ==
The track listing on the soundtrack, officially titled Metrosexuality Songs, is as follows:

1. It's All About Love (The Theme) 2. First To Say 3. You So Lovely 4. I'm Your Guy 5. Cowboy Love 6. House Boy 7. Free To Be Lonely 8. Saturday Thru Sunday 9. Hip-Hop Love 10. Let The One Who Loves You Love You 11. In Your Eyes There Is God 12. Lay Me Down 13. Don't Cry My Baby Love 14. Gangsta Bwoy 15. Gangsta Man 16. All About Punk Love 17. Fly With Me 18. Love Is Power

- All songs are composed and produced by Rikki Beadle Blair and Mark Hawkes.
- Rikki performs all the music, except "Gangsta Man" (performed by Mat Fraser).
- Music runs through most of the movie, and many songs are reprised several times in alternate forms (notably a dance version of the mid-tempo "Free To Be Lonely").
- The back cover of the CD has a copyright date of 2000, but the disc itself has a copyright date of 2001.
- Tracks 5, 9, 13, and 16 are not full songs; they are short versions of track 1 in various styles of music (downtempo, hip hop, ballad, and rock, respectively). A jazz version and a reggae version, featured in the movie, are not included on the soundtrack.
