= BAFTA Rising Star Award =

British film award for upcoming actors

Rising Star Award
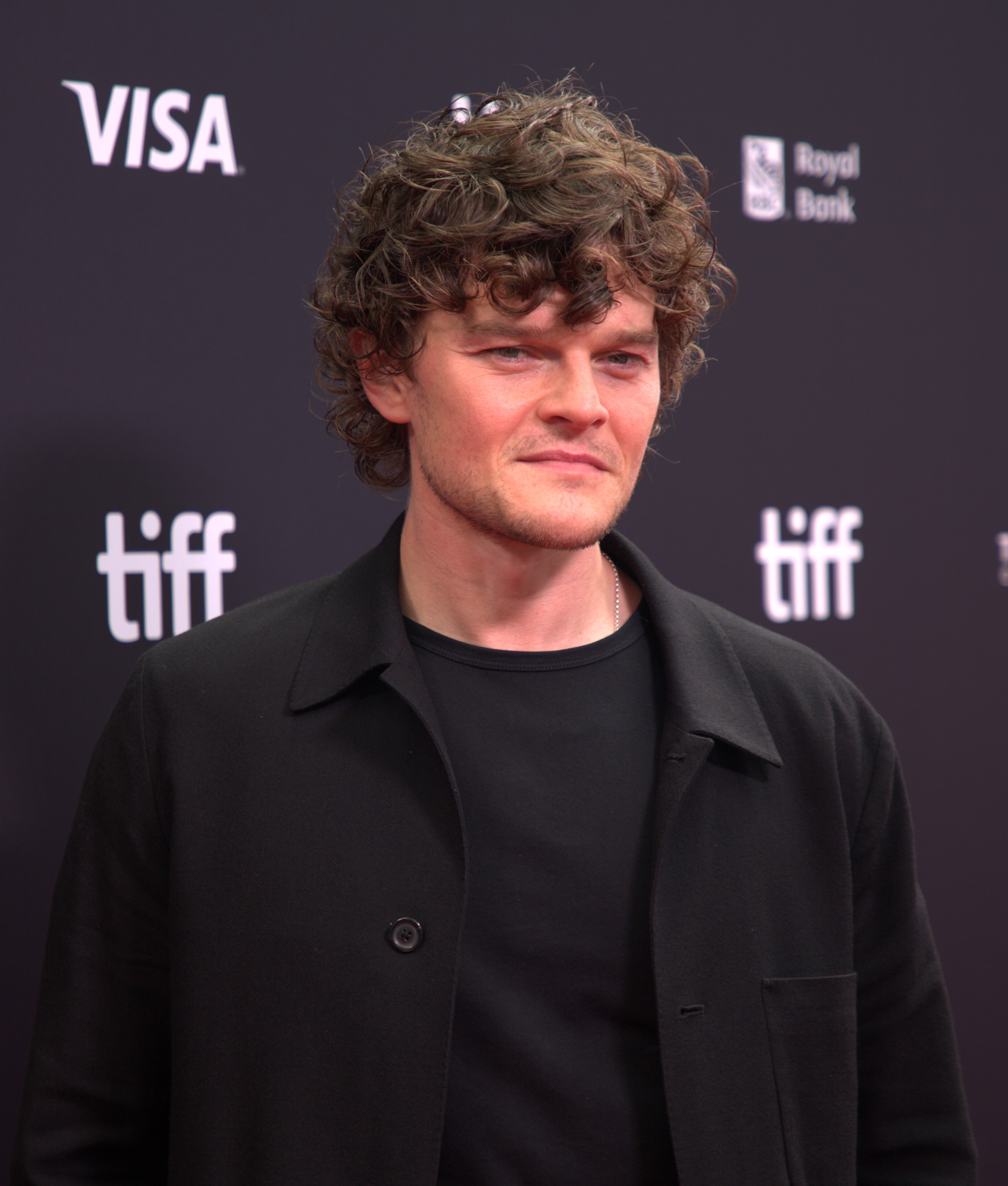
- The 2025 recipient: Robert Aramayo
- Location: United Kingdom
- Presented by: British Academy of Film and Television Arts
- Currently held by: Robert Aramayo (2025)
- Website: http://www.bafta.org/

The EE British Academy of Film and Television Arts (BAFTA) Rising Star Award, currently styled as the EE Rising Star Award for commercial reasons and previously known as the Orange Rising Star Award, is a film award that acknowledges new talent in the acting industry. It is presented annually at the British Academy Film Awards.

The five nominees are chosen regardless of gender, nationality and whether they have made a breakthrough in television, film or both. Despite the nominees being chosen by the BAFTA juries, the winner is chosen entirely by public votes via text, internet or phone. This award was sponsored by Orange UK until 2012 and has been sponsored by EE since 2013.

== History ==
The award was created after Mary Selway died in 2004. She has been recognised for her successful role as a casting director and helped many new actors and actresses achieve fame.

The first winner was James McAvoy in 2006. Eva Green, Shia LaBeouf and Kristen Stewart have been the only non-British winners. The current holder of the award is Robert Aramayo, who won in 2026.

In the following lists, the titles and names in bold with a gold background are the winners and recipients respectively; those not in bold are the nominees. The years given are those in which the films under consideration were released, not the year of the ceremony, which always takes place the following year.

== Winners and nominees ==
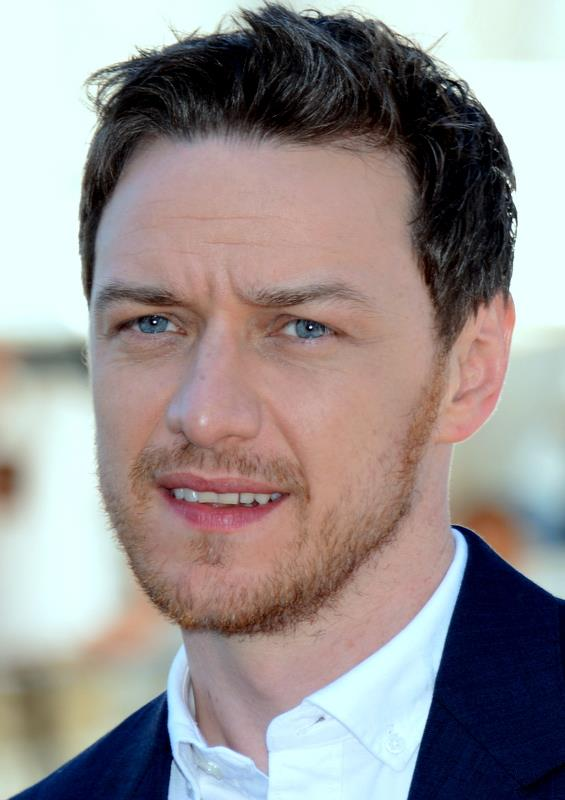
Scottish actor James McAvoy was the first winner of this category.

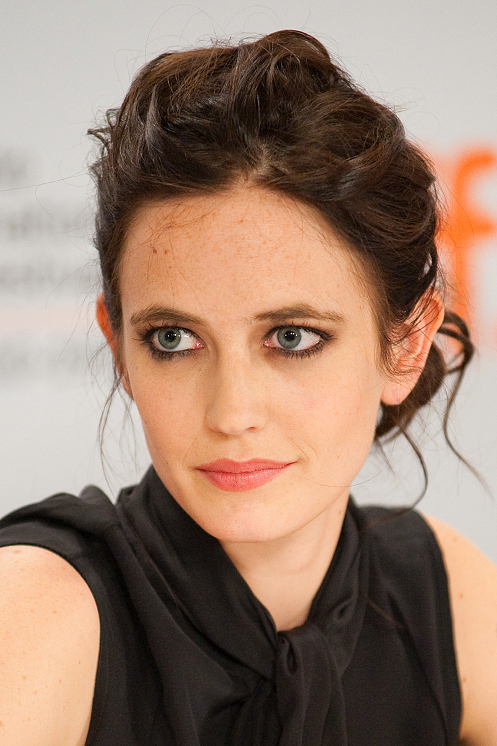
French actress Eva Green was the first female winner.

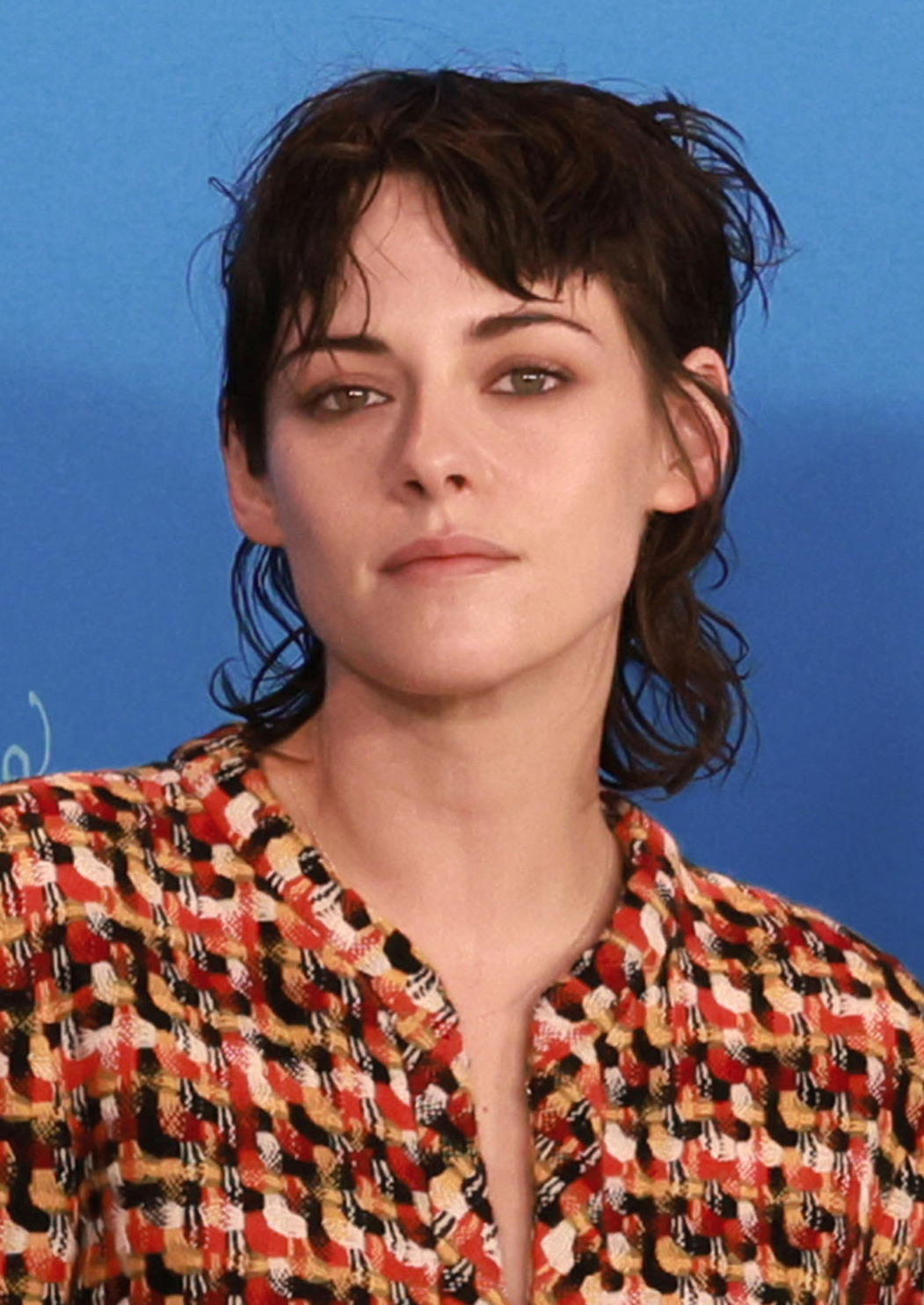
American actress Kristen Stewart won in 2009.

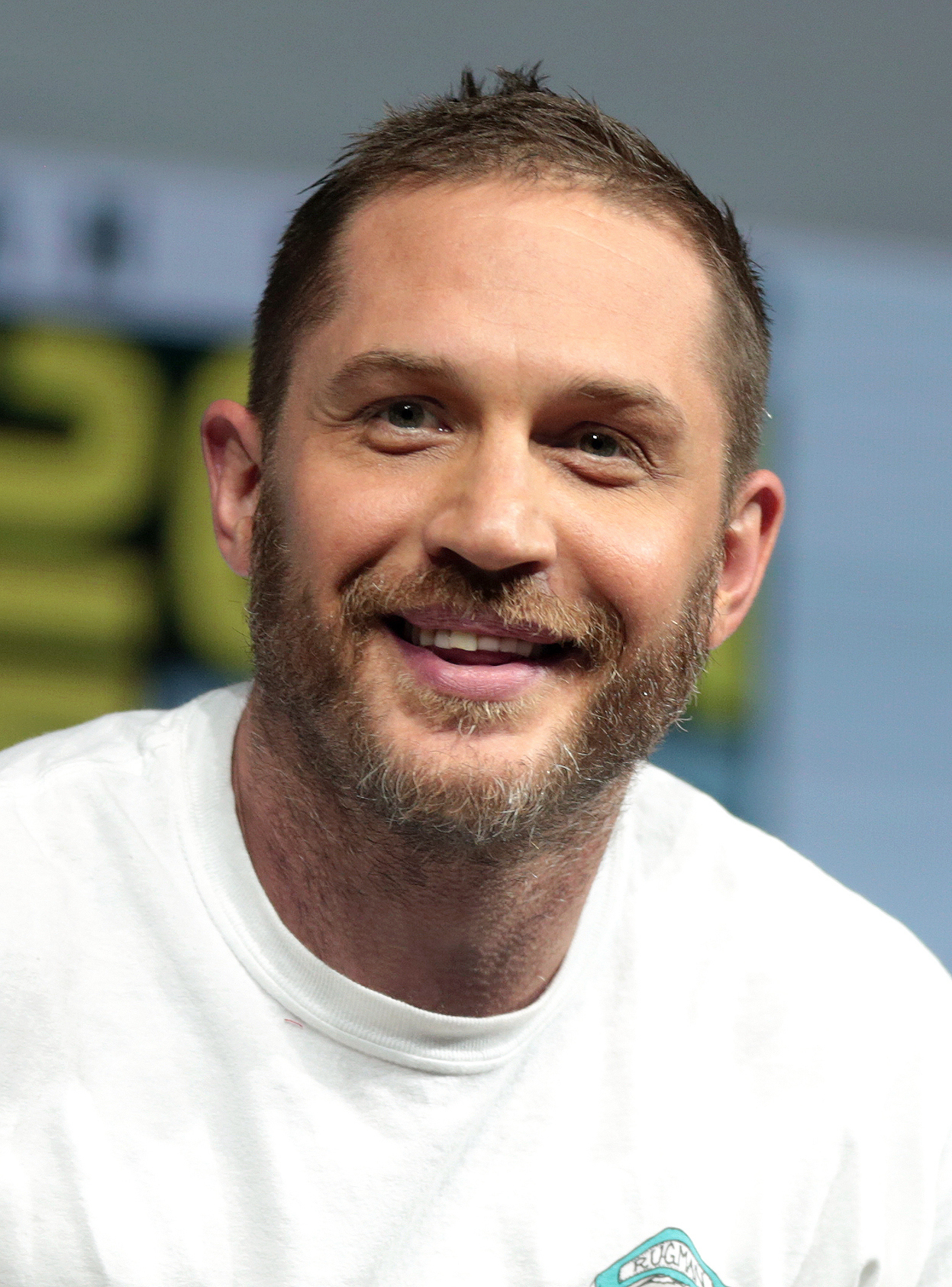
English actor Tom Hardy won in 2010.

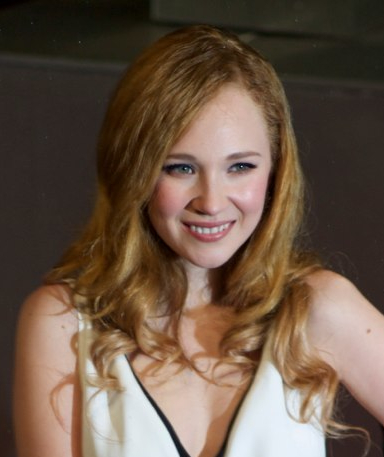
English actress Juno Temple won in 2012.

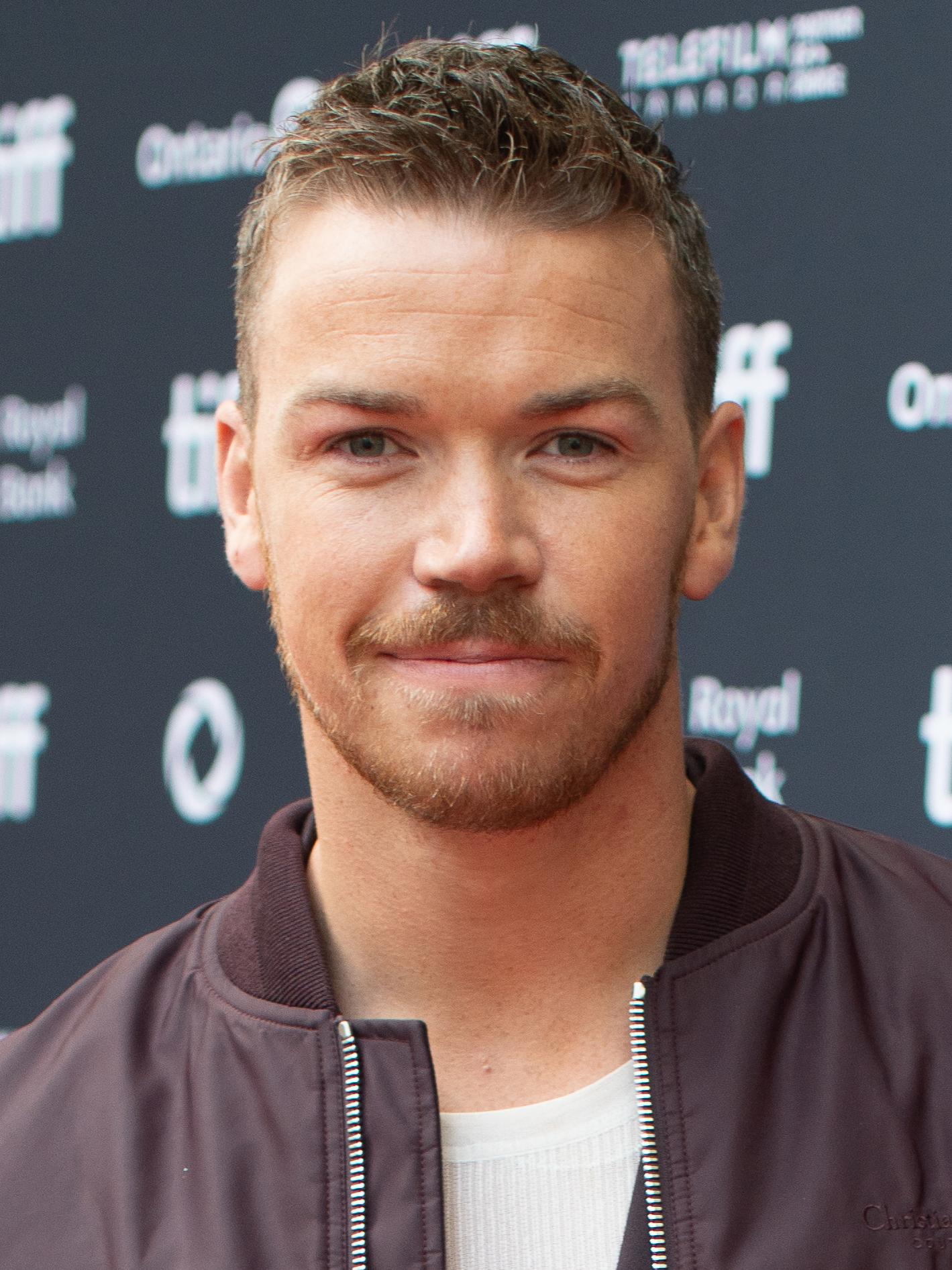
English actor Will Poulter won in 2013.

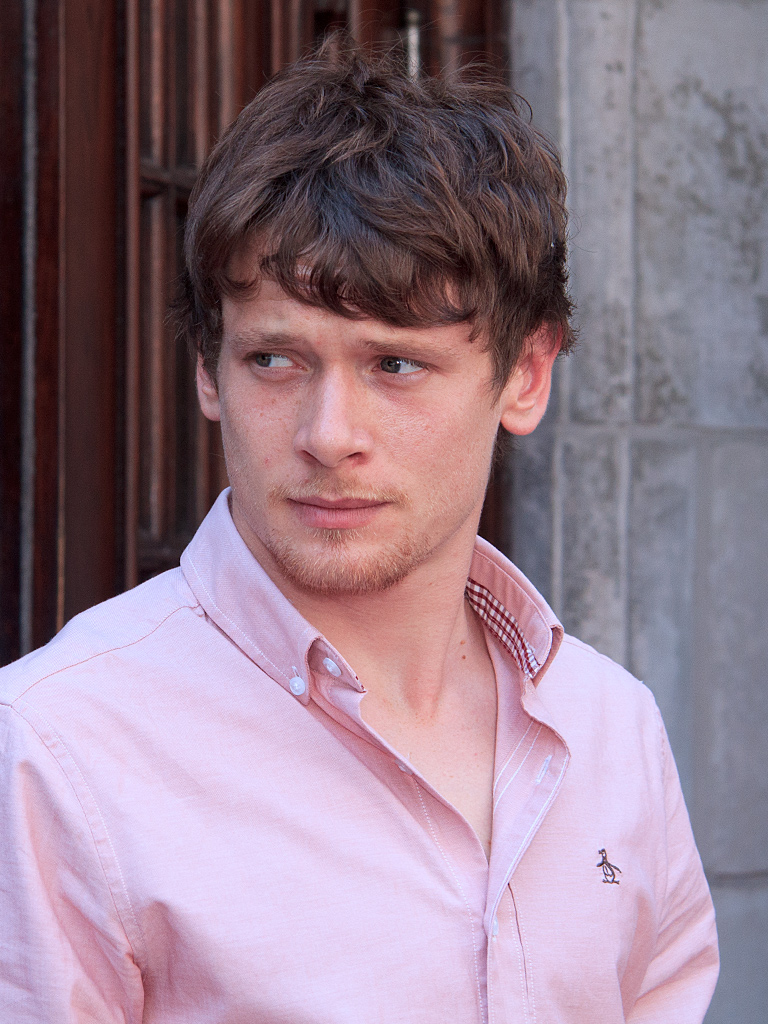
English actor Jack O'Connell won in 2014.

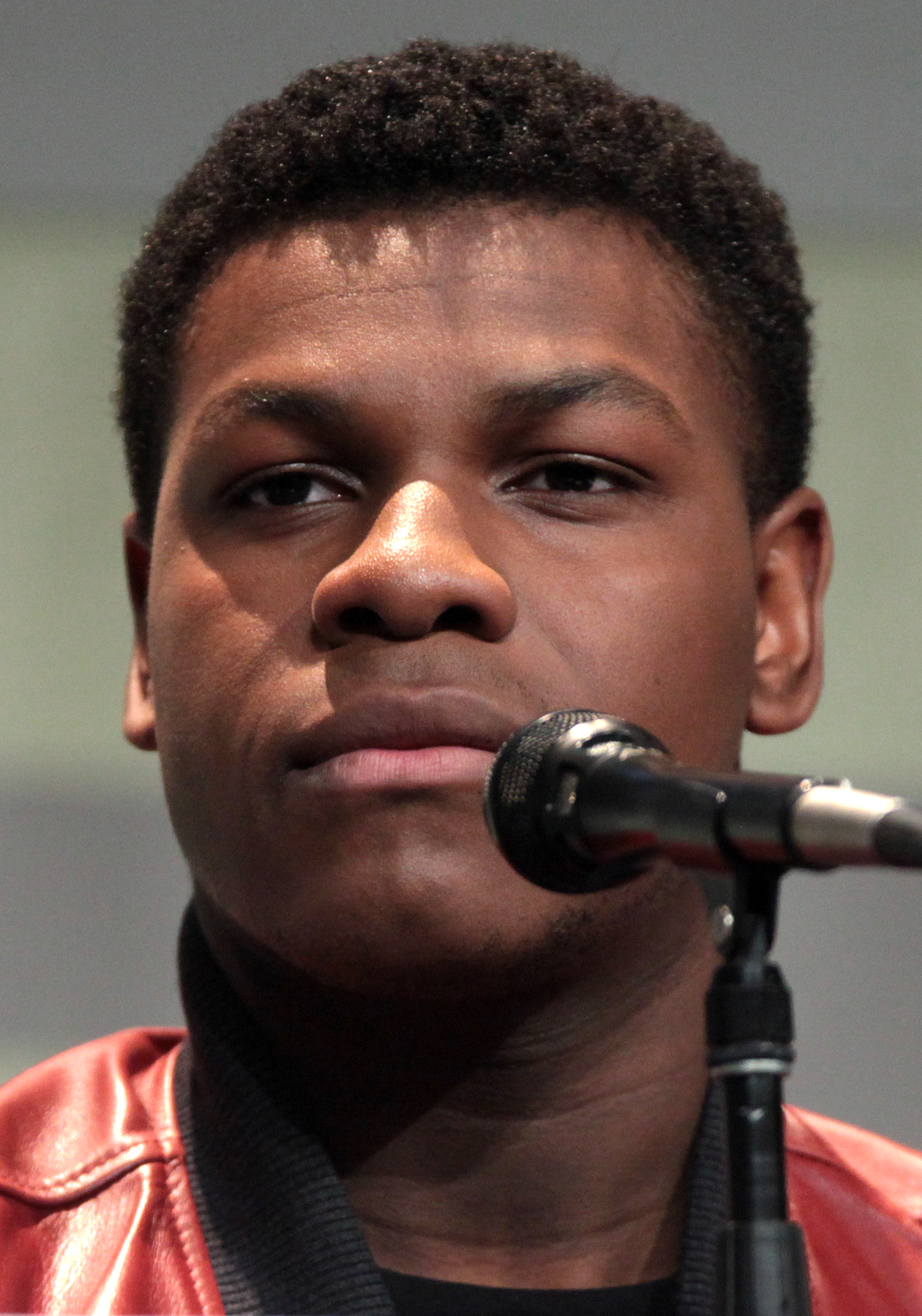
English actor John Boyega won in 2015.

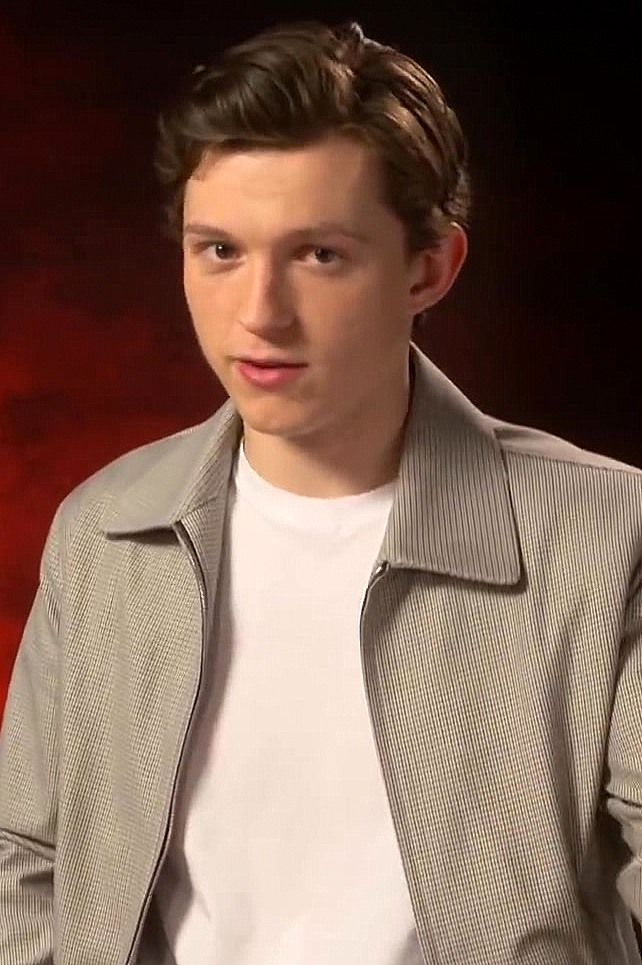
English actor Tom Holland won in 2016.

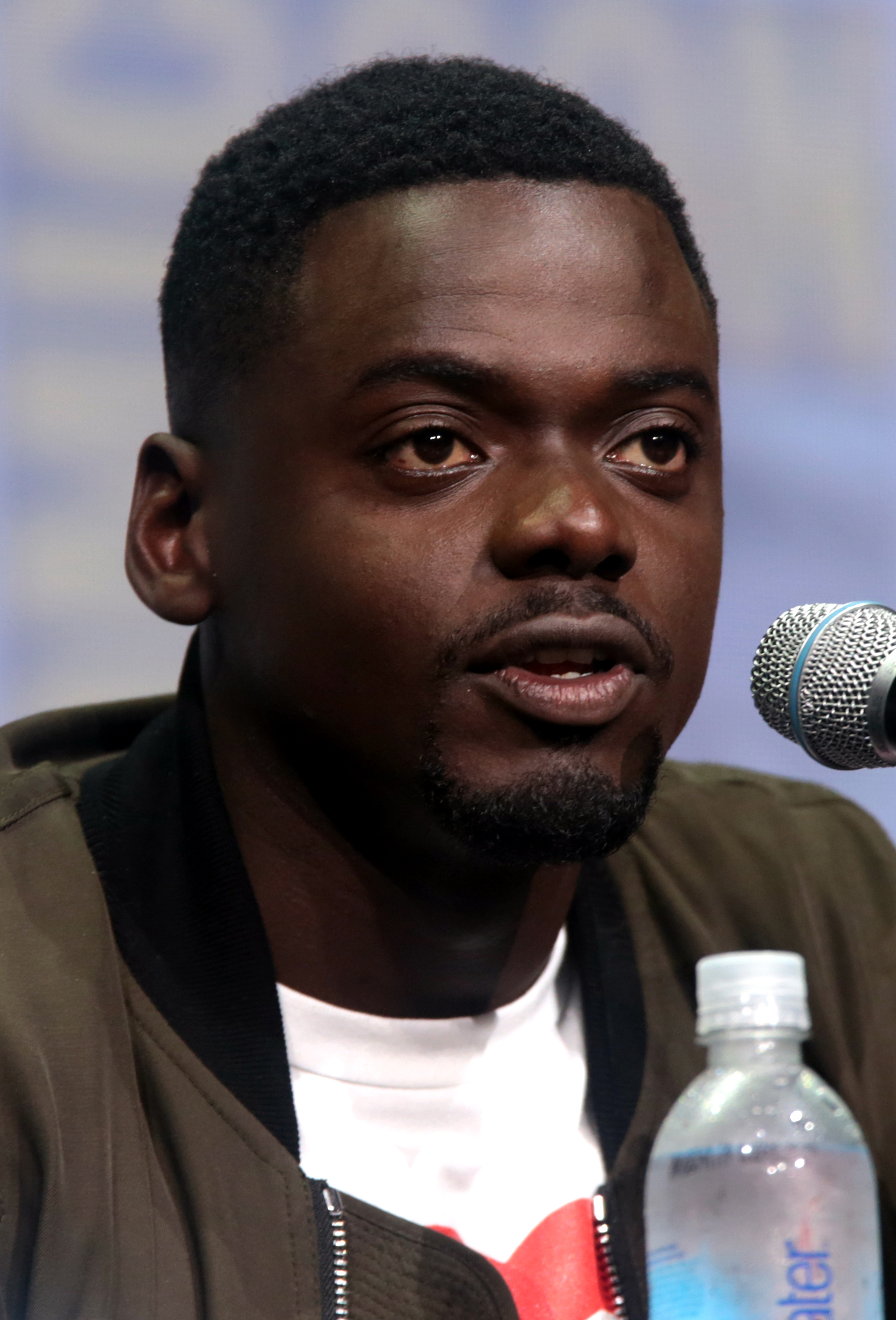
British actor Daniel Kaluuya won in 2017

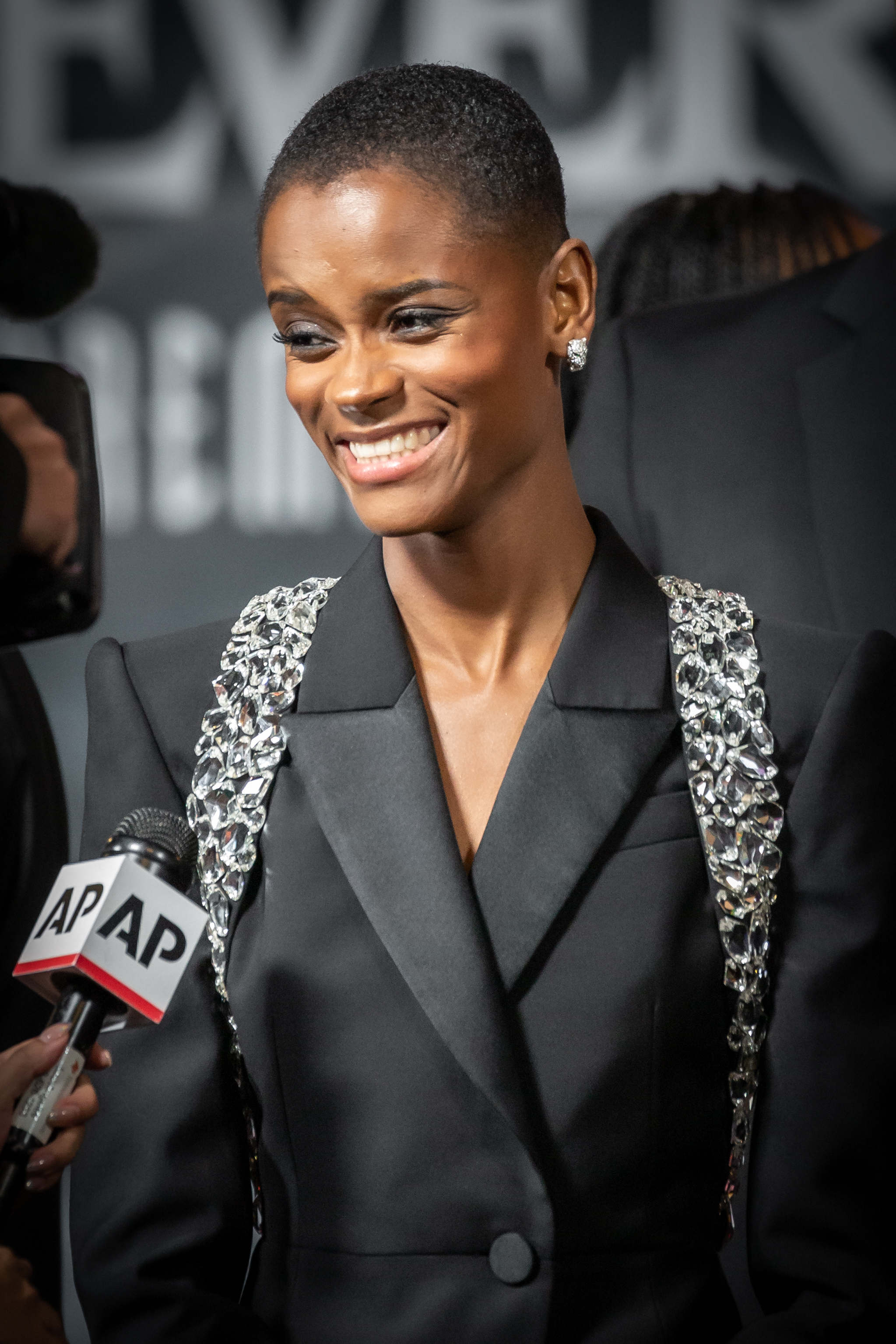
Guyanese-English actress Letitia Wright won in 2018.

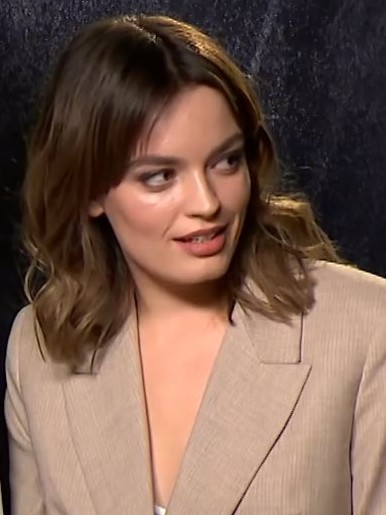
French-British actress Emma Mackey won in 2022.

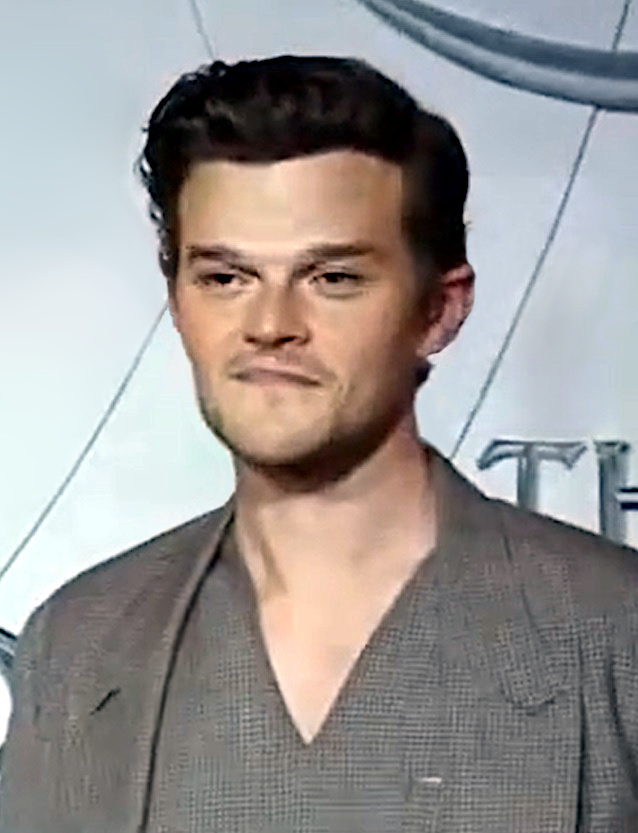
English actor Robert Aramayo won in 2026

indicates the winner

=== 2000s ===
Year	Recipient	Ref.
**2005** (59th)	**James McAvoy**	
**2005** (59th)	Chiwetel Ejiofor	
**2005** (59th)	Gael García Bernal	
**2005** (59th)	Rachel McAdams	
**2005** (59th)	Michelle Williams	
**2006** (60th)	**Eva Green**	
**2006** (60th)	Emily Blunt	
**2006** (60th)	Naomie Harris	
**2006** (60th)	Cillian Murphy	
**2006** (60th)	Ben Whishaw	
**2007** (61st)	**Shia LaBeouf**	
**2007** (61st)	Sienna Miller	
**2007** (61st)	Elliot Page (Note: Credited as Ellen Page; He earned the nomination before his gender transition in 2020.)	
**2007** (61st)	Sam Riley	
**2007** (61st)	Tang Wei	
**2008** (62nd)	**Noel Clarke**	
**2008** (62nd)	Michael Cera	
**2008** (62nd)	Michael Fassbender	
**2008** (62nd)	Rebecca Hall	
**2008** (62nd)	Toby Kebbell	
**2009** (63rd)	**Kristen Stewart**	
**2009** (63rd)	Jesse Eisenberg	
**2009** (63rd)	Nicholas Hoult	
**2009** (63rd)	Carey Mulligan	
**2009** (63rd)	Tahar Rahim	

=== 2010s ===
Year	Recipient	Ref.
**2010** (64th)	**Tom Hardy**	
**2010** (64th)	Gemma Arterton	
**2010** (64th)	Andrew Garfield	
**2010** (64th)	Aaron Johnson	
**2010** (64th)	Emma Stone	
**2011** (65th)	**Adam Deacon**	
**2011** (65th)	Chris Hemsworth	
**2011** (65th)	Tom Hiddleston	
**2011** (65th)	Chris O'Dowd	
**2011** (65th)	Eddie Redmayne	
**2012** (66th)	**Juno Temple**	
**2012** (66th)	Elizabeth Olsen	
**2012** (66th)	Andrea Riseborough	
**2012** (66th)	Suraj Sharma	
**2012** (66th)	Alicia Vikander	
**2013** (67th)	**Will Poulter**	
**2013** (67th)	Dane DeHaan	
**2013** (67th)	George MacKay	
**2013** (67th)	Lupita Nyong'o	
**2013** (67th)	Léa Seydoux	
**2014** (68th)	**Jack O'Connell**	
**2014** (68th)	Gugu Mbatha-Raw	
**2014** (68th)	Margot Robbie	
**2014** (68th)	Miles Teller	
**2014** (68th)	Shailene Woodley	
**2015** (69th)	**John Boyega**	
**2015** (69th)	Taron Egerton	
**2015** (69th)	Dakota Johnson	
**2015** (69th)	Brie Larson	
**2015** (69th)	Bel Powley	
**2016** (70th)	**Tom Holland**	
**2016** (70th)	Laia Costa	
**2016** (70th)	Lucas Hedges	
**2016** (70th)	Ruth Negga	
**2016** (70th)	Anya Taylor-Joy	
**2017** (71st)	**Daniel Kaluuya** (Note: Kaluuya was the first Rising Star Award recipient who would go on to win a BAFTA in a major acting category (Best Actor in a Supporting Role for Judas and the Black Messiah).)	
**2017** (71st)	Timothée Chalamet	
**2017** (71st)	Josh O'Connor	
**2017** (71st)	Florence Pugh	
**2017** (71st)	Tessa Thompson	
**2018** (72nd)	**Letitia Wright**	
**2018** (72nd)	Jessie Buckley	
**2018** (72nd)	Cynthia Erivo	
**2018** (72nd)	Barry Keoghan	
**2018** (72nd)	Lakeith Stanfield	
**2019** (73rd)	**Micheal Ward**	
**2019** (73rd)	Awkwafina	
**2019** (73rd)	Kaitlyn Dever	
**2019** (73rd)	Kelvin Harrison Jr.	
**2019** (73rd)	Jack Lowden	

=== 2020s ===
Year	Recipient	Ref.
**2020** (74th)	**Bukky Bakray**	
**2020** (74th)	Kingsley Ben-Adir	
**2020** (74th)	Morfydd Clark	
**2020** (74th)	Ṣọpẹ Dìrísù	
**2020** (74th)	Conrad Khan	
**2021** (75th)	**Lashana Lynch**	
**2021** (75th)	Ariana DeBose	
**2021** (75th)	Harris Dickinson	
**2021** (75th)	Millicent Simmonds	
**2021** (75th)	Kodi Smit-McPhee	
**2022** (76th)	**Emma Mackey**	
**2022** (76th)	Naomi Ackie	
**2022** (76th)	Sheila Atim	
**2022** (76th)	Daryl McCormack	
**2022** (76th)	Aimee Lou Wood	
**2023** (77th)	**Mia McKenna-Bruce**	
**2023** (77th)	Phoebe Dynevor	
**2023** (77th)	Ayo Edebiri	
**2023** (77th)	Jacob Elordi	
**2023** (77th)	Sophie Wilde	
**2024** (78th)	**David Jonsson**	
**2024** (78th)	Marisa Abela	
**2024** (78th)	Jharrel Jerome	
**2024** (78th)	Mikey Madison	
**2024** (78th)	Nabhaan Rizwan	
**2025** (79th)	**Robert Aramayo** (Note: Aramayo was the first person to win the Rising Star Award and a BAFTA in a major acting category at the same ceremony (Best Actor in a Leading Role for I Swear).)	
**2025** (79th)	Miles Caton	
**2025** (79th)	Chase Infiniti	
**2025** (79th)	Archie Madekwe	
**2025** (79th)	Posy Sterling	
