= Adam Deacon =

British actor (born 1983)

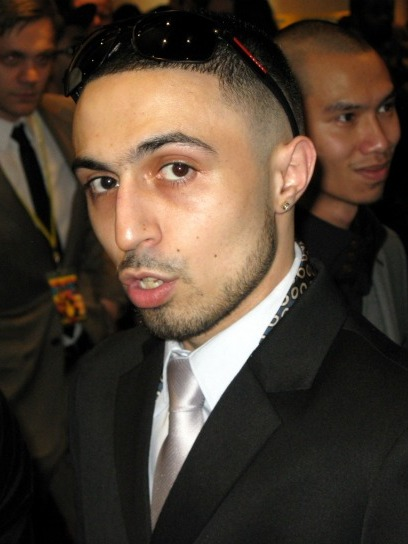
- Deacon in 2012
- Born: Adam Steven Deacon; 4 March 1983 (age 43); Hackney, London, England
- Occupation: Actor
- Years active: 1995–present
- Awards: BAFTA Rising Star Award

Adam Steven Deacon (born 4 March 1983) is an English actor. He is known for his lead role in the films Kidulthood, sequel Adulthood, and for his directorial debut, Anuvahood.

== Early life ==
Deacon was brought up by his English mother in Stoke Newington, Hackney. His father is Moroccan. His father walked out on the family when Deacon was two years old, and the pair have had no contact.

== Career ==
Although his acting career began with guest appearances in Bill's New Frock, Shooters, Ali G Indahouse and The Bill, he also starred in the ITV drama Wall of Silence in 2004. Deacon's breakthrough came when he landed a starring role in the urban drama film Kidulthood. He then worked with the film's writer and director Noel Clarke on a number of other projects until 2011, including the sequel Adulthood, 4.3.2.1. and the one-off television pilot West 10 LDN.

Deacon co-wrote, co-directed and played the lead role in urban comedy Anuvahood. Following this, Time Out magazine labeled Deacon "The New Face of Youth Cinema". In February 2012, he won the BAFTA Rising Star Award.

Deacon has since appeared in many lead and supporting roles in feature films, including Bonded by Blood, Jack Falls, Shank, Everywhere and Nowhere and Payback Season. He had a guest role in Victim. In November 2012, he co-hosted the Music of Black Origin Awards telecast with Miquita Oliver where Deacon played a comical part in the awards. In May 2021, he appeared in an episode of the BBC soap opera Doctors as TK Nelson.

== Legal issues ==
In July 2015, he was found guilty of harassment without violence at West London Magistrates' Court, having had a highly publicised feud with Noel Clarke with accusations of Clarke bullying him and sabotaging Deacon's career, which Clarke stated was not true. On 20 July, Deacon was found guilty. The court, which heard that Deacon had been diagnosed with bipolar disorder and had been self-medicating using cannabis, banned Deacon from contacting Clarke again.

On 7 April 2016, he was arrested after police were called to reports of a man reportedly armed with a machete style knife and threatening members of the public in London. He was unable to attend a hearing in March due to being "in hospital for treatment for underlying mental health issues". On 7 April, a jury delivered two not-guilty verdicts for affray and possessing an offensive weapon accepting Deacon was mentally ill and not criminally responsible for his actions.

== Filmography ==
=== Film ===
Year	Title	Role	Notes
2002	Shooters	Runners kid	
2002	Ali G Indahouse	Member of the East Staines Massiv	
2004	Strange Little Girls	Boy	Short film
2006	Kidulthood	Jay	
2006	Wilderness	Blue	
2007	Alan & Samir	Samir	Short film
2007	Sugarhouse	Ray	
2008	Adulthood	Jay	
2008	One of Those Days	Angel Steward 1	Short film
2008	Dead Set	Space	Television Miniseries
2010	Shank	Kickz	
2010	4.3.2.1.	Dillon	
2010	Bonded by Blood	Darren Nicholls	
2010	Diary of a Badman	Charles The Boss	Short film
2010	Conviction	Andrew Ibrahim	Short film
2011	Anuvahood	Kenneth	Also writer and director
2011	Jack Falls	Hogan	
2011	Everywhere and Nowhere	Zaf	
2012	Victim	Zhartash	
2012	Payback Season	Jerome Davies	
2012	Outside Bet	Sam The Soleman	
2012	Comedown	Jason	
2014	Montana	Pitt	
2016	To Dream	Easy	
2018	The Bromley Boys	Herbie Lane	
2018	The Intent 2: The Come Up	Mustafa	
2019	Red Rage	Steve Dreamer	
2019	Built to Be	Mr. Lynch	Short film
2020	Break	Weasel	
2020	Rogue	Zalaam	
2020	Righteous Villains	Satan	
2020	Original Gangster	Remo	
2021	We're Too Good for This		Short film
2023	Boyz in the Wood	Rayan	
2023	Love Without Walls	Daniel The Cab Driver	
2023	Hitmen	Bob Black	
2023	Sumotherhood	Richard "Riko" Oshlam Byaseff Bulouck	Also writer and director

=== Television ===
Year	Title	Role	Notes
1998	Bill's New Frock	Rohan	Television film
2000	The Coral Island	Peterkin	Mini series
1991–2001	London's Burning	Boy 2 Kevin	2 episodes
2003	Spooks	Billy	Episode: "Clean Skin"
2003	A Touch of Frost	Darryl Stephens	Episode: "Another Life"
2003	Is Harry on the Boat?	Tyler	Episode: "Bad Karma"
2004	Wall of Silence	Aaron Cole	Television film
2004	Passer By	Youth 2	Television film
2005	Sugar Rush	Darren	Episode: #1.1
2005	The Ghost Squad	Rakesh Homaine	Episode: "One of Us"
2006	Brief Encounters	Prakesh Nair	Episode: "Hot or Not"
2003–2006	The Bill	Billy Aldridge KB	7 episodes
2007	Dubplate Drama	Bones	8 episodes
2007	Katy Brand's Big Ass Show	Himself	2 episodes
2008	Love Soup	Hooded Thief	Episode: "Smoke and Shadows"
2008	West 10 LDN	Nathan	Television film
2008	Dead Set	Space	5 episodes
2009	Gunrush	Jello	Television film
2009	Grownups		Episode: "Me, Me, Me"
2009	Being Human		Episode: "Bad Moon Rising"
2009	Criminal Justice		3 episodes
2010	Phone Shop	Paul Mohammed	Episode: "Doctor Who"
2011	The Boarding School Bomber	Andrew Ibrahim	Television film
2012	Celebrity Juice	Himself	2 episodes
2012	Britain Unzipped	Himself	Episode: "Emily Atack & Adam Deacon"
2012	Can We Trust the Police?	Himself	Narrator
2012	The Royal Bodyguard	Hart	Episode: "The Siege of Blenheim Square"
2012	Gates	Calvin	Episode: #1.4
2014	Inside No. 9	Si	Episode: "Last Gasp"
2014	BBC Comedy Feeds	Harry Swan Jimmy	Episode: "In Deep"
2014	Babylon	PC Robbie Vas	7 episodes
2016	Suspects	Ajam Kamar	Episode: "The Enemy Within (Part 1)"
2016	Dropperz	Flashman	Episode: "Bunny's Bitten It"
2006–2016	Casualty	Various	5 episodes
2021	Doctors	TK Nelson	Episode: "This is Not a Pipe"
2022	The Stand Up Sketch Show		2 episodes

=== Music videos ===
Year	Artist	Song	Role
2006	Plan B	"Bizness Woman"	Beatboxer
2009	Professor Green	"Before I Die"	Ambulance driver
2009	Professor Green	"Hard Night Out"	Drummer
2009	Bashy	"Who Wants To Be A Millionaire?"	Himself
2010	Chipmunk	"Chip Diddy Chip"	Himself
2012	Bashy	"London Town"	Himself
2012	Angel featuring Misha B	"Ride or Die" from Time After Time (Remixes) - EP	Group Therapy Attendee

== Discography ==
=== Singles ===
- "Keep Moving" (with Bashy, featuring Paloma Faith) (2010)
- "Hype Hype Ting" (with Boy Better Know and JME) (2011)
- "Do It" (featuring Professor Green) (2011)
- "People's Champion" (2012)
- "Flying High" (2012)
- '"Soldier" (2013)
