= Noel Clarke =

English actor and filmmaker (born 1975)

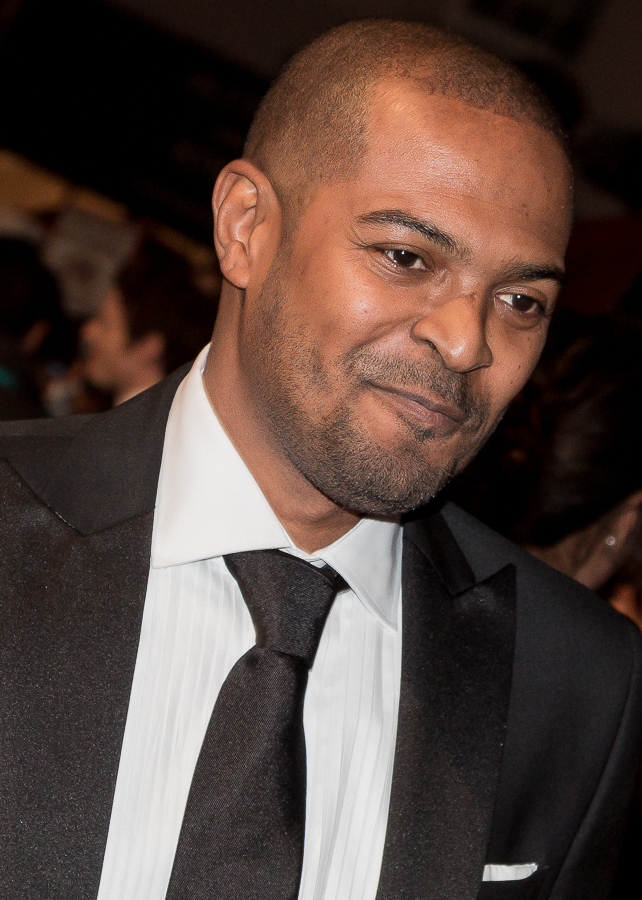
- Clarke at the BAFTA Film Awards 2015
- Born: Noel Anthony Clarke; 6 December 1975 (age 50); London, England
- Education: University of North London
- Occupations: Actor; writer; producer; director
- Years active: 1999–2021
- Spouse: Iris Da-Silva
- Children: 4

Noel Anthony Clarke (born 6 December 1975) is an English actor, writer, director, and producer. Rising to prominence for playing Mickey Smith in Doctor Who (2005–2006, 2008, 2010), he received critical acclaim for writing, directing, and starring in the teen crime drama films Kidulthood (2006), Adulthood (2008), and Brotherhood (2016). He has also either written, directed, produced or starred in the heist film 4.3.2.1. (2010), the sport drama Fast Girls (2012), and the sci-fi films Storage 24 (2012) and The Anomaly (2014). He co-created, co-wrote and starred alongside Ashley Walters in the Sky One action drama Bulletproof (2018–2021). His work in film and television has been praised for bringing the Black British working-class experience to the mainstream.

As an actor, Clarke made his film debut in I'll Sleep When I'm Dead (2003) and since has gone on to appear in films including Centurion (2010); Star Trek Into Darkness (2013); I Am Soldier (2014); I Kill Giants (2017); Mute (2018); 10x10 (2018); The Corrupted (2019); Twist (2021); and SAS: Red Notice (2021), some of which he also wrote, directed, or produced.

Following Kidulthood, Clarke founded the company Unstoppable Film and Television, which he ran with his friend and fellow actor Jason Maza, and they have written, directed, and starred in several productions. Clarke won numerous accolades, including the Laurence Olivier Award for Most Promising Performer in 2003 and the BAFTA Orange Rising Star Award in 2009, and received the BAFTA Outstanding British Contribution to Cinema Award in 2021.

In April 2021, twenty-six women raised allegations of verbal abuse, bullying, and sexual misconduct by Clarke. His BAFTA Outstanding British Contribution to Cinema Award, announced in March 2021, was suspended shortly afterwards, and not reinstated. In 2025, a High Court judgement in a libel case Clarke brought against The Guardian found that the allegations of sexual misconduct were "substantially true". In September 2026, Clarke was charged with several offences, including sexual assault, voyeurism and exposure.

== Early life and education ==
Noel Anthony Clarke was born on 6 December 1975 in Notting Hill, West London, to Trinidadian parents Gemma (née Clarke), a nurse and part-time laundrette worker, and Alphaeus Baptiste "Alf" Clarke, a carpenter. He has an older half-brother. His parents divorced shortly after he was born, and he was brought up by his mother on a council estate in Ladbroke Grove. In 2018, when appearing on the BBC genealogy series Who Do You Think You Are?, Clarke discovered that his maternal great-grandparents emigrated to Trinidad from Saint Vincent, while his paternal grandmother, Menelvia Clarke (née Bedeau), had emigrated there from Grenada.

Clarke studied media at the University of North London and worked as a personal trainer before taking acting classes at London's Actors Centre.

== Career ==
=== 2001–2005: Early career in television and stage ===
Clarke had recurring television roles as Wyman Norris in the revived series of Auf Wiedersehen, Pet (2002–2004) and as Mickey Smith in the first two series of the revival of the BBC science-fiction series Doctor Who (2005–2006). Starting with the episode "School Reunion", Mickey became a series regular for the remainder of the second series. Clarke also starred in the Doctor Who audio series Dalek Empire: The Fearless, which was released from September to December 2007. Clarke reprised his role as Mickey in "Journey's End" in 2008 and in "The End of Time" Part 2 in 2010.

Clarke's other television work includes appearances in Casualty and Metrosexuality. He also wrote "Combat", an episode of the Doctor Who spin-off series Torchwood (2006), and West 10 LDN (2008), a pilot for BBC Three about the intense lives of the teenagers who live on a West London housing estate.

Clarke has also acted on the stage, and won the Laurence Olivier Award for "Most Promising Newcomer" in 2003 for his performance in the play Where Do We Live at the Royal Court Theatre.

=== 2006–2012: Emerging success as actor and filmmaker ===
Clarke began his filmmaking career when he wrote the screenplay for the film Kidulthood, which depicted two days in the lives of a multi-ethnic group of West London teenagers, who are given the day off school after a bullied classmate's suicide. Clarke wrote the film based on his own experiences growing up in Ladbroke Grove, which he began developing with director Menhaj Huda and producer George Isaac. Made on a budget of £560,000, Kidulthood was released theatrically on 3 March 2006, earned £1,209,319 during the opening weekend of its release and received praise and some controversy for its depiction of teenage life in London.

In 2008, following the success of Kidulthood, Clarke was hired to write and star in Adulthood, where he also made his directoral debut. On directing his first film, Clarke described his experience: "Directing for the first time was definitely a challenge and tiring at times. It was a steep learning curve and if you're willing to do stuff and go with it, then it pays off." Adulthood grossed £1,203,319 during its UK opening weekend, with an overall gross of £6 million, becoming the second-highest grossing British film of 2008.

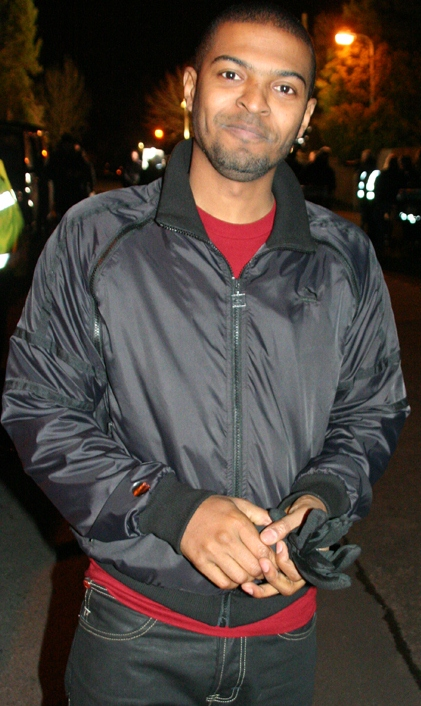
Clarke on the set of Doctor Who in 2008

In 2009, Clarke was awarded a BAFTA award in the category of Orange Rising Star Award. As a result of the success of Kidulthood, Adulthood, and his BAFTA win, he was ranked at number 83 in the MediaGuardian 100, an annual ranking of media people in The Guardian. In 2010, he signed a deal with Icon.

Following his BAFTA win, Clarke appeared in low-budget and commercially unsuccessful British films such as Heartless, Doghouse and Sex & Drugs & Rock & Roll (all 2009) and Centurion (2010).

In 2010, Clarke turned to mainstream films by writing and co-directing 4.3.2.1., a heist movie about four feisty girls who get caught up with a diamond theft heist, in which Clarke also appeared. 4.3.2.1. received generally negative reviews but was a decent box office success in the UK and overseas DVD sales.

Following 4.3.2.1., Clarke continued to either co-write or star in more mainstream British films, including Fast Girls, a sports film, and Storage 24, a science fiction-horror film.

=== 2013–2016: Continuing career ===
After an uncredited and deleted role in the 2012 Marvel Comics film Ghost Rider: Spirit of Vengeance, in 2013, Clarke played Thomas Harewood, a family man with a wife and a young daughter, in Star Trek Into Darkness. The film was released on 15 May 2013.

In 2015, Clarke created a short-lived superhero series, The Troop, for Titan Comics. The first issue was released in December 2015, and received critical acclaim.

Also in 2015, Clarke's former co-star Adam Deacon was banned by West London Magistrates' Court from contacting Clarke after Deacon was found guilty of nonviolent harassment due to sending a "barrage" of abusive social media messages. The pair reportedly fell out in 2010, and among the messages he sent, Deacon also accused Clarke of "bullying" him and "sabotaging" his career. Deacon had a history of treatment for mental illness.

After years of reluctance, in 2016, Clarke returned to write, direct, co-produce and star in Brotherhood, a sequel to Adulthood and the third and final instalment in his Hood Trilogy. The film was screened in the Special Presentations section at the 2016 Toronto International Film Festival and was released on 29 August 2016. It was a box-office success, earning £1.98m in its opening week.

=== 2018–2021: Venture into television ===
==== Bulletproof ====
In 2018, Clarke co-created, co-wrote and co-starred in the Sky One police procedural series Bulletproof, alongside Ashley Walters. The series follows NCA detectives, and best friends, Aaron Bishop (Clarke) and Ronnie Pike Jr. (Walters), who investigate some of the country's most dangerous criminals, including traffickers, drug dealers and armed robbers, while being overseen by their boss Sarah Tanner (Lindsey Coulson).

Inspired by the film Bad Boys, the series had been considered for development for several years. The first season of Bulletproof was broadcast on Sky One on 15 May 2018 to positive reviews and successful ratings. The series was followed by a second season consisting of seven episodes. In December 2019 Sky TV announced that the second series would air on 20 March 2020. Further, in August 2019 it was announced that a new three-part special would be broadcast in autumn 2020. The special began airing on 20 January 2021, with all episodes released for on-demand viewing. It sees Bishop and Pike journeying to South Africa to investigate the country's criminal underworld.

On 15 January 2021, five days before the third series premiered, Bulletproof was renewed for a fourth series. The series was set to consist of eight episodes; filming had been scheduled to begin later in the year. However, following allegations against Clarke in late April 2021 of sexual misconduct and bullying, filming was suspended, and makers Vertigo said they would investigate whether any of the allegations related to their productions. In May 2021, the series was officially cancelled by Sky One.

==== Viewpoint ====
In 2021, Clarke starred in and executive produced the ITV police procedural miniseries Viewpoint, which aired on ITV nightly from 26 April 2021. However, prior to the fourth episode's broadcast on 29 April, The Guardian reported that Clarke was the subject of allegations of sexual harassment and intimidation by 20 women, which he denied. Although the episode aired as planned, the finale of Viewpoint was withdrawn from its intended broadcast on 30 April, and was replaced by a new episode of It'll Be Alright on the Night. The final episode was instead released onto ITV's on-demand platform, ITV Hub (and STV Player), alongside previous episodes, for 48 hours. The episodes were streamed without advertisements.

==== Boarders and Crongton Knights ====
On 29 March 2021, it was announced that Clarke would be honoured at the British Academy Film Awards for Outstanding British Contribution to Cinema, to be presented on the weekend of 10 and 11 April.

In early 2021, Clarke was attached to two TV projects for the BBC: Crongton and Boarders. Both were transferred after allegations of sexual misconduct were published in The Guardian in April of that year.

== Allegations ==
On 29 April 2021, the British newspaper The Guardian published allegations by 20 women of verbal abuse, bullying, and sexual harassment by Clarke; by the following day, The Guardian had spoken to a further six women with allegations against Clarke. One of the accusations is that he filmed a nude audition by Jahannah James without her consent and showed it to a producer who worked for him. The same producer accused him of exposing his genitals to her in the back of a car and groping her in a lift the next day. The actress Jing Lusi, who appeared with Clarke in the film SAS: Red Notice, alleges that he sexually propositioned and threatened her. Other women allege that Clarke pressured them to perform sex scenes nude, and grew angry if they refused.

In response to the claims, BAFTA announced it was suspending both his membership and his Outstanding British Contribution to Cinema Award.

The following day, ITV announced that it would not broadcast the final episode of Viewpoint, in which Clarke starred, and international distribution of the series was suspended. Industry Entertainment declared they would no longer be representing Clarke, and Sky immediately halted his involvement in any future productions.

Clarke issued a statement through the PA news agency denying "any sexual misconduct or criminal wrongdoing" but conceding that one allegation was true, that he had repeatedly made remarks on the buttocks of an employee, Helen Atherton, who was art director on Brotherhood. The statement in full read: "In a 20-year career, I have put inclusivity and diversity at the forefront of my work and never had a complaint made against me. If anyone who has worked with me has ever felt uncomfortable or disrespected, I sincerely apologise. I vehemently deny any sexual misconduct or wrongdoing and intend to defend myself against these false allegations." Clarke apologised and said he was seeking professional help "to change for the better".

On 7 May 2021, Clarke was accused by five more women of sexual harassment on the set of Doctor Who and at a promotional event relating to the show. One of these accusations was made by an anonymous actress who said that Clarke "made advances on me" and asked her regularly if she wanted a piece of his "dark chocolate". She said that when she rejected his advances, Clarke defamed her to people in the industry. Clarke denied these allegations. Sky and production company Vertigo Films said they would no longer proceed with the fourth series of Bulletproof.

On 27 March 2022, the Metropolitan Police announced it had decided not to proceed investigating the sexual harassment claims against Clarke, stating: "Following a thorough assessment by specialist detectives it was determined the information would not meet the threshold for a criminal investigation." In September 2022, Clarke dropped the legal action he had taken against BAFTA following its suspension of his membership and honorary award.

=== Libel case ===
On 19 July 2023, it was reported that Clarke was taking High Court action to seek approximately £10 million in damages from Guardian News and Media (GNM), owner of The Guardian newspaper, over eight articles. The defamation lawsuit involved him claiming for reputational harm as well as special damages for specific financial losses.

The first stage of the High Court action took place on 26 October 2023. In November, Mr Justice Johnson ruled that The Guardian's reporting may be interpreted as defamatory, allowing Clarke to bring forward a libel case. However, Johnson also noted the prominent reporting of Clarke's denials and said the allegations against Clarke were "advanced in clear terms, and that there are features of the articles that lend credibility to the allegations that are made, most notably the sheer number of women who are said to have made similar complaints."

Following a pre-trial hearing on 20 January 2025, Mrs Justice Steyn rejected Clarke's attempt to dismiss GNM's defence of truth and public interest and refuted as baseless the claims of Clarke's legal team that The Guardian had fabricated evidence – a claim that Clarke's own barrister, Philip Williams, was unable to substantiate. The defamation and data protection trial began in March and lasted six weeks. Evidence of sexual propositioning by Clarke was given by the victims on behalf of GNM, including the recording and sharing of nude auditions without the actors' knowledge and filming of actors in positions of unacceptable exposure. The defence argued that the allegations in the articles were true, producing evidence from 28 witnesses who had been prepared to sign statements of misconduct by Clarke, and that publication of the articles was in the public interest. For the claimant, Williams countered that his client's accusers were lying and had embellished incidents. The trial concluded on 11 April 2025.

On 22 August 2025, the High Court ruled against Clarke in the libel claim. Mrs Justice Steyn found that The Guardian's reporting was substantially true and that publication was in the public interest. It also noted that Clarke was "not a credible or reliable witness". Clarke faced significant legal costs as a consequence. Reacting to the judgement, Clarke stated that "stories started via anonymous emails portraying me as a monster to attract attention and outrage. The goal was to damage my career, and they succeeded". The Guardian's editor-in-chief, Katharine Viner, welcomed the judgement, stating that it was "clear that our investigation was thorough and fair".

On 23 September 2025, Clarke was told by Mrs Justice Steyn at a costs hearing that he would have to make an interim payment of at least £3 million of The Guardian's legal bill within 28 days. A detailed assessment into the total amount due to The Guardian is due to be held, with the publisher's lawyers said to be estimating that the final bill could be more than £6 million. On 17 January 2026, it was reported that Clarke had been declared bankrupt.

=== Criminal investigation ===
On 25 September 2025, Clarke was arrested and his home was searched by the Metropolitan Police who left with documents and an electronic device. In February 2026, he was arrested on suspicion of attempted rape, exposure, and sexual assault by touching in 2007. He was also interviewed in relation to voyeurism allegedly committed in 2013.

On 9 September 2026, Clarke was charged by the Metropolitan Police with two counts of sexual assault, three charges of voyeurism, and one charge of exposure. The offences allegedly took place between 2007 and 2016 and relate to five women. Clarke appeared at Westminster Magistrates' Court on 21 October 2026, where he pleaded not guilty to the charges. Clarke’s trial was set for November 8, 2027.

== Personal life ==
Clarke is married to Iris Da-Silva, with whom he has four children.

== Performances and works ==
=== Film ===
Year	Title	Role	Notes	Ref.
2003	I'll Sleep When I'm Dead	Cyril	Film debut	
2006	Kidulthood	Sam Peel	Writer	
2008	Adulthood	Sam Peel	Writer and director	
2009	Heartless	AJ		
2009	Doghouse	Mikey		
2010	Sex & Drugs & Rock & Roll	Desmond / Sparky		
2010	Centurion	Macros		
2010	4.3.2.1.	Tee	Writer and co-director	
2010	Huge	Clark		
2011	Screwed	Truman		
2012	The Knot	Peter	Writer	
2012	Fast Girls	Tommy	Writer	
2012	Storage 24	Charlie	Writer	
2013	Star Trek Into Darkness	Thomas Harewood		
2013	Saving Santa	Snowy	Voice	
2014	I Am Soldier	Staff Sergeant Carter		
2014	The Anomaly	Ryan	Producer and director	
2015	The Throwaways	Erik Williamson		
2015	Scottish Mussel		Producer	
2016	The Habit of Beauty	Stuart		
2016	Brotherhood	Sam Peel	Writer and director	
2017	I Kill Giants	Mr Mollé		
2018	Mute	Stu		
2018	10x10	Dennis	Writer and producer	
2018	Songbird	Larry		
2019	Fisherman's Friends	Troy		
2019	The Corrupted	DS Neil Beckett		
2020	Bulletproof: The Interrogation	Aaron Bishop		
2021	Twist	Brownlow	Producer	
2021	SAS: Red Notice	Major Bisset		

=== Television ===
Year	Title	Role	Notes	Ref.
1999	Metrosexuality	Kwame O'Rielly		
2000	The Bill	Lennie Cox	Episode: "A Gathering Storm"	
2001	Judge John Deed	Adam	Episode: "Exacting Justice"	
2001	Waking the Dead	Harry	Episode: "A Simple Sacrifice Part One"	
2001	Casualty	Danny Oldfield	3 episodes	
2002–2004	Auf Wiedersehen, Pet	Wyman Norris	14 episodes	
2003	Adventure Inc.	Mike Reed	Episode: "Angel of St. Edmunds"	
2003	Doctors	Jim Baker	Episode: "A Civilised Arrangement"	
2004	Holby City	Shaun O'Connor	3 episodes	
2004	A Touch of Frost	Kenny	Episode: "The Buck Stops Here"	
2005–2006, 2008, 2010	Doctor Who	Mickey Smith/Ricky Smith	15 episodes	
2005–2010	Doctor Who Confidential	Himself	10 episodes	
2006	Tardisodes	MickeySmith/Ricky Smith	2 episodes	
2006	Jane Hall	Steve Heaney	2 episodes	
2007	Dubplate Drama	Hostel manager		
2008	West 10 LDN	Michael	Writer	
2012	What If	The Angel		
2014	The Assets	Mack	2 episodes	
2015	Chasing Shadows	DI Carl Prior	4 episodes	
2015	The Throwaways	Erik	4 episodes	
2016	The Level	Gunner Martin	6 episodes	
2017	Urban Myths	Muhammed Ali	Episode: "The Greatest. Of All Time."	
2017	Who Do You Think You Are?	Himself	1 episode	
2018	Inside No. 9	Gordon	Episode: "And the Winner Is..."	
2018–2021	Bulletproof	NCA Officer Aaron Bishop	Co-creator, 15 episodes	
2020	The Adventures of Paddington	PC Wells	Episode: "Paddington Finds a Pigeon"	
2021	Viewpoint	DC Martin King	5 episodes	

=== Short film ===
Year	Title	Role	Notes	Ref.
1999	Native	Victor		
1999	Take 2	Jamal / Cornelius		
2002	The Last Angel	Kid		
2002	Licks	David	Writer and producer	
2006	Plastic	Jock		
2009	Reign of Death	Joe Digby		
2012	What If	The Angel		
2018	My Butterfly	Nathan		

=== Music Videos ===
- 2008: The Prodigy - Invaders Must Die

=== Theatre ===
- 2003: Where Do We Live at the Jerwood Theatre Upstairs at the Royal Court

== Awards and nominations ==
Year	Award	Category	Work	Result	Ref.
2003	Laurence Olivier Awards	Most Promising Performer	Where Do We Live	Won	
2006	Dinard British Film Festival	Best Screenplay	Kidulthood	Won	
2009	BAFTA Awards	Rising Star Award		Won; withdrawn 2021	
2014	Edinburgh International Film Festival	Audience Award	The Anomaly	Nominated	
2017	National Film Awards UK	Action	Brotherhood	Won	
2017	National Film Awards UK	Best Director	Brotherhood	Nominated	
2017	Screen Nation Film and Television Awards	Achievement in Film Production	Brotherhood	Won	
2021	BAFTA Awards	Outstanding British Contribution to Cinema Award		Won; withdrawn soon afterwards	
