= The Knot (2012 film) =

- UK theatrical film poster
- Directed by: Jesse Lawrence
- Written by: Noel Clarke; Davie Fairbanks; Geoff Carino
- Produced by: Noel Clarke; Davie Fairbanks; Roslyn Hill
- Starring: Noel Clarke; Matthew McNulty; Talulah Riley; Mena Suvari
- Cinematography: Trevor Forrest
- Edited by: Tom Hemmings
- Music by: Adam Lewis
- Production companies: Unstoppable Entertainment; New Treatment; Beactive Entertainment
- Distributed by: Universal Pictures
- Release date: 5 October 2012 (United Kingdom)
- Running time: 92 minutes
- Country: United Kingdom
- Language: English
- Box office: $51,594

The Knot is a 2012 British romantic comedy film directed by Jesse Lawrence and starring Noel Clarke, Matthew McNulty, Talulah Riley and Mena Suvari. The film is about a couple who are going to get married, but they encounter a series of mishaps before their wedding day, which threatens to ruin their relationship. It was released by Universal Pictures in the United Kingdom on October 5, 2012.

== Cast ==
- Noel Clarke as Peter
- Matthew McNulty as Jeremy
- Talulah Riley as Alexandra
- Mena Suvari as Sarah
- Jason Maza as Ralphus
- Susannah Fielding as Julie
- Davie Fairbanks as Jack
- Rhoda Montemayor as Anisha
- Steve Furst as Voller
- Brett Goldstein as Albert
- Louise Dylan as Helen
- Juliet Oldfield as Mandy
- Vincenzo Nicoli as Mr. Fernandez
- Flaminia Cinque as Mrs. Fernandez
- Christopher Villiers as Mr. Giddings
- Liza Sadovy as Mrs. Giddings
- Steven Cree as Steve
- Catarina Wallenstein as Pollyanna
- Kojo as Ujay Utaka
- Junior Quartey as Sheldon

== Reception ==
The film received generally negative reviews from critics. On Rotten Tomatoes, it has an overall score of 0% based on reviews from 19 critics.
