= David Wicht =

South African film producer, writer and businessman

- Born: October 28, 1955 (age 70); Gqeberha, Union of South Africa
- Occupations: Film producer, writer

David Wicht (born 28 October 1955 in Gqeberha) is a South African film producer and writer who founded 'Film Afrika', a film production company.

== Early life and career ==
Born in Gqeberha, grew up in Robben Island, Saldanha Bay and Cape Town, Wicht returned to South Africa in 1994 to begin film production. According to him, it initially took time to "reassure the international film industry that it was safe to make films in South Africa".

Since then, he has been credited as a producer for Mandela and de Klerk, In My Country, The Breed (2006), Slipstream (2005), Dracula 3000,

== Awards ==
Wicht co-produced Mandela and de Klerk, Truth and Reconciliation Commission, and Inside (1996). Wicht has been documented in the British Film Catalogue's The Fiction Film, edited by Denis Gifford.

=== List ===
- 2004 Daytime Emmy Awards nominated for the Outstanding Children's Series, Scout's Safari.
- 2010 Chairman’s Award Imbongi Lifetime Achievement Award.

== Other ventures ==
Wicht is the founder/CEO of Film Afrika, a film production company based in Cape Town, South Africa. Film Afrika has co-produced films with BBC, French channel France 2, and Hallmark. He said it was challenging and those "years of persistent forging relationships with international producers and studios and overcoming skepticism about South Africa" later became his work. He served on the advisory panel of the Department of Arts and Culture and the Cape Film Commission.
