= Kidulthood =

2006 film directed by Menhaj Huda

- Directed by: Menhaj Huda
- Written by: Noel Clarke
- Produced by: Menhaj Huda; George Isaac; Damian Jones
- Starring: Aml Ameen; Noel Clarke; Red Madrell; Adam Deacon; Jaime Winstone; Femi Oyeniran; Madeleine Fairley; Cornell John; Kate Magowan; Pierre Mascolo; Rafe Spall
- Cinematography: Brian Tufano
- Edited by: Victoria Boydell
- Music by: The Angel
- Production companies: Stealth Films; Cipher Films; TMC Films
- Distributed by: Revolver Entertainment
- Release date: 3 March 2006
- Running time: 92 minutes
- Country: United Kingdom
- Language: English
- Box office: $849,650

Kidulthood (stylised as KiDULTHOOD) is a 2006 British teen crime drama film directed by Menhaj Huda from a screenplay by Noel Clarke. It stars Aml Ameen, Red Madrell, Adam Deacon, Jaime Winstone, Femi Oyeniran, Madeleine Fairley, Cornell John, Kate Magowan, Pierre Mascolo (who also acted as executive producer), Rafe Spall and Nicholas Hoult. Set in the West London area Ladbroke Grove, the film follows two days of in the lives of a diverse group of teenagers, who are given the day off school following a classmate’s suicide.

Clarke wrote the film between 1999 and 2000, inspired by his own upbringing and American films such as Boyz n the Hood (1991), Clerks (1994) and Kids (1995), and began developing with director Menhaj Huda and producer George Isaac between 2001 and 2003. Filming began on 14 November 2004 and was filmed on location until 16 December. The film explores themes, such as sex, drugs, bullying, violence, suicide, teenage pregnancy, gun control and racial issues. It also features breakout performances for Ameen, Clarke, Deacon, Winstone, Oyeniran, Spall and Hoult.

Made on a budget of £560,000, Kidulthood was released theatrically on 3 March 2006 and received praise and controversy for its depiction of teenage life in London. The success of the film led to two sequels: Adulthood (2008) and Brotherhood (2016), both of which were written and directed by Clarke.

== Plot ==
In 2002, at Ladbroke Grove, local school student Katie suffers intense physical and emotional bullying by a group of girls, as well as by another bully, Sam Peel. When her father picks her up from school that day, Sam quietly threatens to kill her if she ever tells anyone. That evening, Katie's older brother Lenny breaks into her room to discover that she has hanged herself.

The following morning, the students are informed of Katie's death and are given the day off to mourn. Trevor "Trife" Hector and his best friends, Jay and Moony, decide to spend it smoking weed and drinking alcohol. Trife's pregnant ex-girlfriend Alisa decides to spend the day with her best friend Becky.

Becky performs oral sex on an older man in return for drugs, and aggressively coaxes Alisa into joining in. The boys make their way to Sam's house on an estate to retrieve a Game Boy Sam had stolen from them the day before. Realising Sam is out, the boys also steal Sam's cannabis and Jay has sex with Sam's girlfriend Claire. Sam returns unexpectedly, but is beaten unconscious by the boys and they knock down Sam's mother as they flee.

Alisa and Becky unexpectedly run into some of Katie's bullies aboard a train. Alisa, feeling bad that she was not there for Katie, berates the girls for the suffering they caused. Becky accidentally reveals that Alisa is pregnant, information that the bullies threaten to spread around school in an effort to humiliate Alisa. At the next station, Alisa hurries off the train to vomit, whilst Becky scorns her for putting her life at risk. Having successfully sold the drugs they acquired earlier, they head to a shopping centre to buy dresses for a party later that evening, before meeting up with the boys. Jay, convinced by Trife that Alisa's baby is Sam's, falsely informs her that Trife wants nothing to do with her. Heartbroken, Alisa asks Becky if they can leave, but Becky insists on going to the party.

At the same time, Trife visits his uncle Curtis, who presents him with a revolver, the same one Trife had drilled the barrel for earlier at school. Downstairs, Andreas, a customer who earlier missed a drugs payment, is tied and beaten by Curtis and Trife. Curtis then orders Trife to carve a "C" into Andreas' face with a Stanley knife in order to test him. Though visibly terrified, Trife carries out his uncle's order, and flees the house traumatised. Trife desperately tries to call Alisa, but is unsuccessful in doing so. On her way home, Alisa runs into a classmate and persuades her to go to the party with her. At the party, Becky is stood up by Moony and fails to convince Jay to have sex with her.

Trevor interrupts Alisa and the other classmate who are kissing outside, and confesses his love for her. Alisa informs Trevor that the baby is definitely his – she had never slept with Sam. The two rekindle their love, but a vengeful Sam arrives at the party and attacks Trife. Alisa hurriedly tells Jay and Moony, who intervene to help Trife. Outside, Sam beats down both Trevor and Jay, whilst intimidating Moony into not interfering. Sam challenges all the other party goers who come out to watch, however Alisa, the only one unafraid of Sam, slaps him. When Sam grabs her by her hair, Trife gets to his feet and fights him to the ground. Alisa pleads with him to stop, and he ambles over to her. Sam takes this opportunity to grab his baseball bat, and delivers a critical blow to Trife's stomach.

As this occurs, Lenny arrives at the party; brandishing a gun, he forces Sam to the ground at gunpoint, and produces the note Katie wrote before she hanged herself. Lenny prepares to kill Sam but Trife stops him with his dying breath, telling him that Sam is not worth it. Sam is almost killed when he insults Lenny after the latter begins to walk away, however the gun fails to fire. Sirens are heard in the distance, so Lenny, his accomplice, and Sam all flee the party as Trife dies before the ambulance and police arrive.

== Cast ==
- Aml Ameen as Trevor 'Trife' Hector
- Red Madrell as Alisa
- Adam Deacon as Jay
- Noel Clarke as Sam Peel
- Jaime Winstone as Becky
- Femi Oyeniran as Moony
- Madeleine Fairley as Claire
- Cornell John as Curtis
- Rafe Spall as Lenny
- Nicholas Hoult as Blake
- Graham Page as Joe
- Rebecca Martin as Katie
- James Witherspoon as Kilpo
- Ortis Deley as Derek
- Stephanie Di Rubbo as Shaneek
- Kate Magowan as Stella

== Production ==
Following brief stints at his local West London sports centre as an athlete, gym instructor, waterslide attendant and lifeguard, Noel Clarke first came with the idea for Kidulthood, due to being rejected lead roles in films and TV shows and instead offered minor roles as the stereotypical black robber. He was also encouraged to write films about his own experiences by his mentor Rikki Beadle-Blair, who had given Clarke his first acting role in the Channel 4 television comedy drama series Metrosexuality (2001).

The script for Kidulthood was the fourth Clarke had ever written; the first two, Remembering Jessie and Society, were undeveloped and the third, the wedding-centric comedy The Knot, was later released in 2012. According to Clarke, a large majority of the film is an autobiographical depiction of him and his four friends growing up in Ladbroke Grove, West London, with the expection of the character of Uncle Curtis and the gun drilling, which was added later on.

Upon completing the script, Clarke initially showed the script to Blair and Timothy Spall (whose son, Rafe, was cast as Lenny, in the film), but when he showed it to Ray Panthaki, who played Mark in the film, he forwarded the script to Menhaj "Hoodz" Huda, who began helping Clarke develop and pitch the film. Despite production nearly collapsing and being rejected by studios for its promiscuous portrayal of British teenagers, the film received funding from producer George Isaac and filming finally began in November 2004, while Clarke was filming the first series of the 2005 revival of Doctor Who.

The film was principally shot in the actual areas in which it is set around London W11; for example, some of the school scenes are shot in Twyford CE High School in Acton, similarly Alisa and Becky's journey on the London Underground is between Ladbroke Grove and Royal Oak stations.

== Soundtrack ==
London hip-hop group Arcane wrote the title track for the film. The soundtrack drew on British hip hop and grime music including The Streets, Roots Manuva, Dizzee Rascal and Lethal Bizzle.

== Critical reception ==
Kidulthood has received a generally positive critical response. Writing in The Guardian, Miranda Sawyer called the film "a rollicking UK youth ride, cinematically filmed, persuasively acted and bumped along by a fantastic all-British soundtrack ... It's also very funny, laced with a humour of the slapped-in-the-face-with-a-kipper sort: you can't help laughing because it's so outrageous".

Stephen Armstrong in The Times, said "the only people who should be shocked by this film are people who have never been teenagers. What Kidulthood does is take all the violence, sex and intoxication experienced in a teenage year and condense it into a single day, because that's far more marketable than a film about eight kids spending four hours sitting on the swings wondering what to do". The Daily Mirror described it as being "as potent as a shot of vodka before breakfast – a harrowing, uncompromisingly bleak but thoughtful look at the anguish of being young and poor in Britain".

== Sequels ==
The film spawned a trilogy, receiving two sequels: Adulthood was released in 2008, which was written and also directed by Noel Clarke, and then Brotherhood in 2016.

== See also ==
- 4.3.2.1
- West 10 LDN
- Anuvahood
- Ill Manors
- List of hood films
