= Menhaj Huda =

Bangladesh-born British film and television director and film producer (born 1967)

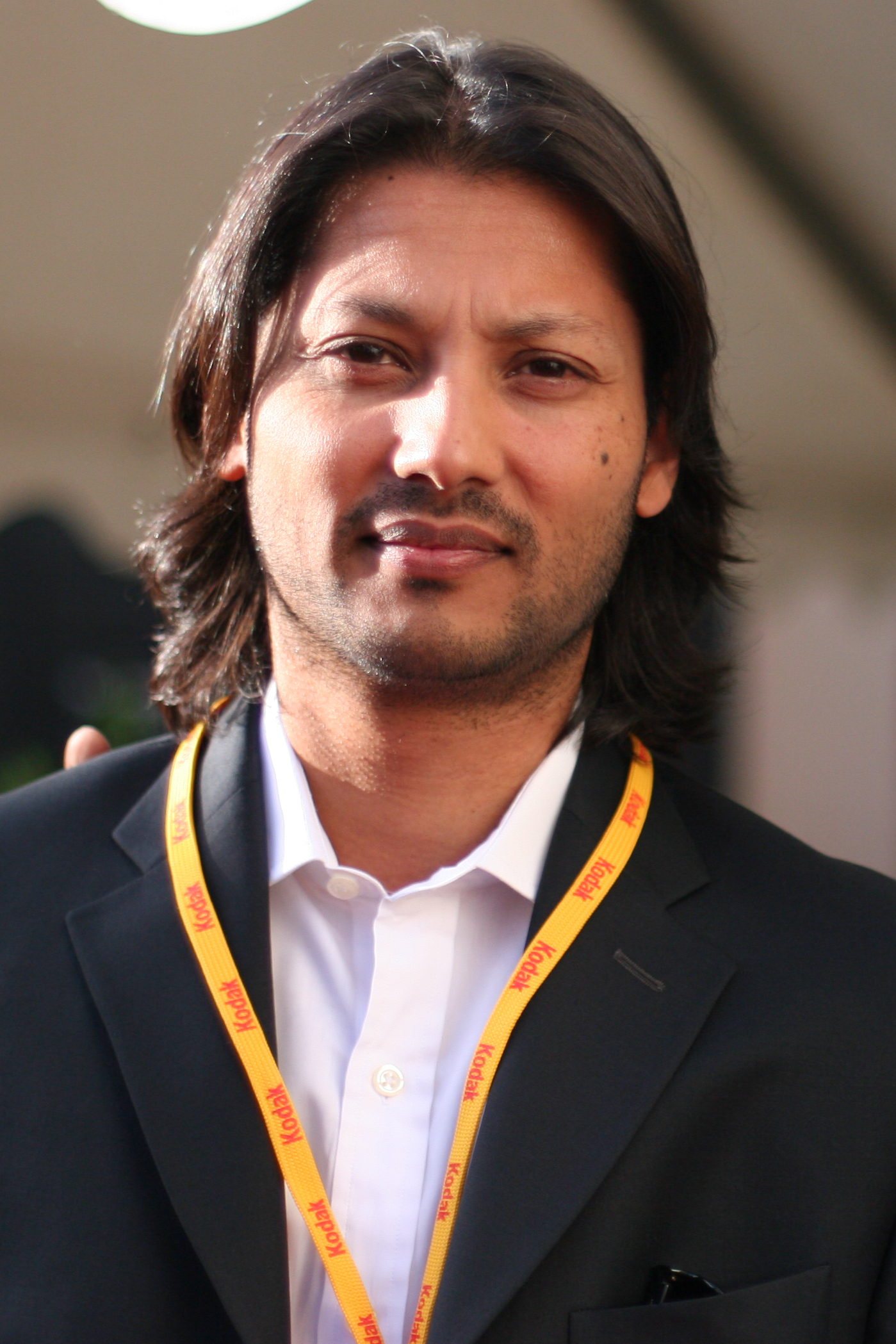
- Huda at the Dinard British film festival in France in October 2006
- Born: 20 March 1967 (age 59); Bangladesh
- Occupations: Film director, producer, screenwriter

Menhaj Huda (born 20 March 1967) is a Bangladesh-born British film and television director and producer best known for the film Kidulthood.

== Career ==
Huda's first directing job was the 1993 television series Hypnosis. He directed Jump Boy in 1999, which won an award for 'Best Feature Film' at the Mediawave awards.

Other directing credits include Queer as Folk 2, Is Harry on the Boat?, Murphy's Law, Murder in Mind, The Bill, Blue Murder and HolbyBlue.

Huda produced as well as directed Kidulthood and West 10 LDN, both written by Noel Clarke. Huda won the 'Douglas Hickox Award' at the 2006 British Independent Film Awards.

His horror film Comedown which stars Martin Compston, Adam Deacon, Geoff Bell, Red Madrell and Duane Henry, was filmed in 2010 in London. His "spiritual follow-up" to Kidulthood, Everywhere and Nowhere, based around the London DJ scene, was released in 2011.
