= Ashley Chin =

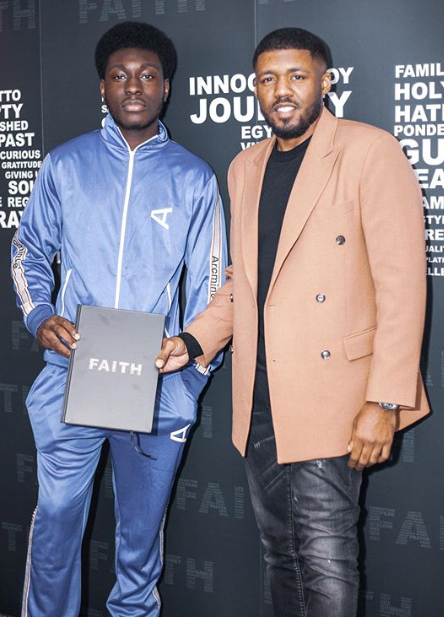
- Ashley Chin (right) with Hope Ikpoku at the launch of his book Faith in October 2019.
- Born: Ashley Anthony Chin; 21 August 1982 (age 44); London, England
- Other names: Muslim Belal; Smalls
- Occupations: Actor; Screenwriter; Rapper; Spoken word; Performance poet
- Years active: 1999–present
- Musical career
- Genres: Islamic; Hip-hop; Spoken word; Nasheed
- Instrument: Vocals
- Years active: 2005–present
- Label: Halal Dawa Records
- Website: www.shahaadahproductions.com

Ashley Anthony Chin (born 21 August 1982), also known by his stage name Muslim Belal, is an English actor, screenwriter, spoken word poet and rapper of Jamaican descent.

He began his acting career in the 1999 BBC film Storm Damage and his music career in 2005. He has acted in a number of stage productions including Gone Too Far! (2007). Chin came to prominence as a supporting role in the films Sket (2011) and Anuvahood (2011). He is perhaps best known for his role as Tyson in the film Victim (2011) and Michael in the award-winning short film The Boxer. Chin also played the role of the antagonist, G-Money, in The Intent (2016), and reprised his role in the prequel The Intent 2: The Come Up (2018). He played the role of Isaac in the short film series The Essence (2019). Chin has also released a book titled Faith in October 2019 and states that the book is based on his journey from the streets to Islam. A film based on the book is set to be released in 2022 and Chin is set to write and direct the film.

With music and poetry, Chin performs under his alias "Muslim Belal" and released his debut studio album, Pray Hard in 2009. He released his second album The Transition in 2010. His third studio album My Sumaya was released in 2015. Chin's poetry combines spiritualism with social issues and his own personal history. He also works as a life coach and delivers workshops and talks at youth clubs, universities and events.

== Early life and education ==
Chin was born in Gypsy Hill, London, England. His parents are from Jamaica. He was named after his paternal grandfather who was Chinese. He grew up with his mother, Andrea Ellis, and elder sister, Kareena Chin, in a South London council estate. He was brought up as a Christian. However, he spent his youth being involved in gang culture.

Chin achieved an A grade in GCSE drama and left school at the age of 15. In 1999, Chin and his family moved to Thornton Heath, Croydon.

Chin had a talent for poetry, which he started developing from the age of 12. In 2001, he and a friend set up a music studio, for a band, where Chin used to play keyboards and different sound boards. The former street gang and musical collective was called SMS 'South Man Syndicate' (later known as South Muslim Soldiers), and he was known at the time as Smalls.

== Career ==
=== 1999–2006: Beginnings ===
In 1999, Chin began his acting career in the BBC film Storm Damage directed by Lennie James. He then made his theatre debut as the role of Young Mal in Roy Williams' Lift Off at the Royal Court Theatre. Chin converted to Islam in 2002, during this time he stepped away from his career to focus on his faith. Since his conversion to Islam, Chin has adopted the name Muslim Belal. In December 2005, under this stage name, he performed at the inaugural Global Peace and Unity Event in the ExCeL Exhibition Centre organised by Islam Channel.

=== 2007–2009: Return to Acting and Pray Hard ===
Chin returned to acting in 2007, where he played Razer in Bola Agbaje's Laurence Olivier award-winning play Gone Too Far!. Laurence Olivier was impressed with Chin's performance that he made him reprise his role in 2008. He also played the role of Carl Wilkins in Roy Williams' There's Only One Wayne Matthews at the Polka Theatre. In August 2007, he played the role of Seales in BBC Radio 4's radio adaptation of E. R. Braithwaite's novel To Sir, With Love. Chin also starred in a supporting role in the television seriesThe Bill in 2007. He also had supporting roles inHolbyBlue, The Fixer, and Law & Order: UK during this time

In July 2008, Chin performed at the Islam Expo in Olympia, London. In February and March 2009, he toured with other Nasheed artists, including Mecca2Medina and Poetic Pilgrimage on the "I am Malcolm X Tour". In 2009, he released From the Streets to Islam, a CD in which he is being interviewed and responds to the questions by rapping. This was a preview to launching his first album. In the same month, a collaborative charity single "Feed the World, Feed the Fasting" was released by Muslim Aid. The song featured Chin along with artists Rizwan Hussain, Abdullah Rolle, Khaleel Muhammad, Labbayk and Mecca2Medina. In October and November 2009, he supported Shaam on their UK tour. Ashley Chin released his debut studio album Pray Hard on 15 August 2009 by Halal Dawa Records under his alias Muslim Belal. Chin's poetry combines spiritualism with social issues and his own personal history. The album features themes of repentance, his conversion to Islam, giving advice, praising Allah, preparations for the hereafter and supplicating to Allah.

=== 2010–2014: The Transition and Victim ===
In October 2010, he performed at the Global Peace and Unity Event, where he also launched his second album The Transition. The album had a guest appearance from Lowkey and was released on 23 October 2010. In February 2011, Ashley Chin took his talents to the United States and performed at the Saint Louis University Muslim Student Association Annual Conference. This performance was the first of its kind and developed an international audience.

In 2011, Chin co-wrote and starred in Victim in a lead role with Michael Maris. On 22 June 2012, the film was released in UK cinemas. The film also stars Ashley Madekwe, Jason Maza, and co-stars Adam Deacon, David Harewood and Giggs. The film is about a young man's attempts to move away from a life of violent crime, with the help of a wholesome country girl who comes to stay with his friend in the city, only to find himself the target of retaliation. Chin also had supporting roles in the shows Waking the Dead, Silent Witness and Casualty.

Chin had supporting roles in the 2011 films; Cherry Tree Lane and Anuvahood, and also a cameo in Sket. He was also selected as the 2010 Trailblazer at the Edinburgh International Film Festival for the role of Asad in Cherry Tree Lane. In April 2012, Chin co-starred in The Boxer, a seven-minute short film, alongside Paul Barber. The film was the winner for "Project 7" It was directed by Henry Blake, written by Daniel Bailey and produced by Scruffbag Productions. The film is about the relationship between a young man and his grandfather. It premiered on 17 April 2012 at the Lexi Cinema in Kensal Rise, London along with the runner-up of "Project 7", premiered during a special screening

From October to December 2012, he played the role of Escalante in Frank McGuinness's Damned By Despair, the English translated version of Tirso de Molina's 1625 play El Condenado por Desconfiado, at the Royal National Theatre. In October and November 2012, he was involved in filming of Destiny Ekaragha's adaptation of Bola Agbaje's play Gone Too Far.

From May to August 2013, he played the role of Mercutio in a National Theatre production of William Shakespeare's Romeo and Juliet in Ben Power's version for young audiences.

In November 2013, he performed at the Global Peace and Unity Event, where he launched his very best of compilation album Black Slave. He also played a supporting roles in Fedz and Starred Up during this time. Chin starred and wrote in Pressure. A short film released on Valentine's Day in 2014. It premiered through GRM Daily.

=== 2015–present: My Sumaya and Faith ===
Chin released third album My Sumaya on 19 May 2015. It is a charity album with all the proceeds going towards feeding the most vulnerable children in Eastern Sudan. The album was named after his daughter.

He starred in the 2016 film The Intent alongside Scorcher, Krept and Konan. He reprised his role in the 2018 prequel The Intent 2: The Come Up, released in 2018. The film also starred Ghetts and Popcaan. Chin also had a supporting role in EastEnders. Where he played the role of Sam in 2 episodes. After a year long hiatus from music, Chin released the single Life on 6 January 2019.

Chin worked with Giggs to write and release a short film in promotion of his album Wamp 2 Dem. The Essence is a short film that was released on 12 April 2019 on Giggs' YouTube channel that is inspired by the soundtrack of Wamp 2 Dem. It was written by Michael 'Buck' Maris, Ashley Chin and April Walker and directed by Myles Whittingham. Chin also played a lead role in the film and Giggs makes a cameo appearance. Chin worked with Giggs before for the film Victim.

Ashley Chin released an autobiography titled Faith in October 2019. Chin stated that he learnt more from travelling the world than he did from school. Saying that "I spoke about my life and changed peoples lives. Yesterday I was born, today I live, tomorrow I die. I put it all in a book for them to remember me by". The following month in November 2019, Chin announced that he is directing and writing a movie based on the book. It is a coming of age story about a South London boy who finds faith in Islam to escape gang life. He travels to Egypt to find his faith in life again but he must return to keep a commitment to his best friend's, fatherless daughter and face the past. It's a feature film based on the true story of Ashley Chins life. It follows the life of a young South London boy Ash, and his journey to finding the meaning in life and discovering the religion of Islam. It stars Hope Ikpoku, Keira Chansa and Fady Elsayed and is set to be released in 2022.

== Personal life ==
In 2002, at the age of 19, Chin converted to Islam. In 2004, he travelled to Egypt and lived there for a year to study Islam.

His mother and elder sister have also converted to Islam. He is a Manchester United Football Club fan.

In June 2010, Chin performed Umrah (the second largest Islamic pilgrimage to Mecca, Saudi Arabia). Between July 2011 to May 2012, Chin resided in Kuwait City, Kuwait.

In July 2013, he appeared on Channel 4's Ramadan Reflections. In February 2014, Chin set up a charity ABC Life. In June 2014, he visited Pakistan to deliver a lecture and record television interviews at Dreamworld Family Resort in Karachi.

== Filmography ==
=== Film ===
Year	Title	Role	Notes
2010	Cherry Tree Lane	Asad	Supporting role
2011	Sket	Titch	Supporting role
2011	Anuvahood	Mo	Supporting role
2011	Victim	Tyson	Lead role, writer and associate producer
2012	The Boxer	Michael	Lead role
2013	Fedz	Tyson	Supporting role
2013	Starred Up	Ryan	Supporting role
2013	Gone Too Far	Mark	Supporting role
2013	Plastic	Dion	Supporting role
2013	Snow in Paradise	Amjad	Supporting role
2014	Money and Grime	Valentine	Supporting role
2016	The Intent	G Money	Supporting role
2017	Refu G's – Minorities Not Welcome	Belal	Main role
2018	The Intent 2: The Come Up	G Money	Main role
2019	The Essence	Isaac	Lead role, also writer. Short YouTube film released by Giggs in promotion for his album.
2019	Run, Shaykh, Run!	Belal	Lead role. Short YouTube film for charity.
2022	Faith	No	Director, writer and producer.

=== Television ===
Year	Title	Role	Notes
2000	Storm Damage	Leon	TV film
2007	The Bill	Theo Sankara	1 episode: "#23.42: Code of Silence"
2008	HolbyBlue	Kwame Kwelo	1 episode: "#2.9"
2009	Law & Order: UK	Theo Carson	1 episode: "#2.1: Samaritan"
2009	The Fixer	B	2 episodes: "#2.1", "#2.2"
2010	The Bill	Jamal Carr	1 episode: "#26.29: Tombstone"
2011	Waking the Dead	Jakob Barclay	2 episodes: "#9:7: Conviction: Part 1", "#9:8: Conviction: Part 2"
2013	Silent Witness	Mark Benson	2 episodes: "#16:5: Trust: Part 1", "#16:6: Trust: Part 2"
2013	The Youth Show	Himself	2 episodes
2013	Ramadan Reflections	Himself	
2014	Casualty	Jason Lister	2 episodes: "#28:34: Games for Boys", "#28:37: When Nothing Else Matters"
2015	Venus vs. Mars	Sean	3 episodes: "The Break-Up", "The Set Up", "Social Network"
2018	EastEnders	Sam	2 episodes: "Episodes dated 21–22 October 2018 "

=== Stage ===
Year	Title	Role	Venue
1999	Lift Off	Young Mal	Royal Court Theatre
2007	Gone Too Far!	Razer	Royal Court Theatre
2007	There's Only One Wayne Matthews	Carl Wilkins	Polka Theatre
2008	Gone Too Far!	Razer	Royal Court Theatre / Hackney Empire Theatre
2009	Playsize	Various	Young Vic Theatre
2012	Damned By Despair	Escalante	Royal National Theatre
2013	Romeo and Juliet	Mercutio	Royal National Theatre

=== Radio ===
Year	Title	Role	Station
2007	To Sir, With Love	Seales	BBC Radio 4

== Discography ==
=== Albums ===
List of albums, with selected details
Title	Album details
From the Streets to Islam	Released: 2009; Label: Halal Dawa Records; Formats: CD
Pray Hard	Released: 19 June 2009 and Re-Released 15 August 2009; Label: Halal Dawa Records; Formats: CD, Digital download
The Transition	Released: 23 October 2010; Label: Halal Dawa Records; Formats: CD, Digital download
My Sumaya	Released: 19 May 2015; Label: Halal Dawa Records; Formats: Digital download
Hearts Are More Attractive Than Faces	Released: 26 June 2017; Label: ABC Fashion; Formats: CD, Digital download

=== Non-album tracks ===
Year	Title	Artist(s)	Writer(s)	Label(s)	Note(s)
2009	Feed the World, Feed the Fasting	Rizwan Hussain, Abdullah Rolle, Muslim Belal, Khaleel Muhammad, Mecca2Medina & Labbayk	Rizwan Hussain, Muslim Belal & Khaleel Muhammad	Muslim Aid	
2011	You Can Do Better	Muslim Belal, Samir Al-Bashiri	Muslim Belal, Samir Al-Bashiri	The Dawah Records	
2014	Song4Syria/You're Not Alone	Ajmal Masroor, Abdullah Rolle, Faisal Salah, Omar Esa, Khaleel Muhammad, Hassen Rasool, Muslim Belal, Abdul Wahab, Umar Salaams & Masikah	Ajmal Masroor, Abdullah Rolle, Faisal Salah, Omar Esa, Khaleel Muhammad, Hassen Rasool, Muslim Belal, Abdul Wahab, Umar Salaams & Masikah	ChildrenPlus	
2015	Past and Present	Castillo, Muslim Belal	Muslim Belal	MercifulServant	
2016	Dawah	Omar Esa, Muslim Belal	Omar Esa, Muslim Belal	Hasan Sarwar	
2017	Rise Up	Ilyas Mao, Muslim Belal & Boonaa Mohammed	Muslim Belal & Boonaa Mohammed		From the album Maktoob
2018	The Corner	Muslim Belal, Essam Muhammad	Muslim Belal, Essam Muhammad		
2018	United Ummah	Omar Esa, Muslim Belal	Omar Esa, Muslim Belal		
2019	Life	Muslim Belal	Muslim Belal		
2019	Where is the Love	Talk Islam, Muslim Belal, Omar Esa & Essam Muhammad	Talk Islam, Muslim Belal, Omar Esa & Essam Muhammad	OnePath Network	
2019	Answers	Imad, Muslim Belal & Yarimi	Imad, Muslim Belal & Yarimi		Grenfell Tower fire
2019	Climbing The Mountain Before You	Muslim Belal, Ilyas Mao	Aliyah Umm Raiyan	Ummah Grafiks	
2020	Signs	Muslim Belal	Muslim Belal	iERA	
2020	Traveller Remix	Muslim Belal	Muslim Belal	Ramadhan Giving (Give Brite)	

== See also ==
- British hip hop
- Islamic music
- List of converts to Islam
- List of performance poets
