= Michelle Greenidge =

British actress

- Born: Michelle Denise Greenidge; 15 June 1969 (age 57); Bradford, West Yorkshire, England
- Occupation: Actress
- Years active: 2009–present

Michelle Denise Greenidge (born 15 June 1969) is a British actress. She is known for portraying the roles of Valerie in the Netflix comedy drama After Life (2019–2022), Lola Okonedo Akimbo in the BBC Two comedy Mandy (2020–present), PC Williams in the police comedy drama Code 404 (2020–2021), Rosa Babatunde in the Channel 4 drama It's a Sin (2021), Carla Sunday in the BBC sci-fi series Doctor Who (2023–2025) and MP Sarah Bryon in the BBC Radio 4 soap opera The Archers (2024).

== Early life ==
Greenidge was born on 15 June 1969 in Bradford, West Yorkshire. She is of Jamaican descent. Before becoming famous she worked for Southwark council for 20 years.

== Career ==
Greenidge began her acting career in 2009 in the short film Leave, where she played the role of Claire. Her next role came in 2013 as the mother in the short film Sorry We Don't Help Darkies. In 2014, she portrayed Auntie Jeanie in an episode of the comedy series All About the McKenzies and the same year went on to appear in various short films, Crude, Samuell Benta's Perceptions and Daddy's Girl. In 2015, she played Councillor Gretel in four episodes of the Sky Living comedy drama Venus vs. Mars. Greenidge's first film role came in 2016 when she appeared as Ms. Vincent in the crime-thriller film The Intent. She reprised the role for the sequel The Intent 2: The Come Up in 2018.

In 2019, Greenidge began portraying the role of receptionist Valerie in the Netflix black-comedy drama After Life. She appeared in all three series of show. Since 2020, she has starred in Diane Morgan's BBC Two comedy Mandy as Lola Okonedo Akimbo, nail technician and best friend to the titular character. Between 2020 and 2021, she played PC Williams in the police comedy drama Code 404. She also played Mrs. Manning in Mangrove, the first film in the anthology series Small Axe. In 2021, she played Rosa Babatunde in the Channel 4 drama It's a Sin.

Greenidge has also had minor and guest roles in Doctors, Casualty, Timewasters and King Gary. She has also worked in theatre with some of her credits including Ear for Eye, At the Feet of Jesus, Super Skinny Bitches, House, All Saints, Stopcock, Do You Pray?, The Distance Between Us, People Who Need People, The House They Grew Up In and Omega Time.

On 20 January 2023, it was announced that Greenidge would be guest starring in the fourteenth series of Doctor Who. Her casting was announced alongside Anita Dobson.

== Filmography ==
| Year | Title | Role | Notes |
|---|---|---|---|
| 2009 | Leave | Claire | Short film |
| 2013 | Sorry We Don't Help Darkies | Mother | Short film |
| 2014 | All About the McKenzies | Receptionist | Episode: "Do What You Gotta Do So That You Can Do What You Wanna Do!" |
| 2014 | Crude | Aisha | Short film |
| 2014 | Samuell Benta's Perceptions | Dorothy | Short film |
| 2014 | Daddy's Girl | Mum | Short film |
| 2015 | Venus vs. Mars | Councillor Gretel | 4 episodes |
| 2015 | Red Room | Doctor | Short film |
| 2015 | A Lesson Learnt | Train Station Woman | Series 1; episode 1 |
| 2016 | The Intent | Ms. Vincent | Debut film role |
| 2016 | Class 15 | Mary | Short film; voice role |
| 2016 | The Way I Die | Mother | Short film |
| 2017 | Nadia | Linda | Short film |
| 2017 | Casualty | Prison guard | Episode: "Slipping Under" |
| 2017 | Intruders | Tonya Bell | Episode: "The Walls Have Eyes" |
| 2018 | The Right Choice | Advisor | Short film |
| 2018 | Doctors | Sandra Fleming | Episode: "A Mother's Love" |
| 2018 | The Intent 2: The Come Up | Ms. Vincent | Film |
| 2019–2022 | After Life | Valerie | Series regular |
| 2019 | Timewasters | Maggie | Episode: "By Any Means Necessary" |
| 2019 | Casualty | Gail Carrow | Guest role |
| 2019 | Freeze Me | Nurse | Short film |
| 2020–2021 | Code 404 | PC Williams/Judith Papastathopoulos | Series regular |
| 2020 | I May Destroy You | Grace | Episode: "The Cause the Cure" |
| 2020–present | Mandy | Lola Okonedo Akimbo | Series regular |
| 2020 | Semi-Detached | Police officer | Series 1; episode 3 |
| 2020 | Small Axe | Mrs. Manning | Episode: "Mangrove" |
| 2020 | Adult Material | Denise | Episode: "Hayley" |
| 2020 | The Loss Adjuster | Purdy | Film |
| 2021 | It's a Sin | Rosa Babatunde | 3 episodes |
| 2021 | King Gary | Mrs. Grant | Episode: "Prodigy" |
| 2021 | Venom: Let There Be Carnage | Mugging victim | Film |
| 2021 | The Art of Love | Libby | Film |
| 2021 | Grantchester | Ruby Daltrey | Series 6; episode 8 |
| 2021 | Alex Rider | Maisie | Episode: "Mirror" |
| 2021 | Split Sole | | Short film |
| 2022 | The Witchfinder | Landlady | Guest role |
| 2023 | My Happy Ending | Nurse Emilia | Film |
| 2023–2025 | Doctor Who | Carla Sunday | Series 14 and 15 |
| 2024 | Kaos | The Tacita | 6 episodes |
| 2024 | Cunk on Life | Jacqui Flink | Television special |
| 2025 | The Diplomat | Suzanne Hotchkiss | Episode: "Birdwatchers" |
| 2026 | Project Hail Mary | Chimamanda | Film |
| 2026 | Ann Droid | Nurse Brianna Powell | Series 1 |
