= Richie Campbell (actor) =

British actor

- Born: 8 February 1983 (age 43); Hackney, London, England
- Occupation: Actor
- Years active: 2006–present
- Spouse: Claire Campbell (m. 2019)
- Children: 2

Richard Campbell (born 8 February 1983) is a British actor.

== Career ==
He is best known for his comedic turn as local bully "Tyrone" in British film Anuvahood and his role of Ndale Kayuni in Waterloo Road.

Campbell has won a Screen Nation Award for his portrayal of Dominic Hardy in TV show The Bill.

His work has included Breathless, Mid Morning Matters with Alan Partridge, and recurring roles in The Silence and Channel 4 drama Top Boy. As a film actor, Campbell has appeared in Wilderness, The Plague, The Firm, Victim, Fast Girls, and Get Lucky. In addition, Campbell has done extensive work in West End theatre including, Dirty Butterfly at Young Vic Theatre, Lower Ninth at the Donmar Warehouse, Truth and Reconciliation at Royal Court Theatre and in 2013 playing Tom Robinson alongside Robert Sean Leonard as Atticus Fitch in To Kill A Mockingbird at Regents Park Open Air Theatre.

== Filmography ==
=== Film ===
Year	Title	Role	Notes
2006	Wilderness	Jethro	
2006	The Plague	Eddie	
2009	The Firm	Snowy	
2011	Anuvahood	Tyrone	
2011	Victim	Joseph	
2011	Sket	Ruds	
2011	Yesterday's Tomorrow	Darren	Short film
2011	The Pick Up	Baastian	
2012	Illegal Activity	Steven	Short film
2012	Fast Girls	Daze	
2013	Fedz	Barry	
2013	Get Lucky	Brown George	
2014	Montana	Isaac	
2015	Anti-Social	Dominic	
2016	The Intent	Gunz's Dad	
2016	Gangsters Gamblers Geezers	Josh	
2017	Nadia	Mr. Anthony Green	Short film
2017	The Last Photograph	Policeman	
2018	Tango One	The African	
2018	Thomas & Friends: Big World! Big Adventures!	African Troublesome Trucks; Various African characters (voices)	UK/US versions
2019	Blue Story	Tyrone	
2023	Sumotherhood	Theodore "Tyreese" DeMarco	

=== Television ===
Year	Title	Role	Notes
2006–2007	The Bill	Dominic Hardy	12 episodes
2008	Holby City	Sticks Hughes	Episode: "The Key Is Fear"
2011	Pixelface	Football Captain	Episode: "Rex on the Bench"
2013	Waterloo Road	Ndale Kayuni	7 episodes
2015	DCI Banks	Liam Fallon	Episodes: "Ghosts: Parts 1 & 2"
2015–2016	Eve	Viv Watson	11 episodes
2015	Casualty	Russell French	Episode: "Best Served Cold"
2015–2017	The Frankenstein Chronicles	Sergeant Joseph Nightingale	11 episodes
2015	Harry Price: Ghost Hunter	Albert Ogoro	Television movie
2016	Mid Morning Matters with Alan Partridge	Julius Scannell	Episode: "Blackbird + Gangster"
2017–2020	Liar	Liam Sutcliffe	Main cast
2018	Death in Paradise	Dashel Jordan	Episode: "The Healer"
2018–present	Thomas & Friends	Various voices (voice)	UK/US versions
2019	Wisting	FBI Special Agent John Bantham	
2021–present	Grace	Detective Sergeant Glenn Branson	Main cast

=== Video games ===
Year	Title	Role	Notes
2011	Brink	Security (voice)	
2014	Alien: Isolation	Ricardo (voice)	
2017	Nioh	Yasuke (voice)	
2017	Stories Untold	Dr. Williams, NS1, Officer Williams (voices)	
2017	Lego Marvel Super Heroes 2	Additional Voices (voice)	
2026	Resident Evil Requiem	Nathan Dempsy (voice)	
