= Rakin Fetuga =

Rapper and music producer

- Also known as: Trim; Rakin da Authordox; Rakin Misbah; Rakin Niass
- Born: Rakin Misbah Adetola Fetuga; 21 January 1971 (age 55); Ladbroke Grove, Kensington and Chelsea, London, England
- Origin: Kilburn, London, England
- Genres: Islamic; hip hop; Nasheed
- Occupations: Rapper; music producer; School mentor; television presenter
- Instrument: Vocals
- Years active: 1985–present
- Label: Crescent Moon Media
- Website: www.rakinniass.co.uk www.saveourboys.co.uk

Rakin Misbah Adetola Fetuga (born 21 January 1971) is an English rapper and music producer of Nigerian descent.

== Early life ==
Fetuga was born in Ladbroke Grove, London, England. His parents, both Nigerian, came to the United Kingdom in the 1960s to further their education. His Muslim father was an accountant, while his mother was a Christian working for the London Transport. When Fetuga was a teenager his parents separated, and in his mother's care he was brought up as a Christian. Through his early life, he has been Catholic, Jehovah's Witness and Methodist.

== Career ==
In 1985, Fetuga and his childhood friends formed Cash Crew, he left Holland Park School before his A-levels when they were signed to Virgin Records and BMG France. He was a DJ, producer, breakdancer and graffiti artist as well as a rapper, known at the time as Rakin da Authordox aka Trim. Fetuga converted to Islam along with the others members. and in 1992, the group recorded the first ever Islamic rap song "The Provider". In 1995, Fetuga left the group.

Fetuga then studied Islam under the guidance of Shaykh Ahmed Ba'biker Abu Bakr As-Sudani who encouraged him to use rap for da'wah (inviting others to Islam) and to continue using his musical talents to make Islamic music. In 1996, he formed the group Mecca2Medina. In 1999, he graduated with a BSc in Sociology from the University of Roehampton and then started voluntary work before being recruited to train as a mentor.

As well as recording and performing, Fetuga has also presented programmes such as the Global Peace and Unity Event Nasheed Contest for Islam Channel in 2008. He has co-hosted and managed the urban stages at the Islam Expo in Olympia and the Global Peace and Unity Event in ExCeL Exhibition Centre.

In September 2010, Fetuga released a solo album The Road Less Travelled credited to the stage name "Rakin Niass", featuring other hip hop artists, including Poetic Pilgrimage.

Fetuga is the CEO of Crescent Moon Media record label. He runs workshops to support youth, teaches Religious studies at Oasis Academy Hadley. He also teaches Islamic studies at the weekends, and is also life coach. Fetuga's latest initiative is to bring awareness to the epidemic of youth violence in the inner cities. He formed an organisation called 'Save Our Boys' which holds events in the community and in schools. He is also part of the Rumi's Cave team working as a teacher, events host, speaker and Imam for Friday congregational prayers and Ramadan taraweer prayers.

== Personal life ==
Fetuga is a muqaddam (student) of the Tijaniyyah Sufi order. He now lives in Kilburn, London with his wife, Adwoa-Amina Elsie Ofori, and four children.

== Discography ==
=== The Road Less Travelled (2011) ===
The Road Less Travelled

Studio album by Rakin Niass
- Released: 10 September 2010
- Genre: Hip hop
- Length: 35:52
- Label: Crescent Moon Media

==== Track listing ====
No.	Title	Length
1.	"The Road Less Travelled"	05:37
2.	"Mothers"	02:23
3.	"What You Looking At?"	01:54
4.	"Revolutionary Rap"	03:06
5.	"New World Order"	03:56
6.	"The Pen"	04:38
7.	"Interlude: Malcolm Speaks"	00:42
8.	"Malcolm X"	01:54
9.	"Blackberry"	04:51
10.	"Public Enemy"	03:46
11.	"Escapism"	03:49
12.	"Racism"	03:11
13.	"Samuri Tongues"	02:55
14.	"Music Therapy"	03:10
Total length:		35:52

=== Clarity (2011) ===
Clarity

Studio album by Rakin Niass
- Released: 9 December 2011
- Genre: Hip hop
- Length: 24:50
- Label: Crescent Moon Media

==== Track listing ====
No.	Title	Length
1.	"Clarity" (featuring Samiyah)	03:39
2.	"I Love Her" (featuring Joel Culpepper)	03:08
3.	"One"	02:50
4.	"Niassness"	03:20
5.	"Sold Soul" (featuring Samiyah, 580 and Nate)	03:48
6.	"Ummah" (featuring Tijani Conscious, and Muneera from Poetic Pilgrimage)	04:17
7.	"Baye Niass" (featuring Ousmane Thiam)	03:48
Total length:		24:50

Date	Title	Format	Featuring
10 September 2010	The Road Less Travelled	Album	Mohammed Yahya, Poetic Pilgrimage, John Graham, Tyson Amir, Nomadic Poet, Iron Braidz, Ismael Lea South, Dawud Sayfulah, Chuks
8 December 2010	"New World Order"	Single	Mohammed Yahya
9 December 2011	The Clarity EP	EP	Samiyah

== See also ==
- Black British
- British Nigerian
- British hip hop
- List of converts to Islam
- Islamic music
- Nasheed
