= Storm Damage =

2000 British television film

- Title card
- Genre: Drama
- Written by: Lennie James
- Directed by: Simon Cellan Jones
- Starring: Adrian Lester; Mona Hammond; Kate Ashfield
- Theme music composer: Chris Whitten
- Country of origin: United Kingdom
- Original language: English

Production
- Producer: Ian Madden
- Cinematography: Nicholas D. Knowland
- Editor: Kristina Hetherington
- Running time: 95 minutes
- Production company: BBC Films

Original release
- Network: BBC Two
- Release: 23 January 2000

Storm Damage is a 2000 British television drama film directed by Simon Cellan Jones, written by Lennie James, and stars Adrian Lester, Mona Hammond and Kate Ashfield. The film is about a young teacher who returns to the children's care home where he grew up, and becomes involved with the lives of the troubled teenage children. It was broadcast by BBC Two on 23 January 2000.

== Plot ==
Danny (Adrian Lester) is an English teacher in a South London comprehensive. When three youths break into his class and threaten one of his pupils, Patrick "Shinehead" (Alexis Rodney), Danny intervenes and is himself threatened with a knife before the youths leave. A shaken Danny confronts Patrick and demands that he tells him the name of the ringleader.

Danny discovers that the 16-year-old boy, Stefan Ortiz (Ashley Walters), lives at the care home known as Number 66, where he himself spent much of his youth. He visits the home and is welcomed by his former foster mother Agnes Miller (Mona Hammond), who runs the home. He confronts Stefan and is shocked and infuriated by the boy's unruly and hostile attitude.

Danny becomes increasingly obsessed with Stefan and visits the home frequently. Eventually, he resigns his teaching job and takes a job at the home, but his hot-headed and sometimes confrontational approach does not go down well with some of Number 66's troubled children, particularly Stefan. At the same time, Danny begins an affair with Kay (Kate Ashfield), another worker at the home.

Meanwhile, Stefan has fallen under the control of Steven Bonaface (Lennie James), a local gangster, and is being drawn deeper into a life of petty crime. On Christmas Day Stefan burgles his mother's house.

At a New Year's Eve party, one of the girls at Number 66, Annalise (Ashley Madekwe), overdoses on solvents. Her friend, Melody (Nicole Charles), is persuaded to leave Annalise by her boyfriend Shinehead, and Annalise subsequently dies in hospital. Later, Stefan blames Shinehead and vows revenge.

Stefan, on the run from the police, leaves Number 66 to hide out at the home of Rosa (Anastasia Hille), Annalise's mother, a drug addict. Some days later, Danny comes upon a confrontation between Stefan and Shinehead. When Shinehead pulls a knife on Stefan, Danny intervenes and Shinehead leaves. Back at Number 66, Stefan fights with his best friend from Number 66, Paul (Roland Manookian), over a stolen jacket. Stefan runs off and Danny follows him and confronts him with Bonaface. Stefan is defiant and Danny leaves. However, a furious Stefan follows Danny back to Number 66. In his anger Stefan ransacks the kitchen, throwing anything he can find at Danny until he finally breaks down in tears. Danny comforts him.

Later, Stefan, who seems to have ended his hostilities with Danny, is out in an amusement arcade with Paul and Milton MacDaddy (another child from Number 66) when they are confronted by Shinehead and his gang. Stefan is stabbed repeatedly by Shinehead.

At Stefan's funeral the preacher, Mister (T-Bone Wilson), begs the young people to value themselves and their lives.

== Cast ==
- Adrian Lester as Danny
- Mona Hammond as Agnes
- Kate Ashfield as Kay
- Ashley Walters as Stefan
- Lennie James as Bonaface
- Jackie Williams as Massive
- Roland Manookian as Paul
- Ashley Madekwe as Annalise
- T-Bone Wilson as Mister
- Victor Romero Evans as Elias
- Daryl McCollin as MacDaddy
- Nicole Charles as Melody
- Ashley Chin as Leon
- Tara Keatley as Celia
- Alexis Rodney as Shinehead
- Cecilia Noble as Cynthia
- Anastasia Hille as Rosa

== Production ==
The film was written by actor Lennie James and was closely based on his own experiences. James was fostered after spending some time in a council-run home following the death of his mother. His foster mother subsequently set up a children's home, and James helped out while training to be an actor, but found it difficult.

== Reception ==
Stephen Bourne in his 2001 book Black in the British Frame: The Black Experience in British Film and Television said, "Storm Damage proved to be the best film or television drama written about the displacement and alienation of Britain's black working-class youth since Horace Ové's film Pressure."

== Awards and nominations ==
| Year | Award | Category | Recipient(s) | Result |
|---|---|---|---|---|
| 2001 | British Academy Television Awards | Best Single Drama | Ian Madden, Simon Cellan Jones, Lennie James | Nominated |
| 2001 | Royal Television Society Awards | Best Single Drama | BBC | Won |

== See also ==
- BBC television drama
- Black British
- Adulthood
- Bullet Boy
- Kidulthood
