= Bullet Boy (soundtrack) =

Soundtrack album by Robert Del Naja
- Released: 2004

Bullet Boy by Robert Del Naja and Neil Davidge of Massive Attack is the soundtrack to the film, directed by Saul Dibb.

== Track listing ==
1. "Brave New World And Score" – 28:58
2. "Bullet Boy (Vox)" – 4:08
