= Pray Hard (album) =

- Artwork by Kazi Designs

Studio album by Muslim Belal
- Released: 15 August 2009
- Recorded: 2009 at IDeen Media Studio in London, England
- Genre: Islamic; Nasheed; hip hop; spoken word
- Length: 39:35
- Language: English; Arabic; Sylheti Bengali; Jamaican Patois
- Label: Halal Dawa Records
- Producer: Jamie Renwick

Muslim Belal chronology
From the Streets to Islam (2009)	Pray Hard (2009)	The Transition (2010)

Pray Hard is the debut studio album by Muslim Belal, released on 15 August 2009 by Halal Dawa Records.

== Composition and release ==
In early 2009, Belal released From the Streets to Islam, a CD in which he is being interviewed and responds to the questions by rapping, this was a preview to launching his first album. Pray Hard was released by Halal Dawa Records on 15 August 2009 at the Oxford House Theatre in Bethnal Green, London.

Belal's poetry combines spiritualism with social issues and his own personal history. The album features themes of repentance, his conversion to Islam, giving advice, praising Allah, preparations for the hereafter and supplicating to Allah.

== Track listing ==
No.	Title	Length
1.	"Intro" (Abdullah Rolle) (English)	0:36
2.	"Pray Hard" (English, Arabic)	2:23
3.	"Cold Outside" (featuring Abdullah Rolle) (English, Arabic)	1:55
4.	"Salam Salam Salam" (English, Arabic)	1:37
5.	"Forgive Me Please" (Mahdud) (Sylheti Bengali)	0:26
6.	"Gunz n’ Roses" (featuring Abdullah Rolle) (English)	2:47
7.	"From the Streets to Islam" (featuring Abdullah Rolle) (English, Arabic)	3:40
8.	"Ya Khaliq" (featuring Kazi Md Abidur Rahman) (Arabic, English)	2:50
9.	"Goodbye Yesterday" (English)	2:59
10.	"Muslim Boy" (featuring R U Kid) (English)	2:34
11.	"Prayer Is My Weapon" (English)	0:44
12.	"Saudi Arabia" (English)	1:52
13.	"Judgement Day" (English)	2:40
14.	"Allah, The Prophet, My Mother" (English)	1:50
15.	"Be Careful + Fearful" (featuring Mecca2Medina) (English, Jamaican Patois)	3:26
16.	"Pow Pow Pow" (English)	0:54
17.	"Like a Soldier" (featuring Abdullah Rolle, Masikah, Feesabilillah and Spitz) (English)	4:14
18.	"Traveller" (English)	1:21
19.	"Outro" (English)	0:47
Total length:		39:35
