= Victim (2011 film) =

- Theatrical release poster
- Directed by: Alex Pillai
- Screenplay by: Ashley Chin; Michael Maris; Michael Kyei; Adrian Scott
- Story by: Ashley Chin; Michael Maris
- Produced by: John Adams; Danny Donnelly; Jason Maza
- Starring: Ashley Chin; Ashley Madekwe; Jason Maza
- Cinematography: Peter Butler
- Edited by: Iain Mitchell
- Music by: Howard Rees
- Production company: Pure Film Productions
- Distributed by: Kaleidoscope Home Entertainment
- Release dates: 2 October 2011 (Raindance Film Festival); 22 June 2012 (United Kingdom)
- Running time: 86 minutes
- Country: United Kingdom
- Language: English

Victim is a 2011 British action drama film directed by Alex Pillai, written by Ashley Chin and Michael Maris, stars Ashley Chin, Ashley Madekwe, Jason Maza, and co-stars Adam Deacon, David Harewood and Giggs. The film is about a young man's attempts to move away from a life of violent crime, with the help of a wholesome country girl who comes to stay with his friend in the city, only to find himself the target of retaliation.

== Plot ==
Tyson (Ashley Chin), Mannie (Jason Maza), and Jason (Michael Maris) grew up together in a working-class area of London's East End. With few opportunities available to them, the three turned to crime, committing armed robberies to support themselves. Davina (Anna Nightingale) assists the group by luring wealthy, unsuspecting men from nightclubs back to their flats, where Tyson and his associates then rob and assault them.

When naive, middle class, country-girl from the Home counties Tia (Ashley Madekwe) comes to stay in the London council flat of her cousin Davina, a close friend of Tyson, little does she realizes that Davina and her friends have a lucrative side-line honey-trap scam and that her naivety will disturb the delicate balance of Davina and her group of friends.

Tia arrives at their block of council flats whilst they celebrate their recent heist in a rundown council tower block. Tia notices Tyson sits apart from the main group. Tyson's reasons for involving himself in their crimes are different from his friends'. For Tyson it is not about living the lifestyle but about supporting his 15-year-old sister, Nyla (Letitia Wright), through school and paying off the gambling debts his alcoholic mum landed them in when she abandoned them. Although Tyson is desperate to break out of the cycle of violence and gangland criminal lifestyle, which has already claimed the lives of some of his friends and acquaintances. He equally wants to provide for Nyla and help her make something of herself, but smart as she is, she has started running with the wrong crowd who seem hell bent on teaching immigrant Victor (Jordy Meya) a lesson. Tyson realises that he is not exactly the best role model.

When Tyson meets Tia, she helps him see that there are other ways to escape the cycle of poverty, a way out of his violent, criminal life, a way to stop being a victim of his circumstances and live his life as an example to his sister. He realises that the way of life he has is only going to end in prison or an early grave, and decides to change his ways. With more in common than expected, Tia and Tyson become drawn to one another.

However Davina disapproves of Tia's positive influence on Tyson and is jealous of their blossoming romance, and begins to plan a terrible revenge designed to also win him back from her.

Meanwhile, before Tyson can turn a corner and leave the street life behind, his mother breaks into his home and robs him of everything he has. He decides to take part in one final job to secure his future, which promises a big payoff, Tyson prepares to take his biggest gamble yet and has to fight not to be drawn back into the cycle of violence. Caught up in an escalating chain of violent events, will he have to make the ultimate sacrifice?

== Cast ==
- Ashley Chin as Tyson
- Ashley Madekwe as Tia
- Jason Maza as Mannie
- Anna Nightingale as Davina
- Michael Maris as Jason
- Letitia Wright as Nyla
- Shanika Warren-Markland as Charmaine
- Natasha Sparkes as Yaren
- David Harewood as Mr. Ansah
- Arnold Oceng as Jayden
- Jordy Meya as Victor
- Frank Harper as Colin
- Richie Campbell as Joseph
- Adam Deacon as Zhartash

== Production ==
The film was shot in and around East London within three weeks between July and August 2010.

The film was produced by John Adams, Danny Donnelly and Jason Maza for Pure Film Productions, and distributed by Kaleidoscope Home Entertainment.

== Release ==
Victim premiered at Apollo Cinema in Piccadilly Circus, London as part of the Raindance Film Festival on 2 October 2011.

The film was signed by Kaleidoscope Home Entertainment for local distribution and international sales on 3 January 2012. Kaleidoscope's sales arm, Kaleidoscope Film Distribution, sold the film internationally at the Berlin International Film Festival in February 2012. Kaleidoscope Home Entertainment sold the film to Well Go USA for North America and Three Lines for Benelux on 20 April 2012.

The film had its official premier at Apollo Cinema in Haymarket, London on 22 June 2012, and was released in 86 UK cinemas. The DVD and Blu-ray of the film was released on 1 October 2012.

== Reception ==
Becky Reed of This Is Fake DIY rated Victim 8/10 and said, it is "hugely admirable in its message, and the manner of delivery - a thought-provoking, gripping thriller." Ifu Ifeacho of SB.TV felt the film "delivers an honest and realistic view of life on road. Without preaching and without glamourising, Victim makes you wonder about the consequences of the choices made in this fast-paced thriller with plenty of action, but quite a few laughs too."

Anthony Quinn of The Independent thought the film started "quite promisingly before succumbing to earnest sloganeering on victimhood and the cliché of a crim's one last job before going straight. By the end, it crams its message into a student essay that's recited in class and greeted, bewilderingly, with applause." Mark Kermode reviewed the film in The Guardian as "the set-ups are familiar, the characters well worn and the film-makers' message (we are all victims) writ cornily large. But co-writer Chin is an imposing screen presence of whom we may expect more in future." David Calhoun of Time Out thought the film was "solidly made, but once you get past the attempts at realism – the banter, the backstories, the music, the clothes – it's a desperately corny yarn."

George Bass of Total Film rated the film 2/5 and described it as a "Heat-style smash-and-grabs (but with binmen) seem even smaller on the small screen, while the sight of young RADA graduates trying to talk tower block doesn't do wonders for its cred. But the ending raises its game..." Paul Bradshaw of Total Film rating it 3/5 said, "Anuva barrel of 'hood clichés it might be, but the sharp cast and snappy script (by Chin and co-star Michael Maris) make it fresher and funnier than it sounds."

RWD thought the film was "packed with powerful performances from the UK's next wave of film stars." Choice FM called the film "entertaining." Flava hailed the film "groundbreaking... brilliant."

Review aggregator Rotten Tomatoes has collected 8 reviews, three positive and five negative, resulting in a 38% approval rating.

== See also ==
- Black British
- Anuvahood
- Sket
- List of hood films
