= Catherine Johnson (novelist) =

British author and screenwriter (born 1962)

Catherine Johnson FRSL
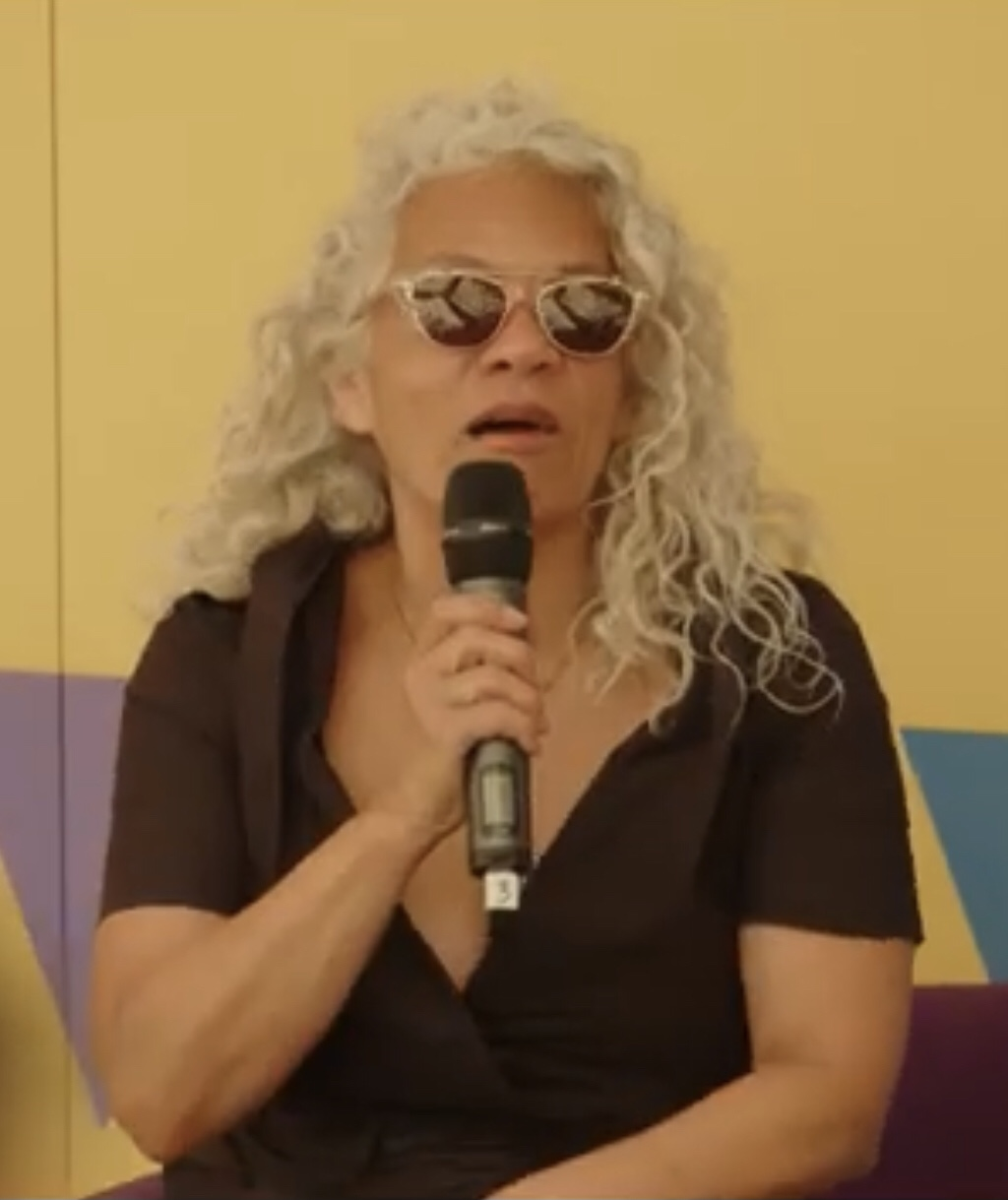
- Johnson in 2023
- Born: 1962 (age 63–64); London, England
- Education: St Martin's School of Art
- Occupations: Novelist and screenwriter
- Writing career
- Notable work: Landlocked
- Notable awards: IBBY White Raven Award
- Website: www.catherinejohnson.co.uk

Catherine Johnson (born 1962) is a British author and screenwriter. She has written several young adult novels and co-wrote the screenplay for the 2004 drama film Bullet Boy (directed by and co-written with Saul Dibb).

== Background and career ==
Catherine Johnson was born in London, England, in 1962. Her father was Jamaican and her mother was Welsh. Johnson grew up in North London and attended Tetherdown Primary School. Later she studied film at St Martin's School of Art, before turning to writing.

Her first book, The Last Welsh Summer, was published by Welsh publisher Pont Books in 1993. She has since written and published 20 novels, including two for children about pioneering Arctic explorer Matthew Henson. In 1999, her book Landlocked was honoured as an International Youth Library White Raven book. Other accolades include the 2014 Young Quills Award for best historical fiction for over-12s for her 2013 book Sawbones, which was also shortlisted for the Rotherham Book Award, the Salford Children's Book Prize and the Hoo Kids Book Award. Johnson won the 2019 Little Rebels Award for Radical Children's Fiction for her 2018 book Freedom.

Johnson also writes for film, television and radio, and with Saul Dibb was co-writer of the screenplay for the 2004 film Bullet Boy.

Johnson has been a Royal Literary Fund Fellow at the London Institute, a Writer in Residence at Holloway Prison and a Reader in Residence at the Royal Festival Hall's Imagine Children's Literature Festival. She has served as a judge for the Jhalak Prize, first awarded in 2017.

In 2019, she was elected a Fellow of the Royal Society of Literature.

Johnson is a contributor to the 2019 anthology New Daughters of Africa, edited by Margaret Busby.

== Bibliography ==
- The Last Welsh Summer. Llandysul: Pont, 1993
- Sophie's Ghost. Llandysul: Pont, 1994
- Other Colours. London: Livewire, 1997
- Landlocked. Llandysul: Pont, 1999
- In Black and White. Oxford: Oxford University Press, 2000
- Hero. Oxford: Oxford University Press, 2001
- Stella. Oxford: Oxford University Press, 2002
- Face Value. Oxford: Oxford University Press, 2005
- Cuts Deep. London: Evans, 2007
- The Dying Game. Oxford: Oxford University Press, 2007
- A Nest of Vipers. London: Corgi, 2008
- Arctic Hero. Edinburgh: Barrington Stoke, 2008
- Con Men. Edinburgh: Barrington Stoke, 2009
- The Munro Inheritance. London: Corgi, 2009
- Nightmare Card. Edinburgh: Barrington Stoke, 2011
- Brave New Girl. London: Frances Lincoln Children's Books, 2011
- Sawbones. London: Walker Books Ltd, 2013
- The Curious Tale of the Lady Caraboo. London: Corgi Books, 2015
- Blade and Bone, London: Walker Books, 2016
- Freedom, Scholastic, 2018
- Riding the Tempest, 2018
- Race to the Frozen North: The Matthew Henson Story, illustrated by Katie Hickey, 2018
- To Liberty! The Adventures of Thomas-Alexandre Dumas. London: Bloomsbury Publishing, 2020
- Dance of Resistance: The Josephine Baker Story. Barrington Stoke, 2025

== Awards ==
- 1999: IBBY White Raven Award - Landlocked
- 1999: Wales Book of the Year Award (shortlist) - Landlocked
- 2002: Hampshire Book Award (shortlist) - Stella
- 2008: Leeds Book of the Year Award (shortlist) - A Nest of Vipers
- 2008: Phoenix Book Award (shortlist) - A Nest of Vipers
- 2009: Birmingham KS3 Chills Award (shortlist) - Arctic Hero
- 2014: Young Quills Award for best historical fiction for over-12s – Sawbones
- 2019: Little Rebels Award for Radical Children's Fiction — Freedom
