= Victor Adebodun =

British director and producer

- Born: 1985; United Kingdom
- Died: April 11, 2018 (aged 32–33)
- Occupations: Director, Producer
- Years active: 2000s–2018
- Known for: Venus Vs Mars, The Intent
- Notable work: Venus Vs Mars (TV series), The Intent (film franchise), Bag Ladies

Victor Adebodun (1985 — 11 April 2018) was a British director and producer best known for UK TV show Venus Vs Mars, which was aired on UK satellite channel Sky Living in 2015, and The Intent movie franchise.

== Career ==
Victor started his career in television and film working for the Soho post production company The Moving Picture Company. He worked on several high-profile films such as Harry Potter, Narnia, G.I. Joe, James Bond's Skyfall as well as Ridley Scott's Prometheus. He worked both in MPC's UK and Canadian branches supporting their vast visual effects team.

In late 2011 he, along with writer Baby Isako, created the web drama Venus Vs Mars, which went on to get over a million views online and receive several awards, including the Screen Nation Digital award for Best Web Series.

In 2014 they convince commissioners at the Leading UK satellite provider BSkyB to commission Venus Vs Mars as a 10-part drama for Sky Living. Venus vs Mars went on to air on 9 April 2015. He directed and produced the short film Bag Ladies, which was accepted in the short film section of the 2014 Cannes Film Festival.

In 2015, he was asked to speak on a panel at the annual Cannes MIPTV Media Market in a talk named 'Digital-Friendly Production 101'; he spoke alongside the VP of Global Content for FremantleMedia International and the CCO of New Form Digital.

He produced and directed alongside filmmaker Femi Oyeniran, an online panel chat show called Cut The Chat, which provides a platform for the discussion of issues that affect young people. The show has proven really successful, and there is a live format every quarter at the Camden Roundhouse.

He also executive produced UK gangster film The Intent and its prequel The Come Up.

Adebodun died on 11 April 2018 at the age of 33.
