= Fedz =

2013 British crime thriller film

- Promotional poster
- Directed by: Q
- Written by: Q
- Produced by: Candice Vetter; Yousaf Uddin
- Starring: Q Joseph Marcell; Wil Johnson
- Cinematography: Sam Brown; Ciro Candia; James Martin; Peter Emery; Martyna Knitter; Boyd Skinner
- Edited by: Andrew Trotman; Robert Hall; Kant Pan; Peter Hollywood
- Music by: Alexander Charles Elliot; Dale Sumner; Duncan Bridgeman
- Production company: Top Dog Productions
- Distributed by: Top Dog
- Release dates: 17 March 2013 (Video on demand); 5 January 2013 (United Kingdom)
- Running time: 90 minutes
- Country: United Kingdom
- Language: English

Fedz (originally based on a short film titled Fever) is a 2013 British crime thriller film directed by, written by and starring Q, aka Kwabena Manso. The film is about a renegade policeman attempting to investigate a terrorist group intending to release an airborne virus in London.

== Plot ==
Policeman, Mike Jones (Q), is given information by his athlete friend, Joey (Silvio Simac), about a terrorist group testing a virus on people. Whilst undercover, Mike tries to earn the trust of Slick Pete (Bradley Gardner), who is planning a bank robbery heist. Later Joey is murdered by his girlfriend, Ty (Shanika Warren-Markland), after refusing to throw his next martial arts fight at the request of Fast Eddie (Joseph Marcell). After Mike finds Joey dead and he suspects Ty was involved after seeing her with a few gangsters earlier. He pursues her for information, after she disregards him, he and his partner are followed back to his house by Rizzle (Gary McDonald) and Big D (Micheal White). Everyone except Mike is killed in a shootout, Mike suspects he was set up and resigns. Ty then orders Barry (Richie Campbel) and Tyson (Ashley Chin) to kill Mike.

Mike goes on the run to solve the virus case and obtain the virus antibodies. Whilst Mike is being pursued by his old colleagues, he obtains diaries about drugs the virus has been planted in from sports-coach, Coach McKenzie (Martina Laird). After she is murdered, Mike gives the diaries to a journalist, Trevor McBride (Wil Johnson), who is then kidnapped for ransom money in exchange for the antibodies, tortured and murdered by Razor (Andrew Harrison). After Mike tells Pete that he is a policeman, Pete orders Kent (Leon Herbert) to kill Mike.

For help, Mike visits Shazz (Maya Sondhi), an ex-scientist who is married to his ex-colleague, Ritchie (David Keyes). Ritchie sends Mike away to Jack Huey (Dermot Keaney) in Brighton to be tortured by Razor (Andrew Harrison). Mike escapes and kills Jack and Razor. Mike gives Shazz evidence incriminating Ritchie for her to pass onto Brighton police. Ritchie kidnaps Shazz and holds her hostage for ransom money. Mike enlists the help of a swat team, who help him kill Ritchie's men in a warehouse. Ritchie is then killed by Mike's former superior Whittaker (Justine Powell).

Mike declines Whittaker's offer for his old job. Barry and Tyson are killed by Ty for doing a drug deal on the side, Mike then kills Ty and warns Ty's driver that if Fast Eddie comes back then he will kill him and Fast Eddie, and then employs him as an informant.

Mike plans a holiday to Hawaii and goes back to his flat where he finds Slick Pete and his men, they all point loaded guns at Mike. The film ends as a gunshot is fired.

== Cast ==
- Q as Mike Jones
- David Keyes as Ritchie
- Dexter Fletcher as DS Hunter
- Joseph Marcell as Eddie "Fast Eddie"
- Wil Johnson as Trevor McBride
- Ashley Walters as "Cherokee" Blame
- Isabella Calthorpe as Detective Carter
- Shanika Warren-Markland as Ty
- Maya Sondhi as "Shazz"
- Martina Laird as Coach McKenzie
- Femi Oyeniran as Detective Harper
- Bradley Gardner as Pete "Slick Pete"
- Justine Powell as DS Whitaker
- Dermot Keaney as Jack Huey
- Andrew Harrison as "Razor"
- Katia Winter as Alessandra Ragnfrid
- Gary McDonald as Rizzle
- Richie Campbell as Barry
- Ashley Chin as Tyson
- Leon Herbert as Kent
- Michael Jai White as "Big D"

== Production and release ==
Original short film poster

Fedz was independently produced. A short of the film premiered at a Hollywood film festival in Summer 2009. At the time the film was titled Fever, and was used as a test screening on American audiences.

The film was not presented to distributors and due to the demise of distributors; HMV, Blockbuster, and Revolver Entertainment, the producers used various online videos to promote a cinema release.

However, due to the shift in retail and distribution, the producers decided to test the distribution market place by releasing the film on video on demand. The film was made available to be streamed on the official website. on 17 March 2013. This was in order for the producers to market and give the audience a second screen experience via their smartphones or iPad. The film has been designed to work interactively with the Shazam and SoundHound applications.

A live hangout event was streamed via Flavour Magazine on Google on 12 April 2013, which featured musicians from the film's soundtrack and guests. A regional cinema tour took place in 2014.

The film premiered at Genesis Cinema in Whitechapel, London on 5 November 2013, which also included live music, featured personal appearances from musicians from the film's soundtrack and guests, and was followed by an after-party.

== Awards and nominations ==
Year	Award	Category	Recipient(s)	Result
2007	Accolade Competition	Award of Excellence	Q	Won
2013	Official Mixtape Awards	Best Mixtape Compilation	DJ Ames	Won

== See also ==
- Deadmeat
- List of hood films
