= Pray Hard =

Pray Hard may refer to:

- Pray Hard (album), by Muslim Belal
- "Pray Hard" (song), by BigXthaPlug featuring Luke Combs
