= Ashley Walters =

British actor and rapper (born 1982)

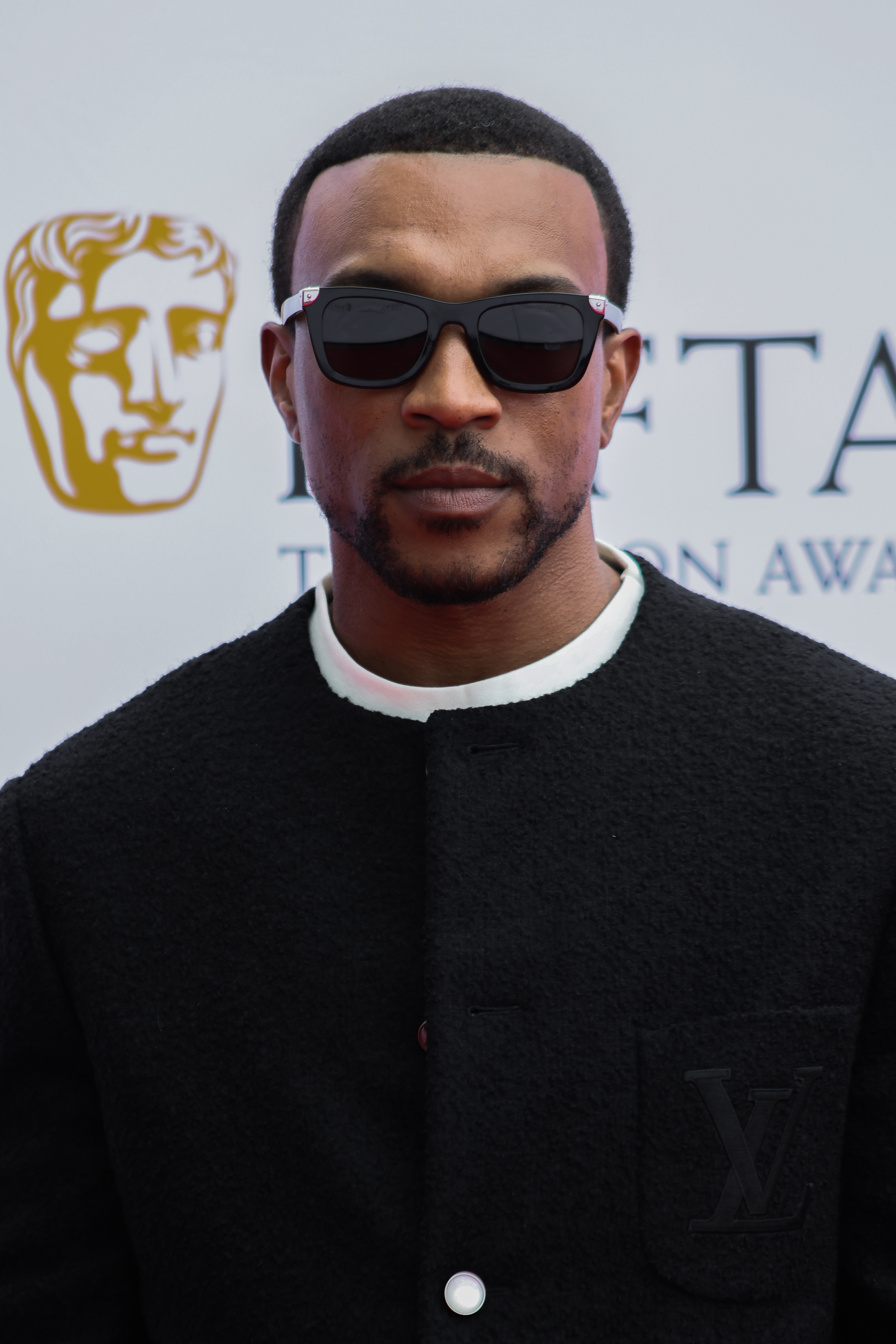
- Walters at the 2026 British Academy Television Awards

Background information
- Also known as: Asher D
- Born: Ashley Anthony Walters; 30 June 1982 (age 44); Peckham, London, England
- Genres: UK garage; grime; hip hop
- Occupations: Actor; rapper; songwriter
- Years active: 1992–present
- Labels: Crescent Moon Media; AD82
- Member of: So Solid Crew
- Children: 8
- Relatives: Olivia Dean (cousin)

Ashley Anthony Walters (born 30 June 1982), also known by his stage name Asher D, is an English actor and rapper. He first rose to fame as a member of the UK garage group So Solid Crew who hit the top spot on the UK charts in 2001 with their second single, "21 Seconds".

On television, Walters is known for his roles in the BBC series Grange Hill (1997), Storm Damage (2000), Hustle (2007), Outcasts (2011), Truckers (2013) and Cuffs (2015), the Channel 4 crime drama Top Boy (2011–2023), the E4 series The Aliens (2016), the Sky One series Bulletproof (2018–2021), the Disney+ series A Thousand Blows (2025), and the Netflix series Missing You and Adolescence (both 2025). He also directed episodes of A Thousand Blows. Walters earned Primetime Emmy and Golden Globe Award nominations for his performance in Adolescence. His films include Bullet Boy (2004), Get Rich or Die Tryin' (2005) and Life and Lyrics (2006).

== Early life and education ==
Ashley Anthony Walters was born on 30 June 1982 in Peckham, south-east London, to Jamaican and Guyanese parents. He was raised by his mother, Pamela Case, a local government officer. Walters has said his father's absence while he was growing up contributed to his criminal behaviour.

He attended St. George's CE Primary School, Camberwell, from the age of four, then at Pimlico School, now known as Pimlico Academy, completing his GCSEs, receiving good grades in all 10 subjects. He also studied performing arts at the Sylvia Young Theatre School.

In July 2001, following an argument with a traffic warden, Walters was found to be carrying a loaded Brocock air pistol modified to fire live ammunition. He was arrested and, in 2002, jailed for 18 months, in a young offenders' institute. Having spent the previous nine months in custody, he subsequently served an additional seven months to complete his sentence.

== Music career ==
Walters started his music career as a rapper known as Asher D, joining the Battersea-based UK garage group So Solid Crew in 2001. The group achieved a number one hit on the UK singles chart in 2001, with their second single, "21 Seconds".

After the group split, he went solo, recording the album In Memory of the Street Fighter (2006), featuring the single "Andrea", and the track "Every Little Thing I Say". He released a studio album in 2008 entitled The Appetiser, a 12-track album produced with Laurence Ezra.

In early 2012, Walters signed a recording contract with the independent record label SK Records. His single "How You Like Me Now" was released on 29 July 2012, followed by "Your Love" released on 12 November 2012, featuring vocals from Alesha Dixon.

== Acting career ==
Walters appeared on television as Omar in The Young Indiana Jones Chronicles (1992) at age 10, and as Andy in Grange Hill (1997), at the age of 14. He appeared in Saul Dibb's 2004 feature film Bullet Boy, where he played Ricky, who had just been released from prison and back into living a normal life, a role for which Walters was named Best Newcomer at the British Independent Film Awards. He also appeared in 2005's Get Rich or Die Tryin'.

In 2006, he played the role of Wolf in the film Stormbreaker, and Danny in Life and Lyrics,. In 2007, he starred in WΔZ, alongside Selma Blair and Melissa George, and in Sugarhouse. He played Lacey in the BBC Three drama pilot West 10 LDN. He played the character Billy Bond in five episodes of the fourth series of BBC TV drama Hustle. He also appeared in the MTV series Top Buzzer and played the role of Al B alongside Dennis Hopper in House of 9 (2006).

Walters performed on stage in 2002 at the Royal National Theatre in Roy Williams' Sing Yer Heart Out for the Lads and in 2008 at the Royal Court Theatre in Levi David Addai's Oxford Street. Another feature film, Tuesday (2008), sees him playing a jewel thief. He appeared in Bola Agbaje's play Off the Endz at the Royal Court Theatre during February and March 2010.

He made appearances in ITV's police drama The Bill and firefighting drama London's Burning. His Grange Hill history and autobiography was referenced by the comedian Stewart Lee on 16 March 2009, on the BBC Two show Stewart Lee's Comedy Vehicle in the episode themed on "Toilet Books". Walters also appeared on BBC TV in 2009's adaptation of Andrea Levy's Small Island, and as Jack Holt in the short-lived drama Outcasts (2011).

For the BBC Learning project "Off By Heart Shakespeare", Walters delivered one of Shakespeare's best known speeches — "But soft, what light through yonder window breaks?" from Romeo and Juliet. In October 2011, Walters starred in the Arjun Rose slasher Demons Never Die. From 2011, he played Dushane in Channel 4's four-part drama Top Boy.

In February 2012, he played Chris in the BBC drama Inside Men. He managed to get in trouble with the producers on the first day of filming the Doctor Who episode "Journey to the Centre of the TARDIS", when he tweeted a picture of himself in his costume in his trailer with the word "space". The picture was immediately removed. In 2013, Walters reprised his role as main character Dushane in the second series of Top Boy. In 2017, Walters received the British Urban Film Festival (BUFF) honorary award for 25 years of outstanding contribution to film and television.

From 2018 to 2022, Walters co-created and co-starred alongside Noel Clarke in the British police procedural television series, Bulletproof, where he played NCA Officer Ronnie Pike for 3 seasons. In 2024, Walters starred in an advertising campaign for PG Tips, directed by Steve McQueen.

In 2025, production started on Animol, his feature length directorial debut. Later in 2025, he played Detective Inspector Luke Bascombe in the Netflix series Adolescence, where his character was the central figure in two episodes, that were continuously shot in one-hour long uncut segments of filming. Waters later admitted that it was the most difficult acting experience he had ever had to undertake. For his performance, he was nominated for the 2025 Primetime Emmy Award for Outstanding Supporting Actor in a Limited or Anthology Series or Movie.

== Personal life ==
Walters with his wife Danielle Isaie in 2026

Walters has four children with his ex-partner. He lives with his wife, Danielle Walters, and their four children in Herne Bay, Kent. His wife is an actress featured in Chewing Gum, Top Boy, and EastEnders. Walters is a cousin of singer Olivia Dean.

On 31 March 2014, he was fined £600 after he admitted assaulting a security guard in Aberdeen in September 2013. In July 2014, he was fined £1,250 for possession of cannabis at Holyhead, Anglesey. In May 2016, Walters was fined £1,000 after admitting to using threatening words and behaviour towards staff at the Hilton Hotel, Islington.

Walters is an avid supporter of Arsenal F.C.

=== Political views ===
In December 2019, along with 42 other leading cultural figures, Walters signed a letter endorsing the Labour Party under Jeremy Corbyn's leadership in the 2019 general election. The letter stated that "Labour's election manifesto under Jeremy Corbyn's leadership offers a transformative plan that prioritises the needs of people and the planet over private profit and the vested interests of a few."

== Filmography ==
Key
| † | Denotes works that have not yet been released |

=== Film ===
| Year | Title | Role | Notes |
|---|---|---|---|
| 1999 | Take 2 | Bro | 1st Short film |
| 2000 | The Elevator | Young man | 1st Short film |
| 2000 | Some Voices | Kitchen hand | |
| 2000 | Born Romantic | Lee | |
| 2004 | Bullet Boy | Ricky | |
| 2005 | House of 9 | Al B | Credited as Asher D |
| 2005 | Goal! | Carl Francis | |
| 2005 | Get Rich or Die Tryin' | Antoine | |
| 2006 | Stormbreaker | Wolf | |
| 2006 | Cubs | Karl | Short film |
| 2006 | Life and Lyrics | Danny Lewis | |
| 2007 | WΔZ | Daniel Leone | |
| 2007 | Sugarhouse | D | |
| 2008 | Speed Racer | Prince Kabala | |
| 2008 | Tuesday | Billy | |
| 2011 | Reparations for the Soul | The Entity | short film |
| 2011 | Anuvahood | Cracks | |
| 2011 | Sket | Trey | |
| 2011 | Demons Never Die | Bates | |
| 2012 | St. George's Day | Kootz | |
| 2013 | Fedz | Cherokee Blame | |
| 2013 | Grace and Danger | Felling | |
| 2013 | All Stars | Mark | |
| 2014 | Montana | Ryan | |
| 2016 | Billionaire Ransom | Danny Dorsey | |
| 2016 | Demain tout commence | Lowell | |
| 2026 | Remain | Oscar | |
| 2026 | Animol † | —N/a | Director, Post-production |

=== Television ===
| Year | Title | Role | Notes |
|---|---|---|---|
| 1992 | The Adventures of Young Indiana Jones | Omar | Episode: "My First Adventure" 1st credit |
| 1997 | Grange Hill | Andy Phillips | 12 episodes |
| 1999 | The Murder of Stephen Lawrence | Stuart Lawrence | |
| 2000 | The Coral Island | Jack | |
| 2000 | Storm Damage | Stefan | |
| 2000 | Urban Gothic | Leo | Episode: "Dead Meat" |
| 2000 | The Bill | Michael Dexter | Episode: "Search Me" |
| 2000 | Never Never | Lee | 2 episodes |
| 2001 | Shockers: Parent's Night | Brian | |
| 2001 | The Whistle-Blower | Keith Lindo | 2 episodes |
| 2001 | The Bill | Jess Thomas | Episode: "Lick of Paint" |
| 2001 | Dark Realm | Student | Episode: "Castle Keep" |
| 2002 | The Hidden City | Sid | 21 episodes |
| 2003 | Holby City | Roy Woodley | Episode: "One of Our Own" |
| 2004 | Top Buzzer | Bugsy | Episode: "Germination" |
| 2005 | Last Rights | Max | 3 episodes |
| 2007 | Hustle | Billy Bond | 6 episodes |
| 2008 | West 10 LDN | Lacey | |
| 2009 | Small Island | Michael | |
| 2010 | Five Days | Jamal Matthews | 5 episodes |
| 2011 | Bedlam | Mark | Episode: "Committed" |
| 2011 | Outcasts | Jack Holt | 8 episodes |
| 2011–2023 | Top Boy | Dushane | Main role, also executive producer (Season 4–5) |
| 2012 | Inside Men | Chris | 4 episodes |
| 2012 | True Love | Paul | Episode: "Story Four" |
| 2012 | Sinbad | Abdul-Fahim | Episode: "House of Games" |
| 2013 | Doctor Who | Gregor Van Baalen | Episode: "Journey to the Centre of the TARDIS" |
| 2013 | Truckers | Steven Warley | 5 episodes |
| 2014 | The Musketeers | Charon | Episode: "The Homecoming" |
| 2014 | The Secrets | Ray | Episode: "The Return" |
| 2014 | Silent Witness | DI Dale Carter | Episodes: "Fraternity" Parts 1 & 2 |
| 2015 | Cuffs | PC Ryan Draper | 8 episodes |
| 2016 | The Aliens | Christophe | 6 episodes |
| 2017 | Safe House | John Channing | 4 episodes |
| 2017 | In The Dark | DI Tim Cornish | Episodes: "Time of Death", parts 1 & 2 |
| 2018–2021 | Bulletproof | NCA Officer Ronnie Pike | Main Role – 17 episodes Also co-creator |
| 2025 | A Thousand Blows | Switch (Hezekiah Moscow's Father) | Episode 2 & 6: Flashbacks; Also Directed episodes 4, 5 & 6 |
| 2025 | Missing You | Josh Buchanan | 6 episodes |
| 2025 | Adolescence | DI Luke Bascombe | 2 episodes |
| TBA | First Woman | Ben Reith | Upcoming six-part drama |

=== Web ===
| Year | Title | Role | Notes |
|---|---|---|---|
| 2018 | Shiro's Story | Ty | Part 3 (Short YouTube Series); Cameo |

== Discography ==
=== Studio albums ===
| Date | Title | Chart positions | Credit |
| Date | Title | UK | Credit |
|---|---|---|---|
| 2002 | Why Me?: Unreleased debut studio album | – | Asher D |
| 14 June 2004 | Street Sibling: Second studio album | – | Asher D |
| 9 October 2006 | In Memory of the Street Fighter: Third studio album | – | Asher D |
| 26 February 2009 | Ashley Walters: Fourth studio album | – | Ashley Walters |

=== Mixtapes ===
| Date | Title | Chart positions | Credit |
| Date | Title | UK | Credit |
|---|---|---|---|
| June 2006 | Cure 4 Cancer: First mixtape | – | Asher D |
| 4 February 2007 | The Appetiser: Second mixtape | – | Asher D |
| 15 December 2011 | Forgotten Treasures Vol. 1: Third mixtape | – | Ashley Walters |
| 31 December 2011 | Forgotten Treasures Vol. 2: Forth mixtape | – | Ashley Walters |
| 31 December 2011 | Forgotten Treasures Vol. 3: Fifth mixtape | – | Ashley Walters |
| 2 January 2012 | Forgotten Treasures Vol. 4: Sixth mixtape | – – | Ashley Walters |
| 16 February 2012 | Forgotten Treasures: The Complete Legacy: Compilation mixtape | – | Ashley Walters |

=== Singles ===
| Date | Title | Chart positions | Album | Credit |
| Date | Title | UK | Album | Credit |
|---|---|---|---|---|
| 27 May 2002 | "Back in the Day"/"Why Me?" | #43 | Why Me? | Asher D |
| 14 February 2006 | "This is Real" | – | In Memory of the Street Fighter | Asher D |
| 1 August 2006 | "Andrea" | – | In Memory of the Street Fighter | Asher D |
| 9 July 2007 | "Still Here" | – | In Memory of the Street Fighter | Asher D |
| 5 November 2007 | "Inside Out" | – | Non-album single | Asher D featuring Ghetto |
| 28 July 2008 | "Lies" | – | Non-album single | Baby J featuring Ashley Walters |
| 28 October 2008 | "M.O. (Pt. 2)" | – | Ashley Walters | Ashley Walters |
| 12 January 2009 | "With You" | – | Ashley Walters | Ashley Walters featuring Mutya Buena |
| 18 May 2009 | "Own Two Feet" | – | Ashley Walters | Ashley Walters featuring Chipmunk |
| 29 July 2012 | "How You Like Me Now" | – | TBC | Ashley Walters featuring Lisa Moorish |
| 11 November 2012 | "Your Love" | – | TBC | Ashley Walters featuring Alesha Dixon |

== Awards and nominations ==
| Year | Award | Category | Work | Result | Ref |
|---|---|---|---|---|---|
| 2004 | British Independent Film Awards | Most Promising Newcomer | Bullet Boy | Won | |
| 2020 | National Film Awards UK | Best Actor in a TV Series | Top Boy | Nominated | |
| 2025 | Primetime Emmy Awards | Outstanding Supporting Actor in a Limited or Anthology Series or Movie | Adolescence | Nominated | |
| 2025 | OFTA Television Awards | Best Supporting Actor | Adolescence | Nominated | |
| 2025 | Gold Derby Awards | Best Limited/Movie Supporting Actor | Adolescence | Nominated | |
| 2025 | National Film Awards UK | Best Supporting Actor | Adolescence | Nominated | |
| 2025 | Black Reel Awards | Outstanding Supporting Performance in a TV Movie/Limited Series | Adolescence | Nominated | |
| 2025 | Astra TV Awards | Best Supporting Actor in a Limited Series or TV Movie | Adolescence | Nominated | |
| 2026 | British Academy Television Awards | Best Supporting Actor | Adolescence | Nominated | |
| 2026 | Critics' Choice Awards | Best Supporting Actor in a Limited Series or Movie Made for Television | Adolescence | Nominated | |
| 2026 | Golden Globe Awards | Best Supporting Male Actor on Television | Adolescence | Nominated | |
