= Ismael Lea South =

- Born: Lea South; Willesden, Brent, London, England
- Origin: London, England
- Genres: Islamic, hip hop, Nasheed
- Occupations: Rapper, youth worker
- Instrument: Vocals
- Label: Crescent Moon Media
- Website: mecca2medina.net

Lea South, better known as Ismael Lea South, is an English rapper, community activist and youth worker of Jamaican descent.

== Early life ==
South was in Willesden, London, England. Both his parents are from Jamaica, his father came to the United Kingdom in the late 1950s and his mother in the early 1960s. He was brought up as a Christian.

South attended South Kilburn High School and studied marketing at London College of Communication. He started writing lyrics at school. He later joined an underground group Strictly Business with Gee and Mic Check One. They were later signed by an underground recording label. He converted to Islam in this process and left due to artistic content disagreements.

== Career ==
South met Rakin Fetuga in Hyde Park's Speakers' Corner and then later at a Muslim event in Westminster University. After working together in an aromatherapy business, Rakin and him formed the group Mecca2Medina in 1996.

South is a project and events manager for the Black Youth Drugs Line, which works against drugs and anti-social behaviour in UK inner cities.

He has co-hosted and managed the urban stages at the Islam Expo in Olympia and the Global Peace and Unity Event in ExCeL Exhibition Centre. He co-hosts Islam Channel's urban show Brother's in the Deen.

In 2006, South co-founded The Salam Project with Rakin Fetuga, which organises urban Islamic events and initiatives. He organises Muslim Hip hop and comedy events such as the Muslim Hip Hop Summit. He also co-founded of TSP Urban Youth.

He also works as a consultant in Islamic urban projects in the Muslim community and is a learning mentor at Bright Futures Consulting. He is currently working on Crescent Moon Media recording label.

In March 2014, South was interviewed by Mark Dean on BBC Radio Northampton, discussing specialised support for Muslim converts from Britain's African and Caribbean communities.

== Personal life ==
In April 2008, South got married. He lives in London with his wife and daughter.

== See also ==
- Black British
- British Jamaican
- British hip hop
- List of converts to Islam
- Islamic music
- Nasheed
