= The Transition (album) =

Studio album by Muslim Belal
- Released: 23 October 2010
- Recorded: 2010
- Genre: Islamic; Nasheed; hip hop; spoken word
- Length: 43:36
- Language: English; Arabic
- Label: Halal Dawa Records

Muslim Belal chronology
Pray Hard (2009)	The Transition (2010)	My Sumaya (2015)

The Transition is the second studio album by Muslim Belal, released on 23 October 2010 by Halal Dawa Records.

== Release ==
The Transition was released by Halal Dawa Records on 23 October 2010 at the Global Peace and Unity Event in the ExCeL Exhibition Centre in London.

Belal's poetry combines spiritualism with social issues and his own personal history. The album features themes of his conversion to Islam, his personal background, life experience, problems of the Muslim community, encouraging good deeds and preparations for the hereafter.

== Track listing ==
No.	Title	Length
1.	"Intro"	2:24
2.	"I See Clearly"	2:47
3.	"The Transition"	2:56
4.	"Disappointment"	2:37
5.	"Redemption Poem"	2:19
6.	"Street Muadhin"	3:39
7.	"Standing There"	4:15
8.	"Like a Soldier (part 2)"	3:49
9.	"Prison Poem"	1:47
10.	"Freedom" (featuring Lowkey)	2:22
11.	"Viva Philistine"	2:30
12.	"Tears"	1:48
13.	"Praise Him Daily"	3:04
14.	"Sumaya"	2:13
15.	"As Salaamu Alaikum"	2:18
16.	"Outro"	2:48
Total length:		43:36
