= My Sumaya =

Studio album by Muslim Belal
- Released: 19 May 2015
- Genre: Islamic, Nasheed, hip hop, spoken word
- Length: 62:44
- Language: English, Arabic
- Label: Halal Dawa Records

Muslim Belal chronology
The Transition (2010)	My Sumaya (2015)	Hearts Are More Attractive Than Faces (2017)

My Sumaya is the third studio album by Muslim Belal, released on 19 May 2015 by Halal Dawa Records.

== Release ==
The album was released on 19 May 2015. It is a charity album with all the proceeds going towards feeding the most vulnerable children in Eastern Sudan.

== Track listing ==
No.	Title	Length
1.	"Nation of Ignorance" (featuring Castilo and Suli Breaks)	07:06
2.	"Black Slave" (featuring Faisal Salah)	04:15
3.	"Guidance"	03:21
4.	"Sumaya Interlude"	00:32
5.	"Cry" (featuring Castillo)	04:30
6.	"Faisal Salah Muslim Belal Interlude" (featuring Faisal Salah)	01:14
7.	"Muslim" (featuring Faisal Salah)	02:20
8.	"Journey" (featuring Faisal Salah)	02:13
9.	"My Sumaya" (featuring Abdullah Rolle)	03:41
10.	"Brother"	02:50
11.	"Pray for Me"	01:53
12.	"Guns & Roses 2" (featuring Abdullah Rolle)	03:48
13.	"Sister"	03:15
14.	"The Full Story"	03:15
15.	"Streets 2 Islam 2" (featuring Masikah and Castillo)	04:08
16.	"Searching" (featuring Castillo)	03:19
17.	"United" (featuring Omar Esa)	03:46
18.	"Pathfinder"	04:02
19.	"Allah Is Great" (featuring Omar Esa)	03:16
Total length:		62:44
