= Richard Laxton =

British film director (born 1967)

Richard Laxton (born 5 July 1967 in London) is a British film director

== Career ==
Richard Laxton started his career with the short film I Bet It Will Rain in 1992. Initially he mainly worked for TV production, and was nominated for British Academy Film Awards for several of his TV episodes. In 2006 he made his first feature film Life and Lyrics. His next feature films were Grow Your Own in 2007, An Englishman in New York in 2009 and Effie Gray in 2012. His last production for TV were the twelve episodes of the series Him & Her in 2011. In 2013 he realised a biographical film entitled Effie Gray.

== Filmography ==
- 1992: I Bet It Will Rain (short)
- 1993: EastEnders (TV series), 1 episode: Episode dated 1 April 1993 (1993)
- 1994: Lovejoy (TV series), 1 episode: Fair Exchange (1994)
- 1995: Band of Gold (TV series), 3 episodes: Sold (1995); Damaged (1995); Revenge (1995)
- 1995: Out of the Blue (TV series), 2 episodes: Episode; 1.3 (1995); Episode; 1.4 (1995)
- 1996: The Hello Girls (TV series)
- 1996: Poldark (TV film)
- 1997: McCallum (TV series), 1 episode: Dead But Still Breathing (1997)
- 1997: Wing and a Prayer (TV series), 5 episodes: Hello, Goodbye (1997); A Sense of Belonging (1997); Looking After Number One (1997); A Fair Exchange (1997); The Greater Good (1997)
- 1998: Invasion: Earth (TV mini-series), 3 episodes: The Fall of Man (1998); The Battle More Costly (1998); The Shatterer of Worlds (1998)
- 1999: Life Support (TV series), 3 episodes: Where Angels Fear to Tread (1999); Trust (1999); The Price of Love (1999)
- 2000: Border Cafe (TV mini-series)
- 2001–2002: The Inspector Lynley Mysteries (TV series), 3 episodes: A Great Deliverance (2001); For the Sake of Elena (2002); Missing Joseph (2002)
- 2003: Hearts of Gold (TV film)
- 2004: Sea of Souls (TV series), 2 episodes: That Old Black Magic: Part 1 (2004); That Old Black Magic: Part 2 (2004)
- 2004: Bodies (TV series), 2 episodes: Episode; 1.3 (2004); Episode; 1.4 (2004)
- 2004: Outlaws (TV series), 4 episodes: The Soft Spot (2004); Sins of the Father (2004); Three Monkeys (2004); The Power and the Glory (2004)
- 2005: The Ghost Squad (TV series), 3 episodes: One of Us (2005); Necessary Means (2005); Colour Blind (2005)
- 2006: Life and Lyrics
- 2007: Grow Your Own
- 2007: Free Agents (TV film)
- 2008: Hancock and Joan (TV film)
- 2009: An Englishman in New York
- 2010: Accused (TV series), 2 episodes: Helen's Story (2010); Liam's Story (2010)
- 2011: The Night Watch (TV film)
- 2011: Him & Her (TV series), 12 episodes: The Toast (6 September 2010); The Birthday (13 September 2010); The Fancy Dress Party (20 September 2010); The Football (27 September 2010); The Parents (4 October 2010); The Argument (11 October 2010); The Sleep-over (8 November 2011); The Get-together (15 November 2011); The Fight (22 November 2011); The Rollover (29 November 2011); The Cinema (6 December 2011); The Split (13 December 2011)
- 2013: Effie Gray
- 2018: Mrs Wilson
- 2020: Honour (TV Drama)
