= Aimée Kelly =

English actress

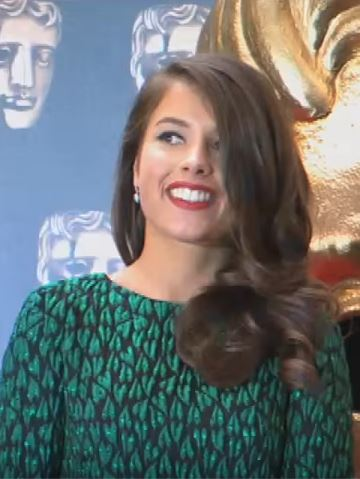
- Kelly in 2013
- Born: Newcastle upon Tyne, England
- Occupation: Actress
- Years active: 2006, 2011–present
- Spouse: Alex Bibby (m. 2022)
- Children: 2

Aimée Kelly is an English actress. She began her career in the film Sket (2011) and the CBBC drama Wolfblood (2012–2013), the latter of which earned her a BAFTA Children's Award nomination. She has since appeared in the film The Duke (2020), This England (2022), and the Apple TV+ series Hijack (2023).

== Early life and education ==
Kelly is from Fenham in the west-end of Newcastle upon Tyne. She attended Sacred Heart Catholic High School, where her English teacher persuaded her to go into performing arts when she was 11. She took extra-curricular drama lessons at the Sage Academy with her twin Katie. Kelly won a scholarship to attend Tring Park School for the Performing Arts in Hertfordshire for two years. Before being cast in Sket, Kelly worked as a waitress in a bar and as a shop assistant. She later went to university in Leeds.

== Career ==
At 16, Kelly auditioned for the role of Minnie McGuinness in the E4 series Skins. After this audition, casting director Jane Ripley contacted Kelly about a film. Kelly landed the role of Kayla Richards in Sket, marking Kelly's debut film. The film earned her a nomination for Best British Newcomer at the 2011 BFI London Film Festival.

The following year, Kelly was cast in the lead role of Madeleine "Maddy" Smith in the CBBC series Wolfblood. In 2013 for the show's second series, she was nominated for Best Performer at the British Academy Children's Awards for her performance as Maddy in the CBBC series Wolfblood. It was announced in 2014 that Kelly would exit Wolfblood ahead of its third series to make time for university. She wrote "It wasn't an easy decision but sometimes education comes first! Thank you so much to all of you that supported me along the way!"

Kelly returned to acting in 2017, appearing in the play Hyem at the Theatre503. In 2019 and 2020, she had film roles in Armando Iannucci's The Personal History of David Copperfield and the Roger Michell's The Duke respectively. The former premiered at the Toronto International Film Festival and the latter, at the Venice Film Festival. In 2023, Kelly had a main role in the Apple TV+ thriller Hijack and starred in a one-woman show adaptation of Eliza Clark's novel Boy Parts at the Soho Theatre.

== Personal life ==
Kelly met photographer Alex Bibby while studying in Leeds and began a relationship. They were originally going to marry on their tenth anniversary, but the wedding was postponed due to the COVID-19 pandemic. They officially married in September 2022 at Burgh House in North London. The couple have two sons (born March 2022 and January 2024).

== Filmography ==
=== Film ===
Year	Title	Role	Notes
2011	The Inbetweeners Movie	Girl	
2011	Sket	Kayla	
2018	Network Rail - Always On	Ally	Short film to promote rail safety
2018	18	Ali	Short film
2019	The Personal History of David Copperfield	Emily	
2020	The Duke	Irene	

=== Television ===
Year	Title	Role	Notes
2012	Playhouse Presents	Sammy	Episode: "Care"
2012–2013	Wolfblood	Maddy Smith	Main role (series 1–2)
2013	Bringing Books to Life	Herself – Narrator	Episode: "My Naughty Little Sister"
2014	Call the Midwife	Norma	Episode #3.8
2017	Doctors	Carly O'Brien	Episode: "Late"
2017	Holby City	Primrose Budd	Episode: "Kingdom Come"
2021	Grantchester	Rachel Bromilow	1 episode
2022	Silent Witness	DC Sharon Griffiths	Episode #25.5
2022	This England	Alison / Elise Larkin	Miniseries
2023	Hijack	Jamie Constantinou / Bella Cunningham	Main role
2023	Platform 7	Sasha	3 episodes
2025	I Fought the Law	Judith Morden	

=== Music videos ===
- "Brave" (2022), Ella Henderson

== Stage ==
Year	Title	Role	Notes
2017	Hyem	Laura	Theatre503, London
2023	Boy Parts		Soho Theatre, London

== Awards and nominations ==
Year	Award	Category	Work	Result	Ref.
2011	London Film Festival	Best British Newcomer	Sket	Nominated	
2013	British Academy Children's Awards	Children's Performer	Wolfblood	Nominated	
