= The Boxer (2012 film) =

- Directed by: Henry Blake
- Written by: Daniel Bailey
- Produced by: Victoria Bavister; Kristin McIlquham
- Starring: Paul Barber; Ashley Chin; Victoria Bavister; Kristin McIlquham
- Cinematography: Stuart Nicholas White
- Edited by: Hoping Chen
- Music by: Gary Judd; Hannah Assai
- Production company: Scruffbag Productions
- Release date: 17 April 2012 (United Kingdom)
- Running time: 7 minutes
- Country: United Kingdom
- Language: English

The Boxer is a 2012 British drama short film directed by Henry Blake, written by Daniel Bailey, stars Paul Barber and Ashley Chin, and produced by Scruffbag Productions. The film is about the relationship between a young man and his grandfather.

== Plot ==
20-year-old Michael Jacobs (Ashley Chin) is about to have his first professional boxing match against the reigning champion, and his 60-year-old grandfather, Joe Jacobs (Paul Barber), cannot be there with him in his corner because he is ill in hospital.

Michael visits Joe in hospital hours before the biggest fight of his life. Michael is lonely, scared, in turmoil, and struggling to find the strength to go it alone and take advice from strangers. Joe advises Michael to focus and inspires him that "contenders think" and "champions feel".

== Cast ==
- Paul Barber as Joe
- Ashley Chin as Michael
- Victoria Bavister as Lucy
- Kristin McIlquham as Marie
- Kreshnik Noka as Opponent
- Ali Aamir as Corner Man 1
- Stephen Graham as Corner Man 2
- Artus Noka as Corner Man 3
- Tony Noka as Corner Man 4
- John Tiftik as Referee
- Zaffar Van Kawala as Promoter

== Production ==
The film was written by Daniel Bailey, a 22-year-old landscape architecture student at Kingston University residing in Neasden, London.

The screenplay was one of 60 entries into "Project 7", which was a script-writing competition for young people aged between 12 and 24 to create a seven-minute short film based around one of the seven core Olympic and Paralympic Values (Respect, Excellence, Friendship, Courage, Determination, Inspiration and Equality). The film was based around the value of "inspiration".

The film was shot using a Sony F3 camera. It was set at the Stonebridge Boxing Club in Willesden, London. It was produced by Scruffbag Productions as a result of receiving commission from Brent Council and West London Partnership of London 2012.

== Release ==
On 17 April 2012, the film along with the runner-up of "Project 7", premiered during a special screening at the Lexi Cinema in Kensal Rise, London. On 2 May 2012, the film was screened at Horse Hospital in Russell Square, London.

In September 2012, the film was entered in the Raindance Film Festival.
