= Sket =

2011 film directed by Nirpal Bhogal

- Directed by: Nirpal Bhogal
- Written by: Nirpal Bhogal
- Produced by: Nick Taussig; Paul Van Carter; Daniel Toland; Terry Stone
- Starring: Ashley Walters; Lily Loveless; Riann Steele; Aimee Kelly; Emma Hartley-Miller; Adelayo Adedayo
- Production company: Gunslinger
- Distributed by: Revolver Entertainment
- Release dates: 22 October 2011 (BFI Film on the Square); 28 October 2011 (United Kingdom)
- Running time: 80 minutes
- Country: United Kingdom
- Language: English
- Budget: $1 million

Sket is a 2011 British urban revenge thriller film, set in the inner estates of North West London. Released in October 2011, the film comes from the makers of Shank (2010) and Anuvahood (2011). Starring Lily Loveless, Aimee Kelly, Adelayo Adedayo, Emma Hartley-Miller, Slaine Kelly, Varada Sethu and Ashley Walters as the lead stars, the film is the feature-length directorial debut of writer Nirpal Bhogal. Sket was filmed on location in London. The estate where Kayla and her sister live is the Rowley Way Estate near West Hampstead, whilst the girl gang are shown living at the Whittington Estate on Dartmouth Park Hill, with one scene filmed in nearby Chester Road. Both estates are in the borough of Camden. The film premiered at the BFI London Film Festival as part of the "Film on the Square", and was released in cinemas Nationwide on 28 October 2011. The DVD and Blu-ray were released on 5 March 2012.

== Plot ==
Sisters Kayla (Aimée Kelly) and Tanya (Kate Foster-Barnes) move from Newcastle upon Tyne to commence a new life near their estranged father after their mother has died. Kayla is reluctant to reconcile with him. Meanwhile, drug dealer/gang-boss Trey (Ashley Walters) has instructed his female companion Shaks (Riann Steele) to murder a crackhead who has fallen behind on the payments for her drugs.

On her way home from a day of shopping, two youths harass Kayla on the bus. However, she manages to escape from harm after Danielle (Emma Hartley-Miller) and her crew beats them up. After her ordeal, Kayla decides to return home, instead of meeting her sister for a meal in a cafe. As Tanya leaves the cafe, she finds Trey attacking Shaks for not confronting the crackhead and tries to help Shaks. Instead, Trey pounces on Tanya and leaves her in the street to die. Worrying that Kayla will reveal the identity of her sister's killer to the police, Trey sends his men to take her out. Realizing that she is slowly running out of options, Kayla realizes her only hope of survival and revenge is to get in tow with Danielle and her crew, but could her new friendship cost Danielle's life?

== Cast ==
- Ashley Walters as Trey
- Lily Loveless as Hannah
- Riann Steele as Shaks
- Aimee Kelly as Kayla
- Emma Hartley-Miller as Danielle
- Adelayo Adedayo as Kerry
- Varada Sethu as Kiran
- Richie Campbell as Ruds
- Kate Foster-Barnes as Tanya
- Michael Maris as Drew
- Ashley Chin as Titch
- Leon Ajikawo as Reet
- Candis Nergaard as Scarred Woman
- David Nellist as Kayla's Dad
- Marc Sutcliffe as Sparks
