= Bullet Boy =

2004 British film by Saul Dibb

- Directed by: Saul Dibb
- Written by: Saul Dibb; Catherine Johnson
- Produced by: Marc Boothe; Ruth Caleb; Michael Tait; Paul Hamann
- Starring: Ashley Walters; Luke Fraser
- Cinematography: Marcel Zyskind
- Edited by: John Mister; Masahiro Hirakubo
- Music by: Neil Davidge; Robert del Naja; Massive Attack
- Production companies: Verve Pictures; BBC Films; UK Film Council; Portman Films; Shine Limited
- Distributed by: Verve Pictures
- Release dates: 15 September 2004 (Toronto International Film Festival); 8 April 2005
- Running time: 89 minutes
- Country: United Kingdom
- Language: English

Bullet Boy is a 2004 British crime drama film directed by Saul Dibb, written by Saul Dibb and Catherine Johnson, and starring Ashley Walters. The film's original music was composed and performed by Robert Del Naja of Massive Attack, who released it as an album. The film is about a family in crime-ridden Hackney, East London, the eldest son's involvement in gun crime, and the effects of this on his younger brother.

== Plot ==
Upon being released from prison, Ricky (Ashley Walters) is collected by Wisdom, an eccentric and naive friend who is desperate to establish himself within their neighbourhood. Immediately after arriving back, Wisdom accidentally breaks a wing mirror off a car belonging to Godfrey, a local gang member. The following confrontation leads to Ricky pulling away Wisdom in an attempt to keep peace. Wisdom later returns a gun to Ricky, who stores it within his bedroom, which is shared with his younger brother Curtis who finds the weapon and hides it away for his brother himself.

Wisdom hunts down Godfrey for claiming he is scared to fight, and shoots the Staffordshire Bull Terrier which Godfrey used to threaten Wisdom during the earlier altercation as revenge. As a result, Godfrey and his associate destroy Wisdom's car with a baseball bat and drive past his home shouting that he is "dead". Knowing that Godfrey would soon kill him otherwise, Wisdom attempts to kill Godfrey. However, he fails and is seen by Godfrey.

As the two flee from here, Curtis accidentally shoots his friend Rio when Rio suggests they take the gun out and play with it. Their mother when she next sees Ricky, asks him to go home, pack his belongings and leave while they are at church to give Curtis a chance to avoid the gang lifestyle.

Just before heading home, he goes to Wisdom's house to get the money Wisdom told him to take before he left, only to find Wisdom dead, presumably at the hands of his rival, he leaves after sitting there for a long time thinking. As he packs his bags, he asks Curtis to go to the takeaway and get a kebab, and when Curtis returns, his brother has already left. As Ricky is waiting at the train station, mysterious hooded figures are appearing and closing in around Ricky.

As Ricky tries to flee, he is gunned down by Godfrey and his gang. His body is later identified, and the film ends with Curtis reclaiming the gun from where he hid it and throwing it into the river.

== Cast ==
- Ashley Walters as Ricky
- Luke Fraser as Curtis
- Leon Black as Wisdom
- Clare Perkins as Beverley
- Aaron Breakbeat Fagan as Drummer
- Curtis Walker as Leon

== Awards and nominations ==
Year	Award	Category	Recipient(s)	Result
2004	British Independent Film Awards	Most Promising Newcomer	Ashley Walters	Won
2004	British Independent Film Awards	Douglas Hickox Award	Saul Dibb	Nominated
2004	Dinard British Film Festival	Golden Hitchcock	Saul Dibb	Won
2005	Emden International Film Festival	Award of the German Unions Association	Saul Dibb	Won
2006	Evening Standard British Film Awards	Most Promising Newcomer	Saul Dibb	Won
2006	London Critics Circle Film Awards	ALFS Award	Saul Dibb	Nominated

== See also ==
- Murder Mile
- Life and Lyrics
- Kidulthood
- Adulthood
- West 10 LDN
- Top Boy
- Sugarhouse
- List of hood films
