= Mecca2Medina =

- Origin: London, United Kingdom
- Genres: Islamic hip hop, Nasheed
- Years active: 1996–present
- Labels: Crescent Moon Media
- Members: Rakin Fetuga; Ismael Lea South
- Past members: Imran Kazi; Daoud Saifallah; Abdul Kareem Talib
- Website: mecca2medina.net

Mecca2Medina are a British Islamic hip hop Nasheed group.

== History ==
The group was founded in 1996 and produced their first EP, entitled Life After Death, the same year. Since then they have released three nasheed albums, two hip-hop albums, and one mix CD. They make music for both Muslims and non-Muslims. Rakin Fetuga created Mecca2Medina after leaving his previous rap group, Cash Crew in 1995.

== Goal ==
The group aims to make music which expresses their Islamic views and they also comment on social issues related to 'ghetto life'. They rap over a music style which uses African drum rhythms aimed at conservative Islamic audiences, and soulful rhythms and electronic beats for hip-hop fans. The first members to join Fetuga were Ismael Lea South and Imran Kazi. later Doaud Saifallah and Abdul Kareem Talib joined. All of the members converted to Islam apart from Kazi who was born as a Muslim; all five are married with children. As a group of five Mecca2Medina (M2M) performed at many Islamic events around the UK.

== Range ==
Many non-Muslim community organisations also invite them to perform at events. The group contains youth workers Saifallah and South, a social worker Talib, a teacher Fetuga and a civil servant Kazi, these qualifications led the group to do many workshops around the country with disaffected young people and prisoners. The first member to leave the group was Doaud Saifallah. He now works with the youth and is also doing solo Islamic rap music. Kazi was next to leave and now has formed a duo called 'The Planets'. The remaining trio went on for many years and travelled outside of the UK to many countries including Nigeria, USA, France, and Ireland.

== Events ==
They also are community event organizers and use the name 'The Salam Project'. They have organised grassroots events in the community such as talks with prominent Islamic scholars such as Sheikh Abdul Hakim Quick, Shaykh Ahmed Ba'biker Abu Bakr As-Sudani and Sheikh Michael Mumisa. They also have organised Muslim Comedy events with comedians such as Prince Abdi and Jeff Mirza. Along with comedy events they also arrange many tours around the country with the influx of new Islamic rap artists. They have worked with many new artists including with The Blind Alphabets and Mohammed Yahya, Missundastood of the US, Poetic Pilgrimage, Pearls of Islam, Masika Feesibillah and Muslim Belal. They have collaborated on Malaysian group Raihan's album.

Abdul Kareem Talib was the third member to leave the group leaving the duo Fetuga and South. They still perform together whilst also working on solo projects. Fetuga has produced a solo album The Road Less Travelled under the name 'Rakin Niass'. and South organises community events and tours.

== See also ==
- Black British
- British hip hop
- Islamic music
- Nasheed
- List of converts to Islam
- Fun-Da-Mental
- Native Deen
- DAM (band)
- Dirty Kuffar
- Poetic Pilgrimage
