= Starred Up =

2013 film

- Theatrical release poster
- Directed by: David Mackenzie
- Written by: Jonathan Asser
- Produced by: Gillian Berrie
- Starring: Jack O'Connell; Ben Mendelsohn; Rupert Friend; Sam Spruell; Anthony Welsh; David Ajala; Peter Ferdinando; Raphael Sowole; Gilly Gilchrist; Gershwyn Eustache Jnr; Ashley Chin; Tommy McDonnell; Frederick Schmidt
- Cinematography: Michael McDonough
- Edited by: Jake Roberts; Nick Emerson
- Music by: Tony Doogan; David Mackenzie
- Production companies: Film4; Creative Scotland; Quickfire Films; Northern Ireland Screen; LipSync Productions; Sigma Films
- Distributed by: Fox Searchlight Pictures
- Release dates: 30 August 2013 (Telluride Film Festival); 21 March 2014 (United Kingdom)
- Running time: 106 minutes
- Country: United Kingdom
- Language: English
- Box office: $3 million

Starred Up is a 2013 British prison crime drama film directed by David Mackenzie and written by Jonathan Asser. Starring Jack O'Connell, Ben Mendelsohn and Rupert Friend, the film is based on Jonathan Asser's experiences working as a voluntary therapist at HM Prison Wandsworth, with some of the country's most violent criminals. The title refers to the early transfer of a criminal from a Young Offender Institution to an adult prison.

== Plot ==
Eric, 19, is "starred up" from a juvenile prison to a high security adult prison, based on his age and his history of violent behaviour. His father, Neville, is serving a life sentence at this prison, and is a lieutenant for the crime boss that runs the prison. Eric soon begins attacking guards and inmates alike, but is rescued from retribution from the guards by Oliver, a volunteer prison therapist, who convinces Eric to join his therapy group.

The group is composed of black men who also have violent pasts, which they are trying to confront. The sessions often degrade into angry, posturing tirades by members against others, which Oliver de-escalates but uses to help them understand their rage. Eric begins to observe this format, and also bond with the other group members. While his father has ordered him to "learn to behave" from the therapist, he is annoyed by his son "fraternising" with blacks. But when three inmates are paid with drugs to "dunk" Eric in his toilet, one of his black group-mates steps in to save him.

The father and son have an explosive up and down relationship, with the father attempting to instill his dominance, and make Eric follow the prison rules so he can get out. When Eric however attempts to explain his feelings to the uncomfortable Neville, Eric intuits that his father is in a romantic relationship with his cellmate, and is disgusted by it.

The boss, Dennis, appears to begin to mentor Eric, seeing his younger self in Eric. However, Eric is disinterested and ends up attacking Dennis during an argument with Neville. Dennis then orders the prison director to kill Eric. While Neville is telling Dennis that he will not abide the death of his son, prison guards in the basement begin to hang Eric, so it will look like suicide. But when Dennis goes to stab Neville, Neville overpowers him and stabs him, then runs down and rescues Eric.

As Neville is being transferred out, the guards allow father and son a tender moment.

== Cast ==
- Jack O'Connell as Eric Love
- Ben Mendelsohn as Neville Love
- Rupert Friend as Oliver Baumer
- Sam Spruell as Deputy Governor Haynes
- Anthony Welsh as Hassan
- David Ajala as Tyrone
- Peter Ferdinando as Dennis Spencer
- Raphael Sowole as Jago
- Gilly Gilchrist as Principal Officer Scott
- Duncan Airlie James as Officer White
- Gershwyn Eustache Jnr as Des
- Ashley Chin as Ryan
- David Avery as Ashley
- Tommy McDonnell as Officer Self
- Frederick Schmidt as Officer Gentry
- Ian Beattie as Officer Johnson
- Sian Breckin as Governor Cardew

== Production ==
On 8 October 2012 it was confirmed that Mackenzie was attached to direct the film in Northern Ireland, with O'Connell attached to star as the male lead. On a budget of £2 million, shooting was based in former prisons HM Prison Crumlin Road in Belfast and HM Prison Maze in Lisburn, which was a 24-day shoot including 18 days of stunts. Principal photography started on 11 February at Crumlin Road with the post-production scheduled to begin during May.

Financing for Starred Up was provided by Film4 alongside Creative Scotland, Quickfire Films, Northern Ireland Screen and Lip Sync Productions.

== Release ==
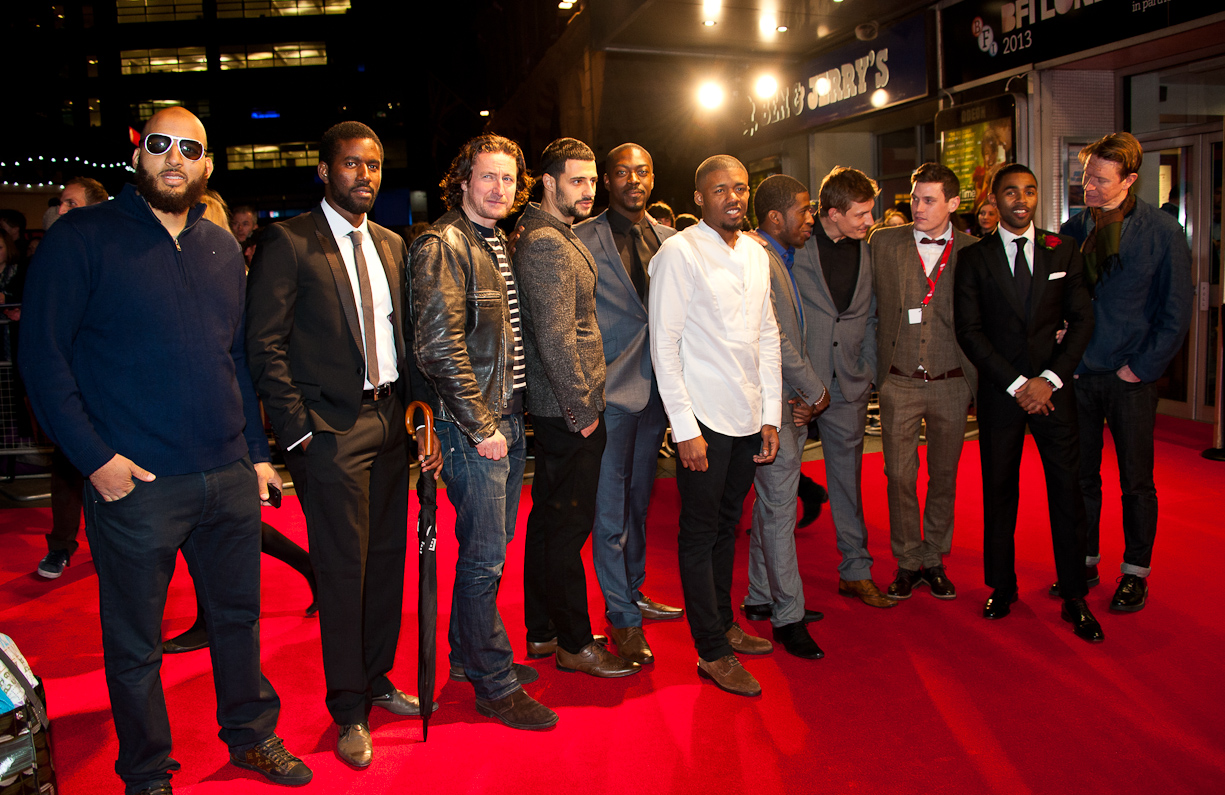
The cast and crew of Starred Up at its BFI London Film Festival premiere in October 2013

Starred Up premiered at the Telluride Film Festival, before screening at the 2013 Toronto International Film Festival on 9 September 2013, where it opened the official sidebar section, Special Presentations, sparking both acclaim and praise, the London Film Festival on 10 October, the Les Arcs Film Festival on 15 December, the International Film Festival Rotterdam on 24 January 2014, and the Tribeca Film Festival.

On 8 October 2013, Fox Searchlight Pictures acquired the distribution rights to Starred Up in the United Kingdom shortly after the screenings at the Telluride Film Festival and the Toronto International Film Festival. On 7 November 2013, Tribeca Film picked up the North American distribution rights to Starred Up, with a planned 2014 theatrical release.

The film was released in the United Kingdom and Ireland on 21 March 2014.

== Reception ==
Starred Up was praised for its acting (particularly for Jack O'Connell, Ben Mendelsohn and Rupert Friend), David Mackenzie's direction, realism and the father-son dynamic of Asser's screenplay. Film review aggregator Rotten Tomatoes reports that 99% out of 116 critical reviews about the film were positive, with an average score of 7.9/10. The website's critical consensus states, "Smart, hard-hitting and queasily realistic, Starred Up is an instant classic“ of UK prison cinema. Metacritic, another review aggregator, assigned the film a weighted average score of 81 out of 100 based on 26 reviews from mainstream critics.

Todd McCarthy of The Hollywood Reporter spoke highly of the piece, particularly the "unpredictable dynamic between Eric and his father Neville", and praised the acting performance of O'Connell, "Young actor Jack O'Connell is the main attraction in this tough British drama", adding, "O'Connell would seem to have live wires running through his whole body and it should be very interesting to follow his career from here on." David Sexton of the Evening Standard praised the film, commenting that, "Starred Up is the finest British-made prison drama for a long time, courting comparison even with the likes of A Man Escaped." Guy Lodge of HitFix was complimentary about O'Connell's performance: "O'Connell's scuzzy charisma and chippy swagger has enlivened a handful of B-level Britpics in the past, though his presence has never been so fearsomely concentrated as it is here."

Peter Debruge of Variety noted praise of Mackenzie, remarking, "Mackenzie isn't attempting to craft a larger-than-life antihero here, but delving into the sociology of this hellish subculture, where prisoners and staff alike coexist in this dehumanizing environment." and that of Asser, "Asser brings more than just realism, however, crafting the central father-son relationship on the foundation of classical Greek tragedy." Tim Robey of The Daily Telegraph commented, "Prison films have always had their share of surrogate father-son bonding, so there's something satisfying about making it biological - it's a shrewd twist in the formula." Tom Huddleston of Time Out stated, "For the most part this is furiously compelling stuff, convincingly mounted and superbly acted."

Rich Cline of Shadows on the Wall, while noting that the piece "deploys cliché in the prison-thriller genre", also opined that "it continually twists its story in more personal directions, which allows the fine cast to create vividly intense characters". Furthermore, praising the acting, "O'Connell delivers a powerfully involving performance that captures Eric's inner emotional energy with remarkable balance", as well as praising the performances of Mendelsohn and Friend. And Mackenzie's "earthy, edgy direction." Lisa Giles-Keddie of HeyUGuys praised Mackenzie's film and the underlying angle, "exploring the miserable fallout of domestic violence on children". She continued by praising the performances of O'Connell and Mendelsohn, citing, "Some outstanding performances from O'Connell and Mendelsohn, both hugely exciting actors in British cinema today." As well as Mackenzie's "commendable direction" and "talent". Jessica Kiang of IndieWire gave the film an "A−" rating, stating, "Starred Up, like its characters, never loses face, never compromises its bloodily-earned hard-man cred, yet its real agenda is one of compassion." and praising the acting, commentating, "Mendelsohn is amazing" and "The supporting cast all do excellent work too, but this is Eric’s story, and so it’s O’Connell’s film. His performance is a revelation." Allan Hunter of Screen International commended the father-son relationship of the piece, "A complex father/son relationship is viewed through a raw depiction of prison life in the riveting Starred Up."

Jason Gorber of Twitch gave the film a "B" rating, stating "Starred Up is a gritty, intense and shockingly unique take on the prison drama genre." Heralds the acting O'Connell and Mendelsohn, "O'Connell's performance is one of the finest of the year, and Mendelsohn once again demonstrates his unique brand of cold hearted intensity.", as well as Asser's screenplay, "Asser captures life in the system with enormous clarity." And notes the depth in its execution, "Shakespearean in its levels of violence and manipulation". Anton Bitel of Eye for Film stated, "McKenzie's [film comes with] high ambition in the pecking order of the prison flick - a subgenre known to be overcrowded, hierarchically organised and unforgivingly hostile to any weaker new entries." Adding, "Clichés are avoided by the complicated characterisation of both Neville and Oliver."

Emma Simmonds of The List spoke positively and commented, "Starred Up gives you a good sharp shake and, in doing so, truly opens your eyes". Describing Asser's script as "authentically abrasive and peppered with welcome snatches of humour" and both Mackenzie and cinematographer Michael McDonough as being able to "capture the volatility of the environment without surrendering sensitivity to character". Chris Bumbray of JoBlo.com was most praising of the piece, especially the acting performances. In regard to Mendelsohn he stated, "[Mendelsohn] manages to hold his own opposite O'Connell's almost Brando-like performance." And of O'Connell, "O'Connell is brilliant, managing to give Eric a kind of Bronson-like intensity, although they keep him sympathetic in that it's clear that his rage is a by-product of a vicious upbringing."

Eric Kohn of IndieWire gave the piece an "A−" rating, commenting of director Mackenzie, "Pushing beyond the brutal exterior of his material, Mackenzie reveals the tender story of estrangement beneath, but never forces the sentimentality." And additional, "British director David Mackenzie's gradually affecting "Starred Up" has all those ingredients but uses them for more precise means that merely revealing the harsh nature of life behind bars. Mackenzie applies a sharp kitchen sink realism to this haunting setting and directs it toward an ultimately moving family drama that just happens to involve vicious convicts."

Mark Kermode of The Observer gave a positive review, commenting, "Mackenzie keeps us grounded in the maze of prison life, coaxing powerful performances from his cast, each apparently encouraged and emboldened to find their own space." Speaking highly of Friend's performance as "terrifically edgy" and describing O'Connell's as "[An] electrified and electrifying performance" furthering such a statement by remarking "there's a hint of the young Malcolm McDowell about him". He concludes by praising cinematographer Michael McDonough's ability to "[capture] the claustrophobia of the physical environment without reducing the characters within the frame".

== Awards and nominations ==
Award	Date of ceremony	Category	Recipients and nominees	Result
British Independent Film Awards	8 December 2013	Best British Independent Film		Nominated
British Independent Film Awards	8 December 2013	Best Director	David Mackenzie	Nominated
British Independent Film Awards	8 December 2013	Best Actor	Jack O'Connell	Nominated
British Independent Film Awards	8 December 2013	Best Supporting Actor	Ben Mendelsohn	Won
British Independent Film Awards	8 December 2013	Best Supporting Actor	Rupert Friend	Nominated
British Independent Film Awards	8 December 2013	Best Screenplay	Jonathan Asser	Nominated
British Independent Film Awards	8 December 2013	Best Achievement in Production		Nominated
British Independent Film Awards	8 December 2013	Best Technical Achievement	Shaheen Baig	Nominated
Dublin International Film Festival	22 February 2014	Best Actor	Jack O'Connell	Won
Irish Film & Television Awards	5 April 2014	Best Editing	Jake Roberts, Nick Emerson	Nominated
London Film Festival	8 January 2014	Best Film		Nominated
London Film Festival	8 January 2014	Best British Newcomer	Jonathan Asser	Won
