= Adelayo Adedayo =

English actress (born 1988)

- Born: 18 December 1988 (age 37); Dagenham, London
- Education: Brunel University (BA)
- Occupation: Actress
- Years active: 2007–present

Adelayo Adedayo (/ˌædəˈlaɪoʊ ˌædəˈdaɪoʊ/; born 18 December 1988) is a British actress. She is known for her roles in the TV series Some Girls (2012–2014), Timewasters (2017–2019), and The Responder (2022–2024).

== Early life and education ==
Adelayo Adedayo was born in London on 18 December 1988. She is of Yoruba Nigerian descent, and grew up in Dagenham.

She trained part-time at Identity School of Acting while studying law at Brunel University.

== Career ==
Adedayo made her feature film debut in Sket (2011).

On television, she became known for her roles in the BBC Three sitcom Some Girls (2012–2014) and the ITV2 series Timewasters (2017–2019).

She plays a rookie police officer, co-starring with Martin Freeman, in the BBC One series The Responder, with the first series airing in 2022.

== Awards and nominations ==
In 2023 Adedayo was nominated for a British Academy Television Award for her performance in The Responder.

== Filmography ==
=== Film ===
Year	Film	Character	Notes	Ref(s)
2011	Sket	Kerry		
2013	Gone Too Far!	Paris		
2017	Unlocked	Noma		

=== Television ===
Year	Programme	Character	Notes	Ref(s)
2007	The Bill	Estelle Makobi	1 episode	
2010	Skins	Andrea	1 episode	
2011	M.I. High	Agent Suki	1 episode	
2012–2014	Some Girls	Viva Bennett	Main role; 18 episodes	
2014	Law & Order: UK	Kayla	Series 8	
2017–2019	Timewasters	Lauren	Main role	
2018	Origin	Agnes "Lee" Lebachi	Recurring role	
2019	The Capture	Alma Dahmani	Recurring role	
2022–2024	The Responder	Rachel Hargreaves	Recurring role	
2024	Supacell	Dionne	Main role	
