= Sumotherhood =

2023 British comedy film directed by Adam Deacon

- Theatrical release poster
- Directed by: Adam Deacon
- Written by: Adam Deacon; Michael Vu; Jazzie Zonzolo
- Produced by: Finn Bruce; Adam Deacon; Jazzie Zonzolo
- Starring: Adam Deacon; Jazzie Zonzolo; Leomie Anderson; Danny Sapani; Richie Campbell; London Hughes; Vas Blackwood; Kobna Holdbrook-Smith; Jaime Winstone; Peter Serafinowicz; Jennifer Saunders; Ed Sheeran
- Cinematography: Simon Stolland
- Edited by: Ash White; Mark Williams
- Music by: Chad Hobson
- Production companies: Piece of Pie Productions; Belstone Pictures; Deaconstructed; Finn Cardigan Bruce Productions Group
- Distributed by: Paramount Pictures
- Release date: 13 October 2023
- Running time: 97 minutes
- Country: United Kingdom
- Language: English
- Box office: $3.1 million

Sumotherhood is a 2023 British action comedy film directed by Adam Deacon, who also stars in the film alongside Richie Campbell, Leomie Anderson in her feature film debut, Kobna Holdbrook-Smith, Danny Sapani, Peter Serafinowicz, Jaime Winstone, London Hughes and Vas Blackwood, and includes cameos from Jennifer Saunders, Ed Sheeran, and Jeremy Corbyn. It was released theatrically on 13 October 2023 where it received mixed reviews from critics.

== Plot ==
Riko and Kane are two friends that live together in an East London flat and dream of being taken seriously as roadmen. They owe a debt of £15,000 to a local Indian crime family, the Patels. Kane failed to get the money when, when unsuccessfully attempting to sell drugs to a Somali gang, was instead beaten up. They devise a plan to get the money to pay them back. First, they attempt to sell a mobile phone to two other men, but they decline as it was meant to be a gun (Kane mistook the word "strap"). The second attempt has them trying to rob the rapper Lethal Bizzle, but they end up getting knocked out, stripped and embarrassed in front of everyone while a Link Up TV cameraman records. The video goes viral and makes the two a laughing stock.

For a third attempt, they hold up the local bank but after an argument, they accidentally reveal their identities. A man named Leo ignores their commands and dares Riko to shoot him. After arguing with Leo, he passes out from a heart attack. This gains Riko attention after apparently shooting Leo and earning him the nickname, "Rambo Riko". It also sparks interest in gang leader, Shotti who sends him, Kane and a member called Dwayne to retrieve a bag of drugs and money from a nightclub.

Riko gets distracted by a girl named Tamara with whom he falls in love. A fight breaks out between Riko, Kane and members of another gang. The two win the fight and escape. Riko explains his bipolar disorder to Dwayne and the two form a bond when he reveals that he is autistic. They then realise that they forgot the bag from the club but before they can go back for it, they are chased by a police officer named Ian and his partner, Bill. After crashing the car, Riko and Kane are caught but Dwayne escapes.

At the police station, Riko calls Tamara who happens to be the stepsister of Leo who has woken up from his heart attack. Leo thanks Riko and tells him that he has decided to quit his gang life and has become a Christian. Unfortunately, Leo's unstable brother, Tyreese, vows revenge against Riko and rages after he finds out the relationship between him and Tamara. Tyreese goes on the hunt for Riko, even running a policeman over after mistaking the latter for him. Riko and Kane are released and go back to Shotti where they reveal that they forgot the bag, infuriating him. After Shotti is informed that they beat up a member from a rival gang, they reconcile. Shotti lets them tag along for a deal at a warehouse with Polish gangsters.

Tamara calls Riko and asks for them to meet up, but this is a trap set by Tyreese. At the warehouse, somehow Ian and Bill arrive and poorly attempt to be the Polish dealers. Tyreese's gang arrive along with Tamara and Riko reveals to Tyreese that he did not mean to hurt Leo, angering Shotti. The hate against Riko is pushed further when they discover a police pen with a built-in microphone and GPRS in his coat pocket, leading everyone to believe that he is working for the police, including Kane.

Ian starts a gunfight after Riko reveals that he gave him the pen, causing many gang members to die in the process. Riko and Kane make up and take part in the gunfight leading to Riko getting shot. Kane and Tamara help him and try to escape from the warehouse. Shotti attempts to stop them but is knocked out by Dwayne. Dwayne steals Shotti's bag full of drugs and money and the four escape as the police arrive. DI Brookes tells Ian off for going rogue and causing mayhem throughout the city. After she informs him about a sexual misconduct complaint involving him, she sacks him and tasers him in the testicles.

The Patels break into Riko and Kane's home to find them gone and they have paid them back in rupees, enraging the leader. Riko, Kane, Tamara and Dwayne leave Britain and escape to a new life in Los Angeles.

In a post-credits scene, Shotti, in a police interrogation room, watches a social media video of Riko and Kane dancing with the money and looks at the camera annoyed.

== Cast ==
- Adam Deacon as Richard "Riko" Oshlam Byaseff Bulouck
- Jazzie Zonzolo as Kane Patrick Armand Ketende
- Richie Campbell as Theodore "Tyreese" DeMarco
- Leomie Anderson as Tamara
- Kobna Holdbrook-Smith as Shotti
- Arnold Jorge as Dwayne
- Danny Sapani as Leo DeMarco
- Vas Blackwood as PC Ian
- Barry McNicholl as PC Bill
- Jennifer Saunders as DI Brookes
- Eddie Kadi as a traffic attendant
- London Hughes as Rowanda
- Peter Serafinowicz as Krzysztof
- Ed Sheeran as Crack Ed
- Jaime Winstone as Sarah
- Tamzin Outhwaite as an ambulance worker
- Denise van Outen as a nurse
- Jammer as Murkle Man
- Babatunde Aléshé as PC Williams
- Megaman as Killi
- Lethal Bizzle as himself
- Charlie Sloth as himself
- Nick Collier (Ella Vaday) as himself
- Rapman as himself
- Michael Vu as himself
- Jeremy Corbyn as himself

== Reception ==
The Guardian rated the film 1 star (out of a possible 5) and commented that "any stabs at thematic seriousness have an incongruous feel".

The Independent and Telegraph both scored it 3 stars and described it as "overstuffed" and a "shambles" respectively.

It was a box office success, making $3.1 million as of 3 December 2023.
