= The Intent 2: The Come Up =

The Intent 2
- Directed by: Femi Oyeniran; Nicky "Slimting" Walker
- Starring: Ghetts; Dylan Dufus; Shone Romulus; Nicky "Slimting" Walker; Femi Oyeniran; Ashley Chin; Popcaan; Sharon Duncan-Brewster; Krept and Konan
- Release date: 21 September 2018
- Running time: 103 minutes
- Country: United Kingdom
- Languages: English; Patois
- Budget: $128,615
- Box office: $573,194

The Intent 2: The Come Up (also known as The Intent 2) is a 2018 British crime thriller film directed by, written by and starring Femi Oyeniran. It stars Ghetts in the lead role with Dylan Dufus and Ashley Chin reprising their role from the first film. It is the prequel to The Intent.

== Plot ==
Jay (Ghetts) has big dreams, but his hopes are maimed by his allegiance to both his crew and Hackney crime boss Beverley (Sharon Duncan-Brewster). Jay sets about setting the grounds for his own organised crime ring with the help of Mustafa (Adam Deacon). Things are progressing well until Beverley discovers his treachery, and an ill-fated burglary in North London and a trip to Jamaica rips the crew apart. Whilst their operations are being watched by an undercover Police officer Gunz (Dylan Duffus), who has been used to integrate himself into the crew.

== Cast ==
- Ghetts as Jay
- Dylan Dufus as Gunz
- Ashley Chin as G Money
- Adam Deacon as Mustafa
- Shone Romulus as D'Angel
- Femi Oyeniran as Mitch
- Nicky Slimting Walker as Shane
- Fekky as Blacks
- Krept as Daniel
- Konan as Leon
- Popcaan as Soursop
- Tanika Bailey as Peaches
- Sharon Duncan-Brewster as Beverley
- Lady Leshurr (cameo)
- Yxng Bane (cameo)
- Karen Bryson as Sergeant Walker
- Sarah Akokhia as Sergeant Rebecca Smith
- Selva Rasalingam as Mehmet
- Jay Brown as DCI Mckenzie
- Minaj as Minaj
- Wasim Nawaz as Jamal
- Steve Middle (extra)

== Critical reception ==
The film received a 2/5 from The Guardian who described the film as "a near-fatal combination of creative ADHD and directorial ego yanks us away from these strengths and back towards these films’ dunderheaded raison d’etre: giving posturing musicians-not-quite-turned-actors the chance to engage in generally indifferent gunplay."

== Proposed sequel ==
In an interview, Femi stated that he'd like to do a third film as the original movie ended on a cliffhanger, he said that this one has to do well in the box office first. On 25 January 2020, it was announced on The Intent's Instagram page that Scorcher will return as Hoods in the third film and Digga D will be joining the acting team.
