= Asad Ahmad =

British journalist and news presenter

Asad Ahmad (born 28 November 1969) is a British journalist and news presenter.

== Early life and education ==
Ahmad was born on 28 November 1969 to Pakistani parents in London. He was educated at The John Roan School on Maze Hill in Blackheath, southeast London, followed by the University of Bristol, where he studied law.

Before his media career, Ahmad worked as a Foreign Exchange dealer in the City of London, and as a researcher in the House of Lords.

== BBC News ==
Ahmad began his media career at the BBC on the News Trainee Scheme in 1996 before working at BBC Birmingham as a Political Reporter and TV Presenter on BBC Midlands Today. Before joining BBC London, Ahmad presented editions of BBC Scotland's flagship news programme Reporting Scotland as well as news bulletins on BBC Breakfast. He was one of the launch presenters and correspondents for Newsnight Scotland. He became the BBC's Scotland correspondent, during which time he covered the Foot and Mouth outbreak, and riots in the North of England.

Ahmad moved to London to work as a reporter for BBC Breakfast before joining the presenting team with Moira Stuart, Jeremy Bowen, Sophie Raworth, Sarah Montague and Darren Jordon. He also presented the News round-up on Breakfast with Frost and rolling news on BBC News with Sian Williams.

== Other activities ==
Ahmad is an ambassador for the Prince of Wales's Mosaic charity. He is also an ambassador for the Prince of Wales's British Asian Trust. Ahmad has become involved in a working party looking at homelessness in the capital. He has appeared on radio presenting on the BBC Asian Network. He has also previously presented the Newsdrive programme on BBC Radio Scotland, and he has been shortlisted several times for awards for his special reports on BBC Radio.

Other programmes Ahmad has presented include a late night discussion programme for BBC Choice, Newsline Scotland, East for BBC2, music and current affairs programmes including a Pakistan earthquake special programme for BBC1.

Ahmad was invited by the US State Department to take part in their International Visitor Leadership Programme in 2006, where he delivered lectures. He is also a patron of the charity Working With Words.

== Honours ==
Ahmad was the 2006 Royal Television Society Reporter of the Year for London. He has been nominated for a BAFTA for News Programme of the Year and was shortlisted for an Ethnic Multicultural Media Awards (EMMA) for Best Radio News Journalist.

== Personal life ==
In 2007, Ahmad faced an allegation of harassment which he strongly denied, stating that the allegation was "false". He refused offers of a caution by the Metropolitan Police, opting to take the case to court. The Crown Prosecution Service offered no evidence and forensic evidence cleared Ahmad of any wrongdoing. He was told he could leave the court "without a stain on his character". The CPS was ordered to pay Ahmad's legal costs.

Ahmad was due to run the 2008 London Marathon in aid of WaterAid, but had to pull out due to sustaining a knee injury. Ahmad suffered a motorcycle accident in 2008, sustaining a serious head and brain injury. He now often uses a walking stick to help his overall balance.
