= Life and Lyrics =

2006 British film by Richard Laxton

Life and Lyrics and Life
- CD cover for soundtrack album
- Directed by: Richard Laxton
- Written by: Ken Williams
- Produced by: Esther Douglas; Fiona Neilson
- Starring: Ashley Walters; Louise Rose; Chris Steward; Robbie Gee
- Cinematography: John Daly
- Edited by: Tracey Wadmore-Smith
- Music by: Various
- Production company: BBC Films
- Distributed by: United International Pictures
- Release dates: August 2006 (Edinburgh); 29 September 2006
- Running time: 99 minutes
- Country: United Kingdom
- Language: English

Life and Lyrics is a 2006 British film directed by Richard Laxton and starring Ashley Walters, a former member of the garage band So Solid Crew.

A variation on the Romeo and Juliet theme, it is set in modern-day South London. It tells the story of two rival crews of DJs and what happens when a member of one crew falls for a member of another. The Motion Crew are a group of south London rappers led by DJ Danny 'D-Biz' Lewis (Ashley Walters). For Danny, his music is everything and his crew are like family. But loyalties are put to the test when Danny falls for the beautiful Carmen, whom he soon finds out is related to a member of their most hated rivals, the violent and arrogant Hard Cash Crew. Both crews seem certain to face each other in the rap battle finals of the prestigious Mic Masters competition, a thrilling event that will offer a final chance for Danny to beat his rivals and make it big.

Life and Lyrics premiered at the 2006 Edinburgh International Film Festival.
