= Anuvahood =

2011 British urban comedy film directed by Adam Deacon

- Theatrical release poster
- Directed by: Adam Deacon; Daniel Toland
- Written by: Adam Deacon; Michael Vu
- Produced by: Nick Taussig; Paul Van Carter; Daniel Toland; Terry Stone
- Starring: Adam Deacon; Jazzie Zonzolo; Femi Oyeniran; Ollie Barbieri; Wil Johnson; Ashley Walters
- Cinematography: Felix Wiedemann
- Edited by: Seth Bergstrom
- Music by: Chad Hobson
- Production companies: Gunslinger; Gateway Films; Cabin Fever Films; Creativity Media
- Distributed by: Revolver Entertainment
- Release date: 18 March 2011
- Running time: 89 Minutes
- Country: United Kingdom
- Language: English
- Box office: £2.2 million

Anuvahood is a 2011 British urban comedy film directed by Adam Deacon, who also plays the film's lead character. It also stars Paul Kaye, Wil Johnson, Ollie Barbieri, Femi Oyeniran, Jocelyn Jee Esien, and Ashley Walters. Critics of the film received it negatively, although it had a strong box-office opening. The film released worldwide on 18 March 2011.

Anuvahood is a parody of films in the vein of urban films such as Kidulthood, Adulthood, and Shank, all of which Deacon starred in.

== Plot ==
The story follows Kenneth (Adam Deacon) who likes to call himself "K". He has an ambition of becoming a grime MC, and has already created his debut mixtape, Feel The Pain. However, nobody has bought a single copy and Kenneth works, for now, at local supermarket Laimsbury's to help pay his family's rent. When his boss insults him at work for trying to be a rapper, he quits and his mother berates him for failing to pay the house rent and his family is soon threatened by bailiffs.

Kenneth cannot take seeing his mother hassled by the bailiffs and leaves the house when he befriends Spanish exchange student, Enrique (Ollie Barbieri). They begin to sell illegal drugs with Kenneth's friends Bookie (Femi Oyeniran), Lesoi (Michael Vu), and TJ (Jazzie Zonzolo). When local badman Tyrone (Richie Campbell) investigates Kenneth, he steals Kenneth's and his friends' accessories. His friends leave him and his family do not support him, so Kenneth slyly breaks into Tyrone's house to steal back their stuff.

While Tyrone cheats on his baby's mother in the other room, Kenneth sneaks into his apartment to steal everyone's stuff back and alert Tyrone's baby's mother to his cheating and she catches him in the act. Later, Tyrone finds out and comes after Kenneth. Tyrone attacks Kenneth, and his friends try to help him, but Tyrone manages to scare them away, making it a one-on-one fight. Kenneth shockingly fights back and takes Tyrone down.

After the humiliation, Tyrone's boss arrives and witnesses Tyrone hitting kids, therefore sacks him and insults him in front of the entire hood. But to make matters worse, Tyrone's baby's mother's brother appears on the scene to punish him further for cheating on his sister, and Tyrone flees in humiliation.

Kenneth is offered a record deal but instead gets his job back at Laimsbury's and helps pay his family's rent.

== Cast ==
- Adam Deacon as Kenneth "K" O'Sullivan-Fletcher
- Femi Oyeniran as Bookie
- Ollie Barbieri as Enrique Estaban De La Fuente
- Jazzie Zonzolo as T.J.
- Michael Vu as Lesoi
- Richie Campbell as Tyrone
- Jaime Winstone as Yasmin
- Paul Kaye as Tony
- Ashley Walters as Cracks
- Terry Stone as Terry
- Eddie Kadi as Tunde
- Perry Benson as Brian
- Linda Robson as Pauline
- Richard Blackwood as Russell
- Wil Johnson as Mike
- Jason Maza as Darren
- Carmell Roche as Kesha
- Jocelyn Jee Esien as Tasha
- Ashley Chin as Mo
- Michael Maris as Big T
- Alex Macqueen as Edward
- Doon Mackichan as Patricia
- Aisleyne Horgan-Wallace as Maria
- Levi Roots as Himself (special appearance during intro credits)
- Jahmek Power as Murkleman

== Reception ==
On the review aggregator website Rotten Tomatoes, 15% of 13 critics' reviews are positive, with an average rating of 3.2/10.

== Sequel ==
Adam Deacon teased the possibility of a sequel in 2016. He tweeted the news which read "Happy to say it's on its way". Although not much had been said about the sequel in a while, Deacon confirmed in January 2018 to return with co-star and writer buddies Jazzie Zonzolo and Michael Vu, as well as announcing that the sequel is set to be titled Sumotherhood. Adam Deacon also hosted the Anuvahood: The Sequel show at Project Romford in promotion of the upcoming release. Filming began in July 2021 and is expected to be released in 2023. Jazzie Zonzolo, Adam Deacon and Richie Campbell are set to return in the sequel.

A trailer for the sequel was released on 30 August 2023 highlighting cameo appearances from Ed Sheeran and Jeremy Corbyn. The film was released theatrically on 13 October 2023.
