= Boonaa Mohammed =

- Born: April 14, 1987 (age 39); Hararghe, Ethiopia
- Origin: Toronto, Canada
- Genres: Spoken word
- Occupations: Poet, writer, Media professional
- Instrument: Vocals
- Years active: 2007–present
- Website: www.boonaa.com

Boonaa Mohammed (born April 14, 1987) is a Canadian spoken-word poet and writer of Oromo descent.

== Early life ==
Mohammed is a second generation Ethiopian immigrant of Oromo ancestry. His parents came to Canada as political refugees seeking asylum in the country after their involvement with the Oromo Liberation Front (OLF) in Ethiopia.

He grew up in the down-town Toronto area and was heavily involved in the street life while attending Oakwood Collegiate Institute. He graduated at the top of his class and was named Valedictorian before enrolling in Ryerson University (now Toronto Metropolitan University) and graduating from the Radio and Television Arts program in 2011.

== Career ==
In 2007, Mohammed won the Canadian Broadcasting Corporation Poetry Face-Off "Best New Artist" award. He also has a playwright residency at Theatre Passe Muraille in Toronto. He has appeared on TedX Toronto and has had a short story published in a Penguin Canada anthology called "Piece by Piece"

Besides poetry and theatre, Mohammed is the founder of Safina Media, an Islamic media production company and has continued the art of story-telling through various platforms of media.
