= Femi Oyeniran =

Nigerian-British actor and director

- Born: 31 December 1986 (age 39); Lagos, Nigeria
- Occupations: Actor, Director, Producer, Writer
- Known for: Kidulthood; Adulthood; The Intent; Taking Stock; Anuvahood
- Children: 2

Femi Oyeniran is a Nigerian-British actor and director who started his career in Kidulthood, playing the role of "Moony" in 2006. It was followed by the 2008 sequel Adulthood. His first feature film as a director It's A Lot was released theatrically by Kaleidoscope Home Entertainment in 2013. Oyeniran sold his second movie The Intent to Netflix for a worldwide release; it appeared on the platform on 15 May 2017. The film had already peaked at number three on the iTunes Movie Chart and opened to sold out cinemas. It was funded, shot and distributed completely independently.

== Career ==
Oyeniran's TV appearances include ITV's Golden Hour, Channel 4's The Ghost Squad and BBC's Absolutely Fabulous. His theatre debut was at the Hackney Empire in a two-hander called Basic. He has appeared on news channels BBC News 24 and Sky News, BBC Breakfast, BBC Radio 4's Today Programme and the BBC Asian Network to discuss youth culture in London. He was involved in an organization called Smart Justice for Young People, which looked at alternative modes of punishing petty crime. This led to him being asked to make a TV report for BBC 2's The Daily Politics Programme. In July 2006, he accepted a request to speak alongside David Cameron at a Centre for Social Justice Event. In 2009, Fresh Off The Boat became Oyeniran's first foray into film directing. The film was nominated as part of the 2009 Film London 'Best of Boroughs' awards.

He produces and hosts an online panel chat show and podcast called Cut the Chat; it sees Oyeniran along with his friends DJ Ace, Damon the barber and comedian Littleman tackle trivia as well as profound issues. The show has proven a success with sold-out tours around the country as well as live shows at the Camden Roundhouse and the Tate Britain. The podcast is published once a week on YouTube, Soundcloud and on the Apple podcast app.

As an actor, he is best known for his roles as 'Moony' in Kidulthood and its sequel Adulthood, as well as 'Bookie', in a comedy spin-off Anuvahood, a film made by Adam Deacon. It's A Lot, which he co-wrote, co-directed and co-produced was released in Spring 2013. (UK). In 2014, he produced a ten-part series for Sky Living called Venus vs. Mars, which aired in April 2015. In the same year, he directed the short film Red Room, and starred alongside Kelly Brook and Georgia Groome in Taking Stock by award-winning director Maeve Murphy. He also played the lead in Film London-funded City Lights. 2016 saw Oyeniran independently release the feature film The Intent, which he co-wrote, co-produced and co-directed with Nicky 'Slimting' Walker. The film was received positively as a story with "confidence and style". In November 2016, he executive produced ITV2 comedy Dropperz, and went on to work as assistant producer on Kudos/Sky Atlantic series Tin Star. The prequel to the 2016 hit The Intent, The Intent 2: The Come Up (Co-Written, Produced & Directed alongside Nicky Slimting Walker) stood tall at the box-office on its opening weekend (21 September 2018), opening as the No. 1 film in several of the UK's biggest Cinemas (Odeon Greenwich, Showcase Newham, Odeon Luxe Birmingham Broadway Plaza, Odeon Surrey Quays and Showcase Walsall), and enjoying the second highest screen average that weekend. It is now available on Netflix. The film won Best UK Movie at the Mvisa awards. It also won big at the National Film Awards, picking up three awards, including "Best Action Film". Oyeniran also wrote episode 5 of the Netflix series Turn Up Charlie, which featured Idris Elba playing the lead.

Oyeniran wrote and produced the feature film The Intent It starred Scorcher, Krept and Konan, Shone Romulus, Jade Asha and Dylan Duffus. The film won Best feature at the BT British Urban Film Festival awards in 2017.

In addition to his work in film, television and theatre, Oyeniran has delivered a series of workshops to young people in Young Offenders Institutions. In 2014, Oyeniran was invited to give a TEDxParliament Talk on the theme of democracy, which was inspired by his extensive work with young offenders. He also sat as a Commissioner on the Speaker of the House of Commons' Commission on Digital Democracy Commission, which explored modes of improving democratic participation through the use of technology.

== Political views ==
Oyeniran has an interest in politics. In 2017, Oyeniran worked with the team that created the #Grime4Corbyn hashtag. The aim of the grassroots campaign was to galvanise young people on social media and endorse the Labour Party leader Jeremy Corbyn in the 2017 UK general election. Oyeniran explained that the movement has plans far beyond the 8 June vote, saying: "The long-term aim is for it to go beyond the election, it's not just about what happens with Jeremy Corbyn in (this) election. It's about youth engagement, it's about young people caring about politics, it's about young people taking action for things they’re not happy about around them. So it's much more than Corbyn."

== Personal life ==
Oyeniran, was born in Nigeria He moved to London when he was ten and was raised in Islington, North London. He attended St Aloysius' College, St Charles Catholic Sixth Form College and studied law at the London School of Economics.

In addition to acting and filmmaking, Oyeniran is a keen Manchester United football fan. He is a Christian and a married father of two.
