= Islam Expo =

Islamic exhibition held in London in 2006 and 2008

Islam Expo is an Islamic exhibition held in London in July 2006 and July 2008. In 2006 it was held at the Alexandra Palace in London, a city with a large Muslim population and it was described as being the largest Islamic exhibition ever held in Europe.

There were stalls by Islamic businesses and charities like Muslim Hands and Islamic Relief. There was also stalls selling Islamic music, clothing, food and books. There was also opportunities to get free henna tattoos and your name written in Arabic. There was also an interactive section on the Five Pillars of Islam, an exhibition of young British Islamic art, and a section on famous Islamic scientists and mathematicians. There was also a fun fair in the grounds and lectures by various people from within and outside the Islamic population like Mayor of London Ken Livingstone, singer Yusuf Islam, formerly known as Cat Stevens and Muslim BBC news reporter Asad Ahmad. There was screenings of Islamic films, and Islamic musicians.

== Aims ==
The aims of the exposition were to:

- Introduce the British public to Islam as a global culture and faith that spans continents, races and languages.
- Shed light over the Islamic empires’ great achievements in the various fields of knowledge; from science to technology and from art to literature. Many of these were by converts (reluctant or otherwise) to Islam during its period of empire.
- Create stronger foundations for Muslims to understand their heritage and develop their identity.
- Purportedly combat the myths, misconceptions and misunderstanding of Islam.
- Encourage positive interaction between Muslims and the different races and cultures of British society, working towards a more open, tolerant and pluralistic Britain.
- Promote multiculturalism.

== Guest speakers ==
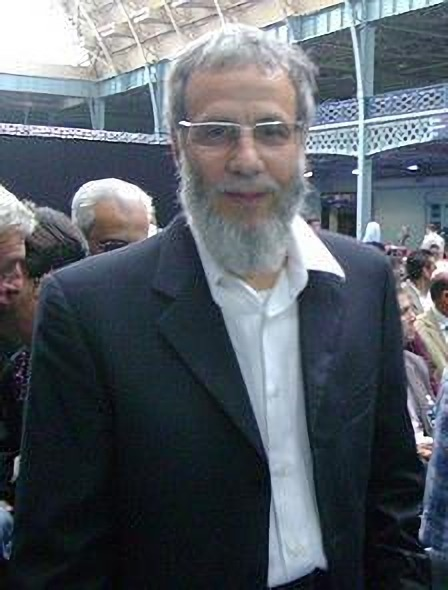
Yusuf Islam appearing at the Islam Expo in London, (2008)

A number of guest speakers made lectures at the 2006 expo including:

- Asad Ahmad, BBC journalist and news presenter
- Norman Kember, former hostage in Iraq
- Yusuf Islam, former pop star Cat Stevens
- Sadiq Khan, British MP
- Muhammad Abdul Bari, Secretary General of the Muslim Council of Britain
- Rageh Omaar, journalist of Al Jazeera, author
- Wadah Khanfar, Director General of Al Jazeera Network
- Yasmin Alibhai Brown, Ugandan-born British journalist and author
- Ken Livingstone, Mayor of London 2000-2008
- Tariq Ramadan, Teacher of Islamic Theology at Oxford University
- Seumas Milne, British journalist, writer
- Peter Oborne, British journalist, author, commentator
