= The Intent =

Film by Femi Oyeniran and Kalvadour Peterson

- Directed by: Femi Oyeniran; Kalvadour Peterson
- Starring: Dylan Dufus; Scorcher; Shone Romulus; Femi Oyeniran; Ashley Chin; Krept and Konan
- Release date: 25 July 2016
- Running time: 104 minutes
- Country: United Kingdom
- Language: English

The Intent is a 2016 British crime thriller film directed by, written by and starring Femi Oyeniran.

== Plot ==
A small-time criminal called Hoodz finds success robbing stores and small businesses, finally catching the jackpot by attacking a big drug dealer for his stash of money and drugs. Gunz, an undercover police officer posing as a member in his squad, is failing to make regular contact to his commanding officers and is increasingly becoming extremely content with the idea of being one of the members in Hoodz's crew. The police begin to view him as a suspect like all the rest.

== Cast ==
- Scorcher as Hoodz
- Jade Asha as Naeema
- Dylan Dufus as Gunz
- Shone Romulus as D'Angel
- Femi Oyeniran as Mitch
- Ashley Chin as G Money
- Nicky Slimting Walker as Shane (as Nicky Slimting)
- Fekky as Blacks
- Krept as Daniel
- Konan as Leon
- Sarah Akokhia as Sergeant Rebecca Smith

== Prequel ==
A prequel titled The Intent 2: The Come Up was released in 2018.
