= Naseeha =

Naseeha (Arabic: نصيحة, romanized: Naṣīḥa) is the Arabic word for advice. It can also mean recommendation or sincerity (particularly in Islamic contexts). The Islamic prophet Muhammad described deen (religion) as naseeha (advice, sincerity, good counsel). Seeking naseeha (especially from older people with more life experience) is looked upon positively, as an act of devotion rather than a lack of it or of knowledge. Naseeha is encouraged to be said in a positive kind way, in private to prevent the exploitation of the receiver's actions.
