= Poetic Pilgrimage =

- Origin: London, United Kingdom
- Genres: Islamic hip hop
- Years active: 2002–present
- Members: Muneera Rashida; Sukina Abdul Noor

Poetic Pilgrimage is a British Muslim hip-hop duo, founded by Muneera Rashida and Sukina Abdul Noor in 2002.

== Hip Hop Hijabis documentary ==
Hip Hop Hijabis is a 2015 Al Jazeera documentary about Poetic Pilgrimage, directed by filmmaker Mette Reitzel. The aim of the documentary is to educate a chosen demographic about the constraints of being female within the Hip Hop genre. Al-Jazeera called it "a universal story about friendship, love and idealism, and two young women finding their place in the world."

== Discography ==
Year	Title
2009	Freedom Times
2010	Starwomen Mixtape
2011	Silence is Consent (with Mohammed Yahya)

== Press coverage ==
1. New Statesman:
2. Al-Ahram Weekly:
3. The Independent:
4. NRK (Norway):
