= Saul Dibb =

British film director and screenwriter (born 1968)

- Born: John Saul Dibb; 18 August 1968 (age 57); Barnes, London, England
- Occupations: Film director, screenwriter
- Years active: 1997–present
- Spouse: Kira Phillips
- Children: 3
- Parent(s): Elizabeth and Mike Dibb

Saul Dibb (born 18 August 1968) is an English director and screenwriter. His father is the documentary maker Mike Dibb.

Born in London, England, Saul Dibb is a graduate of the University of East Anglia. He is best known for co-writing and directing Bullet Boy, for which he was nominated for the Douglas Hickox Award, The Line of Beauty, and The Duchess, which won the Academy Award for Best Costume in 2009. In 2016, he directed the adaptation for BBC2 of Zadie Smith's bestselling novel NW into a 90-minute television film of the same name, starring Nikki Amuka-Bird and Phoebe Fox. Dibb directed a film adaptation of R. C. Sherriff's 1928 play Journey's End, which was released in 2017. This has been dubbed "The best ever film about the Great War" by The Times.

== Filmography ==
Film

- Bullet Boy (2004)
- The Duchess (2008)
- Suite Française (2014)
- Journey's End (2017)

Television

- The Line of Beauty (2006) – 3 episodes
- NW (2016)
- Dublin Murders (2019) – 2 episodes
- The Salisbury Poisonings (2020) – 3 episodes
- The Sixth Comandment (2023) – 4 episodes
