= Pomona =

Pomona may refer to:

== Places ==
=== Argentina ===
- Pomona, Río Negro

=== Australia ===
- Pomona, Queensland, Australia, a town in the Shire of Noosa
- Pomona, New South Wales, Australia

=== Belize ===
- Pomona, Belize, a municipality in Stann Creek District

=== Mexico ===
- Pomona, Tabasco, a Mayan archeological site

=== Namibia ===
- Pomona, Namibia

=== New Zealand ===
- Pomona Island, New Zealand

=== South Africa ===
- Pomona, Kempton Park

=== United Kingdom ===
- Pomona, an old name for the Mainland of Orkney
- Pomona Docks, in Manchester, England

=== United States ===
- Pomona, California
- Pomona, Illinois
- Pomona, Kansas
- Pomona, Maryland
- Pomona, Michigan
- Pomona, Missouri
- Pomona, New Jersey
- Pomona, New York
- Pomona, Tennessee
- Pomona, Washington
- Pomona Township, Jackson County, Illinois
- Pomona Township, Franklin County, Kansas

==== Academic institutions ====
- California State Polytechnic University, Pomona, a public polytechnic university
- Pomona College, a liberal arts college in Claremont, California

== Other uses ==
- Pomona (fruit survey), a treatise on or a survey of fruit varieties
- Pomona (mythology), the Roman goddess of fruit and nut trees
- Pomona (opera), a German-language opera by Reinhard Keiser
- Pomona (stage play), by Alistair McDowall
- Pomona station (disambiguation), train stations and tram stops
- Pomona, a ballet with music by Constant Lambert
- "Pomona", a waltz by Emile Waldteufel
- Professor Pomona Sprout, a character from the Harry Potter series by J.K. Rowling
- 32 Pomona, an asteroid
- The Herefordshire Pomona, a 19th-century fruit catalogue
- Pomona Electronics
- HMS Pomona (1778), a 28-gun British naval frigate
- Pomona (sternwheeler), an American river steamboat launched in 1898
- Pomona (1181 tons), an American-owned emigrant ship that sank in 1859 with the loss of 389 lives

== See also ==
- Pamona language
- Pomone (disambiguation)
