= Woman's World (disambiguation) =

Woman's World is an American supermarket weekly magazine.

Woman's World, or variants, may also refer to:

== Books and magazines ==
- Woman's World (novel), a 2005 novel by Graham Rawle
- The Woman's World, a London magazine published 1887–1890 and edited by Oscar Wilde
- Women's World (Iranian magazine), published 1922–1923
- Women's World (Ottoman magazine), published 1913–1921
- Women's World (Serbian magazine), published 1886–1914

== Film and television ==
- Woman's World (1954 film), American film
- Woman's World (1967 film), Soviet film
- Woman's World (TV program), a cooking show on WKRG-TV
- Women's World (TV series), also known as Woman's World, an Australian television series

== Music ==
- "Woman's World" (Cher song), a 2013 single by Cher
- "Woman's World" (Katy Perry song), a 2024 single by Katy Perry
- "Woman's World", a 1980 pop single by The Jags
- "Woman's World", a 1981 song by Squeeze on East Side Story
- "Woman's World", a 2010 single by Selah, featuring Mz. Bratt and Sadie Ama
- "Woman's World", a 2018 song on the deluxe edition of LM5 by Little Mix
- "Woman's World (Gurlz Stand Up)", a song by Shystie on Diamond in the Dirt

== Retail businesses ==
- Woman's World, a chain of Minnesota clothing stores owned by Gamble-Skogmo

== See also ==
- Ladies' Edition, Woman's World, a 1997 album by the American R&B band H-Town
