= Ladentown, New York =

Coordinates: 41°11′09″N 74°04′03″W

Ladentown is a hamlet in the Town of Haverstraw, Rockland County, New York, United States, is located in the center of a triangle between Haverstraw, Pomona and Suffern and two miles west of Mount Ivy. It is located north-northwest of New York City.

== History ==
Ladentown was named after Michel Leyden, who was a nail cutter in the Ramapo works who sometimes spelt his name as Laden. He opened a trading store here which became one of the first industries in the county. The mountain people brought baskets, beer barrel hoops, bowls, chairs, ladles and spoons they made from the wood and reeds found in the mountain to Laden's store to sell or take to New York City to be sold.

In 1836, Mr. Leyden sold his store to John J. Secor, but he still took his woodenware to New York City to sell.

The area, prior to its naming, was settled by Quaker families.

== Landmarks and places of interest ==
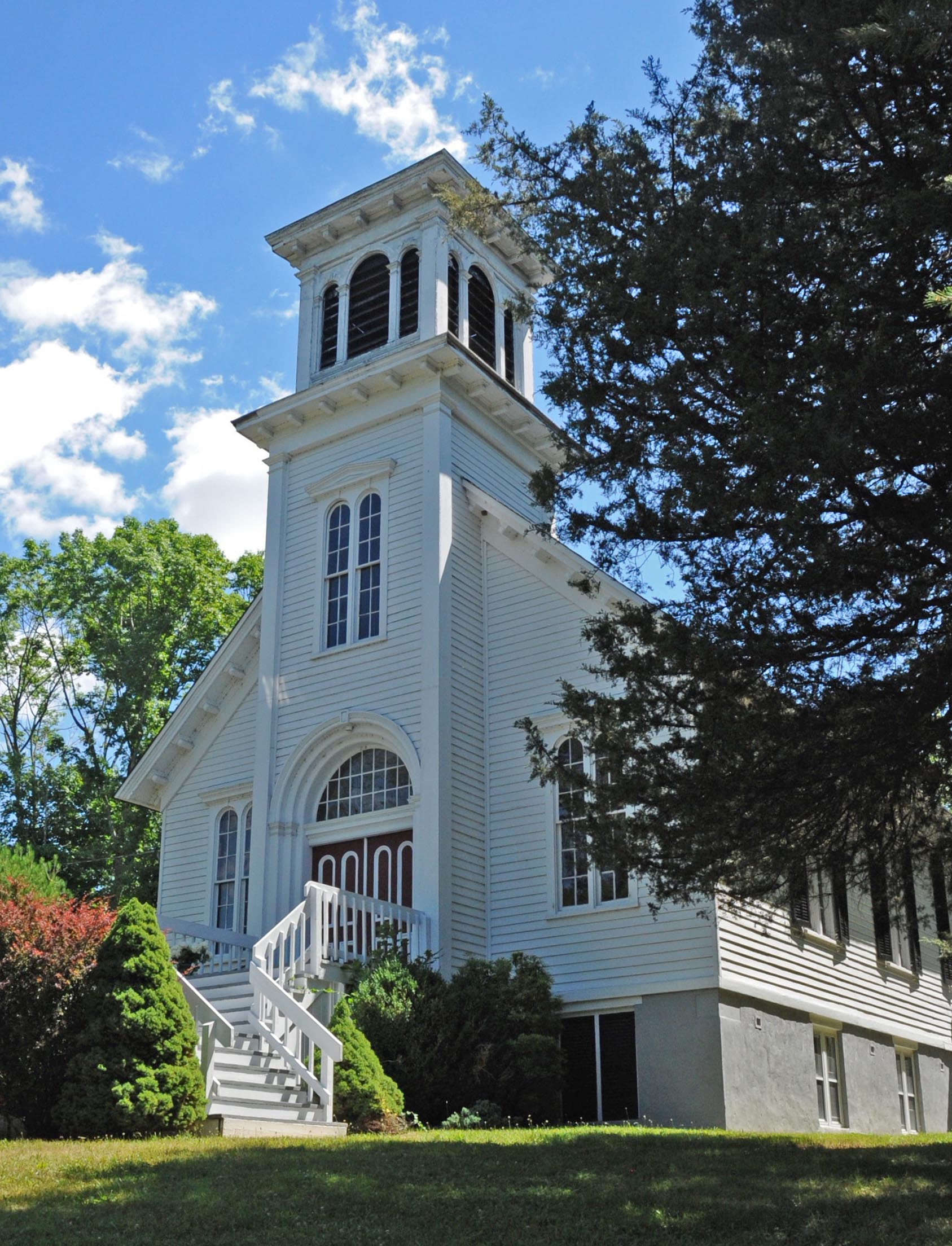
Ladentown United Methodist Church

Ladentown United Methodist Church Historic Church 1865 (NRHP)

== Books and publications ==
- Zimmermann, Linda, Rockland County: Century of History, Historical Society of Rockland County, May 2002, ISBN 978-0-911183-48-1
