= Diamond in the Dirt =

Diamond in the Dirt may refer to:

- Diamond in the Dirt (album), a 2004 album by MC Shystie
- Diamond in the Dirt (EP), an EP by Mist
