= Bruntwood Prize for Playwriting =

British playwriting competition

The Bruntwood Prize for Playwriting is a British competition for playwriting, the largest of its kind in Europe — in 2019 it received 2561 entries. Since its inception in 2005, more than 15,000 scripts have been entered, £304,000 has been awarded to 34 prize-winning writers, and 24 winning productions have been staged in 38 UK-wide venues. In 2015, the prize celebrated its 10th anniversary and is now recognised as a launch-pad for some of the country's most respected and produced playwrights. The Prize is awarded to scripts that are original and unperformed. The award is a joint venture between the property company Bruntwood and the Royal Exchange Theatre in Manchester the Prize is an opportunity for writers of any background and experience to enter unperformed plays to be judged by a panel of industry experts for a chance to win part of a prize fund totalling £40,000.

Each winner enters into a development process with the Royal Exchange Theatre in an endeavour to bring their work to production. There have been co-productions with Lyric Hammersmith, Live Theatre, Soho Theatre, Bush Theatre, Orange Tree Theatre, Sherman Theatre, High Tide and the Royal Court Theatre. Work has also gone on to be produced internationally from Australia, USA, Germany, France, to Canada and Sweden. In addition to a high proportion of winning and shortlisted plays being produced professionally, each of the top 100 plays receives individual feedback from the Royal Exchange Theatre's creative team.

Its alumni include some the UK's most respected playwrights such as Duncan Macmillan and Alistair McDowall.

The Bruntwood Prize is biennial.

== Process ==
All plays are submitted anonymously to the competition and are read by an expert panel of readers appointed by the Royal Exchange Theatre. There is an extensive five-stage process to the reading before creating the shortlist. The final panel of readers, including key artistic staff from the Royal Exchange Theatre, compile a shortlist of 15 plays for the judges to consider. The judges receive the shortlist of scripts and appoint winners. The judging panel has no knowledge about the writers of each script and the writers are only revealed when the judging process is complete.

The submitted scripts therefore go through a rigorous process to make it to the longlist and shortlist;

- Phase One – reading the first 30 pages to identify approximately 900 scripts of potential interest.
- Phase Two – a new set of readers reading the full script to identify the Top 250
- Phase Three – a new set of readers reading the full script to identify the Top 40 for discussion in Phase Four and the longlist of Top 100 scripts eligible for feedback within 2019.
- Phase Four – script meeting to discuss the top 40 scripts and to decide on the shortlist of scripts to be issued to the judges. This meeting is with core artistic staff at the Royal Exchange Theatre and external freelance directors.

The cohort of readers consists of theatre professionals, skilled in reading scripts. They include directors, designers, dramaturges and literary managers at leading producing theatres, actors, national critics and theatre commentators and previous Bruntwood Prize winners (the only playwrights to read, as they are no longer eligible to enter the Prize).

The cohort of readers have a broad range of experiences and specialisms to try and give each submitted script the best chance. The Royal Exchange manages the reading process to ensure that each script is seen by readers with different ages, genders, work history, ethnicities and interests. The aim of the Prize is to recognise plays of high merit regardless of their form and style, so the entry criteria are deliberately broad to allow first time writers and more experienced playwrights to be assessed equally.

Of the 2019 readers, who chose to provided information;

- 15% consider themselves disabled
- 41% are BAME
- 65% are female and 3% are non-binary
- 28% are LGBTA+
- They are aged from their early 20s to over 70 years old

== Award categories ==
Since inception in 2015, multiple Awards have been given, including the overall Bruntwood Prize for Playwriting and the Judges Awards. As of 2019, the categories are:

- The Bruntwood Prize for Playwriting – a first prize of £16,000
- A Judges' Awards of £8,000
- An Original New Voice Award of £8,000- available to playwrights who have not had full-length play professionally produced for 12 performances or more in a professional venue. All scripts entered by these playwrights are also eligible for the Bruntwood Prize, and Judges Award.
- An International Award of £8,000- open to international playwrights invited to anonymously apply via named international partners: The BANFF Centre in Canada; Belvoir Theatre and Melbourne Theatre Company in Australia; Berkeley Rep and Playwrights Horizons in the USA.

As of 2017, the judges can also choose to award Commendations of £4,000 and a funded reading at a London Theatre venue.

== Judges ==
The shortlisted scripts are judged by a prestigious panel of figures from across the arts industry. Until his death in 2019, Michael Oglesby CBE DL, founder of the Bruntwood Group and chairman of The Oglesby Charitable Trust participated in every Judging panel. Acting Artistic Directors of the Royal Exchange Theatre also participate in every panel.

=== 2019 ===
Alongside Joint Artistic Director of the Royal Exchange Theatre Bryony Shanahan, judges include: Kwame Kwei-Armah (chair), Anna Jordan, Bruntwood Prize-winning playwright; Bridget Minamore, journalist, poet and critic; Jenny Sealey MBE, artistic director, Graeae Theatre Company; Kate Vokes, Director of Social Impact, Bruntwood and actor Shane Zaza.

New to the panel this year is "The People's Judge", Faith Yianni, a member of the public selected following a search by the Prize and leading theatre critic Lyn Gardner, to bring an audience member's perspective to the judging process.

=== 2017 ===
Chaired by broadcaster Kirsty Lang, the 2017 judges were: Associated Artistic Director of the Royal Exchange Theatre, Matthew Xia; playwright and former Bruntwood winner Phil Porter; screenwriter and producer Russell T Davies; playwright Lucy Prebble; director Lyndsey Turner; and actor Alfred Enoch.

=== 2016 ===
Chaired by Nicholas Hytner, former artistic director, National Theatre; the 2015 Prize judges were: Artistic Director of the Royal Exchange Theatre, Sarah Frankcom; playwright and former Bruntwood winner, Vivienne Franzmann; artistic director, Actors Touring Company, Ramin Gray; playwright Bryony Lavery; writer and broadcaster, Miranda Sawyer; and actor and writer, Meera Syal CBE.

=== 2013 ===
Chaired by Broadcaster Dame Jenni Murray the 2013 Prize judges were: award-winning playwrights David Eldridge and Tanika Gupta MBE; associate director of the National Theatre, Marianne Elliott; actress Suranne Jones; artistic director of the Royal Exchange Theatre Greg Hersov; and theatre critic Benedict Nightingale.

=== 2011 ===
The judging panel was chaired by playwright Simon Stephens and included, Royal Exchange Artistic Director Sarah Frankcom, writer Jackie Kay, and actors Sue Johnston and Maxine Peake.

=== 2008 ===
The judging panel was chaired by actor and director Richard Wilson and included actress Brenda Blethyn OBE, actor Michael Sheen, film director Roger Michell, playwright Roy Williams, and Royal Exchange Artistic Director Greg Hersov.

=== 2005 ===
Judges were chaired by Chris Smith MP and consisted of actress Brenda Blythyn OBE; Director of the National Theatre Nicholas Hynter; actor, playwright and singer Kwame Kwei Armah; and The Founding Artistic Director of the Royal Exchange Theatre Company Braham Murray.

== Winners and nominees ==
=== pre-2005 ===
A pilot version of the prize, running in the North West area of the UK only, was won by playwright Nicola Schofield in 2003.

=== 2005 ===
- Monster by Duncan Macmillan (Winner)
- The Cracks in My Skin by Phil Porter (Judges' Award)
- Pretend You Have Big Buildings by Ben Musgrave (Judges' Award)

=== 2008 ===
- Mogadishu by Vivienne Franzmann (Joint Winner)
- Winterlong by Andrew Sheridan (Joint Winner)
- The Butcher Boys by Naylah Ahmed (Joint Winner)
- Salt by Fiona Peek (Joint Winner)

=== 2011 ===
- Three Birds by Janice Okoh (Winner)
- Brilliant Adventures by Alistair McDowall (Judges' Award)
- Britannia Waves The Rules by Gareth Farr (Judges' Award)
- Shadow Play by Louise Monaghan (Judges' Award)
- A Map of the Region by Tim Luscombe
- Climbing Snakes by Curtis Cole
- I and the Village by Silva Semerciyan
- I Started a Fire by Miriam Battye
- One Look by Cornell S John
- White by Kenneth Emson

=== 2013 ===
- Yen by Anna Jordan (Winner)
- So Here We Are by Luke Norris (Judges' Prize)
- The Rolling Stone by Chris Urch (Judges' Prize)
- Bird by Katherine Chandler (Judges' Prize)
- December by Alice Birch
- Dorm by Lynda Radley
- Imam (Faith) by Toby Clarke
- P’YongYang by Insook Chappell
- Russian Dolls by Kate Lock
- Waste by David Kantounas

=== 2015 ===
- Wish List by Katherine Soper (Winner)
- The Almighty Sometimes by Kendall Feaver (Judges' Award)
- Sound of Silence by Chloe Todd Fordham (Judges' Award)
- Parliament Square by James Fritz (Judges' Award)
- How My Light Is Spent by Alan Harris (Judges' Award)
- Rails by Simon Longman
- Tabs by Ellie Kendrick
- Wild is De Wind by Chino Odimba
- Madra by Frances Poet
- Jonestown by Kellie Smith

=== 2017 ===
- Heartworm by Timothy X Atack (Winner)
- King Brown by Laurie Nunn (Judges' Award)
- Plow by Sharon Clark (Judges' Award)
- Electric Rosary by Tim Foley (Judges' Award)
- Oh Graveyard, You Can’t Hold Me Always by Alan McKendrick
- A Place For We by Archie Maddocks
- Pumpjack by Daniel Foxsmith
- This Is Not America by Joshua Val Martin (Commended)
- when after all it was you and me by Kevin Doyle
- A Bit Of Light by Rebecca Callard (Commended)

=== 2019 ===
- Shed: Exploded View by Phoebe Eclair-Powell (Winner)
- Akedah by Michael John O’Neill (Original New Voice Award)
- Glee & Me by Stuart Slade (Judges Award)
- Ballybaile by Jody O’Neill
- black bird by babirye bukilwa
- Neptune by Sam Grabiner
- The European Hare by Sami Ibrahim
- Glass by Jacob Kay
- Salty Irina by Eve Leigh
- Hares by Lee Mattison

==== International Shortlist ====
- untitled f*ck m*ss s**gon play by Kimber Lee (The Bruntwood Prize International Award)
- Tambo & Bone by Dave Harris (Commendation)
- Pavlov’s Dogs by Emme Hoy
- This Land Was Made by Tori Sampson
- Periods of Collapse OR Mother Russia by Lauren Yee

=== 2022 ===
- TIME, LIKE THE SEA by Georgia Bruce
- The Institute by David Dawson
- The China Play by Jeremy Green
- Leave the morning to the morning by Paddy Hughes (Original New Voice Award)
- Bindweed by Martha Loader (Judges Award)
- Allah in the walls by Jasmin Mandi-Ghomi
- THREE by Jill O’Halloran
- BULLRING TECHNO MAKEOUT JAMZ by Nathan Queeley-Dennis (Winner)
- (THE)Woman by Jane Upton

=== 2025 ===
- The Annunciation by T. Adamson
- Dream Body by Natasha Collie
- rite to party by Yasmine Dankwah
- DOG DOG DOG by Terri Jade Donovan
- Talking to Boys by Abbi Greenland
- Corpselight by Daniel Grimston
- The Plan by Mary Elizabeth Hamilton
- Coziness by Julia Jarcho
- R Lady’s by Daisy Miles (Original New Voice Award)
- TRIM PALACE by Courttia Newland
- SHOOTERS by Tolu Okanlawon (Winner)
- Przewalski’s Horses by Silva Semerciyan
- SPREAD by Jesús I. Valles
- Voyagers by Ava Wong Davies
- golf girl by Seayoung Yim

== Online resources ==
To support writers to create scripts for the stage, the Bruntwood Prize provides free to access resources on their website. These include; promoting opportunities and events for playwrights around the UK and Republic of Ireland, blogs and long-form articles from playwrights and stage writing tutorials. In 2015 they launched regular series of Livestream workshops hosted by leading playwrights. In 2019 the an online 'Toolkit' was launched to take a writer through writing their first play.
