= Tendayi Jembere =

British actor

Tendayi Jembere is a British actor of Zimbabwean origin who is best known for his part in the 2003 television show Kerching!, where he played the character of Seymour, the best friend of lead character Taj Lewis.

== Biography ==
He grew up in East London.

Tendayi Jembere's first television part was in the CBBC sitcom Kerching! where he played the main character's best friend, Seymour, a cooking expert and the junior partner of the successful company RudeBoy. He owned 1% of Rudeboy's takings which were in the thousands by that period of time in the show's history. Kerching has so far run for more than four series and has been repeated on the CBBC Channel.

== Career ==
=== Kerching! ===
Fourteen-year-old Taj Lewis is hoping to make his family a million pounds, and to this end has launched a website under the name 'rude boy'. His family and pals are Seymour and Danny, his best friends; Missy, his big sister; Kareesha, her best friend; Ricardo, Taj's rival; and Tasmin, Ricardo's girlfriend. Completing the main line-up are Taj's little brother Omar and their single mum, who works as a nurse.

=== Other roles ===
- Mr Harvey Lights a Candle (2005), a TV series where Jembere played the character of Sid Williams.
- 2007 - Michael Baxter in The Bill.
- 2007 - Jembere was in Dubplate Drama, where the viewers decide what happens next through voting online or text via mobile phone. He played a character called "Minus".
- 2008 - appeared in Angel House by Roy Williams, West Yorkshire Playhouse and touring.
- 2011 - Jembere appeared as Chuggs in Mogadishu by Vivienne Franzmann at the Royal Exchange in Manchester then at the Lyric Theatre in London.
- 2012 - appeared in The Kitchen by Arnold Wesker, National Theatre Live.
- 2013 - Romeo in a children's production of Romeo and Juliet at the National Theatre.
- 2014 - appeared in The Saints, Nuffield Theatre, Southampton.
- 2016 - appeared in Peter and the Starcatcher at the Royal & Derngate.
