= Chris Urch =

English playwright

- Born: 1986 or 1987 (age 39–40); Midsomer Norton, Somerset
- Education: Drama Centre London
- Occupation: Playwright
- Writing career
- Subject: LGBTQ rights
- Notable awards: Bruntwood Prize for Playwriting (2013); Offie for "Best New Play" (2017); Iris Prize for Best British Short Film (2025)

Chris Urch is an English playwright whose works are known for exploring themes of social justice and LGBTQ rights. His works have been staged in the West End, in touring productions across the UK, as well as internationally in Australia and the US.

== Early life ==
Urch grew up in Midsomer Norton in Somerset. In his childhood, he participated in his local theatre group, Merriman Theatre Company. He went on to train at the Drama Centre as an actor, before turning to writing plays.

== Career ==
=== Stage works ===
Urch had had no formal training in playwriting before pursuing this path. However, he has credited his training as an actor for helping him write characters and dialogues. His career in playwriting was kickstarted at Theatre503, where he was selected for the 503Five residency scheme for young writers. His debut play, Vote of No Confidence, was later staged at the same theatre in 2013 as part of its LabFest, produced by Without a Paddle Theatre Company. The production was selected by Howard Brenton as part of The Playwright Presents scheme - where an established author helps launch the career of an emerging playwright. Praising Urch, Brenton has compared the young playwright to Tennessee Williams.

==== Land of Our Fathers ====
Urch’s first full-length play Land of Our Fathers, set in a Welsh coalmine on the eve of the 1979 general election, received wide critical acclaim when it opened at Theatre503 in 2013. The play then transferred to Trafalgar Theatre in the West End in 2014, followed by a Wales tour in 2015, and an England tour in 2016.

==== The Rolling Stone ====
Urch's next major play, The Rolling Stone, deals with the topic of violent homophobia in Uganda. It received its premiere at the Royal Exchange Theatre in Manchester in 2015, followed by performances at the West Yorkshire Playhouse in Leeds (2015) and the Orange Tree Theatre in London (2016). The play won a Judges' award at the Bruntwood Prize for Playwriting in 2013, the 2016 Manchester Theatre Award for Best New Play, and the 2017 Offie for Best New Play.

Internationally, The Rolling Stone was staged in Sydney at the Seymour Centre in 2018 and in New York at the off-broadway Mitzi E. Newhouse Theater in 2019.

=== Screenwriting and directing ===
In 2016, Urch was announced as the writer of an untitled biopic about Alexander McQueen, with Andrew Haigh also attached to the project as director. To date, the film has yet to be released.

In 2023, Chris Urch was awarded a grant from the British Film Institute's Short Film Fund for a short film entitled Blackout, which he would also direct in addition to writing. The film, which explores the theme of domestic violence, starred Mawaan Rizwan and was released in 2024. Blackout won the 2025 Iris Prize in the Best British Short Film category, winning Urch £40,000 to create a new LGBTQ-themed film.

== Personal life ==
Urch is openly gay.

== Filmography ==
Key
| † | Denotes films that have not yet been released |

=== Films ===
| Year | Title | Director | Writer | Notes | Refs |
|---|---|---|---|---|---|
| 2024 | Blackout | Yes | Yes | Short film | |
| Unreleased | Untitled Alexander McQueen biopic † | No | Yes | | |

=== Stage ===
| Year premiered | Title | Notable productions | Notes |
|---|---|---|---|
| 2013 | Vote of No Confidence | 2013 - Theatre503 (Part of LabFest) | Championed by Howard Brenton as part of The Playwright Presents scheme. |
| 2013 | Land of Our Fathers | 2013 - Theatre503; 2014 - Trafalgar Theatre; 2015 - Wales tour 2016 - England tour | Co-produced by Wales Millennium Centre. |
| 2015 | The Rolling Stone | 2015 - Royal Exchange, Manchester (premier), West Yorkshire Playhouse; 2016 - Orange Tree Theatre, London; 2018 - Seymour Centre, Sydney; 2019 - Mitzi E. Newhouse Theater, New York | |

== Awards and nominations ==
| Year | Award | Category | Nominated work | Result | Notes |
|---|---|---|---|---|---|
| 2013 | Bruntwood Prize for Playwriting | | The Rolling Stone | Judges' Award | Prize value: £8,000 |
| 2016 | Manchester Theatre Awards | Best New Play | The Rolling Stone | Won | |
| 2017 | Offie | Best New Play | The Rolling Stone | Won | |
| 2017 | Offie | Best Production | The Rolling Stone production at Orange Tree Theatre (2016) | Won | |
