= Mogadishu (play) =

2011 play by Vivienne Franzmann

- Cover of the play text, featuring original cast members Savannah Gordon-Liburd (left) and Malachi Kirby (right)
- Written by: Vivienne Franzmann
- Characters: 8 male, 4 female
- Original language: English
- Setting: A comprehensive secondary school in London

Premiere
- Date premiered: 2011
- Place premiered: Royal Exchange, Manchester
- Directed by: Matthew Dunster
- Original run: 26 January – 19 February 2011

Mogadishu is the debut play by ex-school teacher Vivienne Franzmann concerning a white teacher who tries to protect her Black student from expulsion after he pushes her to the ground. In order to protect himself, the student lies and drags her into a vortex of lies in which victim becomes perpetrator. The play was first produced by Royal Exchange Theatre in Manchester before it was transferred to the Lyric Theatre in Hammersmith, London. It was one of four joint winners of the Bruntwood Playwriting Competition in 2008 and the George Devine Award for most promising playwright in 2010.

== Plot summary ==
In a tough London secondary school, a teacher named Amanda is pushed to the ground by a black student named Jason when she tries to intervene in a fight between Jason and a younger foreign student named Firat. Ignoring the advice of her daughter, Becky, to report the incident, Amanda resists telling the headmaster, Chris, for fear of ruining Jason's future. Knowing Jason's history, one which she refuses to reveal to Becky, Amanda feels sorry for Jason. Finally persuaded, the next day she mentions the incident to Chris who is suspicious of why she has waited so long.

In the meantime, Jason has enlisted his on-and-off girlfriend Dee and his friends Chug, Saif, Jordan and Chloe to back up his story that Amanda pushed him first and racially abused him. They are hesitant at first but soon change their minds; Chris is forced to take the claims seriously and sends Amanda home. Becky is enraged at their lies and turns to her black stepfather, Peter, to tell Amanda to take the situation seriously and contact her union. Refusing to blow the situation out of proportion, Amanda does nothing and is soon suspended when the kids stick to their stories. Even Firat claims that he didn't see what happened.

Amanda feels betrayed by Chris and above all by Jason. Chris calls Jason and his father into school. Jason's father turns out to be quite an intimidating figure; after getting Jason's assurance that he is telling the truth, he demands to know why Chris has not yet reported the incident to the police. Chris agrees to do so. Jason asks his friends to go to the police to volunteer a statement against Amanda and they eventually agree to do so. While waiting late at night for a phone call to tell him what happened at the police station, Jason is interrupted by his father. His father is furious over breaking the house rules regarding late night phone calls. His father answers a call from Dee and tells her that Jason wets the bed.

Under severe pressure from Becky, Amanda admits that she feels sorry for Jason because his mother killed herself. Becky begs Firat to tell Chris that he saw Amanda get pushed; he agrees and tells the friends this. Jason is furious and he suspects that they did not really go to the police. After a fight where he slaps Dee, they desert him. Becky confronts Jason alone in the playground and reveals that her own father killed himself, hanging himself with a Homer Simpson tie she had given him for Christmas. Jason is cold toward this revelation, even when she reveals scars across her legs and arms from self-harm. They argue furiously and Becky taunts him over his dead mother.

The friends, led by Dee, admit to having lied to Chris, who can then drop the charges. Jason is seen in his house making a noose for himself in the kitchen and hanging himself. Amanda returns to school but, betrayed by the system she put so much faith in, she refuses to accept Dee's apology and tells Chris that she does not want to return to school anymore.

== Productions ==
The play premiered at the Royal Exchange in Manchester on 26 January 2011 and ran until 19 February 2011. It transferred to the Lyric Theatre in Hammersmith, London for a four-week run from 7 March to 2 April. In 2012, the show was toured across regional theatres in the UK, including at the following venues:

- Liverpool Playhouse: 30 January – 4 February
- Cambridge Arts Theatre: 7 – 11 February
- Oxford Playhouse: 14 – 18 February
- Warwick Arts Centre: 21 – 25 February
- Royal & Derngate, Northampton: 28 February – 3 March
- Nuffield Theatre, Southampton: 13–15 March
- Northern Stage, Newcastle: 20 – 24 March
- Lyric Theatre, Hammersmith: 27 – 31 March

In 2014, a staged reading of Mogadishu was produced at Josephine Louis Theatre of Northwestern University (in the United States) as part of the celebration of Martin Luther King Day (20 January).

== Notable casts ==
Character	Original cast	UK tour
Character	2011	2012
Amanda	Julia Ford	Jackie Clune
Jason	Malachi Kirby	Ryan Calais Cameron
Chris	Ian Bartholomew	James Barriscale
Peter	Christian Dixon	Jason Barnett
Ben	Frazer James	Nicholas Beveney
Becky	Shannon Tarbet	Rosie Wyatt
Saif	Farshid Rokey	Farshid Rokey
Chuggs	Tendayi Jembere	Tendayi Jembere
Jordon	Hammed Animashaun	Hammed Animashaun
Dee	Savannah Gordon-Liburd	Savannah Gordon-Liburd
Firat	Michael Karim	Michael Karim
Chloe	Tara Hodge	Tara Hodge

== Critical reception ==
The original Manchester production of the play received generally favourable reviews, with Dominic Cavendish of The Telegraph, in a five-star review, proclaiming, "The play of the year? In my book, quite possibly". On the other hand, WhatsOnStage gave Mogadishu three stars, citing the over the top and rushed nature of the ending, "thus removing any ounce of poignancy".

The play was included in the GCSE Drama curriculum at Teddington School in 2013, leading to outrage from some parents who criticised the play's vulgar language, its dark themes of racism and violence, as well as the depiction of self-harm and suicide. However, there were also parents who supported the inclusion of Mogadishu in the curriculum. Defending teaching of the text at school, Mark Lawson from The Guardian argued, "a play, such as Mogadishu, that contains taboo language, racism and homophobia, can be seen as a good opportunity to discuss with a group of students their own attitudes and methods of expression".

== Awards and nominations ==
Year	Award	Category	Nominee(s)	Result	Note
2008	Bruntwood Prize for Playwriting		Vivienne Franzmann	Won	One of four joint-winners.
2010	George Devine Award		Vivienne Franzmann	Won	
2011	Evening Standard Theatre Awards	Milton Shulman Award for Outstanding Newcomer	Malachi Kirby	Shortlisted	
2011	Evening Standard Theatre Awards	Charles Wintour Award For Most Promising Playwright	Vivienne Franzmann	Shortlisted	
2011	Manchester Theatre Awards	Best Actress in a Supporting Role	Shannon Tarbet	Won	Awarded in 2012.
2011	Manchester Theatre Awards	Best New Play	Vivienne Franzmann	Nominated	Awarded in 2012.
2012	WhatsOnStage Awards	Best New Play	Vivienne Franzmann	Nominated	
2012	Laurence Olivier Awards	Outstanding Achievement in Affiliate Theatre	Royal Exchange, Manchester and Lyric Theatre, Hammersmith	Nominated	
