= Pomona (mythology) =

Nymph and goddess of fruitful abundance

- Goddess of fruit trees, fruitful abundance, plenty, gardens, and orchards
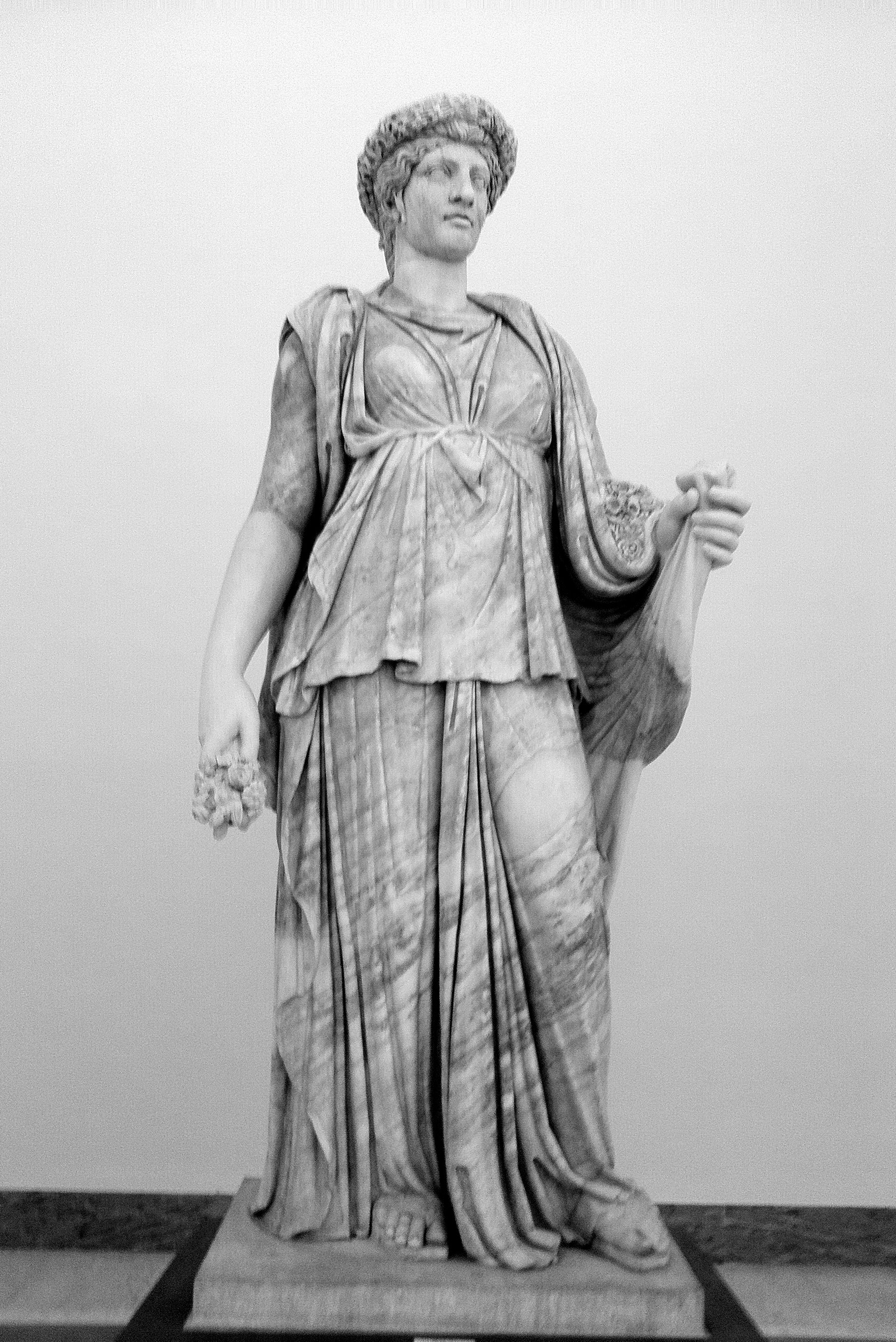
- Statue of Pomona, Naples Archaeology Museum (late 2nd century AD)
- Major cult center: Pomonal
- Abode: gardens and orchards
- Symbols: pruning knife
- Festivals: Vertumnalia
- Consort: Vertumnus

Pomona (/pəˈmoʊnə/, Latin: [poːˈmoːna]) was a goddess of fruitful abundance and plenty in ancient Roman religion and myth. Her name comes from the Latin word pomum, "fruit", specifically orchard fruit.

Pomona was said to be a wood nymph. Pomona does not have a clear counterpart in Greek mythology, although the fruit goddess Opora can be seen as her equivalent.

== Etymology ==
The name Pōmōna is a derivation from Latin pōmus ('fruit-tree, fruit'), possibly stemming from Proto-Italic *po-e/omo ('taken off, picked?'), cognate with Umbrian Puemune, ultimately from Proto-Indo-European *h₁e/omo ('what is (to be) taken').

== Mythology ==
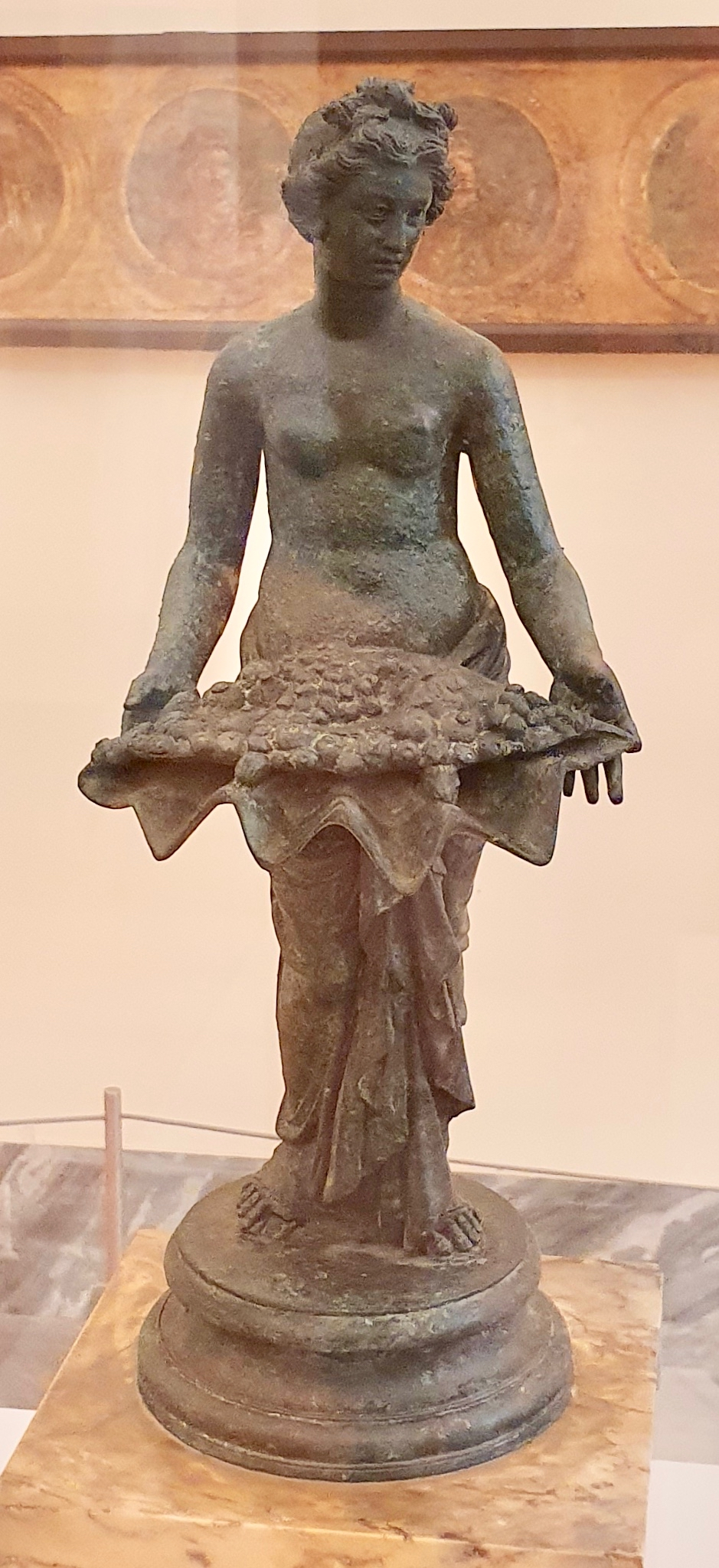
Statuette of Pomona from Pompeii, holding a bivalve shell filled with fruit

In the myth narrated by Ovid, she scorned the love of the woodland gods Silvanus and Picus, but married Vertumnus after he tricked her, disguised as an old woman. She and Vertumnus shared a festival held on August 13. Her priest was called the flamen Pomonalis. The pruning knife was her attribute. There is a grove that is sacred to her called the Pomonal, located not far from Ostia, the ancient port of Rome.

Pomona was the goddess of fruit trees, gardens, and orchards. Unlike many other Roman goddesses and gods, she does not have a Greek counterpart, though she is commonly associated with Demeter. She watches over and protects fruit trees and cares for their cultivation. She was not actually associated with the harvest of fruits itself, but with the flourishing of the fruit trees. In artistic depictions she is generally shown with a platter of fruit or a cornucopia.

== Namesakes ==
The city of Pomona, California, in Los Angeles County, is named after the goddess. Pomona College was founded in the city and retained its name even after relocating to its present-day location in Claremont.

The township of Pomona, Illinois, in Jackson County, is named after the goddess. The township is home to mainly agricultural land, and has wineries and orchards in the vicinity.

The town of Pomona Park, Florida, in Putnam County is named after the goddess of fruit from the time citrus horticulture dominated the economy of the area.

The Pomona Docks (formerly part of the Manchester docks) were built on the site of the Pomona Gardens. A former public house nearby was named the Pomona Palace.

32 Pomona is a main belt asteroid discovered in 1854.

In 2003 a newly discovered honey bee (Apis mellifera) subspecies was named after Pomona being called the Apis mellifera pomonella. It was discovered in the Tien Shan Mountains, an area with the greatest genetic diversity for a wild Malus species, M. sieversii, that is the predominant ancestor of domesticated apple varieties, which are typically pollinated by honey bees on a commercial scale.

Pomona is a rural town and locality in the Shire of Noosa, Queensland, Australia. It is about 135 kilometres north of Brisbane. The town was originally called Pinbarren Siding from 1890-1900 as a subsidiary to Pinbarren. In the 2021 census, the locality of Pomona had a population of 2,931 people. Pomona was renamed in 1900, after the Roman goddess of fruit, following the government rejection of the names Pinbarren and Cooroora. Its name avoided confusion with the neighbouring towns of Cooroy and Cooran and reflected the fertile nature in the area.

== Representations in art ==
A bronze statue of Pomona sits atop the Pulitzer Fountain in Manhattan's Grand Army Plaza in New York. The fountain was funded by newspaper tycoon Joseph Pulitzer, designed by the architect Thomas Hastings, and crowned by a statue conceived by the sculptor Karl Bitter. The fountain was dedicated in May 1916.

Pomona is briefly mentioned in C. S. Lewis's children's book Prince Caspian.

Der Sieg der fruchtbaren Pomona ("The Victory of Fruitful Pomona") is a 1702 opera by Reinhard Keiser.

Pomona is the title of a play by Alistair McDowell, commissioned in 2014 for the Royal Welsh College of Music and Drama.

Pomona is one of three statues featured at the Massachusetts Horticulture Society's Elm Bank Horticulture Center, along with Ceres and Flora.

== Gallery ==
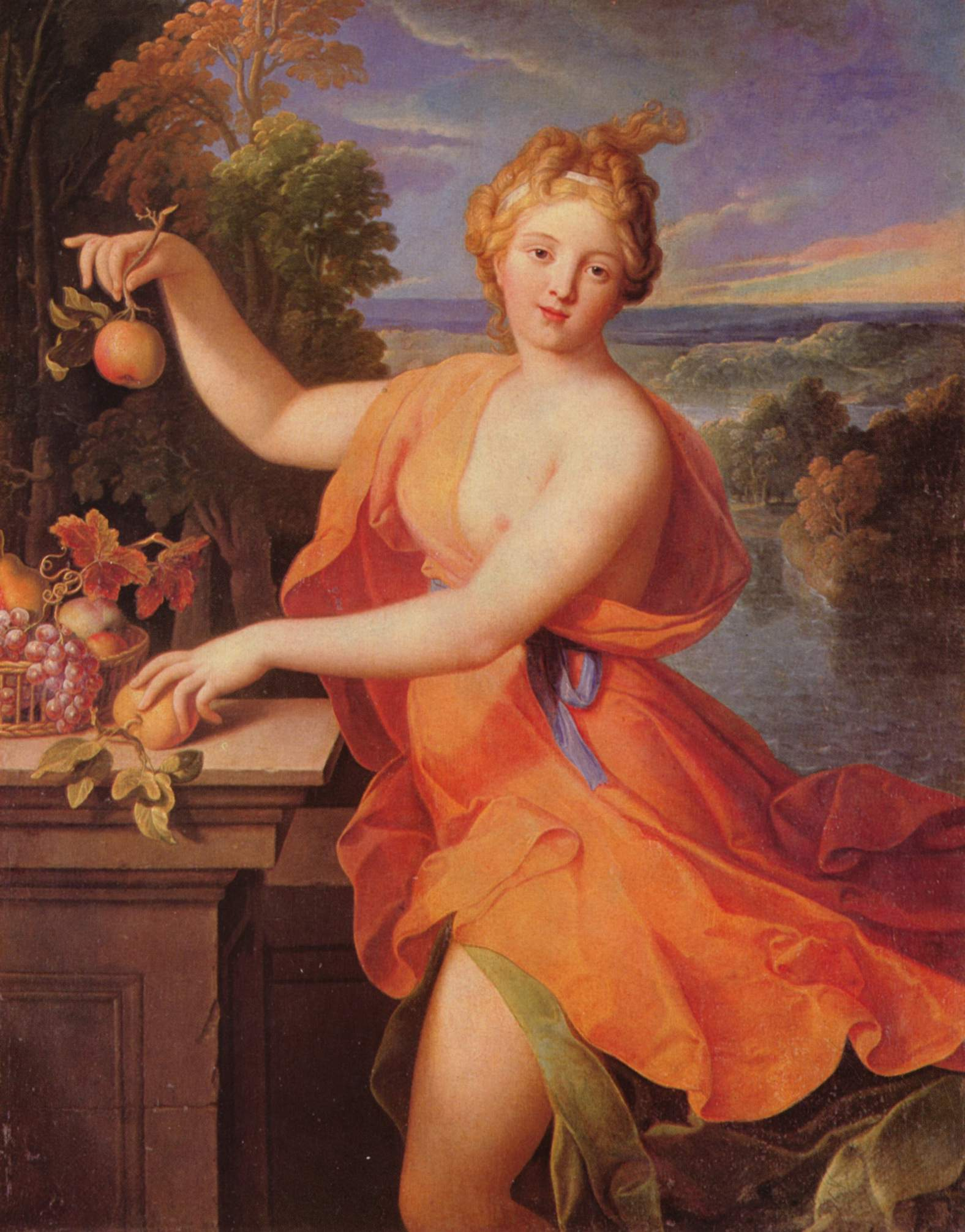
Pomona, by Nicolas Fouché, c. 1700.

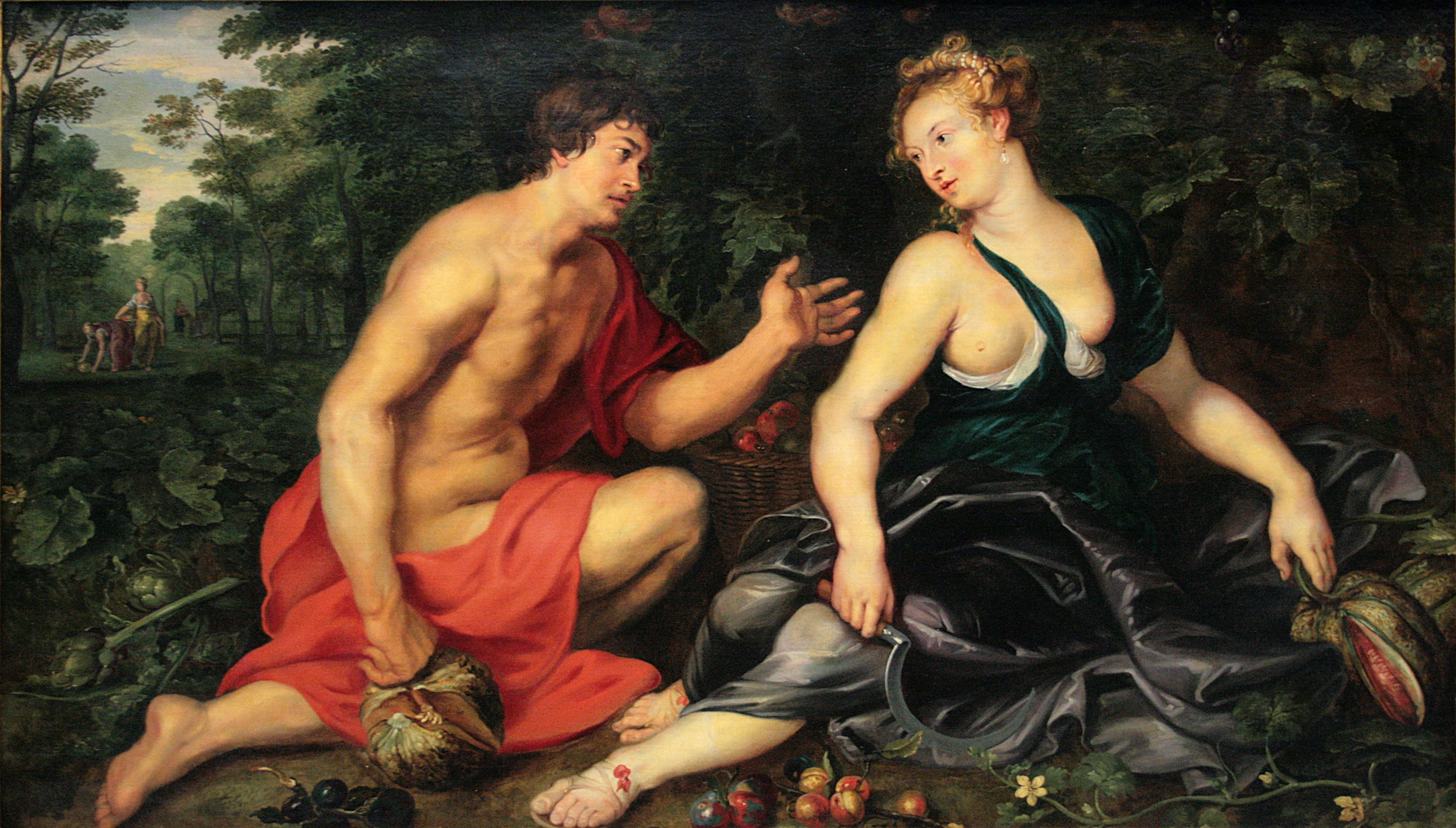
Vertumnus and Pomona by Peter Paul Rubens, 1617–1619, private collection in Madrid.

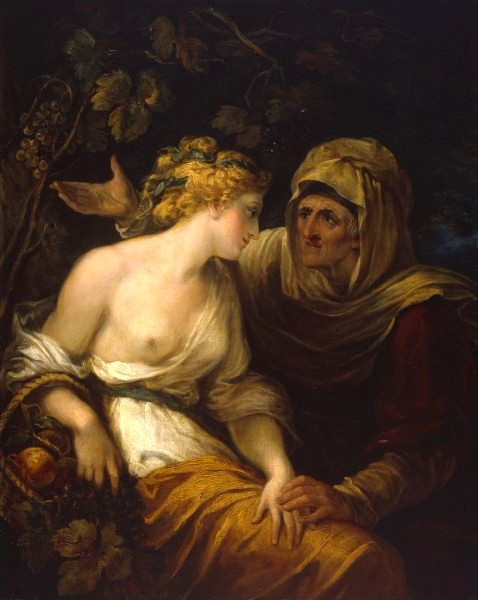
Vertumnus and Pomona by William Hamilton

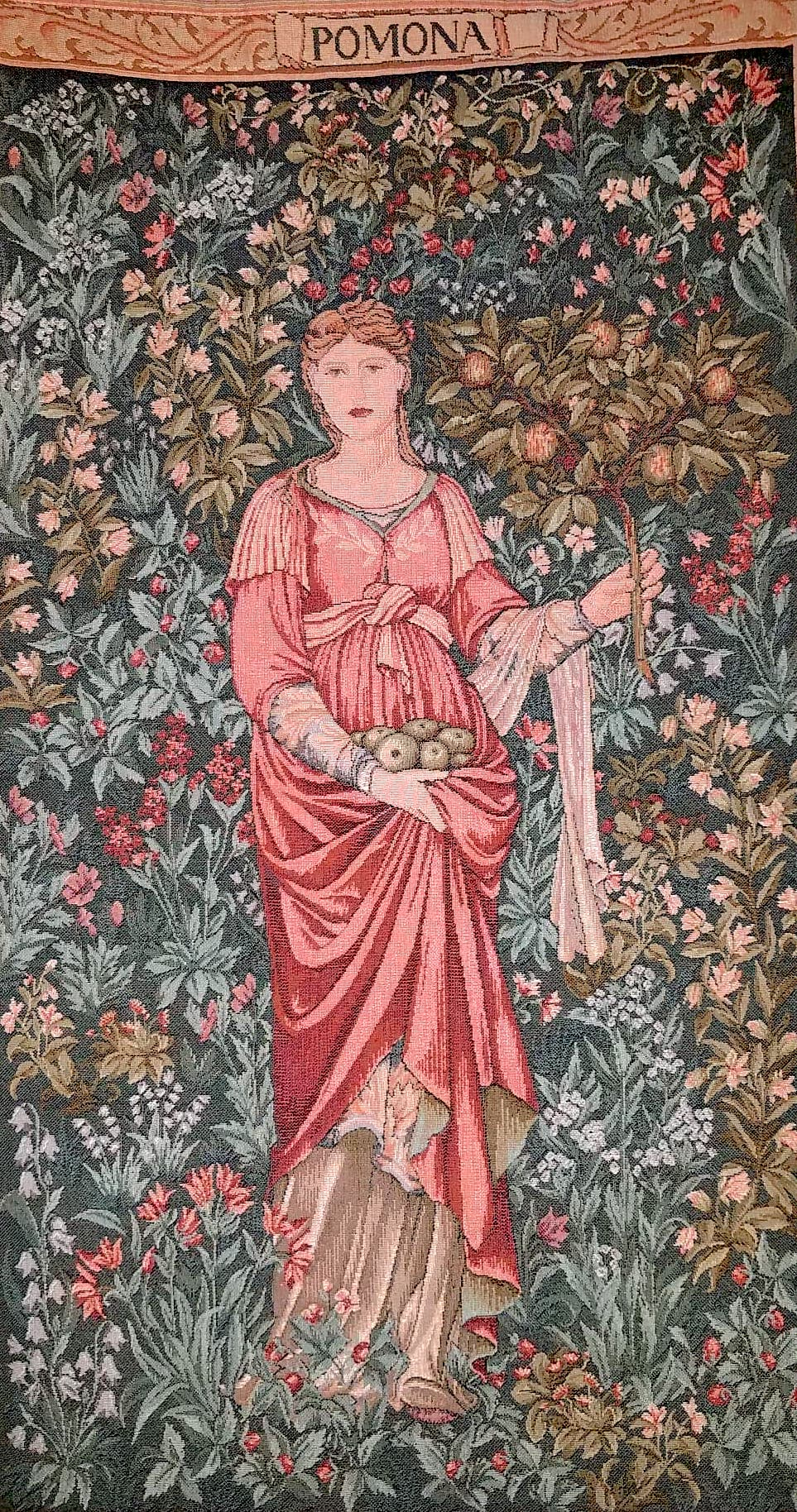
Tapestry depicting the goddess Pomona.

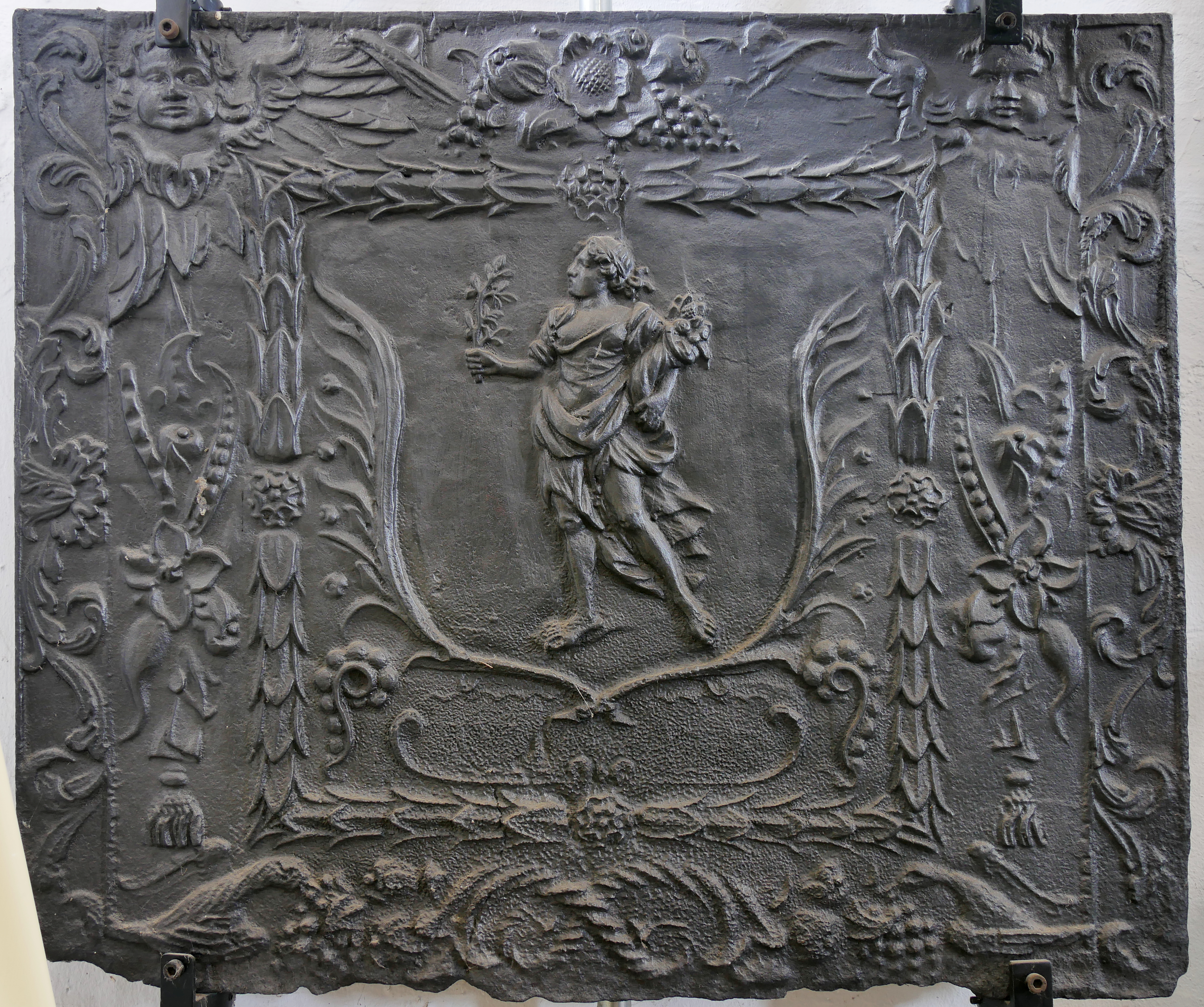
Pomona as allegory of autumn, fireback in the Roscheider Hof Open Air Museum

== See also ==
- Karpo, one of the Horae.
- Leucothoe, who was similarly seduced.
- The ballet Pomona, with music by Constant Lambert, choreography by Frederick Ashton and scenery and costumes by Vanessa Bell, was first performed by the Vic-Wells Ballet at the Sadler's Wells Theatre on 17 January 1933.
