= Graham Rawle =

British writer and collage artist (1955–2024)

Graham Rawle (22 July 1955 – 16 August 2024) was a British writer and collage artist whose visual work incorporates illustration, design, photography and installation. His weekly Lost Consonants series appeared in the Weekend Guardian for 15 years (1990–2005). He produced other regular series which included ‘Lying Doggo’ and ‘Graham Rawle’s Wonder Quiz’ for The Observer and ‘When Words Collide’ and ‘Pardon Mrs Arden’ for The Sunday Telegraph Magazine and 'Bright Ideas' for The Times.

== Life and career ==
Rawle was born in Birmingham on 22 July 1955. He lectured and exhibited his work internationally, heading the design team that created the 4,000 sq ft (370 m^{2}) 'Hi-Life' supermarket installation for EXPO 2000 in Hanover. As director of the Niff Institute, in 2001 he created a range of limited edition art pieces that form the Niff Actuals product range.

Among his astonishing published books are The Wonder Book of Fun, Lying Doggo, Diary of an Amateur Photographer and a reinterpretation of The Wizard of Oz, which won 2009 Book of the Year and best Illustrated Trade book at the British Book Design and Production Awards. His critically acclaimed Woman's World, a novel created entirely from fragments of found text clipped from women's magazines of the 1950s and '60s, is being made into a found footage film collage. The Card was shortlisted for the 2013 Writers' Guild of Great Britain Book Award. His most recent novel Overland, designed to be read horizontally, was published in 2018.

Graham Rawle taught part-time on the MA Sequential Design/Illustration and Arts and Design by Independent Project courses at The Faculty of Arts (University of Brighton). He was a visiting professor in Illustration at Norwich University of the Arts where in 2012 he was awarded an Honorary Doctorate for services to design.

Rawle accepted the role of Visiting Professor of Illustration from Falmouth School of Art at Falmouth University in 2016.

Rawle lived in London. He died from complications related to cancer treatment on 16 August 2024, at the age of 69.

== Bibliography ==
- Lost Consonants, 1991
- More Lost Consonants, 1992
- Wonder Book of Fun, 1993
- Lost Consonants 3, 1993
- Lost Consonants 4, 1995
- Lying Doggo, 1995
- Lost Consonants 5, 1995
- Lost Consonants 6, 1996
- Lost Consonants 7, 1997
- Diary of an Amateur Photographer, 1998
- Return of Lost Consonants, 1999
- Cassell’s Rhyming Slang, (with Jonathan Green) 2000
- Woman’s World, 2005
- The Wizard of Oz, (Illustrated) Original 1900 text by L. Frank Baum, 2008
- The Card, 2012
- Overland, 2018
