= Dubplate Drama =

2005 British drama TV series

- Genre: Drama
- Created by: Luke Hyams
- Starring: Chanel Cali; Tyler "Hoodman" Daly; Roger Griffiths; Daniel Parmar; Michael Coombs; Ricci Harnett; Duane Henry; Tendayi Jembere; Adam Deacon; Tulisa Contostavlos; Dino Contostavlos; Big Narstie; Katia Winter; Charles Mnene; Darragh Mortell; Rodney Panton
- Composers: Arlen Figgis; Justin Stennet
- Country of origin: United Kingdom
- Original language: English
- No. of seasons: 3
- No. of episodes: 20

Production
- Executive producers: Michelle Morgan; Sam Coniff; Justin Stennett
- Producers: Louis Figgis; Red Mullet
- Cinematography: Damian Bromley; Kit Fraser
- Editors: Arlen Figgis; Yusuf Pirhasan
- Running time: 15 minutes (Series 1); 30 minutes (Series 2); 60 minutes (Series 3)
- Production company: Channel 4 Television Corporation

Original release
- Network: Channel 4
- Release: 11 November 2005 – 3 July 2009

Dubplate Drama is a British television drama series, created, written and directed by Luke Hyams, first broadcast on Channel 4 on 11 November 2005. The series follows the plight of teenage grime MC Dionne lead actress played by (Chanel "Shystie" Cali), as she tries to achieve her dream of obtaining a major-label record deal to help provide for her grandmother. The series was described as "the world's first interactive drama series", as it allowed viewers to vote on the outcome of each episode through an interactive text service. Thus, two alternative versions of every episode were filmed, with the version broadcast depending on the outcome of the viewer vote. The series featured appearances from a number of well-known British grime and hip-hop musicians, including Rodney P, Dappy, Tulisa, Fazer, Big Narstie and Tim Westwood.

Aside from being shown on Channel 4, the series also aired on MTV Base and was made available on demand via social networking site MySpace. Despite a late-night timeslot, the first series, comprising six fifteen-minute episodes, earned a peak audience of 480,000 viewers and was critically well received. Across the course of the six-week broadcast, the series gathered a combined audience of 3.3 million viewers. Subsequently, the second series was awarded the fixed timeslot of 12.30am on Thursdays, with episodes being rerun on E4 the following weekend. The second series was also extended to twelve episodes, which ran at an extended length of thirty minutes each. A third and final series, comprising two sixty-minute episodes, broadcast in 2009. The final episode was sponsored by the NSPCC as part of their Childline campaign, to highlight the dangers of knife and gun crime.

== Release ==
The first series was released on DVD via Revolver Entertainment on 29 October 2007. The second series followed on 4 February 2008. The third series currently remains unreleased on DVD. Each of the DVD releases contain a number of exclusive bonus features, including alternative scenes, music videos and an alternative final episode of the second series.

A mixtape featuring music used in the first series was issued on 3 April 2006. A second mixtape followed on 22 October 2007. An official soundtrack to accompany the second series, entitled Dubstep Drama, was issued on 8 October 2007.

== Cast ==
=== Main cast ===
- Chanelle Scott as Dionne (Series 1—3)
- Tyler "Hoodman" Daley as Warren (Series 1—2)
- Roger Griffiths as D-Brain (Series 1—3)
- Daniel Parmar as Redhand (Series 1—2)
- Michael Coombs as Errol (Series 2—3)
- Ricci Harnett as Prangers (Series 1—3)
- Duane Henry as Drama (Series 2)
- Tendayi Jembere as Minus (Series 2)
- Adam Deacon as Bones (Series 2)
- Tulisa Contostavlos as Laurissa (Series 2—3)
- Dino Contostavlos as Sleezy (Series 2)
- Big Narstie as Bigman (Series 2—3)
- Katia Winter as Scarlett (Series 2)
- Charles Mnene as Devil (Series 3)
- Darragh Mortell as Mikey (Series 3)
- Rodney Panton as Narrator (Series 1—2)

=== Supporting cast ===
- Jess Luisa-Flynn as Susannah (Series 1)
- Abdul Salis as Melvin (Series 1)
- Duran Fulton Brown as Bagley (Series 2)
- Gemma Stone as Monica (Series 2)
- Jacquelyn Mills as Maureen (Series 2)
- Blanche Williams as Grandma (Series 2)
- Liam Reilly as Sarge (Series 2)
- Richard Rawson as Flames (Series 2)
- Isaac Ssebandeke as Millz (Series 3)
- Jamie Di Spirito as Shane (Series 3)

== Episodes ==
=== Series 1 (2005) ===
No.	Title	Directed by	Written by	Original release date
1	"Episode 1"	Luke Hyams	Luke Hyams	11 November 2005
After her debut underground performance, Dionne is witness to an attack on a local radio station by a violent gang - but is mistakenly believed to be the ringleader by the station manager, Prangers, who makes her the target of his anger. In order to ensure her own safety, Dionne is forced to flee and has no choice but to take refuge with the gang.
2	"Episode 2"	Luke Hyams	Luke Hyams	18 November 2005
Dionne's association with the gang continues to grow as she is booked to perform as the headline act an illegal rave. Her elation is short-lived, however, when she catches her cousin Warren with a stash of drugs. She has no choice but to throw Warren out, but he warns her that he will be at the mercy of a drugs kingpin who has taken a strong disliking to him.
3	"Episode 3"	Luke Hyams	Luke Hyams	25 November 2005
Dionne gives Warren a second chance, but begins to regret her decision when he gate-crashes her performance at the rave by getting into a fight with a fellow partygoer. Dionne, however, decides to put her career ahead of their relationship and goes ahead with her performance, forcing a badly injured Warren to leave alone to seek refuge from a further beating.
4	"Episode 4"	Luke Hyams	Luke Hyams	2 December 2005
Dionne successfully defeats her opponent in the rap battle, but leaves swiftly to find a badly-beaten Warren. Meanwhile, Rudy, a member of Redhead's gang, prompts him to commit an armed robbery. Subsequently, Redhead invites Dionne out for a drive, although she is blissfully unaware that she is about to be accomplice to a potentially life-changing situation.
5	"Episode 5"	Luke Hyams	Luke Hyams	9 December 2005
Dionne and Redhead are searched by the police, but manage to escape when the officers are distracted by a further crime taking place nearby. Dionne is furious when she discovers Redhead deceived her, but he ignores her anguish and decides to go ahead with the robbery anyway. Dionne decides to confront Rudy, but will her conscience get the better of her?
6	"Episode 6"	Luke Hyams	Luke Hyams	16 December 2005
Redhead is kidnapped and interrogated by Prangers, who retrieves the loot stolen in the robbery. However, when he later disposes of a chain belonging to a rival gang member, Dionne's boyfriend, Melvin, finds it and decides to wear it. When the rival gang discover Melvin is in possession of the chain, they plot to retrieve it... by any means necessary.

=== Series 2 (2007) ===
No.	Title	Directed by	Written by	Original release date
7	"Episode 1"	Luke Hyams	Luke Hyams	20 September 2007
Warren decides to sell drugs for Errol and Redhead to fund his career in music, but when Prangers is assaulted outside a nightclub, the police begin to probe his activities. Concerned that he will be caught, he pressures Dionne into hiding his stash for him - which forces her to question how far her family loyalty will actually go.
8	"Episode 2"	Luke Hyams	Luke Hyams	27 September 2007
Errol commissions Minus to create a music video to show off his talents as a director, but Minus is forced to confront his own conscience when he is witness to Errol assaulting one of the dancers featured in the film. When the police arrive, Minus struggles to decide whether or not to keep quiet - for the sake of his career.
9	"Episode 3"	Luke Hyams	Luke Hyams	4 October 2007
When Dionne and Warren are abandoned in an unfamiliar town, they begin to panic. Desperate to get home to London, they decide to steal D-Brain's limo - but in the ensuing chaos, they accidentally mow down Bones. Dionne, in fear of being arrested, decides to leave Bones at the roadside in the hope that he can't identify her.
10	"Episode 4"	Luke Hyams	Luke Hyams	11 October 2007
Dionne and Warren bump into old pal Drama, who agrees to drive them back to London. However, on the way, they make a quick detour to a nearby radio station - where Warren seizes his chance to show off his skills as an MC. Drama, however, is unimpressed, and Dionne is forced to plea for forgiveness when decides to take them back into the wilderness.
11	"Episode 5"	Luke Hyams	Luke Hyams	18 October 2007
Dionne decides to get her own back for Warren's disrespectful behaviour, and confronts him at the video shoot. Warren, however, has received word that a pair of thugs, armed with knives, are intending to gate-crash the shoot and rob the actors involved. Have given prior warning to stay clear, Warren is torn over whether or not to inform the crew.
12	"Episode 6"	Luke Hyams	Luke Hyams	25 October 2007
Bones writes a diss track against Dionne, in order to impress his friends - but the personal references to Dionne and Warren's grandmother leads to Bones receiving a harsh beating. With his own mother witness to the savage attack, she immediately phones the police. But with her son's life at risk, she is forced to make a split-second decision.
13	"Episode 7"	Luke Hyams	Luke Hyams	1 November 2007
The feud with Bones threatens to propel the Fyre Crew to new heights, but Dionne wonders at what cost.
14	"Episode 8"	Luke Hyams	Luke Hyams	8 November 2007
The Fyre Crew look for a new frontman after Dionne runs away to evade the heat from Bones' suicide.
15	"Episode 9"	Luke Hyams	Luke Hyams	15 November 2007
As the Fyre Crew falls to pieces, Dionne makes a go of it as a solo artist, but with Warren still involved with Errol & Redz, she begins to wonder how long it will be before they try to ruin her chances.
16	"Episode 10"	Luke Hyams	Luke Hyams	22 November 2007
With Warren out of the picture, Dionne and Drama finally get close, despite the threats made by Errol and Redz still hanging over them.
17	"Episode 11"	Luke Hyams	Luke Hyams	29 November 2007
Drama's emotions threaten to get the better of him after swearing revenge on those responsible for Grandma's attack.
18	"Episode 12"	Luke Hyams	Luke Hyams	6 December 2007
Dionne is faced with the hardest decision she'll ever have to make.

=== Series 3 (2009) ===
No.	Title	Directed by	Written by	Original release date
19	"Episode 1"	Luke Hyams	Luke Hyams	26 June 2009
Now signed to a major label, and with a number-one single under their belts, 'The Fam' have the entire world at their feet. However, a bitter rivalry between brothers Devil and Millz, combined with Laurissa's ever-increasing cocaine habit, and Mikey's newfound sex-addiction, prove to be the start of an enormous fall from grace.
20	"Episode 2"	Luke Hyams	Luke Hyams	3 July 2009
With the actions of their ruthless and violent manager becoming ever-more erratic, 'The Fam' find themselves surrounded by an increasingly dangerous gang culture. As their world begins to implode, fame, fortune, greed and jealousy turns each member of the group against one another - resulting in a matter of life and death.
