= Lost Consonants =

Example strip

Lost Consonants is a comic collage series created by Graham Rawle, appearing in Britain's Guardian newspaper from 1990 to 2005. The text and image word play series illustrates a sentence from which one vital letter has been removed, altering its meaning. For example: "Youths addicted to drugs" becomes "youths addicted to rugs", or instead of going days without water and becoming "thirsty", people become "thirty".

The series appeared weekly in the weekend Guardian for 15 years, as well as in the Sydney Morning Herald, Australia, for more than a year and the Globe and Mail, South Africa. It is featured regularly in a number of English language magazines including Spotlight Verlag and BBC English magazine. During its lifetime, nearly eight hundred Lost Consonants appeared in The Guardian. Eight Lost Consonants books have been published from the series.
