= Pomone =

Pomone is the name of several ships:

- Four Royal Navy ships have borne the name HMS Pomone:
  - HMS Pomone (1794), a 44-gun French frigate captured on 23 April 1794 and broken up in 1803.
  - HMS Pomone (1805), a 38-gun frigate built in 1805 and wrecked in 1811.
  - HMS Pomone, 38-gun French frigate Astrée, captured on 6 December 1810; renamed Pomone in 1811 and paid off in 1815.
  - HMS Pomone (1897), a Pelorus class cruiser built in 1897 and scrapped in 1922.
- Six ships of the French Navy have borne the name Pomone:
  - Pomone (1750–1760), a 30-gun frigate
  - Pomone (1770–1771), a transport ship
  - Pomone (built 1787, captured by British 1794, broken up 1803), a 40-gun frigate
  - Pomone (1805–1811), a 44-gun frigate
  - Pomone (1821–1830), a 28-gun corvette
  - Pomone (1845–1877), a steam frigate

Pomone can also mean:

- Prix de Pomone, a French horserace named after Pomona (French name Pomone), the Roman goddess of fruit trees, gardens and orchards.
- Pomone (opera), a French opera by Robert Cambert

== See also ==
- Pomona (disambiguation)
