= Seaman–Knapp House =

- Seaman-Knapp House
- U.S. National Register of Historic Places
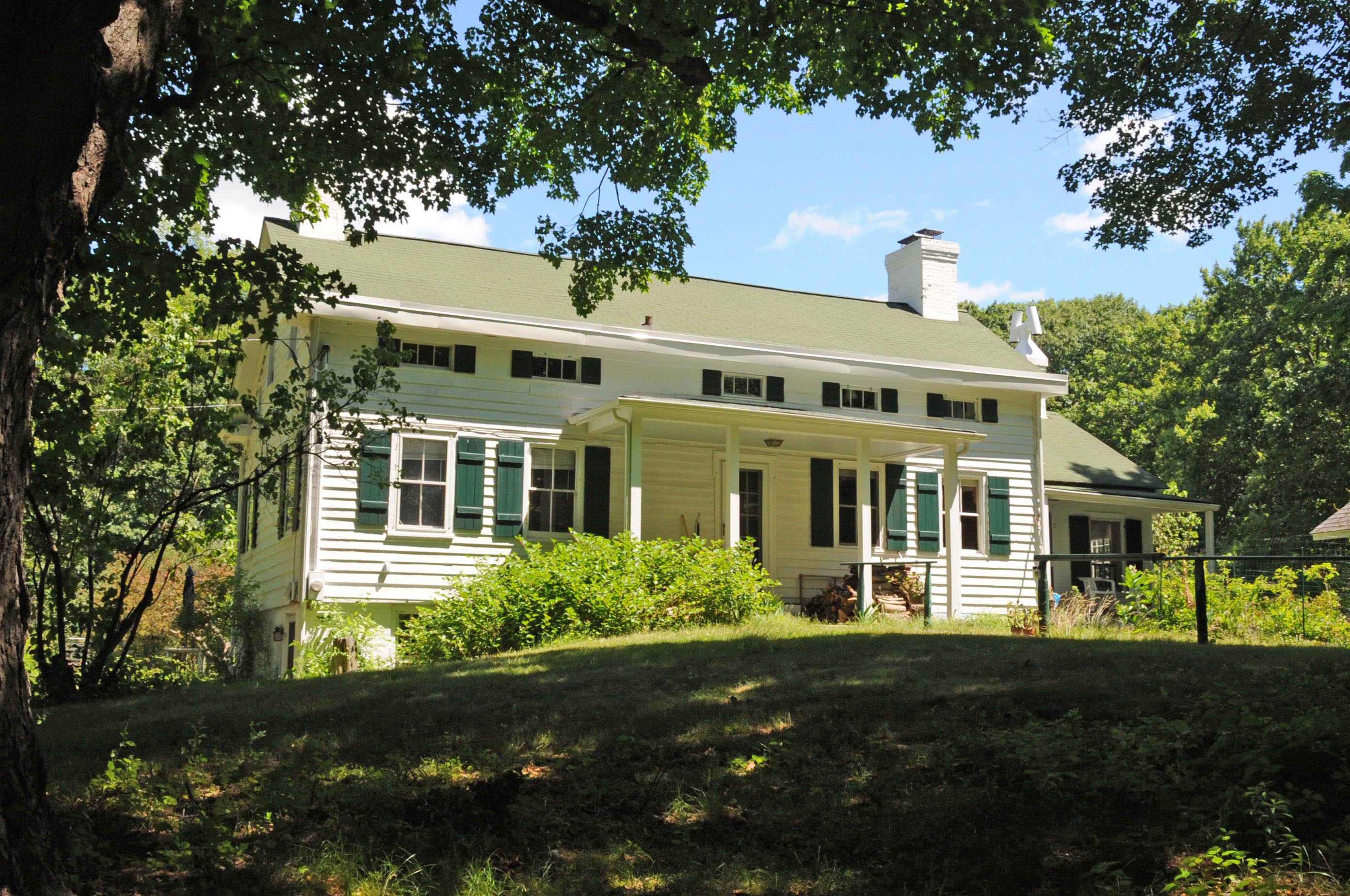
- Seaman-Knapp House, June 2016

- Location within New York Location within the United States
- Location: 35 Ladentown Rd., Pomona, New York
- Coordinates: 41°11′09″N 74°03′34″W
- Area: 16.7 acres (6.8 ha)
- Built: ca. 1799, 1937
- Architectural style: Greek Revival, Vernacular
- NRHP reference No.: 12000311
- Added to NRHP: May 24, 2012

The Seaman–Knapp House is a historic home located at Pomona, New York. It is a 1 1/2-story, five bay, frame dwelling, with Greek Revival finishes. The original section of the main block dates to about 1799, that was subsequently enlarged in the mid-19th century to its present form. A rear addition was added in the early-20th century, prior to a renovation in 1937. Also on the property is a small Seaman family burying ground and a stone-lined well with gabled hood.

It was listed on the National Register of Historic Places in 2012.
