= Ladentown United Methodist Church =

Historic church in New York, United States

- U.S. National Register of Historic Places
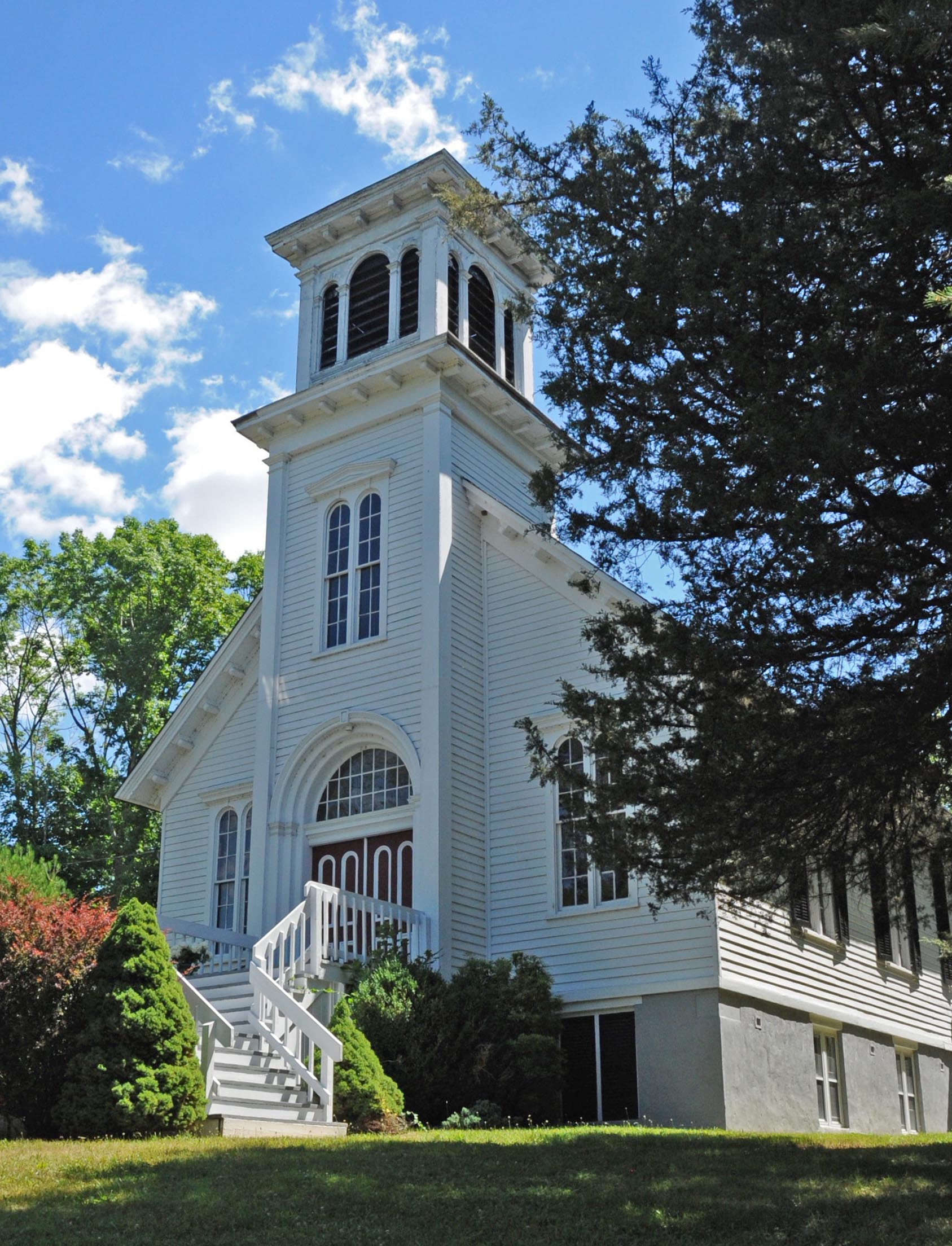

- Location within New York Location within the United States
- Location: Ladentown Rd., Pomona, New York
- Coordinates: 41°11′8″N 74°4′3″W
- Area: 1.4 acres (0.57 ha)
- Architectural style: Italianate
- NRHP reference No.: 05000990
- Added to NRHP: September 7, 2005

Ladentown United Methodist Church is a historic United Methodist church on Ladentown Road in the Village of Pomona, Rockland County, New York. It was built about 1865 and is a rectangular one story, traditional timber-frame structure above a raised basement. It features a steeply pitched gable roof and an engaged central tower.

It was listed on the National Register of Historic Places in 2005.
