= Pomona station =

Pomona station may refer to:

- Pomona–Downtown station, an Amtrak and Metrolink train station in Pomona, California, United States
- Pomona–North station, a Metrolink commuter rail and Los Angeles Metro Rail light rail station in Pomona, California, United States
- Pomona railway station, a Citytrain station in Pomona, Queensland, Australia
- Pomona tram stop, a tram stop on the Metrolink system in Manchester, England
