= Pomona (opera) =

German opera

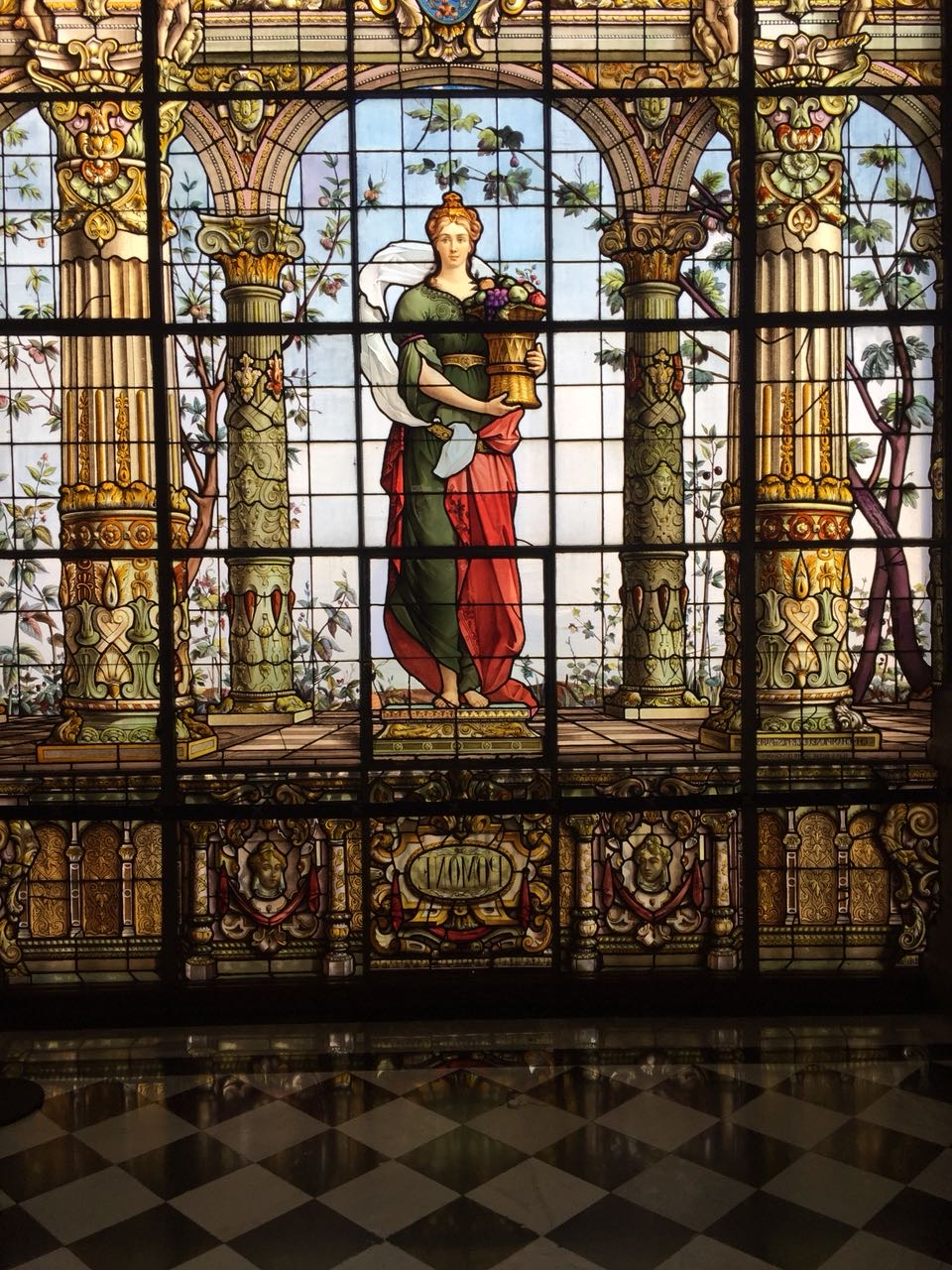
Pomona

Der Sieg der fruchtbaren Pomona (The Victory of Fruitful Pomona) is a German-language opera by Reinhard Keiser to a libretto by Christian Heinrich Postel which premiered at the Hamburg Opera on 19 October 1702, for the birthday of Frederick IV of Denmark. The plot was based on the legend of Pomona and Jupiter, and the libretto was the last of a series which the elderly poet Postel had provided to the young Keiser during the five previous opera seasons. The opera was the first of four Keiser operas dedicated to the Danish crown.

The opera was revived in 2010 by the conductor Thomas Ihlenfeldt.
