= Alistair McDowall =

British playwright

- Born: June 8, 1987 (age 39)
- Occupation: Playwright

Alistair McDowall (born 1987) is a British playwright. His work has been staged throughout the UK and internationally.

== Early life and education ==
McDowall grew up in the village of Great Broughton in North Yorkshire. He attended Stokesley School before studying Drama at The University of Manchester, graduating in 2008.

== Work ==
McDowall's play Brilliant Adventures was awarded a Bruntwood Prize in 2011, and was staged at the Royal Exchange Theatre and Live Theatre in 2013, the same year Captain Amazing premiered at Live Theatre. Captain Amazing went on to the Edinburgh Fringe and Soho Theatre that year, before embarking on a tour.

Also in 2013, Talk Show was produced at the Royal Court Theatre.

Pomona premiered at the Royal Wesh College of Music & Drama, before a slightly rewritten version was staged at the Orange Tree Theatre in 2014, then transferring to the National Theatre and the Royal Exchange in Autumn 2015. It was named "play of the decade" by Dan Rebellato.

X, a drama set on Pluto, premiered at the Royal Court Theatre in Spring 2016. McDowall's next three plays would also premiere at the Royal Court:

all of it, a one act monologue performed by Kate O'Flynn, was staged in Spring 2019; The Glow, described as a fairy tale, premiered in Spring 2022 and was award the Harold Pinter Commission; and all of it returned in Summer 2023, this time accompanied by two new pieces written for O'Flynn. This triptych transferred to Festival d'Avignon, and was published in a large-format book as Three Poems. Le Monde, in a review of the production wrote "...he uses language with virtuosity. He folds it, unfolds it, dirties it, mishandles it, and in doing so, he celebrates it."

McDowall has also written a play for young people; Zero for the Young Dudes! was produced by National Theatre Connections in 2017.

McDowall lectured in playwriting at Manchester Writing School from 2018 to 2023.

McDowall's plays have been translated and staged widely across the world.

== Selected Plays ==
- Brilliant Adventures (Royal Exchange/Live Theatre, 2013)
- Captain Amazing (Live Theatre, 2013)
- Talk Show (Royal Court Theatre, 2013)
- Pomona (Orange Tree Theatre/National Theatre/Royal Exchange, 2014;2015)
- X (Royal Court Theatre, 2016)
- Zero for the Young Dudes! (National Theatre Connections, 2017)
- all of it (Royal Court Theatre, 2019)
- The Glow (Royal Court Theatre, 2022)
- all of it (Northleigh 1940; In Stereo; all of it) (Royal Court Theatre/Festival d'Avignon, 2023)

== Awards and Fellowships ==
- Abraham Woursell Award 2016-2021
- MacDowell Fellow 2018
- Harold Pinter Commission 2018
- Bruntwood Prize for Playwriting Judge's Award 2011

== Personal life ==
McDowall lives in Manchester with his family.

His agent is Howard Gooding at Blue Posts Management.
