= Pomona, New York =

- Village
- Incorporated Village of Pomona
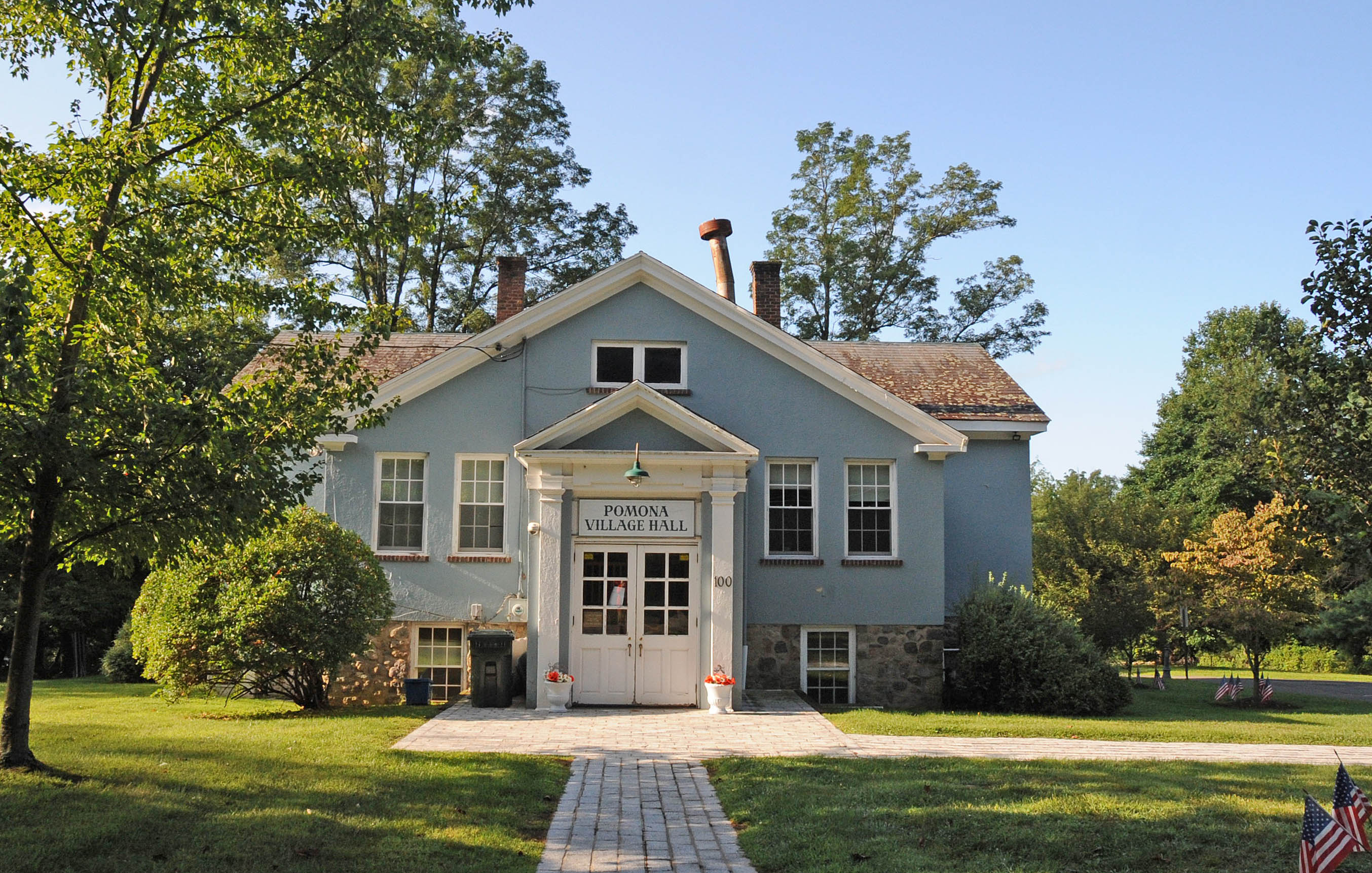
- Pomona Village Hall

- Location in Rockland County and the state of New York.

- Location within the state of New York
- Coordinates: 41°11′11″N 74°3′20″W
- Country: United States
- State: New York
- County: Rockland
- Towns: Ramapo and Haverstraw
- Incorporated: February 3, 1967

Government
  - Mayor: Ilan Fuchs
  - Deputy Mayor: Mendy Lasker
  - Trustees: Marc Greenberg, Raanan Zidile, Joel Grunwald

Area
  - Total: 2.40 sq mi (6.21 km^{2})
  - Land: 2.40 sq mi (6.21 km^{2})
  - Water: 0 sq mi (0.00 km^{2})
- Elevation: 453 ft (138 m)

Population (2020)
  - Total: 3,824
  - Density: 1,594.3/sq mi (615.56/km^{2})
- Time zone: UTC-5 (Eastern (EST))
  - Summer (DST): UTC-4 (EDT)
- ZIP code: 10970
- Area code: 845
- FIPS code: 36-58992
- GNIS feature ID: 0960875
- Website: www.pomonavillage.com

Pomona is a village partly in the town of Ramapo and partly in the town of Haverstraw in Rockland County, New York, United States. It is located north of New Hempstead, east of Harriman State Park, north of Monsey and west of Mount Ivy. According to the 2020 Census, the population was 3,824, a 23 percent increase from the 2010 figure of 3,103.

== History ==
The village of Pomona was incorporated February 3, 1967, within the towns of Ramapo and Haverstraw. Actor Burgess Meredith provided the seed money for the incorporation. Pomona was named after the goddess of fruit trees, gardens, and orchards, for the area's many apple orchards.

== Geography ==
Pomona is located at 41°11′11″N 74°3′20″W (41.186504, -74.055417).

According to the United States Census Bureau, the village has a total area of 2.4 square miles (6.2 km^{2}), 1.4 square miles (3.6 km^{2}) of which is in the town of Haverstraw and 1.0 sq mi (2.6 km^{2}) of which is in the town of Ramapo. All of Pomona's total area is land.

== Demographics ==
Historical population
Census	Pop.	Note	%±
1970	1,792		—
1980	2,421		35.1%
1990	2,611		7.8%
2000	2,726		4.4%
2010	3,103		13.8%
2020	3,824		23.2%
U.S. Decennial Census 2020

=== 2020 census ===
As of the 2020 census, Pomona had a population of 3,824 and 1,046 households. The population density was 1,572.37 inhabitants per square mile (607.10/km^{2}). There were 1,094 housing units at an average density of 449.84 per square mile (173.68/km^{2}).

The median age was 31.9 years. 33.6% of residents were under the age of 18 and 15.8% were 65 years of age or older. For every 100 females, there were 99.2 males, and for every 100 females age 18 and over, there were 102.1 males age 18 and over.

100.0% of residents lived in urban areas, while 0.0% lived in rural areas.

Of the 1,046 households, 48.6% had children under the age of 18 living in them. Of all households, 71.9% were married-couple households, 10.7% were households with a male householder and no spouse or partner present, and 14.4% were households with a female householder and no spouse or partner present. About 10.0% of all households were made up of individuals, and 6.0% had someone living alone who was 65 years of age or older.

There were 1,094 housing units, of which 4.4% were vacant. The homeowner vacancy rate was 1.1% and the rental vacancy rate was 6.3%.

Racial composition as of the 2020 census
Race	Number	Percent
White	2,745	71.8%
Black or African American	453	11.8%
American Indian and Alaska Native	0	0.0%
Asian	230	6.0%
Native Hawaiian and Other Pacific Islander	2	0.1%
Some other race	178	4.7%
Two or more races	216	5.6%
Hispanic or Latino (of any race)	301	7.9%

=== Income and poverty ===
The median household income was $125,417 and the median family income was $148,500. Males had a median income of $86,923 versus $50,156 for females. The per capita income for the village was $66,791. About 0.8% of families and 4.1% of the population were below the poverty line, including 4.22% of those under age 18 and 0.5% of those age 65 or over.

== Government ==
In March 2023, Ilan Fuchs, an adherent of the Chabad-Lubavitch movement within Hasidic Judaism, was elected Mayor of Pomona. Fuchs had already been serving on the Village's Board of Trustees, along with fellow Chabad-Lubavitch adherent Mendy Lasker. In the same election, three other Jews were elected as Trustees, joining Fuchs and Lasker–Marc Greenberg, Mendy Lasker, Raanan Zidile and Joel Grunwald.

Fuchs' predecessor as Mayor was Ian Banks, who declined to run for re-election. Ian Banks was elected in March 2019, along with Ilan Fuchs as one of his running mates; his predecessor was Brett Yagel, who in 2019 declined to run for re-election.

== Historical markers ==
- Ladentown United Methodist Church, 14 Ladentown Road (NRHP).
- The Pig Knoll School, 584 Route 306 - currently the Pomona Cultural Center.

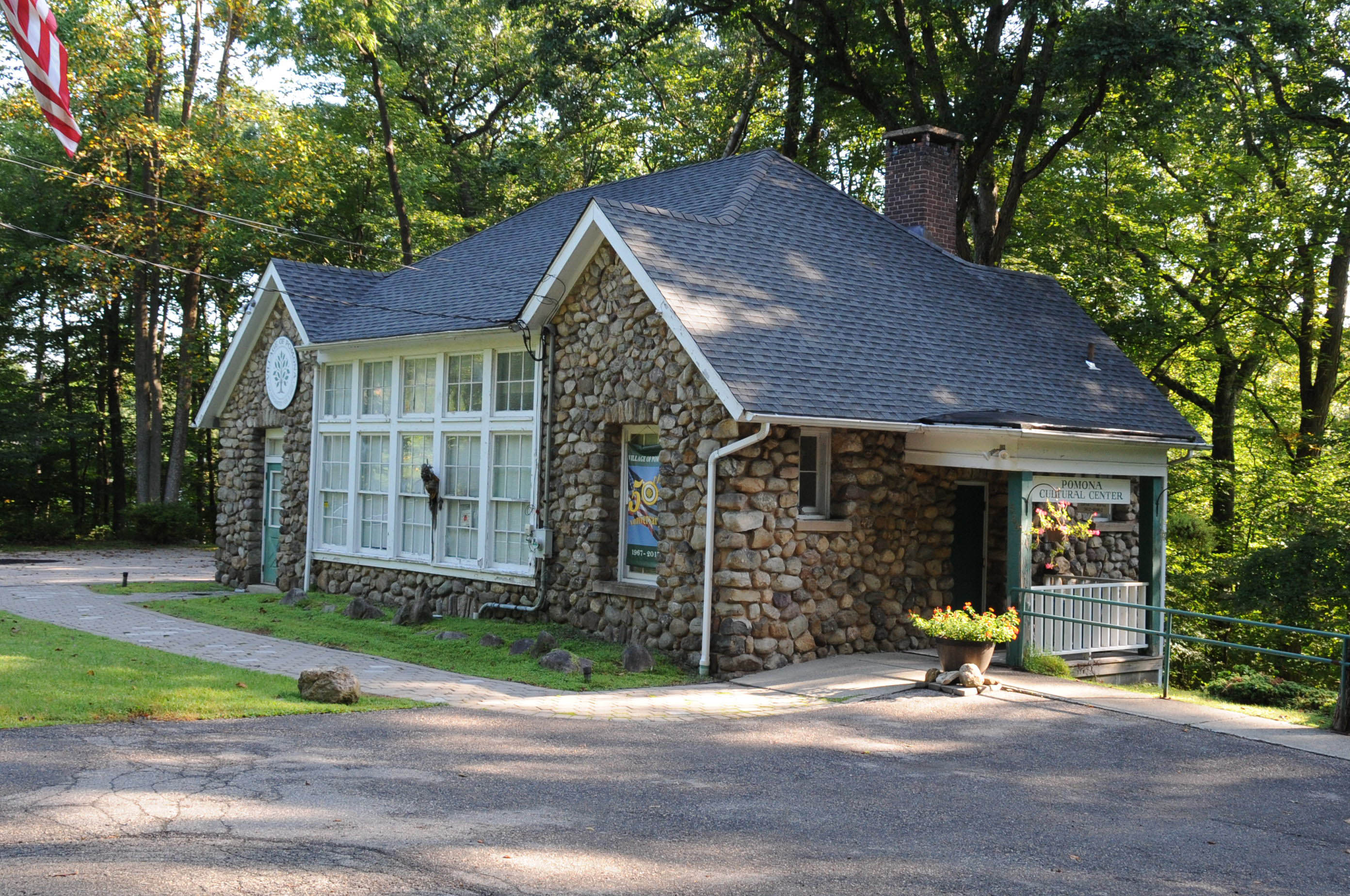
Pig Knoll School

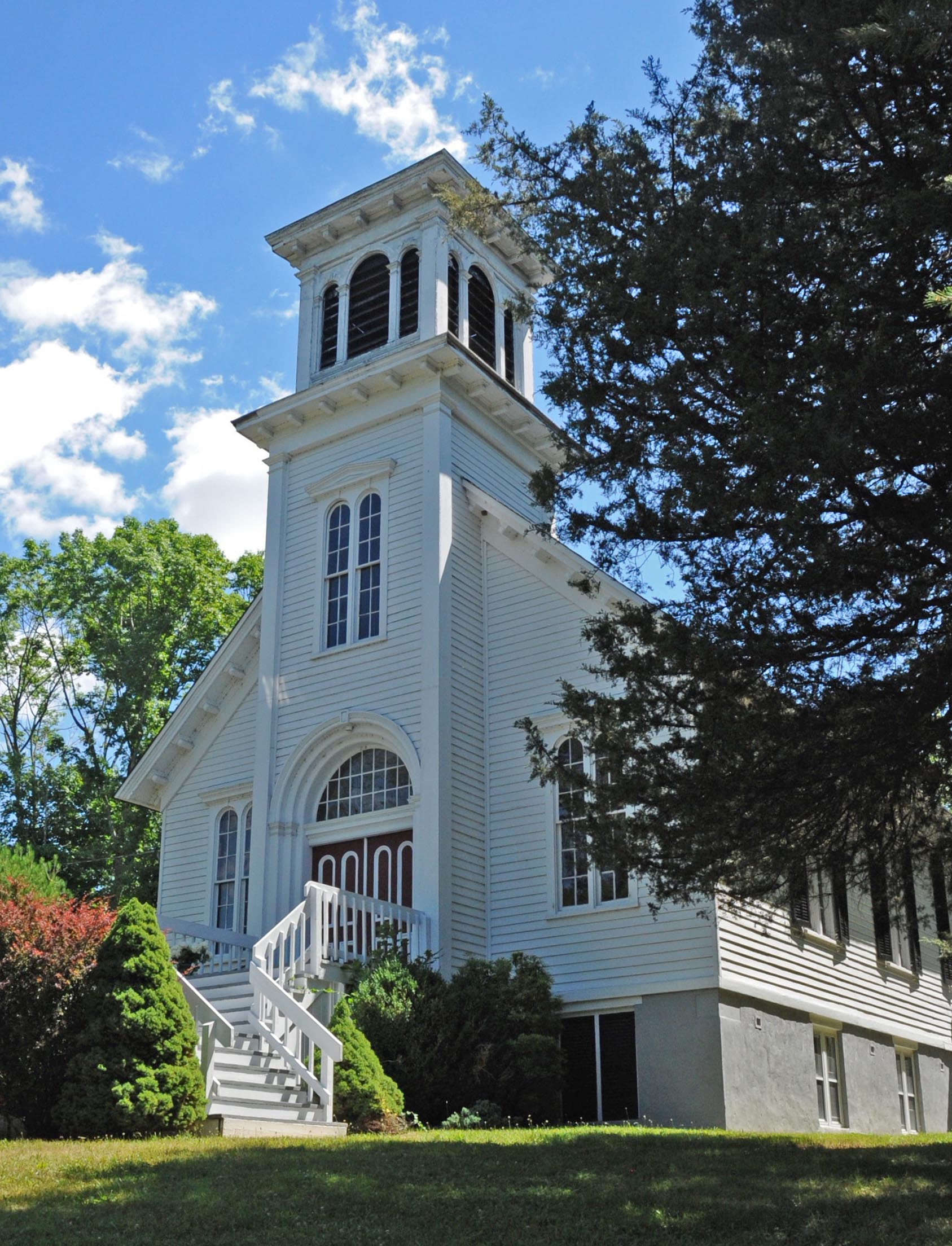
Ladentown United Methodist Church

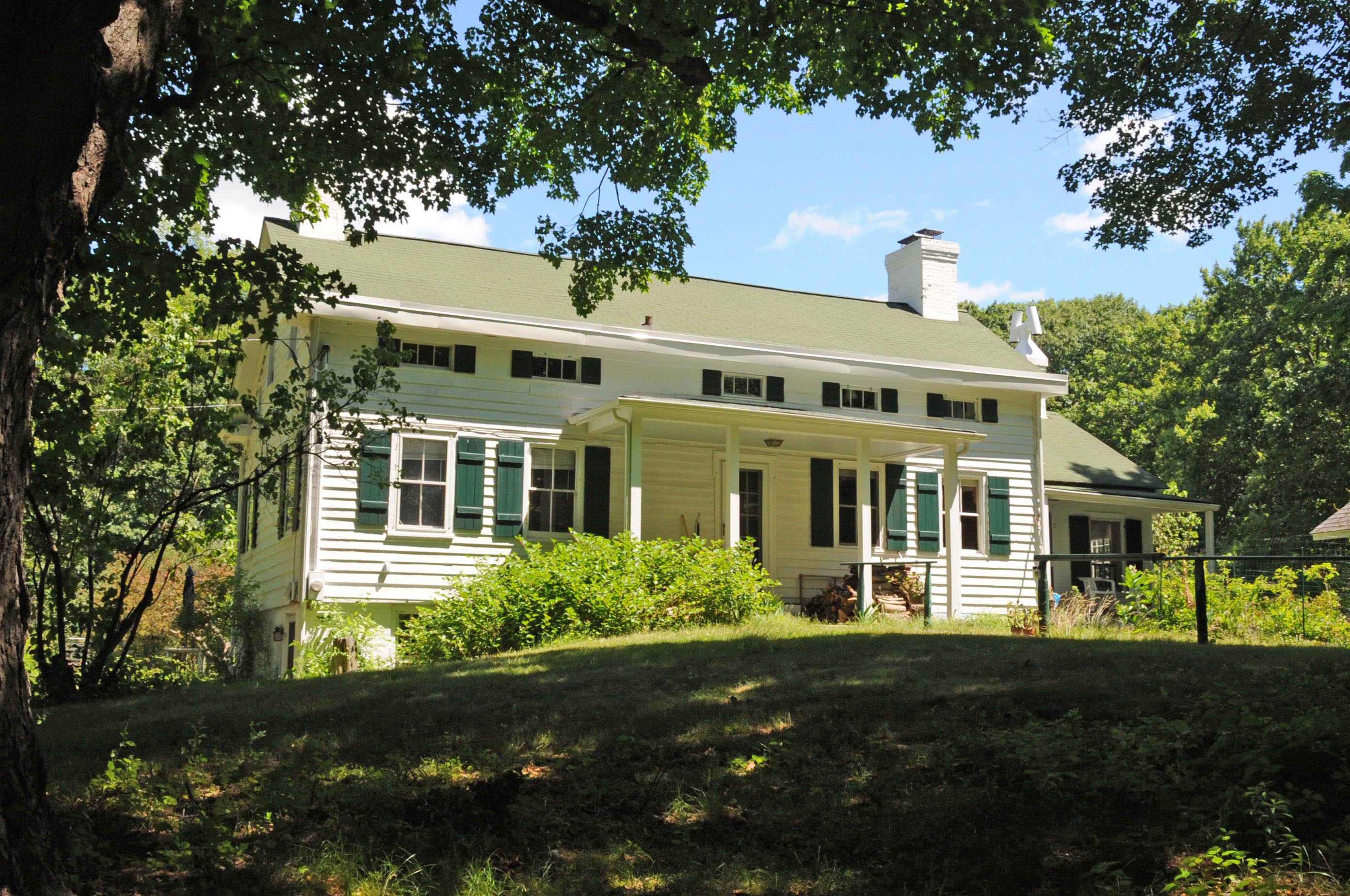
Seaman-Knapp House Circa 1799 Greek Revival Style

== Landmarks and places of interest ==
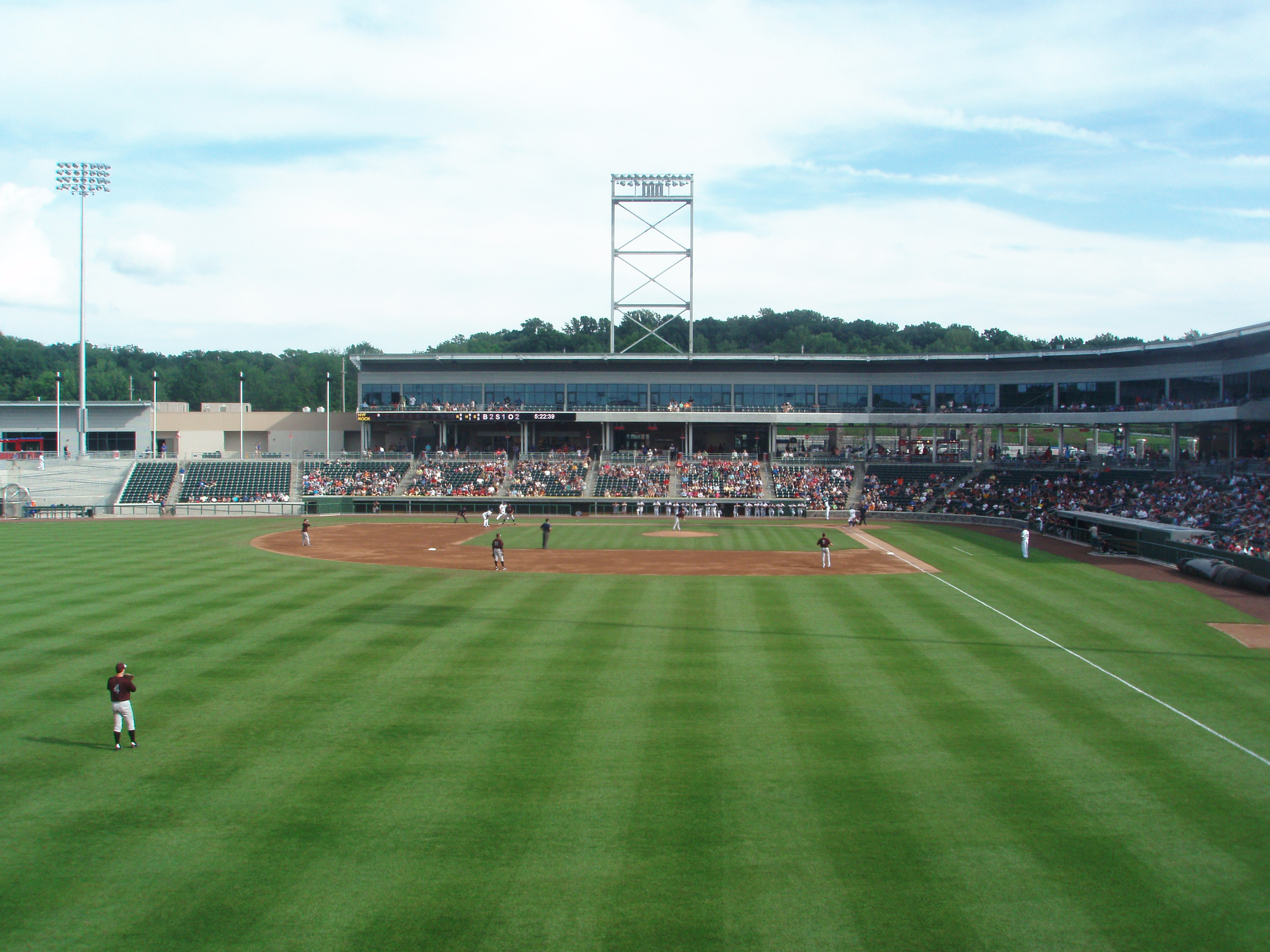
Clover Stadium

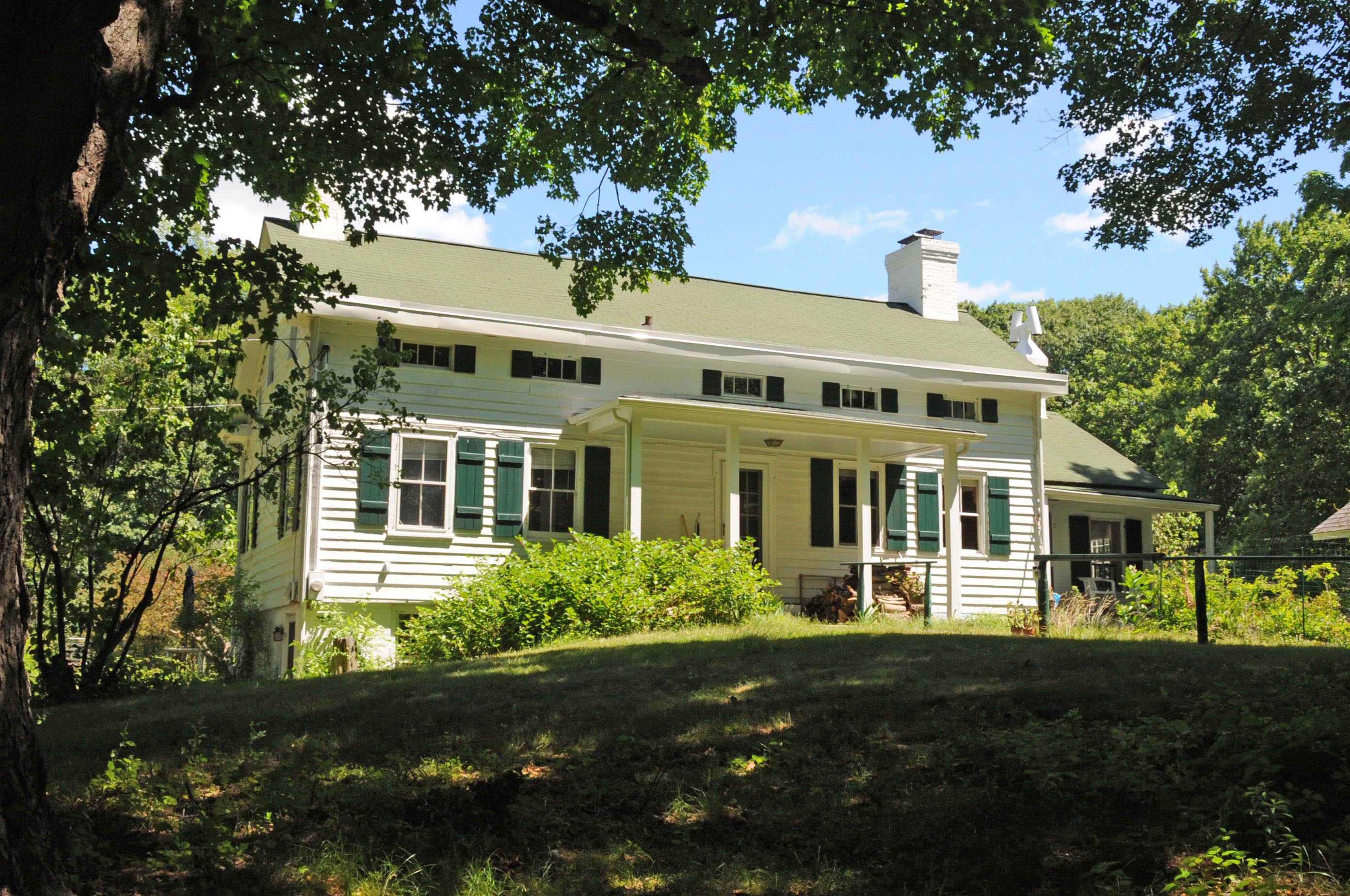
Seaman-Knapp House - 1799 Greek Revival Style

- Clover Stadium (formerly Provident Bank Park, formerly Palisades Credit Union Park)
- Pomona Cultural Center, 584 Route 306, Pomona NY 10970
- Seaman-Knapp House

== Parks ==
- Burgess Meredith
- Secor
- Van den Hende

== Sports ==
- New York Boulders (formerly Rockland Boulders) - an independent professional baseball team. They are a member of the Frontier League.
