= Vivienne Franzmann =

British playwright from Walthamstow

Vivienne Franzman
- Born: 1971 (age 54–55) Walthamstow, London
- Occupation: Playwright; teacher (formerly)
- Notable works: Mogadishu
- Notable awards: Bruntwood Prize for Playwriting (2008); George Devine Award (2011)

Vivienne Franzman (born 1971) is a British playwright from Walthamstow, whose first play, Mogadishu, was critically acclaimed on its première at the Royal Exchange, Manchester and on its transference to the Lyric Theatre, Hammersmith in 2011. Dominic Cavendish of The Telegraph called it "the play of the year". The play, based on her own experiences as a school teacher, starred Julia Ford as a teacher victimised by a student's lies after she tries to protect him.

Her next play, "Pests," opened in March, 2014 in The Royal Exchange, London. “Pests” is the story of two young sisters. Both are heroin addicts, have literacy issues, have been sexually abused as children, have been in prison, had abortions and suffer from mental illness. The lives of these two main characters revolve around violence, unemployment and poverty. Clean Break, a theater company that works with women ex-convicts or those at risk of breaking the law, commissioned the play.

== Awards ==
Franzman won the George Devine Award for most promising playwright in 2011 for Mogadishu. The play was also one of four joint winners of the Bruntwood Prize for Playwriting in 2008.
