= Shystie =

- Born: Chanel Scot Cali; 25 December 1983 (age 42); Hackney, London, England
- Genres: Grime; hip hop; electro; garage
- Occupations: Rapper; songwriter; actress
- Years active: 2003–present
- Labels: Polydor; Dice
- Website: http://www.iamshystie.com

Chanel Scot Cali (born 25 December 1983), better known by her stage name Shystie, is an English rapper, songwriter and actress.

She grew up in Hackney, East London. Shystie became famous in 2003 with her white label response to Dizzee Rascal's "I Luv U" and a tour with Basement Jaxx, The Streets and 50 Cent, which led to her being signed by major label Polydor. She is also the leading actress in the television series Dubplate Drama.

== Debut album - Diamond in the Dirt ==
Shystie's debut studio album, Diamond in the Dirt was released in the UK only in 2004 by Polydor Records.

Her debut single was "One Wish", which peaked on its first week on the UK Singles Chart at number 40, having no mainstream radio or music channels' support besides Channel U and MTV Base. The B-side was "One Wish Remix", featuring Kano and produced by Terror Danjah. Her second single was "Make It Easy" and the B-side was "Juiced"; it charted at number 57. Shystie's debut album went on to sell 60,000 copies across the UK, the same year she was nominated for 'Best Newcomer' at the MOBO Awards.

In 2004, Shystie featured in the computer game with her own character, Juiced, albeit only in the Acclaim beta version. She also recorded an accompanying song and video entitled "Juiced", which was featured on the game's beta soundtrack and her album as a bonus track. In the final version, Shystie is replaced by Sue Yen. This version of her song does not appear.

== Dubplate Drama ==
Dubplate Drama is a British television series that aired on Channel 4 between 11 November 2005 and 3 July 2009. The show was created by Luke Hyamms, Shystie and her manager. The premise of the series involved a group of young musicians, with the leading role by Shystie, who was attempting to make it big by securing a record deal. Three series of the show were broadcast. The first series contained six fifteen-minute episodes, the second contained six thirty-minute episodes, and the third contained two feature-length specials of sixty minutes each. The show was described as "the world's first interactive drama series", as it allowed viewers to vote on the outcome of each episode. The first two series were released on DVD, with the third remaining unreleased. The show was notable for its well-known British talent, including roles played by Shystie, Noel Clarke, Adam Deacon, N-Dubz and Tim Westwood.

== Kidulthood ==
In March 2006, Shystie had two songs, "One Wish" and "Woman’s World", featured in the film Kidulthood.

== Adulthood ==
In June 2008, Shystie played the role of Lisa in the film Adulthood, the sequel to Kidulthood. She wrote the theme song "Arms Open Wide" which featured on the Adulthood soundtrack.

== Sket ==
In September 2011, Shystie wrote the theme song for the feature film Sket along with writing four other songs which were used for the film.

== Illegal Activity ==
In March 2012, Shystie played the role of Toya in the short film Illegal Activity, which premiered at the Bafta HQs.

== Recent activity ==
In April and July 2011, Shystie released two mixtapes entitled You're Welcome and Blue Magic.

In September, Shystie modelled for English designer Nasir Mazhar at the London Fashion Week and was featured in Vogue for her performance.

In March 2012, Shystie released a promotional single and video for "Bad Gyal" and, in August, released her second promotional single and video for "Feel It", both from her EP Pink Mist, which was produced by LzBeatz.

In February 2013, Shystie modelled and performed at London Fashion Week again, and was featured in Vogue for the second time. The next month Shystie and Azealia Banks went from being friends to enemies after Banks posted on Twitter that Shystie and Azealia's "Control It" video was "bogus" and "not Azalea". Shystie released a diss track directed at Banks called "Doppelganger". The track replaced "Control It" as the third track on Pink Mist.

On 28 April 2013, Shystie released her EP independently through her in-house team Starwork Music, entitled Pink Mist via iTunes. It debuted at number 4 in the charts.

== Filmography ==
List of film performances as an actor
| Title | Year | Role | Notes |
|---|---|---|---|
| Dubplate Drama | 2005–2009 | Dionne | Lead role |
| Adulthood | 2008 | Lisa | - |
| Illegal Activity | 2012 | Toya | - |
| 90 Mins | 2019 | Sam | - |
| Dirty God | 2019 | Tal | - |

== Discography ==
=== Studio albums/EPs ===
| Title | Album details | Peak chart positions | | |
| Title | Album details | UK | UK IND | UK R&B |
|---|---|---|---|---|
| Diamond in the Dirt | Released: 12 July 2004; Label: Polydor; Formats: CD, digital download | — | — | — |
| Pink Mist (EP) | Released: 28 April 2013; Independent: Starwork Music; Formats: digital download | 4 | — | — |

=== Mixtapes ===
List of mixtapes
| Title | Album details |
|---|---|
| Grand Theft Audio | Released: 5 July 2005; Label: Dice Recordings; Formats: CD/DVD; 30 Tracks |
| The Treasure Chest | Released: February 2011; Label: Independent; Formats: digital download; 20 Tracks |
| You're Welcome | Released: April 2011; Label: Independent; Formats: digital download; 15 Tracks |
| Blue Magic | Released: July 2011; Label: Independent; Formats: digital download; 10 Tracks |
| Gold Dust | Released: April 2012; Label: Independent; Formats: digital download; 16 Tracks |
| Gold Dust - Vol.2 | Released: 21 September 2012; Label: Independent; Formats: digital download; 15 Tracks |

=== Singles ===
| Year | Song | UK Singles Chart | Album |
|---|---|---|---|
| 2004 | "One Wish" | 40 | Diamond in the Dirt |
| 2004 | "Make It Easy" | 57 | Diamond in the Dirt |

=== Promotional singles ===
| Song | Year | Artist(s) | Label |
|---|---|---|---|
| "I Luv U" 12" | 2003 | Shystie | 679 Recordings |
| "Shystie vs The Streets" 12" | 2003 | Shystie | 679 Recordings |
| "The Battle" 12" | 2003 | Shystie vs Lady Sovereign | Medasyn |
| "Step Bac" 12" | 2004 | Shystie | Polydor |
| "Nu Style" 12" | 2008 | Shystie | Rat Records |
| "Pull it" 12" | 2009 | Shystie | Not On A Label |
| "Bad Gyal" | 2012 | Shystie | Starwork Music |
| "Feel It" | 2012 | Shystie | Starwork Music |
| "Control It" | 2012 | Shystie feat. Azealia Banks | Not On A Label |
| "Scumbag" | 2013 | Shystie | Not On A Label |

=== Singles as featured artist ===
| Single | Year | Peak chart positions | Album |
| Single | Year | UK | Album |
|---|---|---|---|
| "Dance" (Estelle feat. Beverley Knight, Ms Dynamite, Terri Walker, Shystie and Dion) | 2010 | — | Non-album single |
| "Kick You Out" (Ms Dynamite feat. Baby Blue, No Lay, Shystie) | 2010 | — | Non-album single |
| "Lipstick (Remix)" (Alesha Dixon feat. Shystie) | 2010 | 14 | Single |
| "Neptune" (Azealia Banks feat. Shystie) | 2012 | — | Fantasea |
| "The Zoo" (Vince Kidd feat. Shystie) | 2013 | — | The Zoo EP |

=== Soundtrack appearances ===
| Song | Year | Artist(s) | Movie / Television Series |
|---|---|---|---|
| "Hold It Down" | 2006 | Fireworkz feat. Shystie | Dubplate Drama Vol.1 |
| "Make It Easy Remix" | 2006 | Shystie feat. J2K & Crazy Titch | Dubplate Drama Vol.1 |
| "One Wish" | 2006 | Shystie | Dubplate Drama Vol.1 |
| "One Wish (Remix)" | 2006 | Shystie feat. Kano, Bruza & Ron 'E' Redz | Dubplate Drama Vol.1 |
| "Street Slang" | 2006 | Shystie feat. Ron 'E' Redz | Dubplate Drama Vol.1 |
| "Rain" | 2006 | Shystie | Dubplate Drama Vol.1 |
| "House Of Cards" | 2006 | Shystie | Dubplate Drama Vol.1 |
| "Invisible Artist" | 2007 | Shystie | Dubplate Drama Vol.2 |
| "Unborn Child" | 2007 | Shystie | Dubplate Drama Vol.2 |
| "Womans World" | 2006 | Shystie | Kidulthood |
| "One Wish" | 2006 | Shystie | Kidulthood |
| "Arms Open Wide" | 2008 | Shystie | Adulthood |
| "Arms House" | 2011 | Shystie | Sket |
| "Headbanger" | 2011 | Shystie | Sket |
| "Takeover" | 2011 | Shystie | Sket |
| "Life" | 2012 | Shystie | Illegal Activity |

=== Music videos ===
| Year | Artist | Song |
|---|---|---|
| 2004 | Shystie | "Step Back" |
| 2004 | Shystie | "One Wish" |
| 2004 | Shystie | "Make It Easy" |
| 2005 | Shystie | "Juiced" |
| 2007 | Shystie | "Gutter" |
| 2008 | Shystie | "New Style" |
| 2011 | Shystie | "Ima Boss" |
| 2011 | Shystie, Ghetts, Nolay | "Sket" |
| 2011 | Shystie | "We Be Rollin'" |
| 2011 | Shystie | "Boys" |
| 2012 | Shystie | "My World" |
| 2012 | Shystie | "What They Talking About?" |
| 2012 | Shystie | "Motto" |
| 2012 | Shystie | "Underground Queen" |
| 2012 | Shystie | "House Party" |
| 2012 | Shystie | "Bad Gyal" |
| 2012 | Shystie | "Feel It" |
| 2012 | Shystie | "Niggas In Paris" |
| 2012 | Shystie | "Step Off" |
| 2012 | Shystie | "Gold Gang" |
| 2013 | Shystie, Azealia Banks | "Control It" |
| 2013 | Shystie | "Scumbag" |
| 2017 | Shystie | "Wake Up" |

=== Featured music videos ===
| Year | Artist | Song |
|---|---|---|
| 2005 | Alpha & Omega feat. Shystie | "Haze" |
| 2005 | P Jam feat. Shystie Narstie, L.Man, Solo & Demon | "Spun A Web" |
| 2005 | Fireworkz feat. J2K, Shystie, Goodz, L-Man, Narstie, Hypa & Marcie | "Hold It Down" |
| 2006 | Don Diablo feat. Shystie | "I Need To Know" |
| 2010 | Nazir Mazhar feat. Shystie | "SHOWStudio" |
| 2011 | Fireworkz feat. Bounty Killer, Ghetts, Shystie, Trilla & English Frank | "Limb By Limb" |
| 2012 | Motive feat. Shystie | "Whipped" |
| 2012 | Vince Kidd feat. Shystie, Scorcher and Exo | "Sick Love" |

== Awards and nominations ==
- MOBO Awards 2004 - Best Newcomer - nominated
- Broadcasting Press Guild Awards 2006 - Best Television Series [Dubplate Drama] - nominated
- OMA Awards 2012 - Best Female for 2011 - nominated
- OMA Awards 2012 - Best Video for a Mixtape for 2011 - nominated
- OMA Awards 2012 - Best Grime Mixtape for 2011 - nominated
