= Woman's World (novel) =

2005 novel by Graham Rawle

- First edition
- Author: Graham Rawle
- Language: English
- Genre: Fiction
- Publisher: Atlantic Books
- Publication date: 2005 (hardback); 2006 (paperback)
- Publication place: United Kingdom
- Media type: Print
- Pages: 437 pp
- ISBN: 1-84354-368-0 (paperback); ISBN 1-84354-367-2 (hardback)
- OCLC: 67873116

Woman's World is the title of a 2005 novel by Graham Rawle. It is unique for having been created entirely from fragments of text clipped from 1960s women's magazines.

The book describes itself (in its subtitle) as "a graphic novel", but anyone expecting a graphic novel in the comic book tradition will be surprised: the novel is a graphic novel in the sense that it has been constructed visually from cutouts of various '60s women's magazines. The medium of the novel creates different layers of meaning within the plot, leading to insightful, hilarious, and often heartbreaking moments.

== Construction ==
The novel contains a short postscript in which the author discusses the process of creating a novel entirely by cut-and-paste. He first drafted the novel in outline, then collated words, sentences and paragraphs from the original source material, storing them in catalogue files, before pasting each page together from the organised snippets. The pages were then scanned for mass publication.
