= Pomona (stage play) =

Stage play by Alistair McDowall

- Poster with imagery by Stuart Burgess advertising the 2015 National Theatre production of the play.
- Written by: Alistair McDowall
- Characters: 4 female, 3 male
- Original language: English
- Genre: Thriller
- Setting: Manchester

Premiere
- Date premiered: 2014
- Place premiered: Britain

Pomona is a play by Alistair McDowall that was commissioned for The Royal Welsh College of Music & Drama in 2014 and performed at The Gate Theatre in London as part of the NEW festival of plays. It then went on to the Orange Tree Theatre in Richmond, South West London, in November 2014.

The play centres on Ollie who is searching for her missing sister in Manchester. In desperation, she finds all roads lead to Pomona, an abandoned concrete island at the heart of the city. Here at the centre of everything, journeys end and nightmares are born.

The production was directed by Ned Bennett, designed by Georgia Lowe, lighting by Elliot Griggs and sound by Giles Thomas.

It was a critical success and featured in Lyn Gardner's Top 10 Theatre of 2014. The production transferred to the National Theatre and the Royal Exchange Theatre in Autumn 2015.

== Characters ==
- Ollie
- Fay
- Gale
- Keaton
- Zeppo
- Charlie
- Moe
