= Orange Tree Theatre =

Theatre in Richmond, London, England

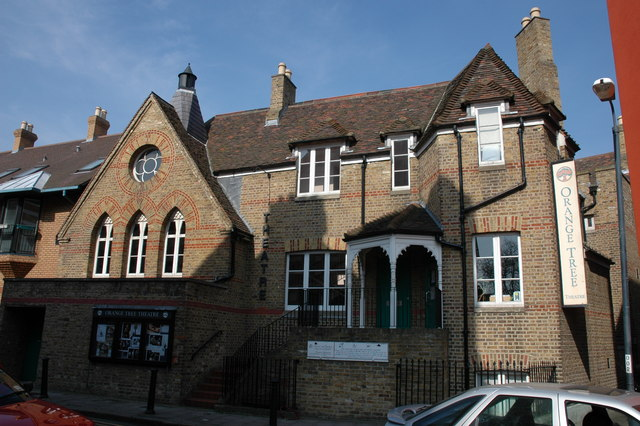
- Interactive map of Orange Tree Theatre
- Address: 1 Clarence Street, Richmond, London Borough of Richmond upon Thames; England, UK
- Coordinates: 51.5022°N 0.3875°W
- Capacity: 180
- Type: Fringe theatre; theatre in the round
- Public transit: Richmond

Construction
- Opened: 1971 (in previous venue)
- Rebuilt: 1991
- Years active: 1971–present
- Architect: believed to be Arthur Blomfield (original 1867 building)

Website
- www.orangetreetheatre.co.uk

The Orange Tree Theatre is a 180-seat theatre at 1 Clarence Street, Richmond in south-west London, which was built specifically as a theatre in the round. It is housed within a disused 1867 primary school, built in Victorian Gothic style.

The theatre was founded in 1971 by its first artistic director, Sam Walters, and his actress wife Auriol Smith in a small room above the Orange Tree pub opposite the present building, which opened in 1991.

The Orange Tree Theatre specialises in staging new plays and rediscovering classics. It has an education and participation programme that reaches over 10,000 people every year.

Since 2014 the theatre has received ten Offies, five UK Theatre Awards and the Alfred Fagon Audience Award. It received the Empty Space Peter Brook Award in 2006 and 2015.

== History ==
=== Artistic directors ===
The Orange Tree Theatre's first artistic director, Sam Walters, who founded the theatre in 1971 with his actress wife Auriol Smith, and became the UK's longest-serving theatre director, retired in June 2014 and was succeeded by Paul Miller, previously associate director at the Crucible Theatre in Sheffield. Tom Littler, previously artistic director at the Jermyn Street Theatre, took over from Miller in December 2022. In November 2026, the Orange Tree Theatre announced that Littler would be stepping down from his role to take up the post of chief executive and artistic director at the Cambridge Arts Theatre in June 2027.

=== The first Orange Tree Theatre ===
As a company the Orange Tree Theatre, then known as the Richmond Fringe, was founded on 31 December 1971 by Sam Walters and Auriol Smith in a small room above The Orange Tree pub, close to Richmond railway station. Six former church pews, arranged around the performing area, were used to seat an audience of up to 80 in number. Initially productions were staged in daylight and at lunchtimes. However, when theatre lighting and window-blinds were installed, matinee and evening performances of full-length plays also became possible. The London critics regularly reviewed its productions and the venue gained a reputation for quality and innovation, with theatregoers queuing on the stairs, waiting to purchase tickets.

=== The new Orange Tree Theatre ===
As audience numbers increased there was pressure to find a more accommodating space, both front and backstage. On 14 February 1991, the company opened its first production across the road in the current premises, the new Orange Tree Theatre. The theatre is housed within a converted primary school, St John's, which had been built in 1867 and had become derelict; the school was in Victorian Gothic style and the architect is likely to have been Arthur Blomfield.

Meanwhile, the original theatre, renamed The Room (above the pub), continued to function as a second stage for shorter runs and works in translation until 1997.

==== Design and conversion ====
The school conversion and construction design were undertaken by Iain Mackintosh as head of the Theatre Projects Consultants team. The design intent was to retain the same sense of intimacy as the old theatre, thus calling for an unusually small acting area.

The solution was to create, at stage level, no more than three rows of shallow raked seating on any side of the acting area, plus an irregular, timber-clad gallery above of only one row (which helps to "paper the wall with people") under which actors could circulate on two sides to reach the stage entrances at all four corners of the playing space. Foyers and dressing rooms were sited in the rebuilt house of the former headmaster, while the theatre space itself is built where once were the assembly hall and school playground.

Any fears that the special atmosphere of the old theatre would be lost proved unfounded, and close links were formed with the Stephen Joseph Theatre in Scarborough, also founded as an in-the-round theatre by Sir Alan Ayckbourn.

£750,000 was raised by an appeal, launched in 1988 by Richmond residents Sir Richard and Lady Attenborough.

==== 2003 extension ====
In 2003 the former Royal Bank of Scotland building next door to the new theatre was modified and re-opened as a dedicated space for rehearsals, set-building and costume storage, significantly expanding and improving the Orange Tree Theatre's operation.

==== 2020s renovations ====
The building was again renovated in 2026, with various upgrades made to improve access to the building – including replacing the steps at the front of the theatre, and tripling the number of wheelchair spaces in the auditorium. The upgrades also meant that the theatre's stage was available to wheelchair users for the first time.

== Arts Council funding ==
In July 2014, Arts Council England removed the theatre from its list of National Portfolio Organisations from 2015, which means the theatre has to bridge the funding gap with that from external sources. In July 2016, Arts Council England announced that it would be awarding £75,000 to the Orange Tree Theatre over the next three years as part of the Catalyst: Evolve fund which matches fundraised income.

== Repertory ==
As well as producing the first six plays by Martin Crimp, plays by Susan Glaspell and developing a reputation for theatrical rediscoveries, the Orange Tree repertory has also included many special seasons for the work of James Saunders, Michel Vinaver, Rodney Ackland, Václav Havel, Harley Granville Barker, Erica Gordon and Bernard Shaw and his contemporaries, including John Galsworthy. In Paul Miller's first season he presented revivals of plays by George Bernard Shaw, DH Lawrence and Doris Lessing as well as premiering plays by Alistair McDowall, Deborah Bruce and Alice Birch.

The theatre's 2014 production of Alistair McDowall's Pomona was well received by the critics and it transferred to the National Theatre and Royal Exchange Theatre in autumn 2015. Terence Rattigan's French Without Tears played two sell-out runs at the theatre then went on a UK tour with English Touring Theatre. Other rediscoveries include work by Robert Holman, Sharman Macdonald, Clare McIntyre and Caryl Churchill. New plays have included the world premieres of Jess and Joe Forever by Zoe Cooper and The Brink by Brad Birch, the UK premiere of Winter Solstice by Roland Schimmelpfennig and the European premiere of An Octoroon by Branden Jacobs-Jenkins.

== Training directors ==
From 1986 to 2014 the theatre ran a trainee director scheme, each year appointing two young assistant directors. Graduates of this scheme included Rachel Kavanaugh, Timothy Sheader, Sean Holmes, Dominic Hill, and Anthony Clark. This was replaced by a Resident Director position in 2014/15. The Orange Tree currently runs an MA in Theatre Directing with St Mary's University, Twickenham which started in 2016–17.

== Awards ==
Since 2014 the theatre has received ten Offies, five UK Theatre Awards and the Alfred Fagon Audience Award. The Orange Tree Theatre won the Empty Space Peter Brook Award in 2006 and 2015. In 2017 it was the London regional winner for UK's Most Welcoming Theatre Award 2017.

== See also ==
- Off West End
- Richmond Theatre (London)

== Sources ==
- Ronnie Mulryne and Margaret Shewring (1995). Making Space for Theatre, Stratford-upon-Avon: Mulryne & Shewring Ltd. ISBN 1-900065-00-2.
- Theatre Record and its annual indexes
