= Diamond in the Dirt (album) =

Studio album by Shystie
- Released: 12 July 2004
- Recorded: 2003–2004
- Genre: Hip hop; garage; grime
- Length: 57:34
- Label: Polydor

Singles from Diamond in the Dirt
- 1. "One Wish" Released: 5 July 2004; 2. "Make It Easy" Released: 20 September 2004

Professional ratings
Review scores
Source	Rating
AllMusic	3.5/5 stars
BBC	(not rated)
Evening Standard	4/5 stars
Guardian	3/5 stars
Independent	1/5 stars
Times Online	3/5 stars

Diamond in the Dirt is the debut studio album by English rapper Shystie. It was released on 12 July 2004 and includes the singles "One Wish" and "Make It Easy".

== Track listing ==
No.	Title	Length
1.	"Intro"	2:04
2.	"One Wish"	4:08
3.	"Gutter"	4:33
4.	"Step Bac"	4:18
5.	"Woman's World (Gurlz Stand Up)"	3:29
6.	"Questions (Game Show)"	5:45
7.	"Make It Easy"	4:22
8.	"Unfinished Bizzness"	4:24
9.	"Bank Robbery" (featuring Ron, E Redeyez)	4:45
10.	"Get Loose"	4:19
11.	"Can't Play"	3:47
12.	"Skit"	0:32
13.	"Somedayz"	4:27
14.	"Armshouse" (Bonus Track)	3:25
15.	"Juiced" (Bonus Track)	3:16
