= List of awards and nominations received by Lynne Ramsay =

List of Lynne Ramsay awards
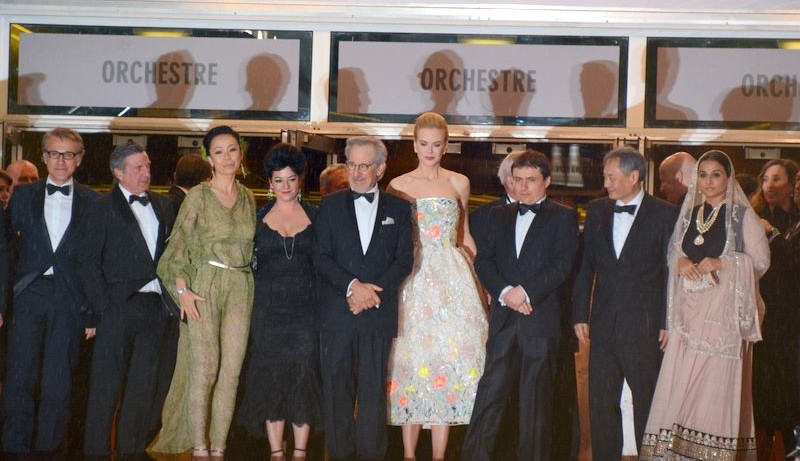
Award	Wins	Nominations
British Academy Film Award	2	8
British Independent Film Award	2	10
Independent Spirit Awards	0	2

Lynne Ramsay is a Scottish filmmaker and cinematographer. She is known for her short films, such as Gasman (1997), and her feature films Ratcatcher (1999), We Need to Talk About Kevin (2011), and You Were Never Really Here (2017). She has received seven British Academy Film Award nominations winning twice for Ratcatcher (1999) and Swimmer (2012). She has also received seven British Independent Film Award nominations and two Independent Spirit Award nominations. She has received four prizes at the Cannes Film Festival and her films We Need to Talk About Kevin (2011), You Were Never Really Here (2017) and Die My Love (2025) competed for the prestigious Palme d'Or.

== Major associations ==
=== British Academy Film Awards ===
Year	Category	Nominated work	Result	Ref.
1998	Best Short Film	Gasman	Nominated	
2000	Outstanding British, Writer, Director or Producer	Ratcatcher	Won	
2000	Outstanding British Film	Ratcatcher	Nominated	
2012	Outstanding British Film	We Need to Talk About Kevin	Nominated	
2012	Best Direction	We Need to Talk About Kevin	Nominated	
2013	Best Short Film	Swimmer	Won	
2019	Outstanding British Film	You Were Never Really Here	Nominated	
2026	Outstanding British Film	Die My Love	Nominated	

=== British Independent Film Awards ===
Year	Category	Nominated work	Result	Ref.
1999	Best Debut Director	Ratcatcher	Won	
1999	Best Screenplay	Ratcatcher	Nominated	
2002	Best Director	Morvern Callar	Nominated	
2002	Best Screenplay	Morvern Callar	Nominated	
2011	Best Director	We Need to Talk About Kevin	Won	
2011	Best Screenplay	We Need to Talk About Kevin	Nominated	
2017	Best British Independent Film	You Were Never Really Here	Nominated	
2017	Best Director	You Were Never Really Here	Nominated	
2017	Best Screenplay	You Were Never Really Here	Nominated	
2025	Best Director	Die My Love	Nominated	

=== Cannes Film Festival ===
Year	Category	Nominated work	Result	Ref.
1996	Jury Prize Short film	Small Deaths	Won	
1998	Jury Prize Short film	Gasman	Won	
2002	Award of the Youth	Morvern Callar	Won	
2011	Palme d'Or	We Need to Talk About Kevin	Nominated	
2017	Palme d'Or	You Were Never Really Here	Nominated	
2017	Best Screenplay	You Were Never Really Here	Won	
2025	Palme d'Or	Die My Love	Nominated	

=== Independent Spirit Awards ===
Year	Category	Nominated work	Result	Ref.
2019	Best Film	You Were Never Really Here	Nominated	
2019	Best Director	You Were Never Really Here	Nominated	

== Critics awards ==
Year	Category	Nominated work	Result
1997	Atlantic Film Festival Best Short film	Gasman	Won
1997	Chicago International Film Festival Best Short film	Gasman	Won
1997	Locarno International Film Festival Best Short film	Gasman	Won
1999	Chicago International Film Festival Silver Hugo Directing Award	Ratcatcher	Won
1999	Edinburgh International Film Festival New Director's Award	Ratcatcher	Won
1999	London Critics Circle Film Award for British Director of the Year	Ratcatcher	Won
2002	Los Angeles Film Critics Association New Generation Award	Morvern Callar	Won
2011	BFI London Film Festival Best Film Award	We Need to Talk About Kevin	Won
2011	BIFA for Best Director	We Need to Talk About Kevin	Won
2011	Evening Standard British Film Award for Best Film	We Need to Talk About Kevin	Won
2011	Dallas-Fort Worth Film Critics Association Russell Smith Award	We Need to Talk About Kevin	Won
2011	Writers' Guild of Great Britain Award for Best Film Screenplay	We Need to Talk About Kevin	Won
2011	AACTA International Award for Best Direction	We Need to Talk About Kevin	Nominated
2011	AACTA International Award for Best Screenplay	We Need to Talk About Kevin	Nominated
2011	Bodil Award for Best American Film	We Need to Talk About Kevin	Nominated
2011	London Film Critics' Circle Award for Director of the Year	We Need to Talk About Kevin	Nominated
2011	Online Film Critics Society Award for Best Adapted Screenplay	We Need to Talk About Kevin	Nominated
2017	Noir Film Festival Special Jury Award	You Were Never Really Here	Won
