= Des Hamilton (casting director) =

Entertainment industry professional

Des Hamilton is a casting director who began casting in 2001 when fellow Glaswegian Lynne Ramsay asked him to help find a non-actress to play the co-lead opposite Samantha Morton in Morvern Callar. He went on to cast the whole film, street casting Kathleen McDermott, who went on to win the BAFTA award for best scripted casting. He is based in London, with offices in Glasgow too.

== Filmography ==
=== Television credits ===
Year	Name	Director	Notes
2011–2019	Top Boy	Nia DaCosta	Winner (First Ever) - BAFTA Award for Best Casting
2017	Gun Powder	J Blakeson	
2014	Glue	Daniel Nettheim	
2013	Privado	Jim Hosking	
2008	Fallout	Ian Rickson	

=== Film credits ===
Year	Name	Director	Notes
2019	Jojo Rabbit	Taika Waititi	Winner – Artios CSA Award 2020
2019	The King	David Michod	
2018	High Life	Claire Denis	
2016	Adult Life Skills	Rachel Tunnard	
2012	Swimmer	Lynne Ramsay	
2011	Melancholia	Lars Von Trier	
2011	Wuthering Heights	Andrea Arnold	
2011	Tyrannosaur	Paddy Considine	
2010	Four Lions	Chris Morris	
2009	Enter The Void	Gaspar Noé	
2008	Bronson	Nicolas Winding Refn	
