= British Independent Film Awards 1999 =

British awards ceremony

2nd British Independent Film Awards
- Awarded for: Best in British independent film
- Date: 14 October 1999
- Site: Cafe Royal, London
- Hosted by: John Gordon Sinclair
- Official website: www.bifa.film

Highlights
- Best Film: Wonderland
- Most awards: Hilary and Jackie (2)
- Most nominations: The War Zone (5)

The second British Independent Film Awards were held on 14 October 1999 to recognise the best in British independent cinema and filmmaking talent from United Kingdom.

As previously, only films intended for theatrical release, and those which had a public screening to a paying audience either on general release in the UK or at a British film festival were eligible for consideration. In addition, they needed to have been produced or majority co-produced by a British company, or in receipt of at least 51% of their budget from a British source. Lastly, they could not be solely funded by a single studio.

The award ceremony, hosted by John Gordon Sinclair, was held for the second year in succession at the Café Royal, in London's West End. Winners in eleven categories were selected from the shortlists and a further two were awarded entirely at the jury's discretion, whose make up included Chris Auty, Daneil Weinzweig, Hossein Amini, Michiyo Yoshizaki, Norma Heyman, Pippa Cross, Richard Jobson, Sadie Frost and Sarah Radclyffe.

== Winners and nominees ==
Best British Independent Film	Best Director
Wonderland – Michael Winterbottom; A Room for Romeo Brass – Shane Meadows; Gods and Monsters – Bill Condon; Hilary and Jackie – Anand Tucker; The War Zone – Tim Roth	Anand Tucker – Hilary and Jackie; Bill Condon – Gods and Monsters; Shane Meadows – A Room for Romeo Brass; Tim Roth – The War Zone; Michael Winterbottom – Wonderland
Best Actor	Best Actress
Ian McKellan – Gods and Monsters as James Whale; Daniel Auteuil – The Lost Son as Xavier Lombard; Michael Caine – Little Voice as Ray Say; Daniel Craig – The Trench as Sgt. Telford Winter; Ray Winstone – The War Zone as Dad	Emily Watson – Hilary and Jackie as Jacqueline du Pré; Lara Belmont – The War Zone as Jessie; Rachel Griffiths – Hilary and Jackie as Hilary du Pré; Jane Horrocks – Little Voice as LV; Gina McKee – Wonderland as Nadia
Most Promising Newcomer	Best Screenplay
Lara Belmont – The War Zone as Jessie; Keri Arnold – The Darkest Light as Catherine; Simon Bowles – Lighthouse (Production designer); Alwin H. Küchler – Ratcatcher (Cinematographer); Eileen Walsh – Janice Beard 45wpm as Janice Beard	Ayub Khan Din – East is East; Jasmin Dizdar – Beautiful People; David Kane – This Year's Love; Shane Meadows and Paul Fraser – A Room for Romeo Brass; Lynne Ramsey – Ratcatcher
Best International Independent Film (English Language)	Best International Independent Film (Foreign Language)
Happiness – Todd Solondz; Buffalo '66 – Vincent Gallo; Praise – John Curran; Rushmore – Wes Anderson; The Blair Witch Project – Daniel Myrick and Eduardo Sánchez	All About My Mother – Pedro Almodóvar; The Celebration – Thomas Vinterberg; The Dreamlife of Angels – Erick Zonka; Life is Beautiful – Roberto Benigni; Romance – Catherine Breillat
Douglas Hickox Award (Best Debut Director)	Best Achievement in Production
Lynne Ramsey – Ratcatcher; Jasmin Dizdar – Beautiful People; Damien O'Donnell – East is East; Justin Kerrigan – Human Traffic; Clare Kilner – Janice Beard 45wpm	Allan Niblo – Human Traffic; Christopher Nolan, Jeremy Theobald and Emma Thomas – Following; Stephen Taylor, Patricia Carr, Helena Spring and Anant Singh – Get Real; Tim Dennison, Mark Leake and Chris Craib – Lighthouse; Steve Clark-Hall – The Trench
Producer of the Year (Note: In 1999 BIFA decided to offer nominations for Producer of the year for the first time, in recognition of the wealth of production talent displayed that year)
Simon Channing Williams (Note: Archived websites of the time including the BBC, Variety and BIFA itself list the Simon Channing Williams as the winner. The current (2024) BIFA website lists Barnaby Thomson on the 1999 winners page but correctly states Channing Williams on other pages); Graham Broadbent; Steve Clark-Hall; Sam Taylor; Barnaby Thompson
Special Jury Prize	Lifetime Achievement Award
Simon Perry (of British Screen)	Nicolas Roeg

=== Films with multiple nominations ===
Nominations	Film
5	The War Zone
4	Hilary and Jackie
3	Wonderland
3	A Room for Romeo Brass
3	Gods and Monsters
3	Ratcatcher
2	Little Voice
2	The Trench
2	Lighthouse
2	Janice Beard 45wpm
2	East is East
2	Human Traffic
