= Onwurah =

Onwurah is a surname. Notable people with the surname include:

- Chi Onwurah (born 1965), British politician
- Ngozi Onwurah (born 1966), British-Nigerian film director, producer, model, and lecturer
