= Lucia Zucchetti =

Italian film editor

- Born: Monza, Italy
- Occupation: Film editor

Lucia Zucchetti is an Italian film editor. Born in Monza, Zucchetti became interested in film attending the ninth grade at ITSOS (Istituto tecnico statale ordinamento speciale), an experimental secondary school in Milan influenced by the free school movement of the 1960s. She graduated with a baccalaureate in film from the University of Westminster, where she became specialized in editing. In 2008, she won a BAFTA TV Award of Best Editing for Boy A (2007). She also received nominations for a BAFTA Film Award for The Queen (2006) and a Primetime Emmy Award for Game Change (2012).

== Partial filmography ==
Year	Title
1999	Ratcatcher
2002	Long Time Dead
2002	Morvern Callar
2003	Intermission
2003	The Deal
2004	The Merchant of Venice
2005	Mrs Henderson Presents
2006	The Queen
2007	Boy A
2009	Chéri
2012	Game Change
2012	I Am Nasrine
2013	Closed Circuit
2014	Testament of Youth
2016	Our Kind of Traitor
2016	Their Finest
2017	Woman Walks Ahead
2018	Colette
2023	One Life
