= Little Birds (TV series) =

British drama TV series

- Genre: Drama
- Based on: Little Birds by Anaïs Nin
- Developed by: Sophia Al Maria
- Written by: Sophia Al Maria; Stacey Gregg; Ruth McCance
- Directed by: Stacie Passon
- Starring: Juno Temple; Yumna Marwan; Hugh Skinner; Raphael Acloque; Rossy de Palma; Nina Sosanya; Matt Lauria; Kamel Labroudi; Amy Landecker; Jean-Marc Barr; David Costabile
- Composer: Anne Nikitin
- Country of origin: United Kingdom
- Original language: English
- No. of series: 1
- No. of episodes: 6

Production
- Executive producers: Kara Manley; Peter Carlton; Ruth McCance; Mark Herbert; Stacie Passon
- Producers: Ruth McCance; Peter Carlton
- Cinematography: Ed Rutherford
- Editor: Celia Haining
- Running time: 49–50 minutes
- Production company: Warp Films

Original release
- Network: Sky Atlantic
- Release: 4 August – 1 September 2020

Little Birds is a British drama television series starring Juno Temple and produced by Warp Films. Inspired by Anaïs Nin's posthumously published 1979 collection of erotic short stories of the same name, Little Birds weaves stories of love and desire together with personal drama and political intrigue, set against a distinctive backdrop of hedonism and conflict. The series was filmed in Andalucia with studio elements in Manchester.

The six-episode series premiered on Sky Atlantic and Now TV on 4 August 2020.

== Premise ==
Little Birds is set in Tangier International Zone in 1955, one of the last outposts of colonial decadence, and a culture shock in more ways than one for American debutante Lucy Savage (Juno Temple). Lucy desires an unconventional life free from the societal cage she's been kept in and, along with Tangier itself, finds herself on the cusp of achieving a painful yet necessary independence.

== Cast and characters ==
=== Main ===
- Juno Temple as Lucy Savage Cavendish-Smyth
- Yumna Marwan as Cherifa Lamour
- Hugh Skinner as Hugo Cavendish-Smyth
- Raphael Acloque as Adham Abaza
- Rossy de Palma as Contessa Mandrax
- Nina Sosanya as Lili von X
- Matt Lauria as Bill
- Kamel Labroudi as Leo
- Amy Landecker as Vanessa Savage
- Jean-Marc Barr as Secretary Pierre Vaney
- David Costabile as Grant Savage

=== Supporting ===
- Alexander Albrecht as Frederic
- Fady Elsayed as Aziz

== Episodes ==
No.	Title	Directed by	Written by	Original release date
1	"Episode 1"	Stacie Passon	Sophia Al Maria	4 August 2020
2	"Episode 2"	Stacie Passon	Sophia Al Maria	4 August 2020
3	"Episode 3"	Stacie Passon	Sophia Al Maria	11 August 2020
4	"Episode 4"	Stacie Passon	Sophia Al Maria	18 August 2020
5	"Episode 5"	Stacie Passon	Sophia Al Maria & Stacey Gregg	25 August 2020
6	"Episode 6"	Stacie Passon	Ruth McCance	1 September 2020

== Production ==
In February 2019, it was announced Juno Temple, Yumna Marwan and Raphael Acloque had joined the cast of the series, with Stacie Passon directing from a screenplay by Sophia Al-Maria, and Warp Films producing. In April 2019, Hugh Skinner, Jean-Marc Barr, Rossy de Palma and Nina Sosanya joined the cast. In June 2019, Dave Constabile, Amy Landecker and Matt Lauria joined the cast. Anne Nikitin composed the score.

=== Filming ===
Principal photography began in March 2019. Production on the series took place in Tarifa, Spain and Manchester, England. Production concluded in June 2019.

=== Release ===
The series aired on Sky Atlantic in the United Kingdom and Sky in Spain. In Australia, it is available on Stan. The series made its US premiere on the Starz channel on 6 June 2021.
