= Alwin H. Küchler =

German cinematographer

Alwin H. Küchler (born 1965) is a German cinematographer.

== Early life and education ==
Born in Düsseldorf, Küchler started his career as assistant to a fashion photographer.

When he supported his friend Jakob Claussen, who later became a film producer, during the production of a study film, Küchler became interested in cinematography.

From 1990 to 1994 Küchler studied cinematography at the National Film and Television School. During his study he met Lynne Ramsay and realized a few short films with her. In 1999 he made his feature film debut with Ramseys Ratcatcher.

== Personal life ==
Küchler is married to director Ngozi Onwurah. They have one daughter.

== Filmography ==
=== Documentary film ===
Year	Title	Director	Notes
1993	Monday's Girls	Ngozi Onwurah	
1999	One Day in September	Kevin Macdonald	With Neve Cunningham
2012	Marley	Kevin Macdonald	With Mike Eley
2016	One More Time with Feeling	Andrew Dominik	With Benoît Debie

=== Television ===
Miniseries

Year	Title	Director	Notes
1994	Siren Spirits	Ngozi Onwurah	Episode "White Men Are Cracking Up"
1996	Crucial Tales	Ngozi Onwurah; Danny Thompson	Episodes "I Bring You Frankincense" and "Spiders and Flies"
1997	Lloyds Bank Channel 4 Film Challenge	Richard Clark	Episode "My Dead Buddy"
2001	In a Land of Plenty	Hettie Macdonald; David Moore	
2024	The Regime	Stephen Frears; Jessica Hobbs	

TV movie

Year	Title	Director
2003	The Deal	Stephen Frears

=== Feature film ===
Year	Title	Director	Notes
1995	Welcome II the Terrordome	Ngozi Onwurah	
1999	Ratcatcher	Lynne Ramsay	
2000	The Claim	Michael Winterbottom	
2001	Lucky Break	Peter Cattaneo	
2002	Morvern Callar	Lynne Ramsay	
2002	Heartlands	Damien O'Donnell	
2003	Code 46	Michael Winterbottom	With Marcel Zyskind
2003	The Mother	Roger Michell	
2005	Proof	John Madden	
2007	Sunshine	Danny Boyle	
2009	Solitary Man	Brian Koppelman; David Levien	
2010	Morning Glory	Roger Michell	
2011	Hanna	Joe Wright	
2013	R.I.P.D.	Robert Schwentke	
2014	Divergent	Neil Burger	
2015	Steve Jobs	Danny Boyle	
2021	The Mauritanian	Kevin Macdonald	
2023	Tetris	Jon S. Baird	
2023	The Marsh King's Daughter	Neil Burger	
2025	Goodbye June	Kate Winslet	
2026	Ink	Danny Boyle	

== Awards and nominations ==
Year	Title	Awards and nominations
1999	Ratcatcher	Nominated- British Independent Film Award for Most Promising Newcomer
2002	Morvern Callar	British Independent Film Award for Best Technical Achievement; Nominated- European Film Award for Best Cinematographer
2003	Code 46	Nominated- European Film Award for Best Cinematographer
2021	The Mauritanian	Nominated - BAFTA Award for Best Cinematography; Nominated - British Society of Cinematographers Award for Best Cinematography
