= British Independent Film Award for Best Performance by an Actress in a British Independent Film =

Annual British film award

British Independent Film Award for Best Actress
- Awarded for: Best Performance by an Actress in a British Independent Film
- Country: United Kingdom
- Presented by: BIFA
- First award: 1998
- Final award: Joanna Scanlan – After Love (2021)
- Website: www.bifa.org.uk

The British Independent Film Award for Best Performance by an Actress in a British Independent Film was an annual award given by the British Independent Film Awards (BIFA) to recognize the best leading performance by an actress in a British independent film. The award was first presented in the 1998 ceremony with Kathy Burke being the first recipient of the award for her performance as Valerie in Nil by Mouth.

With two wins each, Carey Mulligan and Olivia Colman are the only nominees who have won more than once. Samantha Morton holds the record of most nominations with five, followed by Judi Dench with four.

In July 2022, it was announced that the performance categories would be replaced with gender-neutral categories, with both Best Actor and Best Actress merging into the Best Lead Performance category. Additionally, a category named Best Joint Lead Performance was created for "two (or exceptionally three) performances that are the joint focus of the film, especially where performances share a large number of scenes and screen time".

== Winners and nominees ==
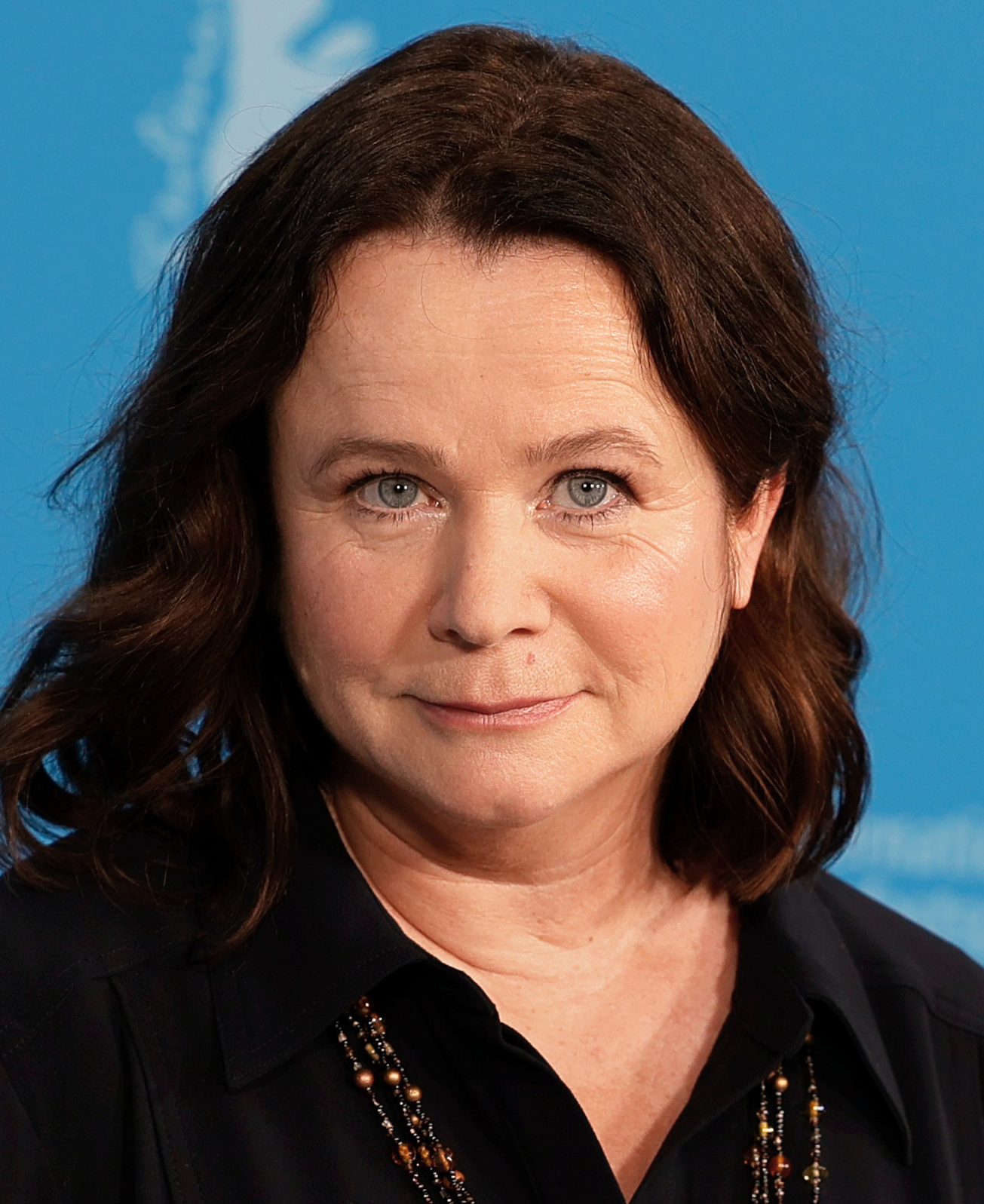
Emily Watson won for Hilary and Jackie (1999).

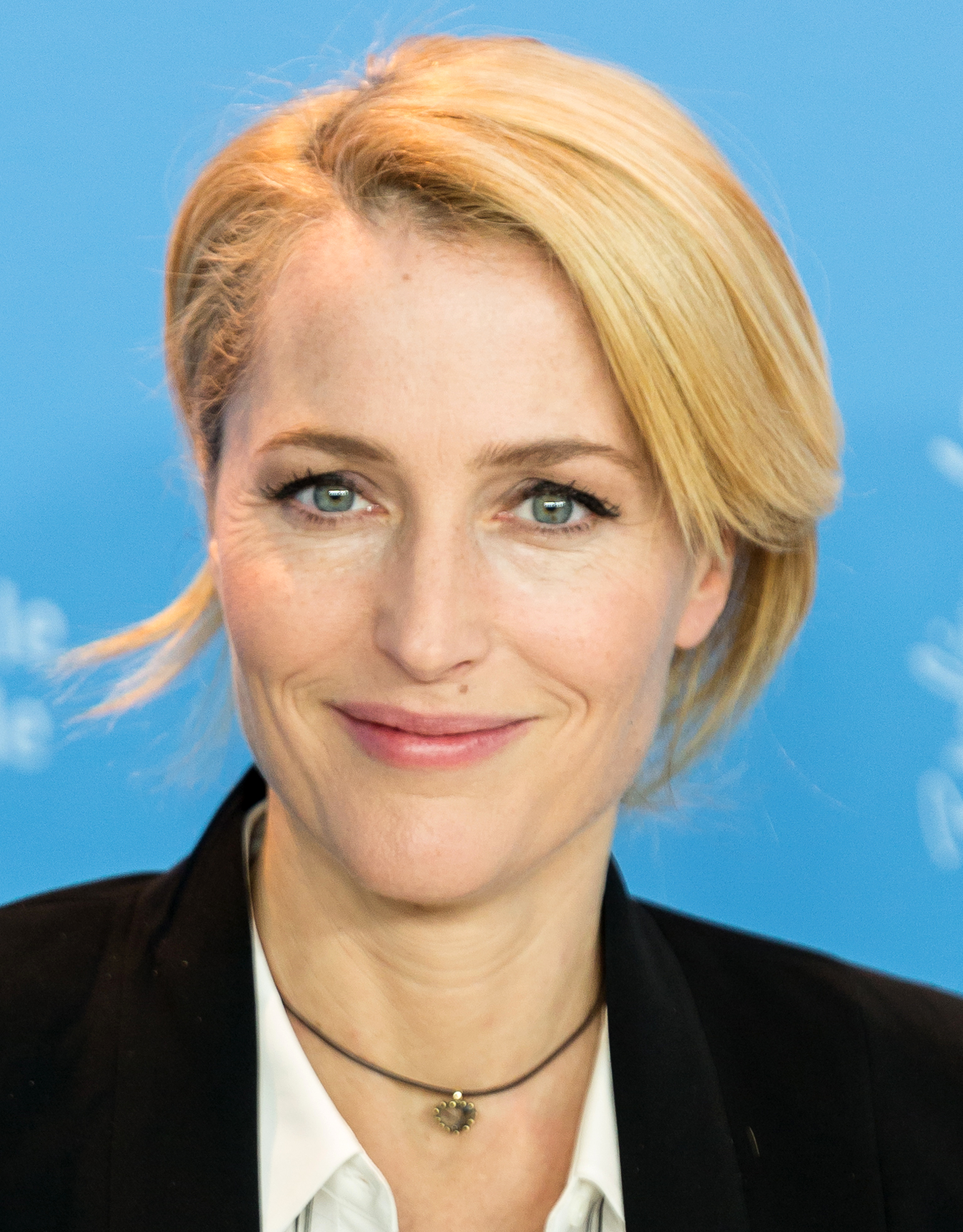
Gillian Anderson won for The House of Mirth (2000).

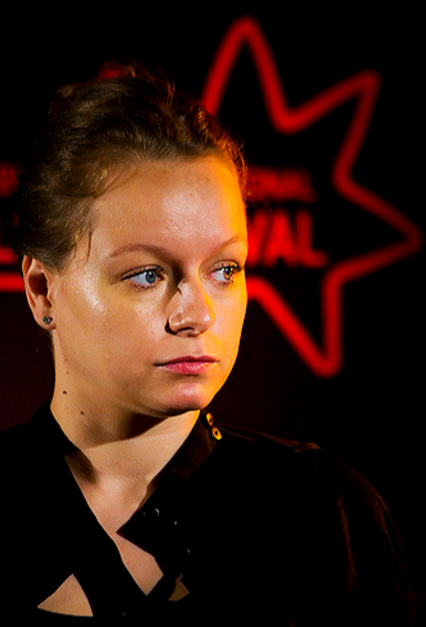
Samantha Morton won for Morvern Callar (2002).

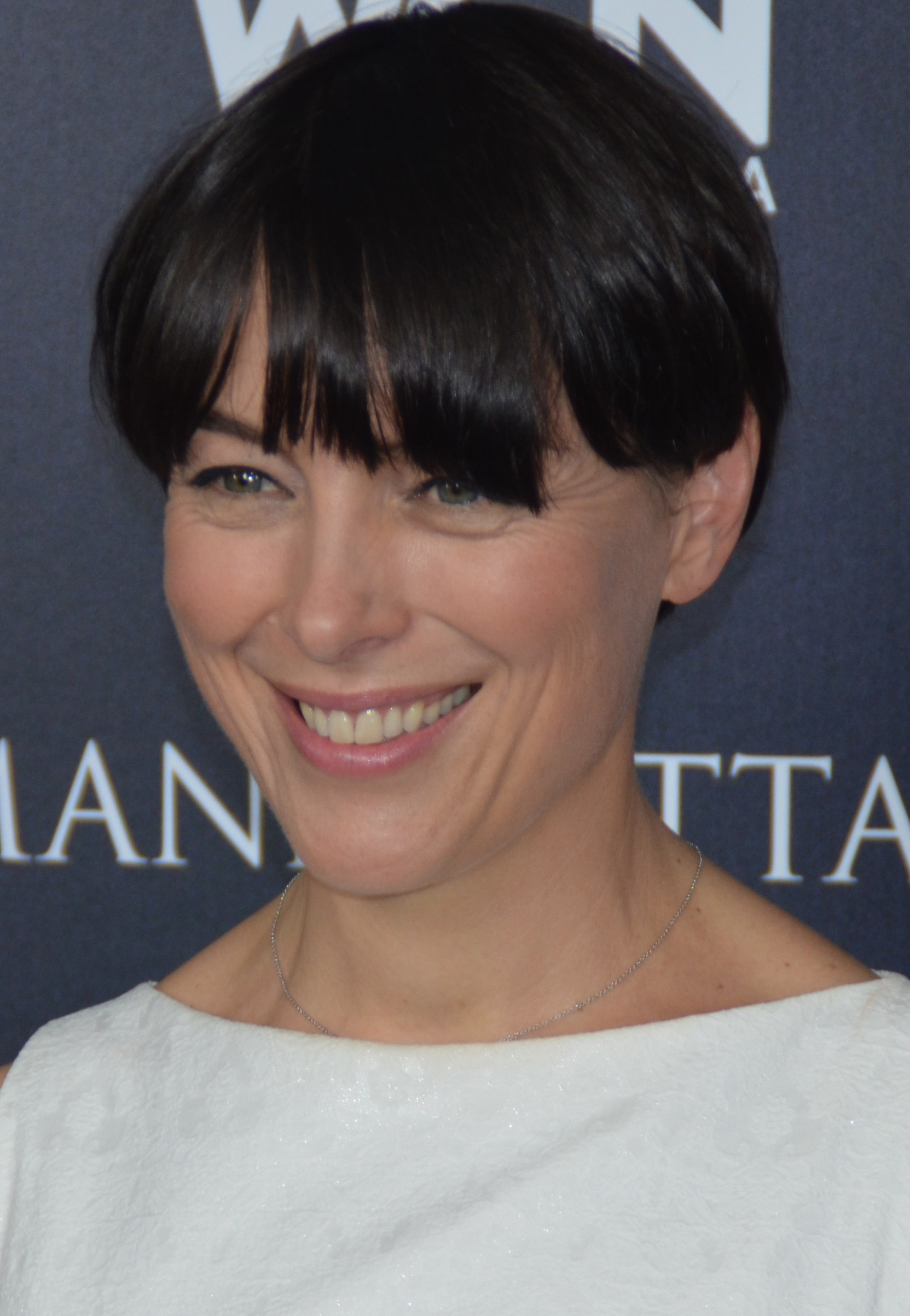
Olivia Williams won for The Heart of Me (2003).

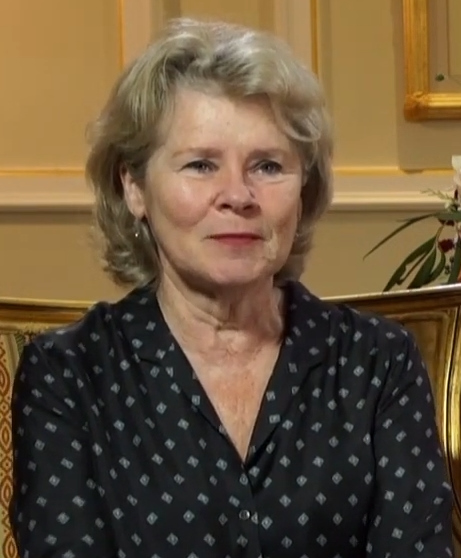
Imelda Staunton won for Vera Drake (2004).

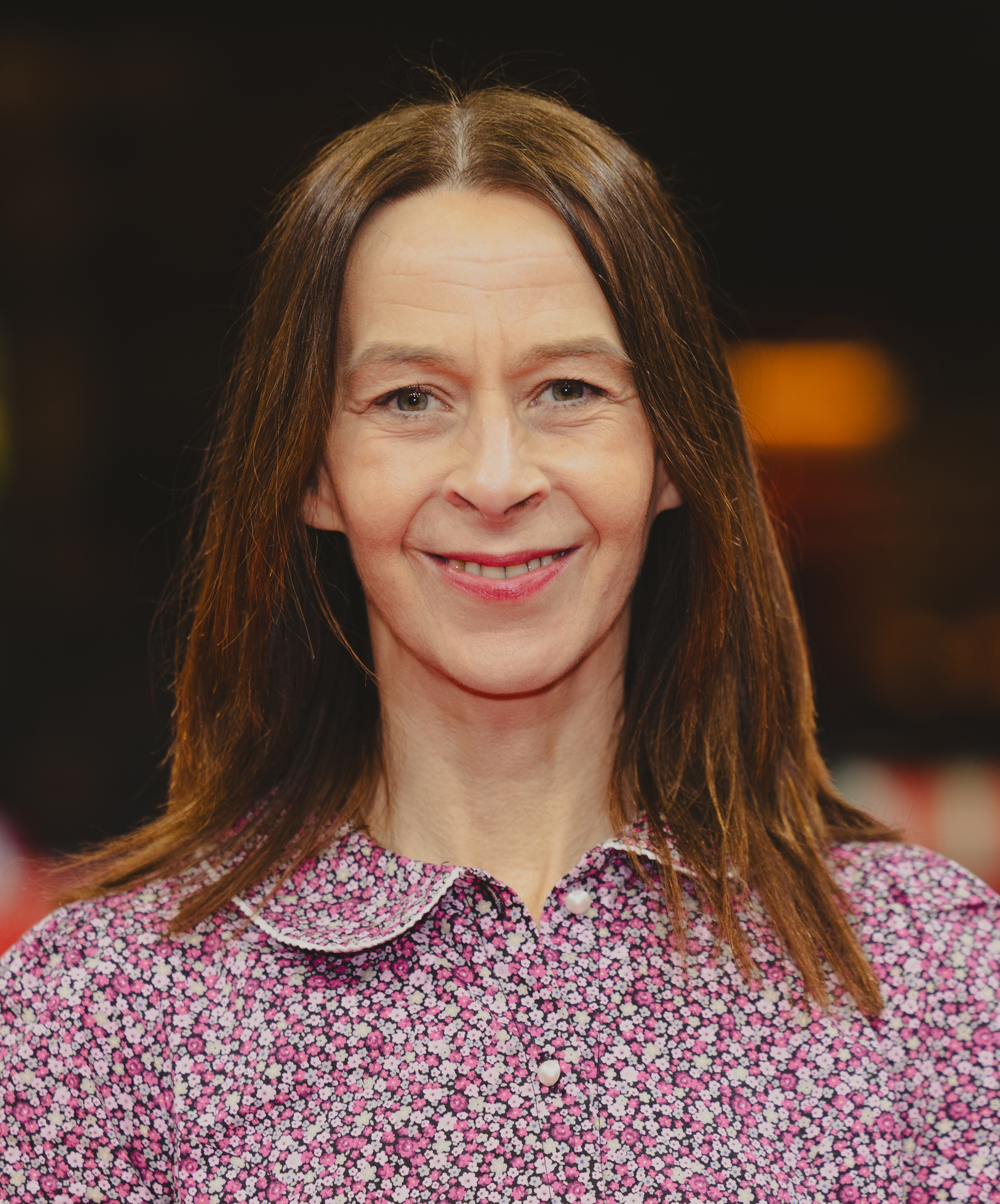
Kate Dickie won for Red Road (2006).

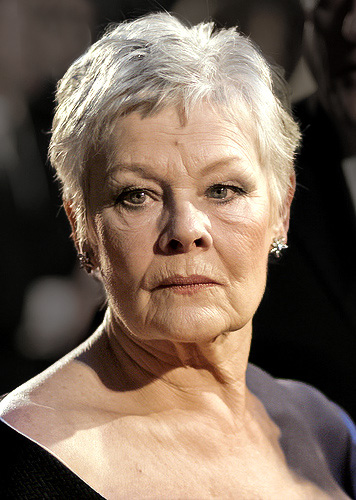
Judi Dench won for Notes on a Scandal (2006).

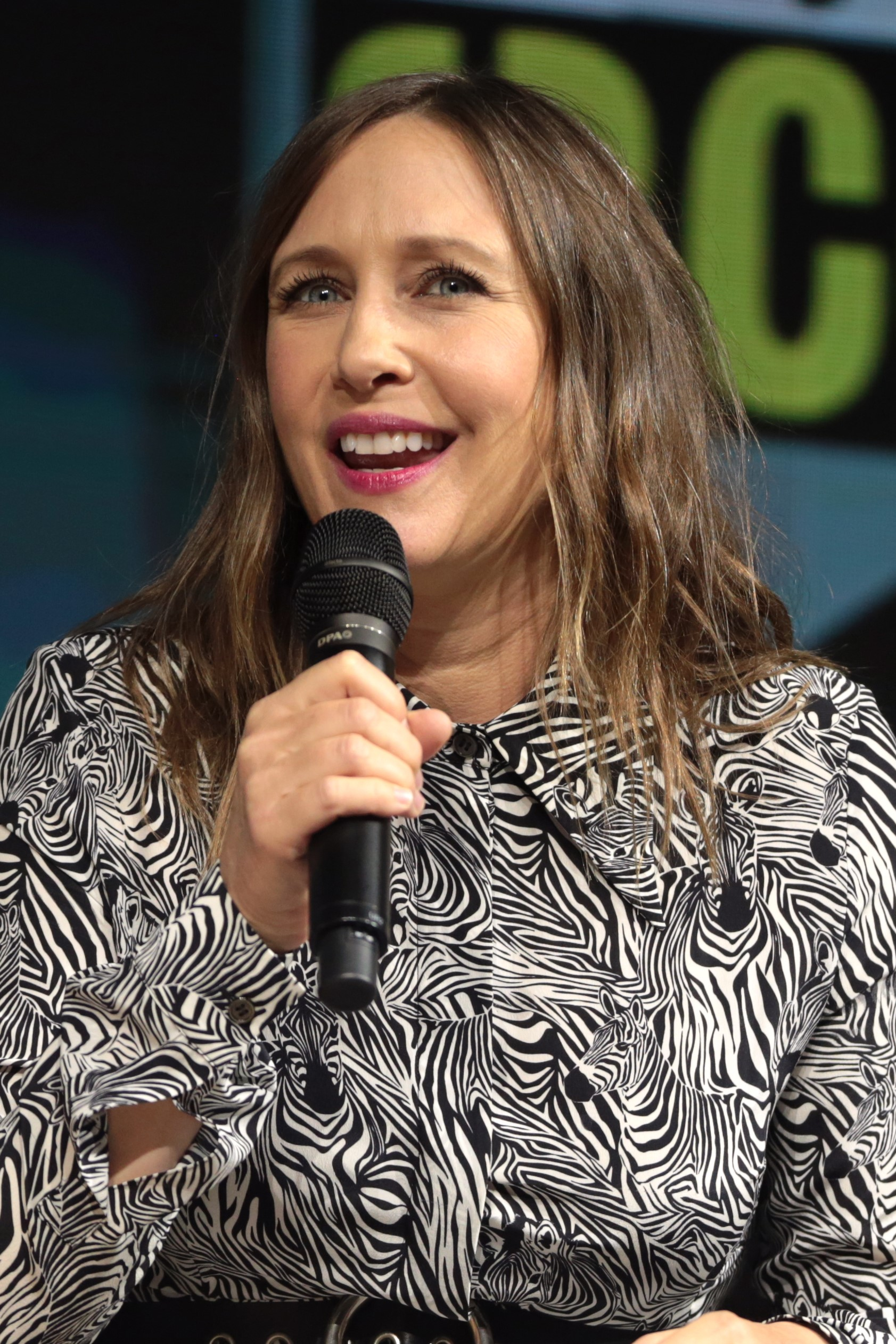
Vera Farmiga won for The Boy in the Striped Pyjamas (2008).

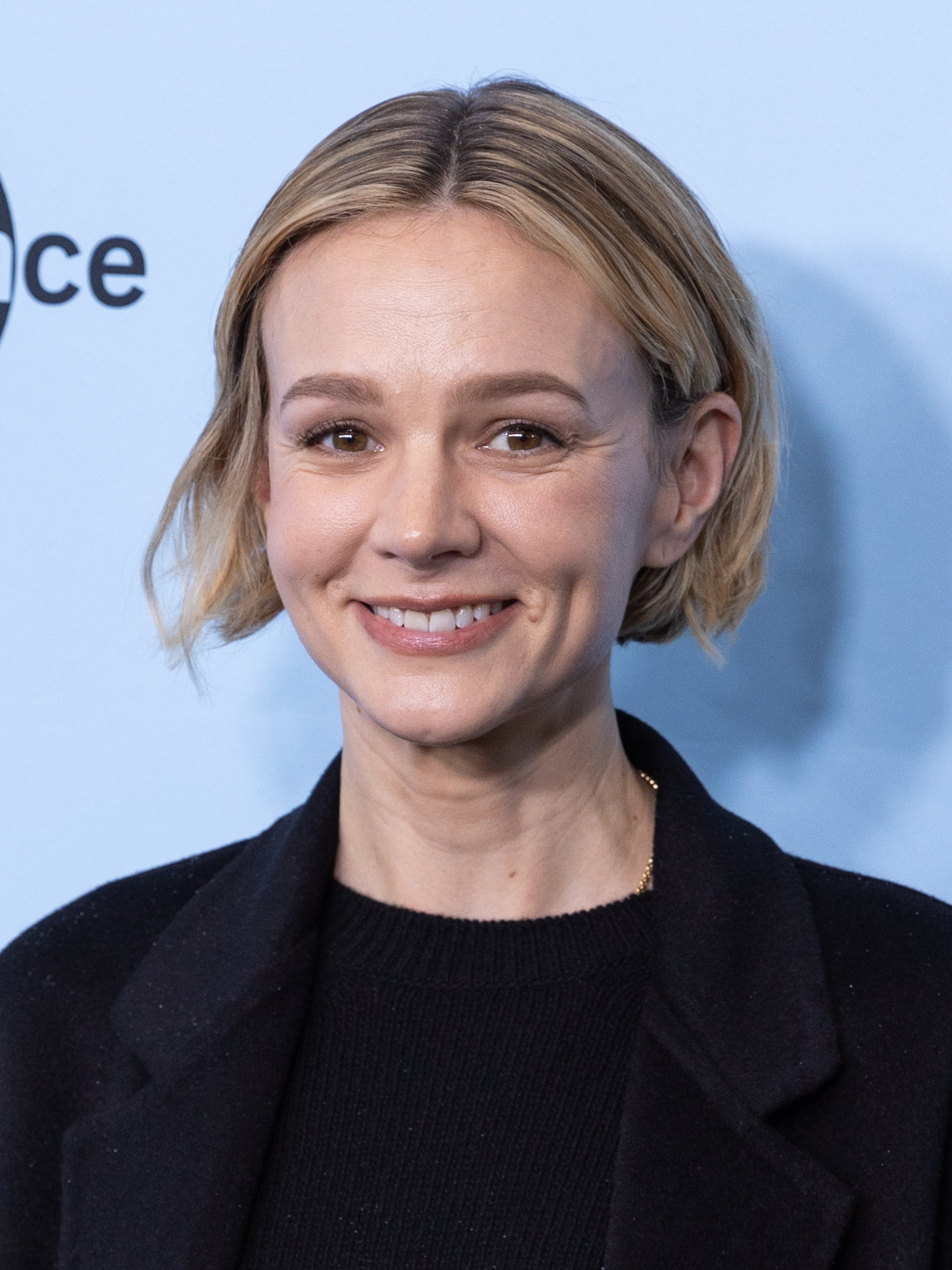
Carey Mulligan has won for An Education (2009) and Never Let Me Go (2010).

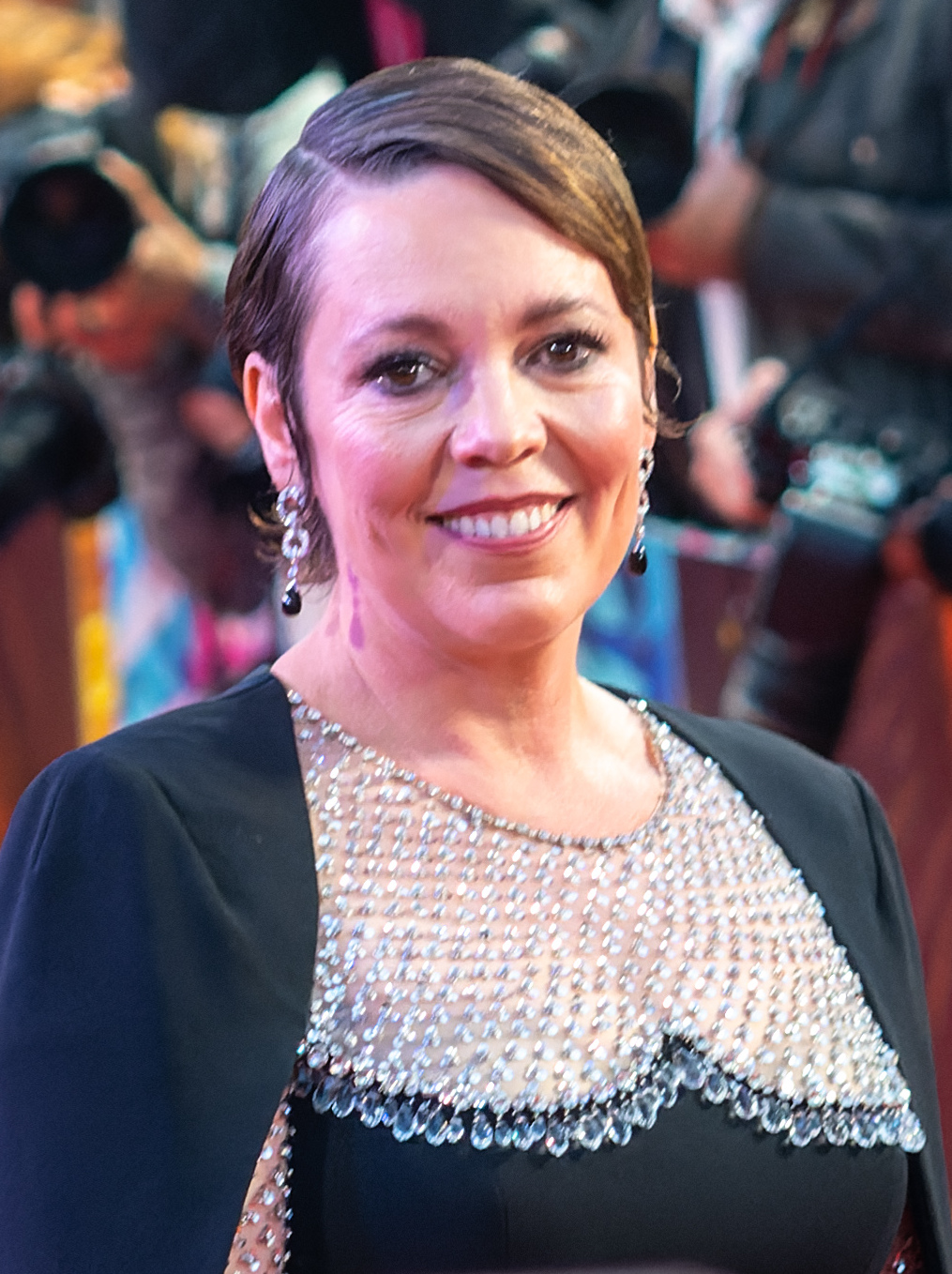
Olivia Colman has won for Tyrannosaur (2011) and The Favourite (2018).

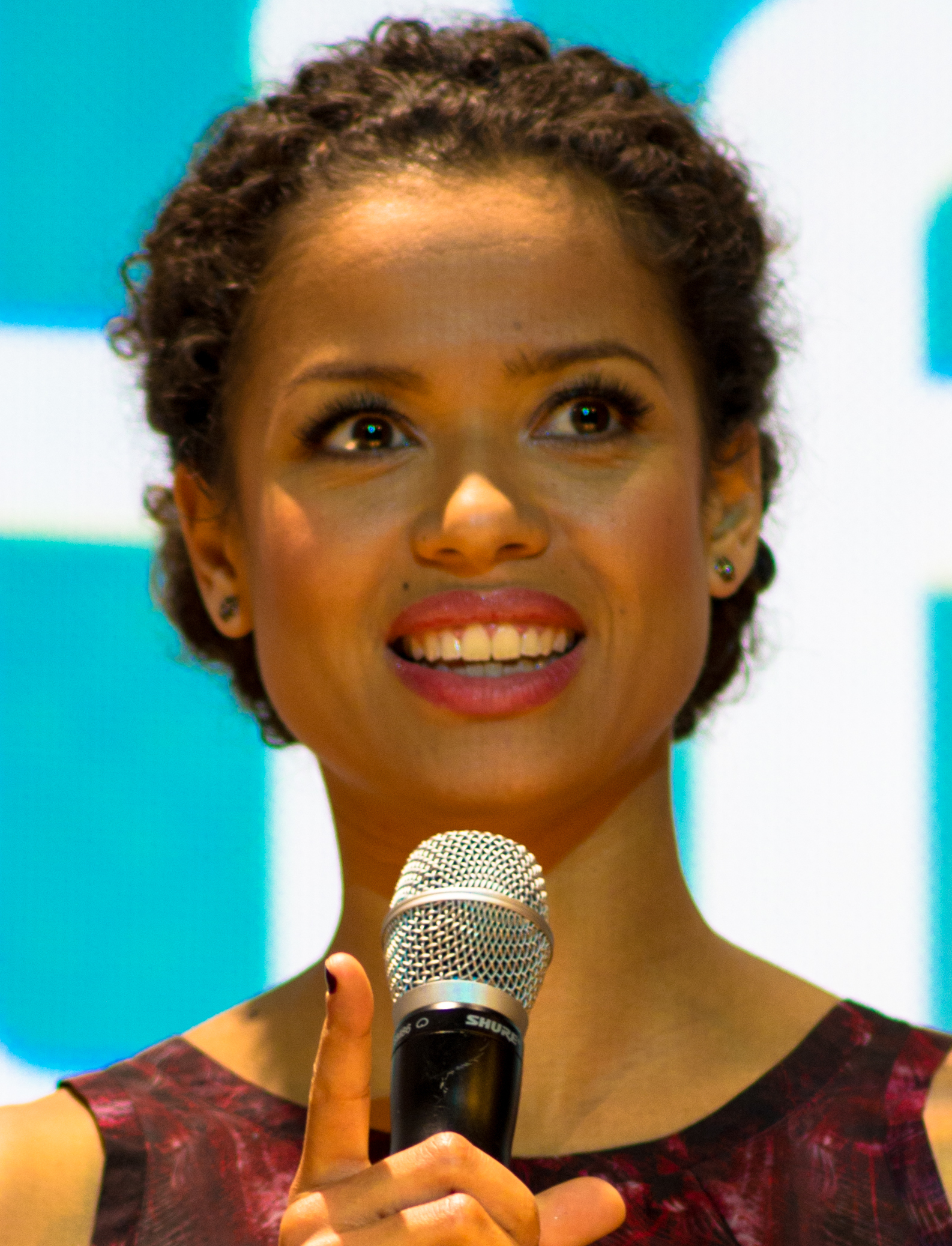
Gugu Mbatha-Raw won for Belle (2014).

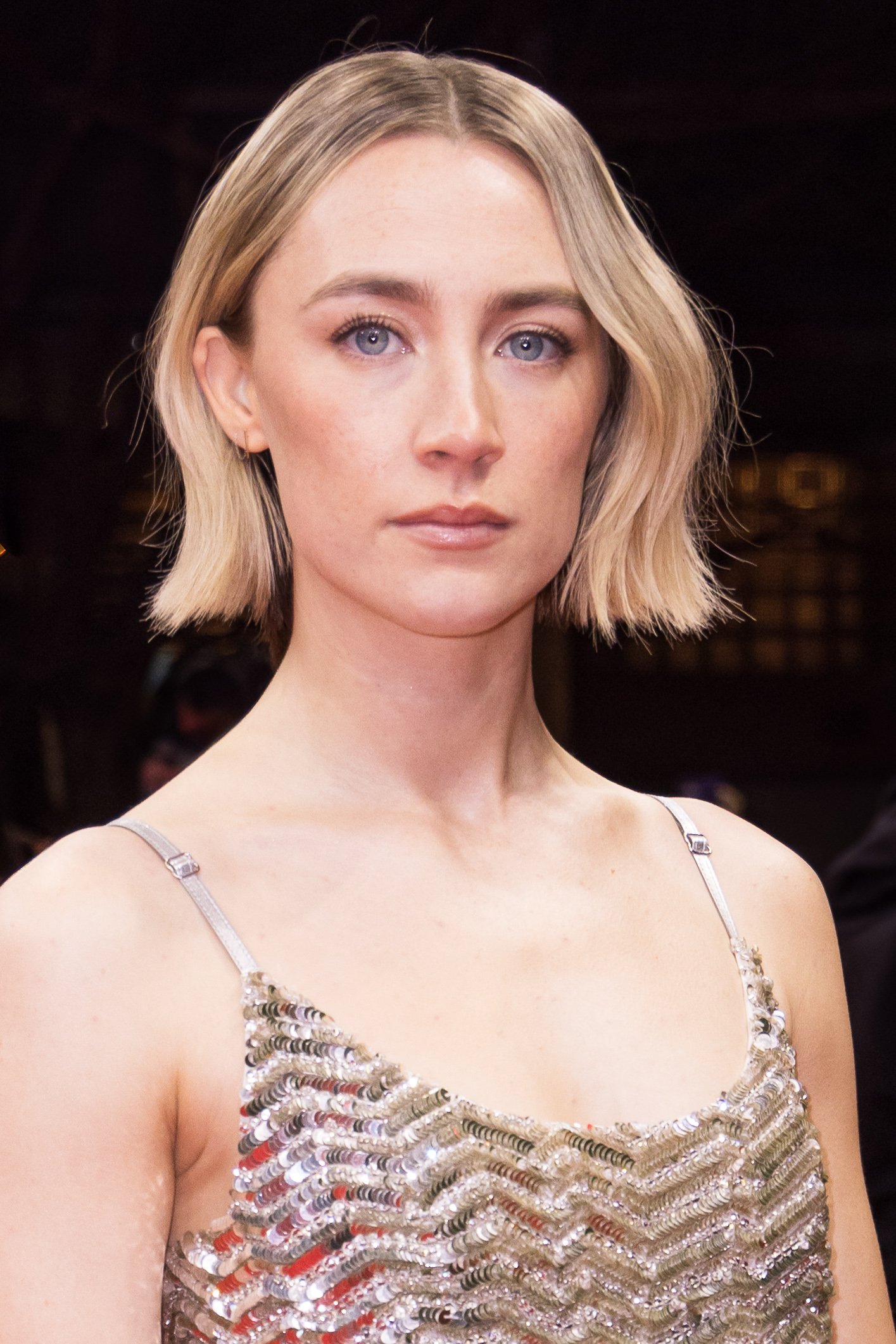
Saoirse Ronan won for Brooklyn (2015).

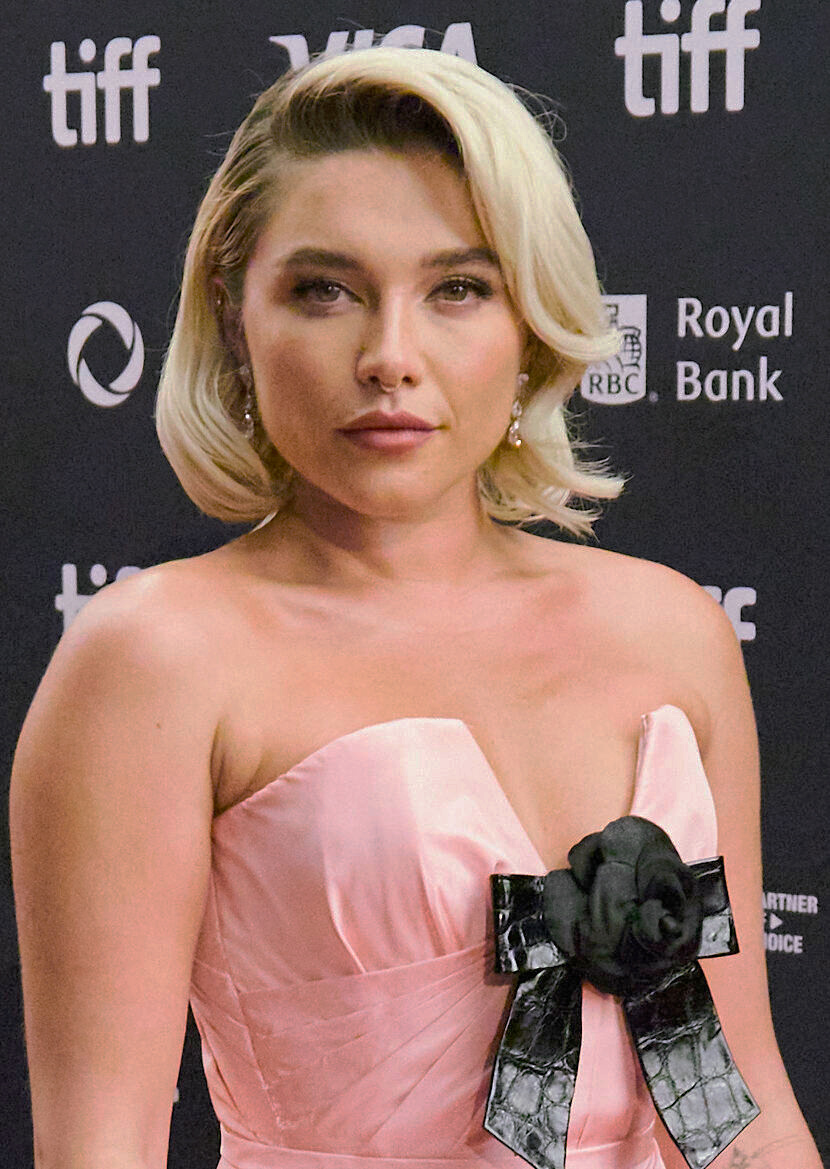
Florence Pugh won for Lady Macbeth (2017).

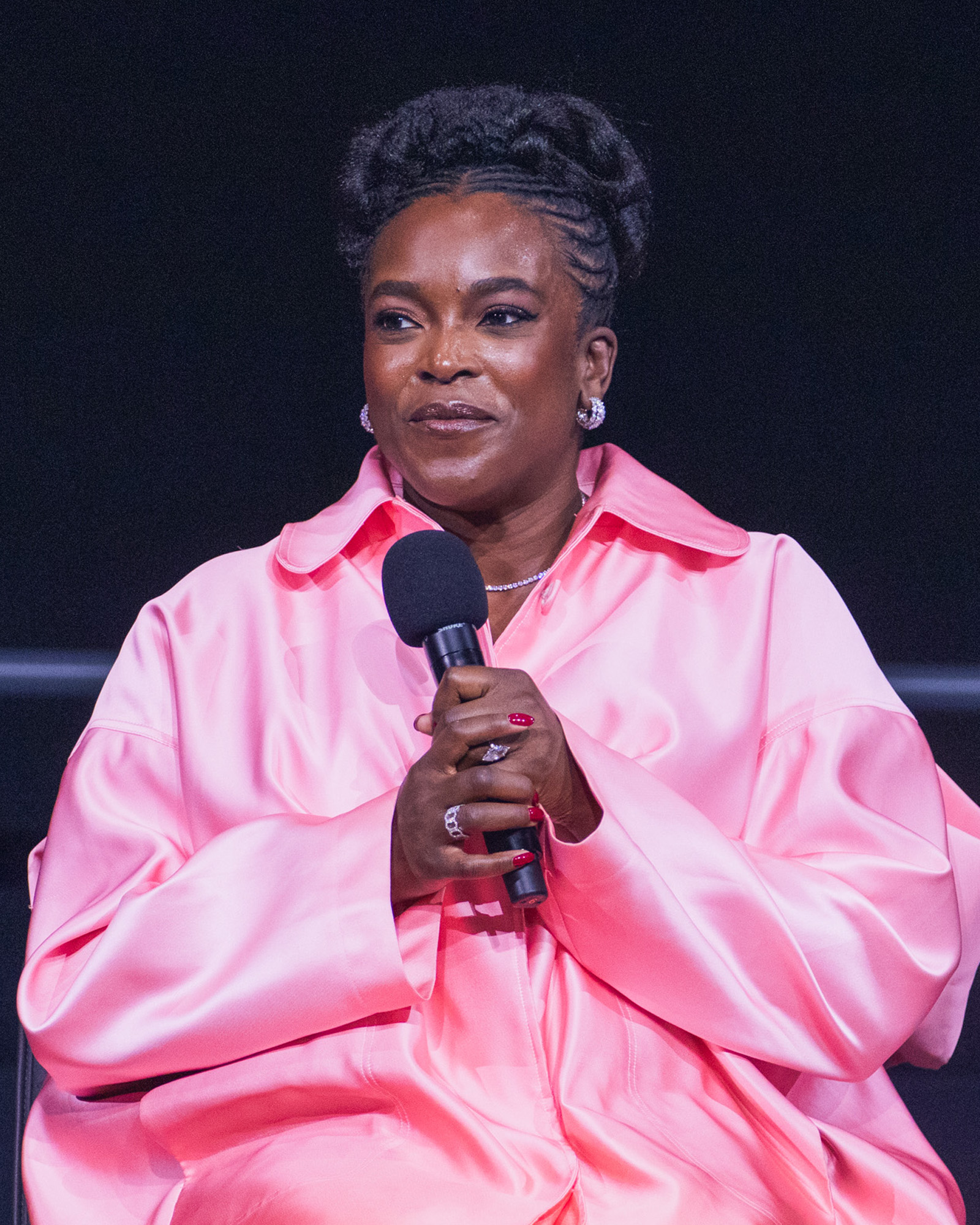
Wunmi Mosaku won for His House (2020).

=== 1990s ===
Year	Actress	Film	Character
1998 (1st)	Kathy Burke	Nil by Mouth	Valerie
1998 (1st)	Louise Goodall	My Name Is Joe	Sarah Downie
1998 (1st)	Rachel Griffiths	My Son the Fanatic	Bettina/ Sandra
1998 (1st)	Samantha Morton	Under the Skin	Iris Kelly
1998 (1st)	Emma Thompson	The Winter Guest	Frances
1999 (2nd)	Emily Watson	Hilary and Jackie	Jacqueline du Pré
1999 (2nd)	Lara Belmont	The War Zone	Jessie
1999 (2nd)	Rachel Griffiths	Hilary and Jackie	Hilary du Pré
1999 (2nd)	Jane Horrocks	Little Voice	LV
1999 (2nd)	Gina McKee	Wonderland	Nadia

=== 2000s ===
Year	Actress	Film	Character
2000 (3rd)	Gillian Anderson	The House of Mirth	Lily Bart
2000 (3rd)	Kate Ashfield	The Low Down	Ruby
2000 (3rd)	Brenda Blethyn	Saving Grace	Grace Trevethyn
2000 (3rd)	Emily Watson	The Luzhin Defence	Natalia Katkov
2001 (4th)	Kate Ashfield	Late Night Shopping	Jody
2001 (4th)	Susan Lynch	Beautiful Creatures	Dorothy
2001 (4th)	Samantha Morton	Pandaemonium	Sara Coleridge
2001 (4th)	Kate Winslet	Enigma	Hester Wallace
2002 (5th)	Samantha Morton	Morvern Callar	Movern Collar
2002 (5th)	Elaine Cassidy	Disco Pigs	Rent/Sinead
2002 (5th)	Shirley Henderson	Villa des Roses	Ella
2002 (5th)	Harriet Walter	Villa des Roses	Olive Burrell
2003 (6th)	Olivia Williams	The Heart of Me	Madeleine
2003 (6th)	Kate Ashfield	This Little Life	Sadie McGregor
2003 (6th)	Helena Bonham Carter	The Heart of Me	Dinah
2003 (6th)	Samantha Morton	In America	Sarah
2003 (6th)	Tilda Swinton	Young Adam	Ella Gault
2004 (7th)	Imelda Staunton	Vera Drake	Vera Drake
2004 (7th)	Eva Birthistle	Ae Fond Kiss...	Roisin Hanlon
2004 (7th)	Scarlett Johansson	Girl with a Pearl Earring	Griet
2004 (7th)	Natalie Press	My Summer of Love	Mona
2004 (7th)	Anne Reid	The Mother	May
2005 (8th)	Rachel Weisz	The Constant Gardener	Tessa Quayle
2005 (8th)	Joan Allen	Yes	She
2005 (8th)	Judi Dench	Mrs Henderson Presents	Mrs. Henderson
2005 (8th)	Natasha Richardson	Asylum	Stella Raphael
2005 (8th)	Emily Watson	Wah-Wah	Ruby Compton
2006 (9th)	Kate Dickie	Red Road	Jackie Morrison
2006 (9th)	Juliette Binoche	Breaking and Entering	Amira Simić
2006 (9th)	Frances de la Tour	The History Boys	Mrs. Lintott
2006 (9th)	Helen Mirren	The Queen	Queen Elizabeth II
2006 (9th)	Robin Wright	Breaking and Entering	Liv
2007 (10th)	Judi Dench	Notes on a Scandal	Barbara Covett
2007 (10th)	Tannishtha Chatterjee	Brick Lane	Nazneen Ahmed
2007 (10th)	Anne Hathaway	Becoming Jane	Jane Austen
2007 (10th)	Sophia Myles	Hallam Foe	Kate Breck
2007 (10th)	Kierston Wareing	It's a Free World...	Angela
2008 (11th)	Vera Farmiga	The Boy in the Striped Pyjamas	Elsa (Mother)
2008 (11th)	Sally Hawkins	Happy-Go-Lucky	Pauline "Poppy" Cross
2008 (11th)	Keira Knightley	The Duchess	Duchess Georgiana
2008 (11th)	Samantha Morton	The Daisy Chain	Martha Conroy
2008 (11th)	Kelly Reilly	Eden Lake	Jenny
2009 (12th)	Carey Mulligan	An Education	Jenny Mellor
2009 (12th)	Emily Blunt	The Young Victoria	Queen Victoria
2009 (12th)	Abbie Cornish	Bright Star	Fanny Brawne
2009 (12th)	Katie Jarvis	Fish Tank	Mia Williams
2009 (12th)	Sophie Okonedo	Skin	Sandra Laing

=== 2010s ===
Year	Actress	Film	Character
2010 (13th)	Carey Mulligan	Never Let Me Go	Kathy H
2010 (13th)	Sally Hawkins	Made in Dagenham	Rita O'Grady
2010 (13th)	Andrea Riseborough	Brighton Rock	Rose
2010 (13th)	Ruth Sheen	Another Year	Gerri Hepple
2010 (13th)	Manjinder Virk	The Arbor	Lorraine Dunbar
2011 (14th)	Olivia Colman	Tyrannosaur	Hannah
2011 (14th)	MyAnna Buring	Kill List	Shel
2011 (14th)	Rebecca Hall	The Awakening	Florence Cathcart
2011 (14th)	Tilda Swinton	We Need to Talk About Kevin	Eva Khatchadourian
2011 (14th)	Mia Wasikowska	Jane Eyre	Jane Eyre
2012 (15th)	Andrea Riseborough	Shadow Dancer	Colette McVeigh
2012 (15th)	Judi Dench	The Best Exotic Marigold Hotel	Evelyn Greenslade
2012 (15th)	Elle Fanning	Ginger & Rosa	Ginger
2012 (15th)	Alice Lowe	Sightseers	Tina
2012 (15th)	Meryl Streep	The Iron Lady	Margaret Thatcher
2013 (16th)	Lindsay Duncan	Le Week-End	Meg Burrows
2013 (16th)	Judi Dench	Philomena	Philomena Lee
2013 (16th)	Scarlett Johansson	Under the Skin	The Alien
2013 (16th)	Felicity Jones	The Invisible Woman	Nelly Ternan
2013 (16th)	Saoirse Ronan	How I Live Now	Daisy
2014 (17th)	Gugu Mbatha-Raw	Belle	Dido Elizabeth Belle
2014 (17th)	Sameena Jabeen Ahmed	Catch Me Daddy	Laila
2014 (17th)	Cheng Pei-pei	Lilting	Junn
2014 (17th)	Keira Knightley	The Imitation Game	Joan Clarke
2014 (17th)	Alicia Vikander	Testament of Youth	Vera Brittain
2015 (18th)	Saoirse Ronan	Brooklyn	Eilis Lacey
2015 (18th)	Marion Cotillard	Macbeth	Lady Macbeth
2015 (18th)	Carey Mulligan	Suffragette	Maud Watts
2015 (18th)	Charlotte Rampling	45 Years	Kate Mercer
2015 (18th)	Alicia Vikander	The Danish Girl	Gerda Wegener
2016 (19th)	Sasha Lane	American Honey	Star
2016 (19th)	Kate Dickie	Couple in a Hole	Karen
2016 (19th)	Narges Rashidi	Under the Shadow	Shideh
2016 (19th)	Hayley Squires	I, Daniel Blake	Katie Morgan
2016 (19th)	Jodie Whittaker	Adult Life Skills	Anna
2017 (20th)	Florence Pugh	Lady Macbeth	Katherine Lester
2017 (20th)	Emily Beecham	Daphne	Daphne
2017 (20th)	Frances McDormand	Three Billboards Outside Ebbing, Missouri	Mildred Hayes
2017 (20th)	Maggie Mulubwa	I Am Not a Witch	Shula
2017 (20th)	Ruth Wilson	Dark River	Alice
2018 (21st)	Olivia Colman	The Favourite	Queen Anne
2018 (21st)	Gemma Arterton	The Escape	Tara
2018 (21st)	Jessie Buckley	Beast	Moll
2018 (21st)	Maxine Peake	Funny Cow	Funny Cow
2018 (21st)	Rachel Weisz	Disobedience	Ronit Krushka
2019 (22nd)	Renée Zellweger	Judy	Judy Garland
2019 (22nd)	Jessie Buckley	Wild Rose	Rose-Lynn Harlan
2019 (22nd)	Holliday Grainger	Animals	Laura
2019 (22nd)	Sally Hawkins	Eternal Beauty	June
2019 (22nd)	Vicky Knight	Dirty God	Jade

=== 2020s ===
Year	Actress	Film	Character
2020 (23rd)	Wunmi Mosaku	His House	Rial
2020 (23rd)	Bukky Bakray	Rocks	Olushola "Rocks" Omotoso
2020 (23rd)	Morfydd Clark	Saint Maud	Maud
2020 (23rd)	Claire Dunne	Her Self	Sandra
2020 (23rd)	Andrea Riseborough	Luxor	Hana
2021 (24th)	Joanna Scanlan	After Love	Mary
2021 (24th)	Caitríona Balfe	Belfast	Ma
2021 (24th)	Carrie Coon	The Nest	Allison O'Hara
2021 (24th)	Claire Rushbrook	Ali & Ava	Ava
2021 (24th)	Ruth Wilson	True Things	Kate

== Multiple nominations ==
5 nominations

- Samantha Morton

4 nominations

- Judi Dench

3 nominations

- Kate Ashfield
- Sally Hawkins
- Carey Mulligan
- Andrea Riseborough
- Emily Watson

2 nominations

- Jessie Buckley
- Olivia Colman
- Rachel Griffiths
- Scarlett Johansson
- Keira Knightley
- Saoirse Ronan
- Tilda Swinton
- Alicia Vikander
- Rachel Weisz

== Multiple wins ==
2 wins

- Olivia Colman
- Carey Mulligan (consecutive)

== See also ==
- Academy Award for Best Actress
- BAFTA Award for Best Actress in a Leading Role
- Critics' Choice Movie Award for Best Actress
- Golden Globe Award for Best Actress in a Motion Picture – Drama
- Golden Globe Award for Best Actress – Motion Picture Comedy or Musical
- Screen Actors Guild Award for Outstanding Performance by a Female Actor in a Leading Role
