= Wedding Belles =

2007 British television film

- DVD Cover
- Created by: Dean Cavanagh (screenplay); Irvine Welsh
- Directed by: Philip John
- Starring: Michelle Gomez; Shirley Henderson; Shauna Macdonald

Original release
- Network: Channel 4
- Release: 29 March 2007

Wedding Belles is a Scottish-based British television drama film first broadcast on Channel 4 on 29 March 2007.

== Plot ==
Wedding Belles centres around four young women struggling with personal issues, while preparing to throw one of their group the wedding of the year. As the wedding draws nearer, a series of revelations turn their lives into turmoil, and the impending celebration turns into hysterical carnage.

Amanda is the bride-to-be and the matriarch of the group. She is a successful business woman running her own beauty salon. She is set to marry an airline pilot, Joshua. He appears to be too good to be true and, unknown to Amanda, is indeed hiding a dark secret.

Kelly is a troubled soul who, while battling personal demons, upsets all those around her and starts to lose her hair from her stress.

Rhona is an ex-fashion model, who is not coping well with the untimely death of her fiancé. She slips deeper into depression and, through the haze of her furthering drug addiction, decides to seek revenge on her fiancé's killer.

Shaz works as a nurse in an old people's home, who almost gets into trouble for selling Viagra to the residents, while having an affair with the local Catholic priest, Father Henry.

== Cast ==
- Amanda - Michelle Gomez
- Kelly - Shirley Henderson
- Rhona - Shauna Macdonald
- Shaz - Kathleen McDermott
- Father Henry - Brendan Coyle
- Barney - Michael Fassbender
- Joshua - Jonathan Lewis Owen
- Gaz - Daniel Healy
