= Ruth McCance =

Northern Irish film writer and producer (died 2023)

- Born: 1969; Belfast, Northern Ireland
- Died: 18 December 2023 (aged 53–54); Stockholm, Sweden
- Education: University of Glasgow
- Occupations: Screenwriter, executive producer
- Employer: Warp Films
- Known for: Screenwriting
- Notable work: Little Birds (TV series)
- Spouse: Kalle Torring (divorced 2005)
- Partner: Lars Nilsson
- Children: 2

Ruth Torring McCance (1969 – 2023) was a Northern Irish screenwriter and executive producer based in Stockholm. She was known for her work on the television series Little Birds.

== Biography ==
McCance was born in Belfast to Hazel Gorden and Bert McCance. She grew up working class in Belfast, attending Friends' School, Lisburn. McCance graduated with a degree in film and media studies from the University of Glasgow. Later she worked at BBC Scotland, where her writing was discovered, working as a secretary to Andrea Calderwood. Lynne Ramsay credited McCance for allowing her the opportunity to create her film Ratcatcher. She later became a script editor and producer at Ruby Films.

In the early 2000s, she moved to Copenhagen and London to work for Potboiler Productions. In 2011, she moved to Stockholm working on script rights and production management. She later joined Warp Films, commuting between the UK and Stockholm.

McCance was known for her executive production and writing on Little Birds, a six part limited series about a woman finding her freedom in Tangier in 1955. The series was commissioned by Sky, and was later nominated for a BAFTA Television Craft Award.

In 2021 at Warp Films, McCance wrote a punk adaptation of Honoré de Balzac’s novel Illusions perdues for television.

McCance died of stomach cancer in December 2023 at age 53. At the time of her death, she had written a pilot script and outlined six episodes of a climate thriller series, "S.O.L.". After her death, Simon Beaufoy came on board to finish writing the series. The series would later be spotlighted at the Berlinale Series Market in 2024.

== Film productions ==
- 1999, Ratcatcher
- 1999, The Darkest Light
- 2003, It's All About Love
- 2003, Skagerrak
- 2007, Son of Rambow
