= Kathleen McDermott =

Scottish actress (born 1977)

Kathleen McDermott Carberry
- Born: 21 May 1977 (age 48); Glasgow, Scotland
- Other names: Kathleen McDermott Carberry; Kathleen Carberry
- Occupations: Actress; Singer; Model; Make-up artist
- Spouse: Martin Carberry
- Children: 2
- Website: kathleenmcdermott.com

Kathleen McDermott (born 21 May 1977) is a Scottish actress, singer, model, and make-up artist. She is best known for her roles in the feature film Morvern Callar (2002), the television film Wedding Belles (2007), and the miniseries Dead Set (2008).

== Biography ==
McDermott is an experienced vocalist, who also enjoys martial arts and snowboarding. She was working as a hairdresser when spotted by the casting director for Morvern Callar. She is best known for her appearance as Shaz in Wedding Belles and Pippa in E4's 2008 series Dead Set. In 2009, she played Debbi in the Scottish sitcom Happy Hollidays. She also played many characters in The Celtic story at the Armidilo in Glasgow. She has 2 children and is currently married to Martin Carberry (m.2008).

She appeared in the music video "Books from Boxes" by Maxïmo Park.

== Filmography ==
- 2002: Morvern Callar as Lanna
- 2002: Taggart (Series 19): "Blood Money" as Caroline Taylor
- 2003: Out of the Cold as a school teacher
- 2004: Baldy McBain as Teacher
- 2004: Squaddie as Michelle
- 2005: Milk as Jennifer
- 2006: Nina's Heavenly Delights as Janice Shah
- 2007: Wedding Belles as Shaz
- 2007: Casualty: "Seize The Day" as Lowri Dart
- 2008: Dead Set as Pippa
- 2008: Rab C. Nesbitt: "Christmas Special" as Lorna Nesbitt
- 2009: Casualty: "Before A Fall" as Tanya
- 2009: Happy Hollidays as Debbi
- 2012: New Tricks as Charley
- 2015: The Syndicate as Journalist, Three Episodes
