= Ngozi Onwurah =

Nigerian film director (born 1966)

- Born: 1966 (age 59–60); Nigeria
- Education: Film – St. Martin's School of Art, The National Film (UK), The Television School (UK)
- Occupations: Director, Producer, Model, Lecturer
- Spouse: Alwin H. Küchler
- Children: 1 daughter

Ngozi Onwurah (born 1966) is a British-Nigerian film director, producer, model, and lecturer. She is best known as a filmmaker for her autobiographical film The Body Beautiful (1991) and her first feature film, Welcome II the Terrordome (1994). Her work is reflective of the unfiltered experiences of Black Diaspora in which she was raised.

== Early life and education ==
Ngozi Onwurah was born in the year 1966 in Nigeria to a Nigerian father, and a white British mother, Madge Onwurah. She has two siblings, Simon Onwurah and Labour MP Chi Onwurah. As children, Onwurah's mother was forced to flee with her children from Nigeria in order to escape the Nigerian Civil War. They fled to England, where Ngozi and Simon spent the majority of their childhood. Growing up in a predominantly white neighborhood, Onwurah and her brother endured social abuse and racism, stemming from their biracial identity and father's absence.

Onwurah began her studies in film at St. Martin's School of Art in London. She eventually completed a 3-year study and graduated as a director from the UK's National Film and Television School in Beaconsfield, England.

== Personal life ==
Ngozi is married to cinematographer Alwin H. Küchler, and they have one daughter together.

== Films ==
=== Coffee Colored Children (1988) ===
This film was a performative, autobiographical, experimental, and ethnographic piece that explores the inner feelings of growing up in a mixed race household. The film shows mixed race children experiencing racial harassment and isolation as a result of their skin tones. Two children, one boy and one girl, are featured in the film and shown powdering their faces with white cleaning solution and scrubbing their skin raw in order to rid themselves of the self-hatred they feel as a result of their dark skin tones. The film shows such stereotypes as the "Tragic Mulatto", but challenges this by featuring Ngozi and her brother Simon Onwurah being exceptions to the stereotype. Coffee Colored Children addresses the idea of a "melting pot" society and challenges it by suggesting that it should be called the "incinerator".

=== And Still I Rise (1991) ===
This film was inspired by a poem by director, Dr. Maya Angelou. The film examines ethnographic images of Black Women featured in documentary works. Onwurah interviews many different women with different stories, occupations, and struggles in the film. One woman, Caron Wheeler is a singer and songwriter. She discusses her traumatic past experiences; including rape, experienced by both herself and her ancestors. And Still I Rise explores the historical roots of African ancestry during slavery. In one scene, she shows the image of a Black woman, naked and bound, accompanied by the sound of a whip. She uses controversial images and stories to display the lack of control Black women had over their bodies at this time and how that is still present in Black culture today all across the world, especially in Third World African countries. She shows how women were treated in the past, during slavery, and in the present, with the intention of changing the future.

=== The Body Beautiful (1991) ===
This film is an autobiographical piece featuring actress Sian Martin (now Ejiwunmi-Le Berre) as Ngozi, and Ngozi's mother, Madge Onwurah. Both women narrate certain portions of the film. The Body Beautiful discusses both women, and their lives and fears. Madge Onwurah speaks of marrying a Nigerian man, bearing mixed race children, and having breast cancer followed by a mastectomy. The film also explore Ngozi's feelings of being raised by a white British mother, being a model in a predominantly white industry, and the deep inner workings of her relationship with her mother and her mother's sexuality. Ngozi admits that for a while she never saw her mother as a sexual being. In the film, she re-sexualizes her mother by envisioning her making love to a young Black man. In another scene, Ngozi and her mother lay naked together, and the scar of Madge's mastectomy scar is exposed. This image is controversial because of the ideals of what is considered beautiful in Western Society. This scene is a symbol of embracing the body in its truest form, and truest identity.

Visual With multiple jumpcuts, the cinematography consists primarily of panning shots, medium shots (especially the faces of Madge, Ngozi, and the photographer), and close-up shots. The camera is never hand-held or deliberately shaky, and seems to be positioned on a tripod or mount at all times. This decision to place the viewer so "close" to the characters on screen allows access greater intimacy with the events and emotions of the film. In this way, the film strives to "push" the audience beyond the normal comfort level. Examples of this intimacy are two close-up shots in the erotic scene: one of the black hand running slowly across Madge's back, and the other of Madge's wrinkled scar on her chest as the black hand pauses right above it, hesitating to place itself directly upon her skin. The deliberate implementation and overlaying of these sounds, music, and narration, combine with the visual stylistic choices to create an overall sensual experience.

=== Monday's Girls (1993) ===
This film is an ethnographic documentary showcasing the lives of two Nigerian women. The women take place in a cultural ceremony in which young virgins, as the two girls are, live in a "fattening room" for five weeks. When they come out they are celebrated and respected by their community. The film shows two different points of views on this issue. On one hand, there is Florence, who is honored to be part of the ceremony. On the other hand, there is Asikiye, who is a more westernized girl against the ceremony. This film explores the Third World African woman and discusses conflicting cultural ideologies. Actress Caroline Lee-Johnson is the film's narrator.

=== Welcome II the Terrordome (1994) ===
This political action thriller was the first independent Black British feature film to be released. The film was premiered at the Sundance Film Festival as Ngozi was in the United States during a promotional visit for the film. In the film, Ngozi retells Black history as it would be if it took place in "the future of a grim dystopic science fiction landscape". She draws on historical images of Black men and women, and focuses on the body. In the film, the Black body is displayed as a "site of commodification, sterilization, and culturally approved genocide". She displays issues of drug abuse, racism, and poverty.

=== The Desired Number (1995) ===
Also called A Question of Numbers. This film is based on the Iwollo Village in Nigeria where women typically bear nine children. The film discusses the issue of birth control usage among Nigerian women, mainly how it is rarely used. As in Ngozi's film Monday's Girls, the "Third World" African woman is explored. In this film, Ngozi is showing that these women do have control over their bodies because they have the option of going to a clinic and obtaining birth control or not. However, the cultural standards of birthing many children still stand in their way of being totally in control of their own bodies.

== Style and genre ==
Onwurah used autobiographical elements, cultural memory, multiple narrators, ethnographic and experimental elements in many of her works. Film scholar Gwendolyn Audrey Foster has stated that Onwurah's work includes the practice of "image-making" through memory that plays with how traditional narratives are created in film. Foster also argues that Onwurah's work exists within Bill Nichols terms "the blurred border zones of realism". Foster also argues that Onwurah's work is "a thinking and feeling cinema, a wedding of formalism and realism and something irreducibly and excessively corporeal and hyperreal".

Foster further states that Onwurah challenges the concepts of time and space and embraces multiple sites of subjectivity. She also feels that Onwurah replaces the traditional psychoanalytical approach in film theory with phenomelogical, therefore she focuses heavily on the body as much as the mind. Specifically, most of Onwurah's work is centered around the human, and often female, body. Foster's research also says that Onwurah's film-making utilizes the human body in ways that contrast traditional ethnographic film-making that limits other forms of knowledge on bodies. The body, in Onwurah's work according to Foster, is created through a duality. The body is both a representation of colonial violence as well as a tool for agency in Onwurah's films.

Scholar Julian Stringer has opined that Onwurah's film-making also poses complex questions surrounding identity politics, a convention in other forms of black cinema. He feels that she possesses an "inter-cultural concern" with racial identities and how they fit within larger global contexts and further writes that Onwurah's film-making is a confrontation of historical racial structures that continue to affect the modern-day. Onwurah stated in an interview that she wishes to address the trauma black women have faced historically by "spelling it out" in her film-making. Other scholars have noted that questions of the relation between racialization and intimacy are also included in Onwurah's films and that most of Onwurah's work deals with how ethnographic cinema is limited by colonial discourse, as well as challenge Western notions of the sexist and 'savage African as well.

== Other film work ==
- Best Wishes (1989)
- Fruits of Fear (1990)
- Who Stole the Soul (1992)
- Flight of the Swan (1993)
- Siren Spirits (1994)
- White Men Are Cracking Up (1996)
- Behind the Mask (1997)
- Hang Time (2001)
- Mama Africa (2002)
- Shoot The Messenger (2006)
- Neighborhood Alert (2024)

== Television ==
- Series: South of the Border (1988)
- Mini-Series: Heartbeat (1995)
- Mini-Series: Siren Spirits (1995)
- Mini-Series: Crucial Tales (1996)

== Awards and nominations ==
• Coffee Colored Children (1988)

- Winner – Short Feature Category, BBC, UK.
- Prized Pieces Award Winner – National Black Programming Consortium, US.
- Golden Gate Award Winner – San Francisco Film Festival, US.
- Films de Femmes – Creteil, France.
- Nominee – Best Short Film – Torino International Festival of Young Cinema
- Gold Hugo Nominee – Best Short Film – Chicago International Film Festival

• Best Wishes (1989)

- Gold Hugo Nominee – Best Short Film – Chicago International Film Festival

• The Body Beautiful (1991)

- Winner – Best Short Film – Melbourne Film Festival, Australia.
- Winner – Best Documentary – Montreal Film Festival, Canada.

• Who Stole the Soul? (1992)

- Royal Television Society Award Winner – Best Adult Continuing – UK

• Flight of the Swan (1993)

- Gold Hugo Winner – Best Short Film – Chicago International Film Festival

• Welcome II the Terrordome (1994)

- Audience Award Winner – Verona Love Screens Film Festival

• Shoot The Messenger (2006)

- Prix Italia Winner – Best TV Drama
- Jury Award Nominee – Best Narrative Feature – Tribeca Film Festival

== Filmography ==
Film

| Year | Title | Director |
|---|---|---|
| 1988 | Coffee Colored Children | Yes |
| 1989 | Best Wishes | Yes |
| 1990 | Fruits of Feer | Yes |
| 1991 | And Still I Rise | Yes |
| 1991 | The Body Beautiful | Yes |
| 1992 | Who Stole the Soul? | Yes |
| 1993 | Monday's Girls | Yes |
| 1993 | Flight of the Swan | Yes |
| 1994 | Welcome II the Terrordome | Yes |
| 1995 | The Desired Number | Yes |
| 1996 | White Men Are Cracking Up | Yes |
| 1997 | Behind the Mask | Yes |
| 2001 | Hang Time | Yes |
| 2002 | Mama Africa | Yes |
| 2006 | Shoot the Messenger | Yes |
| 2024 | Neighborhood Alert | Yes |

Television

| Year | Title | Director | Notes |
|---|---|---|---|
| 1988 | South of the Border | Yes | Series |
| 1994 | Siren Spirits | Yes (2 episodes) | Mini-Series |
| 1995 | Heartbeat | Yes (1 episode) | Mini-Series |
| 1996 | Crucial Tales | Yes (1 episode) | Mini-Series |

== Legacy ==
According to Foster, Onwurah has pushed the limits of the "representative Black Woman" and rebels against the stereotypical assumption of what a Black female filmmaker represents. Stringer argues that Onwurah has become an example of how diverse Black female film-making can be.

Onwurah is also the first Black British woman whose feature film was released theatrically in the United Kingdom. Onwurah has promoted a type of film-making that "blurs fiction with fact" and "documentary with narrative", all while critiquing and analysing the colonial damage that has been wrecked on the black diaspora. Foster also argues that she has created new boundaries of space in cinema carved for the body as a point of subjectivity.

Her work is being used as educational material for aspiring film-makers. She was invited by members of the Indiana University's Black Film Center/Archive to travel to Bloomington to discuss her work with the students attending the university.
