= Wonderland (1999 film) =

- Theatrical release poster
- Directed by: Michael Winterbottom
- Written by: Laurence Coriat
- Produced by: Michele Camarda; Gina Carter; Andrew Eaton
- Starring: Ian Hart; Shirley Henderson; Kika Markham; Gina McKee; Molly Parker; Jack Shepherd; John Simm; Stuart Townsend; Enzo Cilenti; Sarah-Jane Potts
- Cinematography: Sean Bobbitt
- Edited by: Trevor Waite
- Music by: Michael Nyman
- Production companies: Revolution Films; Kismet Film Company
- Distributed by: Universal Pictures International (through United International Pictures)
- Release dates: 13 May 1999 (Cannes); 14 January 2000 (United Kingdom)
- Running time: 108 minutes
- Country: United Kingdom
- Language: English

Wonderland is a 1999 British drama film directed by Michael Winterbottom. The film stars Ian Hart, Shirley Henderson, Kika Markham, Gina McKee, Molly Parker, Jack Shepherd, John Simm, Stuart Townsend, Enzo Cilenti, and Sarah-Jane Potts.

Wonderland had its world premiere at the 1999 Cannes Film Festival on 13 May 1999, and was released in the United Kingdom on 14 January 2000, by Universal Pictures.

== Plot summary ==
The film follows the lives of three London sisters and their family over five days, a long Guy Fawkes Night weekend in November. Waitress Nadia, "shy, with a backpack and her hair in girlish twists", spends all her time going on blind dates with unsatisfactory men from personal ads, while her hairdresser sister Debbie struggles to raise her 11-year-old son without much help from his irresponsible father. Meanwhile, Molly is pregnant but her husband Eddie has left his job without telling her.

Eileen and Bill, their parents, are virtually estranged since the departure of their eldest son Darren, who they have not heard from since he left home; having left, he is the only happy one in the family. Eileen takes her unsaid frustrations out on the neighbour's barking dog, poisoning it when it prevents her from sleeping.

Franklin is an over-sensitive man who frequents the coffee house where Nadia works. He is unable to summon the courage to talk to her, instead listening to music he thinks she would like alone in his bedroom. Nadia sleeps with one of her dates, the handsome Tim, but he is not really interested in her. Molly and Eddie have a fight when she discovers he has left his job and he leaves. She goes into labour believing he has permanently left her, but he has really had an accident on his motorbike. Debbie's son, Jack, is mugged when his father Dan leaves him alone and Jack goes off on his own to watch fireworks. Darren finally calls to let his family know that he is fine and Franklin has enough courage to talk to Nadia. Molly and Eddie are reunited at hospital after the birth of their daughter, Alice, a name Eddie selected because of Alice in Wonderland.

== Cast ==
- Shirley Henderson as Debbie
- Gina McKee as Nadia
- Molly Parker as Molly
- Ian Hart as Dan
- John Simm as Eddie
- Stuart Townsend as Tim
- Kika Markham as Eileen
- Jack Shepherd as Bill
- Enzo Cilenti as Darren
- Sarah-Jane Potts as Melanie
- David Fahm as Franklyn
- Ellen Thomas as Donna
- Peter Marfleet as Jack
- Nathan Constance as Alex
- Anton Saunders as Danny

== Production ==
The film's French writer, Laurence Coriat, was previously a psychology student. Winterbottom said that the script began in a similar way to Short Cuts and "the connections between the stories were purely down to geography" but was rewritten so that "the story of one sister tells you something about the other two." Cinematographer Sean Bobbitt had previously only worked on documentaries and news footage.

I was ... interested in exploring the emotional connections between people in a family who rarely meet, and in capturing the noise and excitement of London and the exhaustion of trying to keep your head above water in a place where you've got seven million people around you whose lives you don't know.

— Winterbottom, 2000

The film has both realist and impressionist elements. Time lapse photography is used to give moments of accelerated motion as the characters are followed, which Winterbottom said was inspired by Wong Kar-Wai's Chungking Express and gave an impressionistic feeling, "a rush of poignant colours and noise", and other footage is filmed on grainy hand-held 16mm cameras, giving a realist "fly-on-the-wall" feeling. The sex scenes are realistic and awkward – the scene between Nadia and Tim features no music, which highlights the sounds of kissing and rustling. A small crew was used, with only natural lighting and no sound boom. A pub scene was shot with real people in the background, near closing time, and the café where Nadia works is a real small café in Soho. People alone in London crowds were picked out and filmed to make the audience speculate about their stories. The scenes where Dan takes his son to a football match were filmed at Selhurst Park, the ground of Crystal Palace in a 1–1 draw against Birmingham City on 6 February 1999. Senses of Cinema said that the editing was "immaculate and exciting".

== Soundtrack ==
The soundtrack to Wonderland was composed by Michael Nyman, who has said it is his favourite score. The New York Times compared the score to that of Stewart Copeland for Rumble Fish and said that "the rhythms are like a clock ticking" and it is "alternately plaintive and mournful". The Guardian said it was "sumptuous, romantic". Senses of Cinema said the music was "heart-wrenching, full of tragic qualities, yet also extremely light".

== Release ==
The film's US debut was at the Sundance Film Festival in January 2000.

=== Critical reception ===
The New York Times argued that a scene in which Nadia slowly descends into tears on a double-decker bus as others party around her was "one of the most riveting scenes in a movie this year" (a scene The Guardian also said "rings true"), but found that "there is no sad turn in these characters' lives that you cannot see coming about an hour before". Michael Sauter of Entertainment Weekly wrote "director Michael Winterbottom finds both the quiet desperation and the glimmering hope in achingly ordinary lives", and gave the film a grade of A−. In contrast, his colleague Lisa Schwarzbaum gave the film a C, opining that while she liked Winterbottom's "loose, improvisatory feel", "the energy is sapped by clinging condescension in the guise of compassionate liberalism". The Guardian said that the filming of London's streets was similar to that of New York by Martin Scorsese, but complained about the characterisation, for example that with Nadia "we are given no insight into her struggles or her grinning social ineptitude," leaving the film "alienating and infuriating." They praised the acting, particularly the "desperately affecting" parents, but were annoyed by the attempts at Estuary English by the cast of non-Londoners. Senses of Cinema has called it "arguably one of Winterbottom's most accomplished works" and "a wonderful and very poignant film." The New Statesman wrote in 2016 that the film "far exceeds anything made during the kitchen-sink period in the breadth of its humanism and the range of its social portraiture, and deserves to be recognised as one of the great achievements of British cinema."

On the review aggregator website Rotten Tomatoes, 62% of 71 critics' reviews are positive, with an average rating of 6.1/10. The website's consensus reads: "A film that tackles something as simple as everyday life and succeeds beautifully. The witty script and clever direction keep the film flowing, while the superb acting keeps it alive. It doesn't aim for the sky and for that reason it hits its mark." Metacritic, which uses a weighted average, assigned the film a score of 71 out of 100, based on 28 critics, indicating "generally favorable" reviews.

== Themes and analysis ==
The New York Times said the film was "a modern-day London turn on Chekhov"'s Three Sisters and said that the sisters could be interpreted as different life stages of a single woman. The social realism of the film was compared to those of fellow British directors Ken Loach and Mike Leigh. Although the film has "an almost unbearable sadness" it is not bleak. The end of the film has a "dramatic coincidence" that brings the characters together for Molly giving birth, a sentimental narrative device that is a change from the relative lack of structure of the rest of the film, though Sense of Cinema also saw this final scene as "genuinely uplifting" and only giving tentative hope for the characters.

== Accolades ==
=== Awards ===
- British Independent Film Awards
  - Best British Film (won)

=== Nominations ===
- BAFTA Awards
  - Best British Film
- Boston Society of Film Critics Awards
  - Best Director – Michael Winterbottom
- British Independent Film Awards
  - Best Actress – Gina McKee
  - Best Director - Michael Winterbottom
- Cannes Film Festival
  - Palme d'Or – Michael Winterbottom
- Valladolid Film Festival
  - Best Film
