= British Independent Film Award for Best Director =

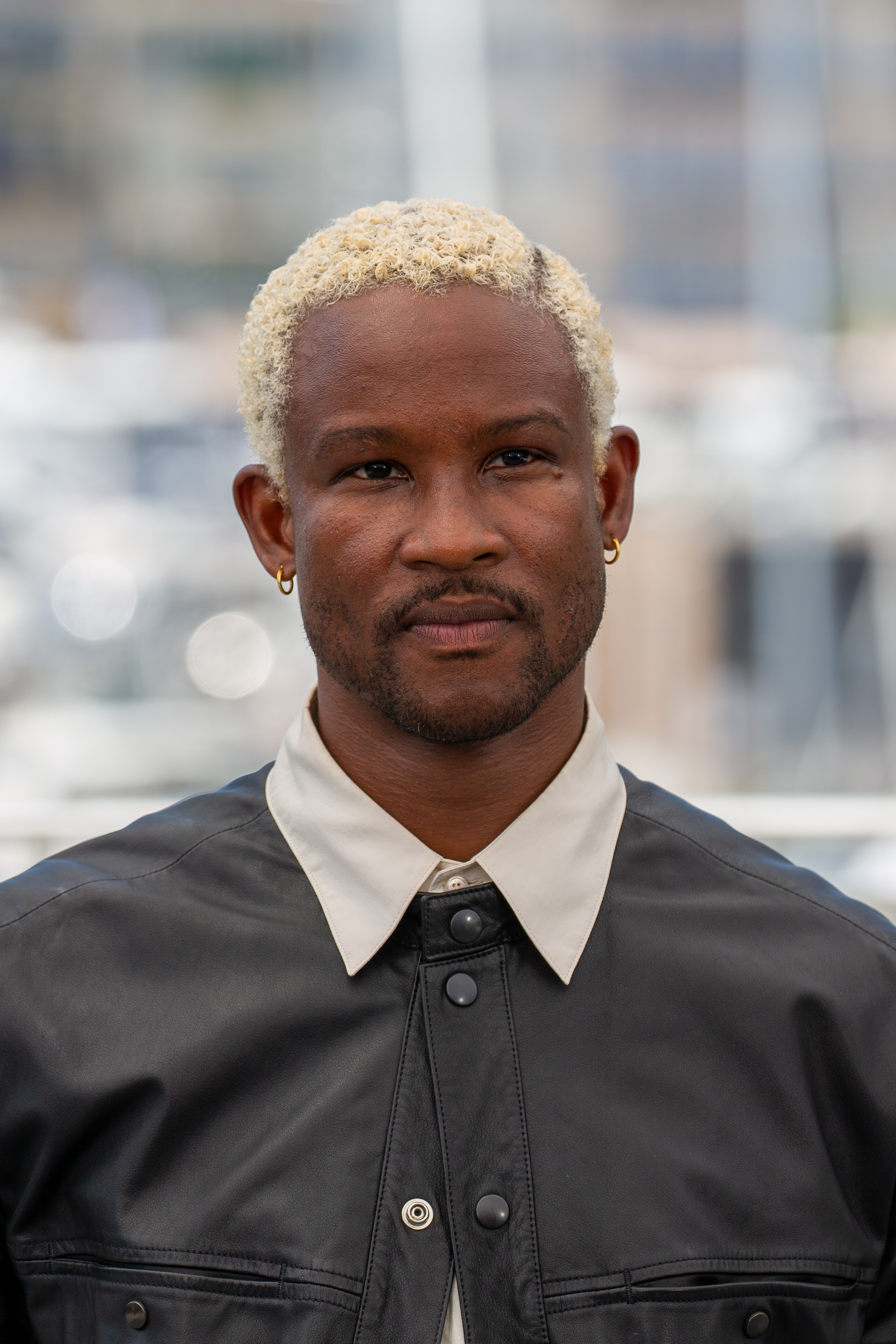
- 2025 recipient: Akinola Davies Jr.
- Awarded for: Best Directing
- Country: United Kingdom
- Presented by: BIFA
- First award: 1998
- Currently held by: Akinola Davies Jr. – My Father's Shadow (2025)
- Website: www.bifa.org.uk

The British Independent Film Award for Best Director is an annual award given by the British Independent Film Awards (BIFA) to recognize the best directing in a British independent film. The award was first presented in the 1998 ceremony being Ken Loach the first recipient of this award for his work in the film My Name is Joe.

Andrea Arnold and Rungano Nyoni are the only directors who have received this award more than once, with two wins each. Ken Loach holds the record of most nominations for this category with five, followed by Mike Leigh, Shane Meadows, and Michael Winterbottom, all with four each.

== Winners and nominees ==
=== 1990s ===
Year	Director(s)	Film
1998 (1st)	Ken Loach	My Name is Joe
1998 (1st)	Carine Adler	Under the Skin
1998 (1st)	Gillies MacKinnon	Regeneration
1998 (1st)	Gary Oldman	Nil by Mouth
1998 (1st)	Guy Ritchie	Lock, Stock and Two Smoking Barrels
1999 (2nd)	Anand Tucker	Hilary and Jackie
1999 (2nd)	Bill Condon	Gods and Monsters
1999 (2nd)	Shane Meadows	A Room for Romeo Brass
1999 (2nd)	Tim Roth	The War Zone
1999 (2nd)	Michael Winterbottom	Wonderland

=== 2000s ===
Year	Director(s)	Film
2000 (3rd)	Stephen Daldry	Billy Elliot
2000 (3rd)	Nigel Cole	Saving Grace
2000 (3rd)	Terence Davies	The House of Mirth
2000 (3rd)	Mike Leigh	Topsy-Turvy
2000 (3rd)	Paweł Pawlikowski	Last Resort
2001 (4th)	Jonathan Glazer	Sexy Beast
2001 (4th)	Michael Apted	Enigma
2001 (4th)	Ken Loach	Bread and Roses
2001 (4th)	Michael Winterbottom	The Claim
2002 (5th)	Paul Greengrass	Bloody Sunday
2002 (5th)	Neil Hunter and Tom Hunsinger	Lawless Heart
2002 (5th)	Ken Loach	Sweet Sixteen
2002 (5th)	Lynne Ramsay	Morvern Callar
2003 (6th)	Stephen Frears	Dirty Pretty Things
2003 (6th)	Danny Boyle	28 Days Later
2003 (6th)	David Mackenzie	Young Adam
2003 (6th)	Jim Sheridan	In America
2003 (6th)	Michael Winterbottom	In This World
2004 (7th)	Mike Leigh	Vera Drake
2004 (7th)	Kevin Macdonald	Touching the Void
2004 (7th)	Shane Meadows	Dead Man's Shoes
2004 (7th)	Roger Michell	Enduring Love
2004 (7th)	Paweł Pawlikowski	My Summer of Love
2005 (8th)	Neil Marshall	The Descent
2005 (8th)	Laurence Dunmore	The Libertine
2005 (8th)	Stephen Frears	Mrs Henderson Presents
2005 (8th)	Fernando Meirelles	The Constant Gardener
2005 (8th)	Michael Winterbottom	A Cock and Bull Story
2006 (9th)	Kevin Macdonald	The Last King of Scotland
2006 (9th)	Michael Caton-Jones	Shooting Dogs
2006 (9th)	Stephen Frears	The Queen
2006 (9th)	Ken Loach	The Wind That Shakes the Barley
2006 (9th)	Shane Meadows	This Is England
2007 (10th)	Anton Corbijn	Control
2007 (10th)	David Cronenberg	Eastern Promises
2007 (10th)	Sarah Gavron	Brick Lane
2007 (10th)	David Mackenzie	Hallam Foe
2007 (10th)	Anand Tucker	And When Did You Last See Your Father?
2008 (11th)	Danny Boyle	Slumdog Millionaire
2008 (11th)	Mark Herman	The Boy in the Striped Pyjamas
2008 (11th)	Garth Jennings	Son of Rambow
2008 (11th)	Steve McQueen	Hunger
2008 (11th)	Shane Meadows	Somers Town
2009 (12th)	Andrea Arnold	Fish Tank
2009 (12th)	Jane Campion	Bright Star
2009 (12th)	Armando Iannucci	In the Loop
2009 (12th)	Duncan Jones	Moon
2009 (12th)	Lone Scherfig	An Education

=== 2010s ===
Year	Director(s)	Film
2010 (13th)	Gareth Edwards	Monsters
2010 (13th)	Tom Hooper	The King's Speech
2010 (13th)	Mike Leigh	Another Year
2010 (13th)	Mark Romanek	Never Let Me Go
2010 (13th)	Matthew Vaughn	Kick-Ass
2011 (14th)	Lynne Ramsay	We Need to Talk About Kevin
2011 (14th)	Tomas Alfredson	Tinker Tailor Soldier Spy
2011 (14th)	Paddy Considine	Tyrannosaur
2011 (14th)	Steve McQueen	Shame
2011 (14th)	Ben Wheatley	Kill List
2012 (15th)	Peter Strickland	Berberian Sound Studio
2012 (15th)	Bart Layton	The Imposter
2012 (15th)	John Madden	The Best Exotic Marigold Hotel
2012 (15th)	Rufus Norris	Broken
2012 (15th)	Ben Wheatley	Sightseers
2013 (16th)	Sean Ellis	Metro Manila
2013 (16th)	Jon S. Baird	Filth
2013 (16th)	Clio Barnard	The Selfish Giant
2013 (16th)	Jonathan Glazer	Under the Skin
2013 (16th)	David Mackenzie	Starred Up
2014 (17th)	Yann Demange	'71
2014 (17th)	Lenny Abrahamson	Frank
2014 (17th)	Mike Leigh	Mr. Turner
2014 (17th)	John Michael McDonagh	Calvary
2014 (17th)	Matthew Warchus	Pride
2015 (18th)	Alex Garland	Ex Machina
2015 (18th)	Andrew Haigh	45 Years
2015 (18th)	Asif Kapadia	Amy
2015 (18th)	Justin Kurzel	Macbeth
2015 (18th)	Yorgos Lanthimos	The Lobster
2016 (19th)	Andrea Arnold	American Honey
2016 (19th)	Babak Anvari	Under the Shadow
2016 (19th)	Ken Loach	I, Daniel Blake
2016 (19th)	James Spinney and Pete Middleton	Notes on Blindness
2016 (19th)	Ben Wheatley	Free Fire
2017 (20th)	Rungano Nyoni	I Am Not a Witch
2017 (20th)	Armando Iannucci	The Death of Stalin
2017 (20th)	Francis Lee	God's Own Country
2017 (20th)	Martin McDonagh	Three Billboards Outside Ebbing, Missouri
2017 (20th)	William Oldroyd	Lady Macbeth
2018 (21st)	Yorgos Lanthimos	The Favourite
2018 (21st)	Andrew Haigh	Lean on Pete
2018 (21st)	Bart Layton	American Animals
2018 (21st)	Michael Pearce	Beast
2018 (21st)	Lynne Ramsay	You Were Never Really Here
2019 (22nd)	Waad Al-Kateab and Edward Watts	For Sama
2019 (22nd)	Oliver Hermanus	Moffie
2019 (22nd)	Joanna Hogg	The Souvenir
2019 (22nd)	Mark Jenkin	Bait
2019 (22nd)	Asif Kapadia	Diego Maradona

=== 2020s ===
Year	Director(s)	Film
2020 (23rd)
2020 (23rd)	Remi Weekes	His House
2020 (23rd)	Sarah Gavron	Rocks
2020 (23rd)	Rose Glass	Saint Maud
2020 (23rd)	Nick Rowland	Calm with Horses
2020 (23rd)	Florian Zeller	The Father
2021 (24th)
2021 (24th)	Aleem Khan	After Love
2021 (24th)	Philip Barantini	Boiling Point
2021 (24th)	Clio Barnard	Ali & Ava
2021 (24th)	Sean Durkin	The Nest
2021 (24th)	Joanna Hogg	The Souvenir Part II
2022 (25th)
2022 (25th)	Charlotte Wells	Aftersun
2022 (25th)	Oliver Hermanus	Living
2022 (25th)	Sophie Hyde	Good Luck to You, Leo Grande
2022 (25th)	Sebastián Lelio	The Wonder
2022 (25th)	Georgia Oakley	Blue Jean
2023 (26th)
2023 (26th)	Andrew Haigh	All of Us Strangers
2023 (26th)	Raine Allen-Miller	Rye Lane
2023 (26th)	Sam H. Freeman and Ng Choon Ping	Femme
2023 (26th)	Molly Manning Walker	How to Have Sex
2023 (26th)	Charlotte Regan	Scrapper
2024 (27th)
2024 (27th)	Rungano Nyoni	On Becoming a Guinea Fowl
2024 (27th)	Andrea Arnold	Bird
2024 (27th)	Nora Fingscheidt	The Outrun
2024 (27th)	Rose Glass	Love Lies Bleeding
2024 (27th)	Rich Peppiatt	Kneecap
2025 (28th)	Akinola Davies Jr.	My Father's Shadow
2025 (28th)	Laura Carreira	On Falling
2025 (28th)	Kirk Jones	I Swear
2025 (28th)	Harry Lighton	Pillion
2025 (28th)	Lynne Ramsay	Die My Love

== Multiple nominations ==
5 nominations

- Ken Loach

4 nominations

- Mike Leigh
- Shane Meadows
- Lynne Ramsay
- Michael Winterbottom

3 nominations

- Andrea Arnold
- Stephen Frears
- Andrew Haigh
- David Mackenzie
- Ben Wheatley

2 nominations

- Clio Barnard
- Danny Boyle
- Sarah Gavron
- Jonathan Glazer
- Oliver Hermanus
- Joanna Hogg
- Armando Iannucci
- Asif Kapadia
- Yorgos Lanthimos
- Bart Layton
- Kevin Macdonald
- Steve McQueen
- Rungano Nyoni
- Paweł Pawlikowski
- Anand Tucker

== Multiple wins ==
2 wins

- Andrea Arnold
- Rungano Nyoni
