= Swimmer (2012 film) =

- Directed by: Lynne Ramsay
- Produced by: Peter Carlton; Diarmid Scrimshaw
- Cinematography: Natasha Braier
- Edited by: Adam Biskupski
- Release date: 2012
- Running time: 18 minutes
- Country: United Kingdom
- Language: English

Swimmer is a 2012 Scottish short film directed by Lynne Ramsay. The film won Best Short Film at the 66th British Academy Film Awards.

== Cast ==
Tom Litten as The Swimmer

== Production ==
The film was one of 4 unique co-commissions in partnership between BBC Films, Film4 and the London Organising Committee of the Olympic and Paralympic Games to celebrate the 2012 Summer Olympics.

== Reception ==
Director Lynne Ramsay was nominated for Best Short at the British Independent Film Awards (BIFA). Ramsay went on to receive a BAFTA Award for Best Short Film at the 66th British Academy Film Awards in 2013 for Swimmer.
