= Ratcatcher (film) =

1999 film by Scottish director Lynne Ramsay

- Theatrical release poster
- Directed by: Lynne Ramsay
- Written by: Lynne Ramsay
- Produced by: Gavin Emerson
- Starring: William Eadie; Tommy Flanagan; Mandy Matthews
- Cinematography: Alwin H. Küchler
- Edited by: Lucia Zucchetti
- Music by: Rachel Portman
- Production companies: Pathé Pictures International; BBC Films
- Distributed by: Pathé Distribution; Diaphana Films
- Release dates: 13 May 1999 (Cannes); 12 November 1999 (United Kingdom); 12 January 2000 (France)
- Running time: 94 minutes
- Countries: United Kingdom; France
- Languages: English; Glasgow dialect
- Budget: £2 million
- Box office: $888,817

Ratcatcher is a 1999 social realist drama film written and directed by Lynne Ramsay. Set in Glasgow, Scotland, it is her debut feature film and was screened in the Un Certain Regard section at the 1999 Cannes Film Festival.

The film won its director numerous awards including the Carl Foreman Award for Newcomer in British Film at the BAFTA Awards, the Sutherland Trophy at the London Film Festival and the Silver Hugo for Best Director at the Chicago International Film Festival. Ratcatcher grossed $888,817 worldwide. It was released on DVD and Blu-ray by the Criterion Collection.

== Plot ==
In 1970s Glasgow, Scotland, Ryan Quinn entangles himself in curtains before his mother reprimands and readies him to visit his father. Ryan instead chooses to run off and play with his friend James Gillespie at the canal. After James' head is held underwater by Ryan as a prank, James retaliates by pushing him into the canal where he resultantly drowns. With no apparent witnesses, James flees but experiences profound guilt from the incident.

The Quinn and Gillespie families live in a dilapidated Glasgow council estate which is frequently strewn with refuse. The former are soon re-homed; before leaving the estate, Ryan's mother gives James a pair of brown sandals she had bought for him on the day of his death, which James purposefully scratches with a piece of broken glass.

James, more sensitive than other boys of his age, tries to make sense of his hometown's harsh environment. He encounters the local gang bullying a girl, Margaret Anne, as they throw her glasses into the canal; James does nothing. He soon joins the gang (despite their threat of being thrown into the canal) and watches as the rest of them sexually abuse her. When James is offered a turn, he lies fully clothed on her as she strokes his head tenderly.

James later takes a bus to the end of its route on the outskirts of Glasgow, where he explores a new housing estate under construction. Standing in front of a kitchen window in a half-built house, he is awestruck by the view of an expansive wheat field blowing in the wind. He then climbs through the window and escapes into the field.

Kenny, a simple boy and friend of James, receives a pet mouse as a birthday present. After the gang throw the mouse around in the air to make him "fly," Kenny asks James where he would fly to. James, trying to prevent the gang from throwing it at the wall, suggests the Moon. Kenny then ties the mouse's tail to a balloon and releases it as the boys watch. In a fantastical shift, the film shows the mouse floating to the Moon, where it soon joins a colony of mice.

Kenny later falls in the canal trying to catch a perch and is rescued by James' father, who becomes a local hero and is given a medal for bravery. While his father is in a deep sleep following the rescue, James allows in council inspectors tasked with assessing merit for rehousing; in his disheveled state, his father makes a poor impression on the inspectors. He berates James for the mistake and says that their likely rehousing rejection would be his son's fault.

After receiving the medal, his father goes out drinking with friends. He also buys a pair of cleats for James, presumably to mend their relationship. The local gang happens upon James' father on the way home and slashes him with a switchblade. When he returns home drunk and injured, he forcefully offers the cleats to James, who rejects them. As James's mother tries to tend to his father's injuries, he slaps her as the family watch on. James throws the cleats at him before fleeing to Margaret Anne's home; she and James become close and find comfort in each other's company. As the two embrace in bed, she asks him if he loves her, which he confirms.

The Army eventually arrive to remove the increasingly abundant refuse from the neighbourhood. After failing to recover Margaret Anne's glasses from the canal, James sees her with the local gang, who are once again taking turns sexually abusing her. James snaps at Kenny, saying that he killed his own mouse. Kenny retaliates with taunts toward Margaret Anne and the revelation that he witnessed James accidentally kill Ryan, both of which enrage James.

After a tender moment with his sister, James wakes early and goes to the canal, where he sinks amongst the murky water. The scene is intercut with the Gillespie family moving into the new housing estate that James had explored earlier, carrying their furniture and possessions across the wheat field. James looks at the camera as his face breaks into a full smile, before it returns to him floating motionlessly in the canal.

== Cast ==
- William Eadie as James Gillespie
- Tommy Flanagan as George Gillespie (Da)
- Mandy Matthews as Anne Gillespie (Ma)
- Michelle Stewart as Ellen Gillespie
- Lynne Ramsay Jr. as Anne Marie Gillespie
- Leanne Mullen as Margaret Anne
- John Miller as Kenny
- Thomas McTaggart as Ryan Quinn
- Jackie Quinn as Mrs. Quinn
- James Ramsay as Mr. Quinn

== Production ==
Director Lynne Ramsay began developing Ratcatcher after two previous short films—Small Deaths (1995) and Gasman (1997)—each received the Short Film Palme D'Or jury prize. A third short film, Kill the Day, received the jury prize at the Clermont-Ferrand International Short Film Festival in 1996. After seeing these shorts, BBC Scotland development producer Ruth McCance requested a treatment on the film, which Ramsay said was unusually long at around 50 pages. The film was eventually produced by BBC Scotland and Pathé.

For Ratcatcher, Ramsay retained the same cinematographer (Alwin H. Küchler), editor (Lucia Zucchetti) and production designer (Jane Morton), as well as producer Gavin Emerson, from her three successful short films. Ramsay sought non-actors for the roles—she cast her niece Lynne Ramsay Jr. as the protagonist's little sister and her brother James in a small role as a bereaved father—citing their authentically imperfect faces and ability to act genuinely. Ramsay also did not explain any of the broader script progression to the child actors, feeling that too much detail would become distracting and detract from their spontaneity. The opening scene, featuring Ryan Quinn enmeshed in curtains, was the first scene Ramsay wrote for the movie.

Ratcatcher was shot in the Govan neighborhood of Glasgow, which was intended to reflect the "ugly beautiful" contrasts of life there. Though Ramsay grew up in Glasgow during the film's time period, she did not imagine it as autobiographical. Ramsay described vague memory of the binmen's strikes, but mainly chose that specific setting as a way to demonstrate the grime of poverty and the potential for a boy's grim imagination to persist. While Ramsay's experience sits at a remove from the events of the story, she affirmed the film's Glaswegian roots, saying that "if [she] had grown up in Sussex, she'd have probably made a very different film."The production team also incorporated out-of-time aspects of the 1950s, 1960s, and 1970s, to prevent the film from being overrun with "kitsch nostalgia of the 1970s."

The decision to center the story around a young male lead came from Ramsay's interest in the phenomena of pack mentality and emotional desensitization, which she felt were better reflected in a pre-teen boy. When the movie was released, director Lynne Ramsay defended the nude bathing scene between the characters of James and Margaret Anne from accusations by Scottish tabloids that the film contained underage sex:

That scene's very innocent, actually. Maybe there's an element that's latently sexual, really it's two kids having a laugh in the bath. When you're a kid, you do things that are pretty risqué - the kind of things that no one will admit to their mothers and fathers but we all did. I was very lucky to get that scene - but it was the toughest I've ever shot.

Ratcatcher was the second-ever feature film directed by a Scottish woman, after Margaret Tait's Blue Black Permanent (1992). The film grossed $888,817 worldwide. It was released on DVD and Blu-ray by the Criterion Collection.

== Reception ==
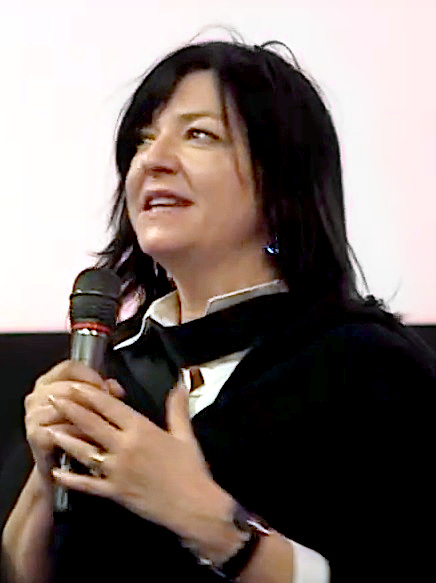
Critics praised Lynne Ramsay's direction.

Ratcatcher received critical acclaim. Review aggregator Rotten Tomatoes gave it a score of 86%, based on 50 critic ratings. The site's critical consensus reads "critics find Ratcatcher to be hauntingly beautiful, though its story is somewhat hard to stomach." Metacritic, which assigns a rating out of 100 to reviews from mainstream critics, has a "generally favorable" score of 77 based on 22 reviews.

The film premiered at the 1999 Cannes Film Festival where it was nominated for the Un Certain Regard award. Jonathan Romney wrote at the time for The Guardian that the film revealed Ramsay as a "fully fledged visionary" on her debut. For Variety, European correspondent David Rooney hailed its impressionistic and "quasi-magical quality."

Upon its wider release in the United Kingdom in November 1999, other critics praised the film. Peter Bradshaw wrote that the film was "a shimmering, transcendental poem, hyper-real in its heightened perception of light, shape and proportion, and invested with such sweetness and humour, disclosing a gentle humanity amid the impacts and abrasions of the inner-city existence it portrays."

Ratcatcher received its American debut at the Chicago International Film Festival in October 1999, where it won the Silver Hugo for Best Director, before playing at the New Directors/New Films Festival in April 2000, where The New York Times named it a critic's pick. Elvis Mitchell wrote that the film "provides an intimacy that is completely mesmerizing. Rarely has physical wretchedness been rendered with such delicacy." For the Los Angeles Times, Kenneth Turan ranked it as his favorite release of 2000, citing Ramsay's essential talent for film-making and the hope that Ratcatcher's American release—as a small international art film with heavily accented English dialogue—gave him for the future of film releases.

Despite its generally positive reception, some reviewers felt the film to have its flaws. San Francisco Chronicle critic Mick LaSalle praised Ramsay's shot selection and William Eadie's lead performance, but struggled with the strong Glaswegian accents and overall felt Ratcatcher was "better contemplated than experienced." New York Post critic Lou Lumenick likewise has written that Ratcatcher was a "misery wallow" and that Ramsay often made use of "unappealing British miserabilism."

A 2019 BBC Culture survey of international film critics and experts ranked Ratcatcher the 66th best film directed by a woman. American director Barry Jenkins has called it one of his favorite films and formative to his own work. In a 2025 interview, English actor Gary Oldman named Ratcatcher as his favorite British film.

The film is frequently compared to the work of Ken Loach—especially his second feature film Kes—as well as Bill Douglas's 1970s "Childhood Trilogy" and François Truffaut's The 400 Blows. Ramsay cited as her own source of inspiration Robert Bresson's Notes on Cinematography and the work of photographers Robert Frank, Nan Goldin, and Richard Billingham.

Film theorist Stella Hockenhull has credited Ratcatcher with being one of the first films by female directors to depict "realism through rich visual imagery rather than symbolic socio-political concerns," a technique later echoed by The Selfish Giant and Fish Tank.

== Awards and nominations ==
Year	Award	Category	Nominee	Result	Ref.
2000	BAFTA Awards	Outstanding Debut by a British Writer, Director or Producer	Lynne Ramsay	Won	
2000	BAFTA Awards	Outstanding British Film	Lynne Ramsay, Gavin Emerson	Nominated	
2000	Bratislava International Film Festival	Best Actress	Mandy Matthews	Won	
2000	Bratislava International Film Festival	Grand Prix	Lynne Ramsay	Won	
1999	British Film Institute	Sutherland Trophy	Lynne Ramsay	Won	
1999	British Independent Film Awards	Douglas Hickox Award	Lynne Ramsay	Won	
1999	British Independent Film Awards	Best Screenplay	Lynne Ramsay	Nominated	
1999	British Independent Film Awards	Most Promising Newcomer	Alwin H. Küchler	Nominated	
1999	Cannes Film Festival	Un Certain Regard Award	Lynne Ramsay	Nominated	
1999	Chicago International Film Festival	Silver Hugo Award (Best Director)	Lynne Ramsay	Won	
1999	Edinburgh International Film Festival	New Director’s Award	Lynne Ramsay	Won	
1999	Film Fest Gent	Georges Delerue Award	Rachel Portman	Won	
1999	Film Fest Gent	Grand Prix	Lynne Ramsay	Nominated	
2000	London Film Critics’ Circle Awards	British Director of the Year	Lynne Ramsay	Won	
2000	Riga International Film Forum	FIPRESCI Prize	Lynne Ramsay	Won	
