= Morvern Callar (film) =

2002 film directed by Lynne Ramsay

- Directed by: Lynne Ramsay
- Screenplay by: Lynne Ramsay; Liana Dognini
- Based on: Morvern Callar by Alan Warner
- Produced by: Robyn Slovo; Charles Pattinson; George Faber
- Starring: Samantha Morton; Kathleen McDermott; Paul Popplewell; Bryan Dick
- Cinematography: Alwin H. Küchler
- Edited by: Lucia Zucchetti
- Production company: Company Pictures
- Distributed by: Momentum Pictures
- Release dates: 19 May 2002 (Cannes); 1 November 2002 (United Kingdom)
- Running time: 97 minutes
- Countries: United Kingdom; Canada
- Language: English
- Box office: US$869,820

Morvern Callar is a 2002 psychological drama film directed by Lynne Ramsay and starring Samantha Morton as the title character and Kathleen McDermott. The screenplay, cowritten by Ramsay and Liana Dognini, was based on the 1995 novel of the same name by Alan Warner. It follows a young woman in a small Scottish port town who, in the aftermath of her boyfriend's suicide, conceals his death before embarking on a road trip with her friend.

A co-production between the United Kingdom and Canada, Morvern Callar premiered at the 2002 Cannes Film Festival, and was released theatrically in the United Kingdom on 1 November 2002. It received favorable reviews from film critics. The film was nominated for seven awards at the British Independent Film Awards, with Morton winning for Best Actress and cinematography Alwin H. Küchler winning for Best Technical Achievement, while McDermott won the award for Best Actress at the BAFTA Scotland Awards.

== Plot ==
Morvern Callar is a young woman living in a Scottish port town, where she works at a supermarket. On Christmas morning, she wakes to discover that her boyfriend has died by suicide. He has left her a mixtape, Christmas presents, money for a funeral, the manuscript of his unpublished novel (which he has dedicated to Morvern) and a suicide note stating his reasoning; that it "just felt like the right thing to do." She replaces his name with her own on the manuscript's cover page, before sending it to the publisher mentioned in the note. Morvern does not inform the authorities of his death and leaves his body in situ. She tells her best friend and co-worker, Lanna, that her boyfriend has left her and moved abroad.

After several days, Morvern dismembers the body and buries it in the hills. She cleans the flat to remove all traces of blood and invites Lanna to move in with her. Morvern receives a letter of interest from the book publisher and calls to inform them that they can reach her while she is on holiday in Spain. Lanna confesses to Morvern that she had slept with her boyfriend before apologising. Despite Morvern's anger toward her, she still brings her to Spain, where they enjoy the nightlife together.

At the hotel, Morvern meets and has sex with a man whose mother has recently died. The next day, Morvern abruptly tells Lanna that they must leave the hotel. They travel to another town but get lost and end up spending the night on a rural road. Lanna becomes increasingly frustrated by Morvern's erratic behavior, and they part ways the next morning. Morvern meets with the publishers, who have travelled to Spain hoping to acquire the rights to the manuscript. She continues to claim that she wrote the novel and accepts a £100,000 advance.

Back in Scotland with her £100,000 cheque, Morvern invites Lanna to accompany her to Spain again, but Lanna refuses, stating that her life is in Scotland. Morvern collects her suitcase and heads to the railway station. In a nightclub, she listens to "Dedicated to the One I Love" from the mixtape her boyfriend had left for her.

== Cast ==
- Samantha Morton as Morvern Callar
- Kathleen McDermott as Lanna Phimister
- Linda McGuire as Vanessa
- Paul Popplewell as Cat in the Hat
- Ruby Milton as Couris Jean
- Dolly Wells as Susan
- Dan Cadan as Dazzer
- Carolyn Calder as Sheila Tequila

== Production ==
A substantial portion of the film was shot in Almería, Spain. The Scottish scenes were filmed in Oban.

== Soundtrack ==
The official motion picture soundtrack for Morvern Callar was released on January 28, 2003, by Alliance Atlantis Records.

No.	Title	Artist	Length
1.	"I Want More"	Can	3:32
2.	"Goon Gumpas"	Aphex Twin	1:58
3.	"Everything You Do Is a Balloon"	Boards of Canada	7:00
4.	"Spoon"	Can	3:04
5.	"Blue Milk (Edit)"	Stereolab	8:00
6.	"I'm Sticking With You"	The Velvet Underground	3:08
7.	"You Can Fall"	Broadcast	4:24
8.	"Drumming"	Gamelan	1:28
9.	"Cool in the Pool"	Holger Czukay	5:01
10.	"Hold of Death"	Lee "Scratch" Perry	3:02
11.	"Some Velvet Morning"	Nancy Sinatra and Lee Hazlewood	3:35
12.	"Japanese Cowboy"	Ween	3:02
13.	"Fragrance"	Holger Czukay	4:09
14.	"Nannou"	Aphex Twin	4:13
Total length:			55:36

Additionally, the film features the following songs not included on the official soundtrack: "Cînd eram la '48" by Taraf de Haïdouks, and "Dedicated to the One I Love" by The Mamas & the Papas.

== Release ==
Morvern Callar was released theatrically in the United Kingdom on 1 November 2002. In the United States, it opened in a limited release on 20 December 2002.

== Reception ==
=== Box office ===
Morvern Callar grossed US$267,907 in the United Kingdom and $600,406 in international territories, for a worldwide box-office gross of $869,820.

=== Critical response ===
Morvern Callar received positive reviews from critics. On the review aggregator website Rotten Tomatoes, 85% of 87 critics' reviews are positive. The website's consensus reads: "Morton quietly makes this quirky, enigmatic mood piece a compelling watch." Metacritic, which uses a weighted average, assigned the film a score of 78 out of 100, based on 25 critics, indicating "generally favorable" reviews.

Peter Bradshaw of The Guardian awarded the film five out of five stars, writing: "This is a mesmeric, startling and sometimes baffling movie from Lynne Ramsay, the follow-up to her magnificent debut Ratcatcher; and while it may not have the closed perfection of that film, it undoubtedly announces Ramsay as one of the most distinctive talents in British cinema, and certainly one of the very few with the conviction to be taken seriously as an auteur, in the highest and most fully unapologetic sense of the word." Elvis Mitchell of The New York Times called the film "blithely powerful" and praised Morton's performance.

Kevin Thomas of the Los Angeles Times awarded the film a favorable review, writing that it "has an admirable spareness and tension as one sequence connects to the next, tautly but with the randomness of Morvern’s new existence. The film is almost entirely a visual experience, and the images of cinematographer Alwin Kuchler (who also shot Ratcatcher) are as beautiful and expressive as Morton’s Morvern is herself."

Steve Jelbert of The Independent gave the film a mixed review, describing its visuals as "painterly" but feeling the novel did not translate sufficiently to film: "It's a strangely unsatisfying experience. Choosing a practically unfilmable source text, strongly dependent on inner dialogue, leaves the work so image-dependent that it becomes little more than a series of tableaux... Morvern Callar is never less than watchable. But there are some things which books do better than cinema."

=== Accolades ===
Award/association	Year	Category	Recipient(s) and nominee(s)	Result	Ref.
BAFTA Scotland	2002	Best Actress	Kathleen McDermott	Won	
British Independent Film Awards	2002	Best British Independent Film	Morvern Callar	Nominated	
British Independent Film Awards	2002	Best Director	Lynne Ramsay	Nominated	
British Independent Film Awards	2002	Best Actress	Samantha Morton	Won	
British Independent Film Awards	2002	Best Screenplay	Lynne Ramsay; Liana Dognini	Nominated	
British Independent Film Awards	2002	Best Newcomer	Kathleen McDermott	Nominated	
British Independent Film Awards	2002	Best Achievement in Production	Morvern Callar	Nominated	
British Independent Film Awards	2002	Best Technical Achievement	Alwin H. Küchler	Won	
Cannes Film Festival	2002	Youth Award – Best Foreign Film	Lynne Ramsay	Won	
Cannes Film Festival	2002	C.I.C.A.E. Award	Lynne Ramsay	Won	
Cannes Film Festival	2002	SACD Prize – Director's Fortnight	Lynne Ramsay	Won	
Chicago International Film Festival	2002	Golden Hugo Award	Lynne Ramsay	Nominated	
Chlotrudis Society for Independent Films	2002	Best Director	Lynne Ramsay	Nominated	
Chlotrudis Society for Independent Films	2002	Best Actress	Samantha Morton	Nominated	
Chlotrudis Society for Independent Films	2002	Best Adapted Screenplay	Liana Dognini; Lynne Ramsay	Nominated	
Dinard British Film Festival	2002	Best Cinematography	Alwin H. Küchler	Won	
Dinard British Film Festival	2002	Golden Hitchcock	Lynne Ramsay	Nominated	
European Film Awards	2002	Best Actress	Samantha Morton	Nominated	
European Film Awards	2002	Best Cinematographer	Alwin H. Küchler	Nominated	
Golden Trailer Awards	2002	Best Foreign Trailer	Morvern Callar	Nominated	
London Film Critics' Circle	2002	Actress of the Year	Samantha Morton	Nominated	
Los Angeles Film Critics Association	2002	New Generation Award	Lynne Ramsay	Won	
San Sebastián International Film Festival	2002	FIPRESCI Director of the Year	Lynne Ramsay	Won	
Stockholm International Film Festival	2002	Best Cinematography	Alwin H. Küchler	Won	
Toronto Film Critics Association Awards	2003	Best Actress	Samantha Morton	Won	
Village Voice Film Poll	2002	Best Performance	Samantha Morton	7th place	

== Legacy ==
In the 2022 Sight and Sound critics' poll, Morvern Callar was ranked 243rd on the list of best movies of all time.

The film has been cited as a favorite film by the band Beach House, who introduced it at the inaugural edition of Baltimore's New/Next Film Festival.

Writing for a film club hosted by Literary Hub, Rachel Kushner picked Morvern Callar as one of her favorite movies, calling it a "gritty and sublime mood portrait".

Musician Kim Gordon, best known for Sonic Youth, named Morvern Callar as one of her favorite movies and an influence on her own art. She especially highlights the soundtrack of the film, calling it a "character" and "a thread throughout the film".

Director Sean Baker named Morvern Callar as one of his ten favorite films of the 21st century in the poll conducted by The New York Times in 2025.
