= Lynne Ramsay =

Scottish filmmaker (born 1969)

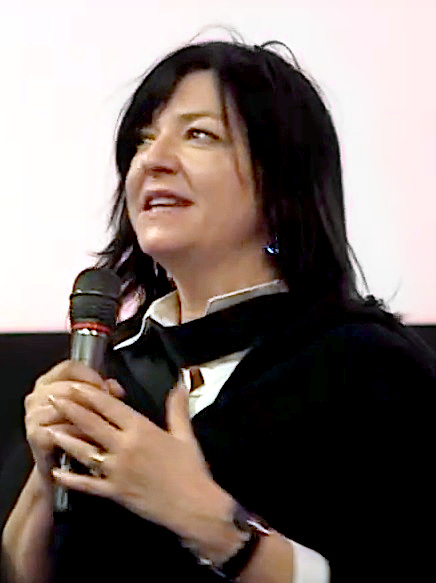
- Ramsay in 2018
- Born: 5 December 1969 (age 56); Glasgow, Scotland
- Occupation: Filmmaker
- Years active: 1995–present
- Spouse(s): Rory Stewart Kinnear (divorced)
- Children: 1

Lynne Ramsay (born 5 December 1969) is a Scottish filmmaker known for films such as Ratcatcher (1999), Morvern Callar (2002), We Need to Talk About Kevin (2011), You Were Never Really Here (2017), and Die My Love (2025). She has received numerous accolades. Her work is marked by a fascination with children, young people, and mothers, as well as the recurring themes of grief, guilt, death, and the aftermath of each.

== Early life and education ==
Ramsay was born into a working-class family in Glasgow on 5 December 1969. Her mother, Eleanor, introduced her to films at an early age through the works of Bette Davis, Nicolas Roeg, Alfred Hitchcock, and Michael Curtiz. She also credits The Wizard of Oz (1939) as an inspiration. She had an early passion for painting which gave way to photography, and studied fine art and photography at Edinburgh Napier University. While there, she watched Meshes of the Afternoon (1943), which she later cited as a turning point as it inspired her to apply to film school on a whim and begin pursuing film. She moved to England to attend the National Film and Television School in Beaconsfield, graduating in 1995 with a focus on cinematography and direction.

== Career ==
=== 1996–1998: Short films ===
In 1996, Ramsay completed her debut short film Small Deaths as her graduating film at the National Film and Television School. It is a series of three vignettes of children grappling with familial realities and the repercussions of their actions. Ramsay is the writer, director and cinematographer on the film, After it was bought by the producer Gavin Emerson he submitted it for the 1996 Cannes Film Festival where it won the Short Film Prix du Jury. Later that same year Ramsay finished Kill the Day, her second short film. It captures a day in the life of a heroin addict recently released from jail, and tackles the theme of memory.

Gasman (1998), also written and directed by Ramsay, is about a brother and sister who attend a Christmas party with their father, and encounter two other children who are strangely familiar with him. This won her another Prix du Jury that year as well as a nomination for a BAFTA Award for Best Short Film.

=== 1999–2002: Ratcatcher and Morvern Callar ===
Ramsay's short films impressed Ruth McCance of BBC Scotland, who approached Ramsay to write a treatment for a feature film. This project became Ramsay's debut feature Ratcatcher which released in 1999 and was funded by BBC Scotland and Pathé. The film's crew was composed entirely of first-time filmmakers, as Ramsay enlisted the help of her film school colleagues. Ratcatcher is set in Maryhill during the binmen's strike of the 1970s and follows James (William Eadie), the child of a struggling working-class family. The film received great critical success and while an arthouse hit, didn't reach a wider audience. It was screened at the 1999 Cannes Film Festival and opened the Edinburgh International Film Festival, winning her the BAFTA Award for Outstanding Debut by a British Writer, Director or Producer.

Morvern Callar (2002) is based on Alan Warner's existential 1995 novel of the same name. The film follows a young woman (Samantha Morton) adrift in Europe following the suicide of her boyfriend, which she doesn't report to the police. The movie has been described as a portrait of subversive grief and dissociation. The movie's soundtrack included acts like Can, Aphex Twin, Boards of Canada, Broadcast and The Mamas & the Papas. The film had a theatrical rerelease for its 20th anniversary in 2022, with Ramsay in attendance for one screening, from which she noted the younger audience's positive connection to her sophomore feature.

=== 2010–2019: Established work ===
After a long hiatus Ramsay returned in 2011 with We Need to Talk About Kevin. The film, based on Lionel Shriver's novel of the same name, is about a mother (Tilda Swinton) dealing with the aftermath of a school massacre committed by her own son (Ezra Miller). It is again directed by Ramsay and this time co-written with her then-husband Rory Stewart Kinnear. Ramsay recalls working together with Jonny Greenwood for the soundtrack of the movie as an especially exciting part of the process. Kevin premiered at the 2011 Cannes Film Festival in competition for the Palme d'Or to positive reviews, with specific acclaim for Swinton's performance, as well as Ramsay's direction and screenplay. Chicago Sun-Times critic Roger Ebert raved it as a "masterful film," and Kenneth Turan of Los Angeles Times spoke of it as "a disturbing tale told with uncompromising emotionality and great skill by filmmaker Lynne Ramsay." Ramsay received nominations for the BAFTA Award for Best Direction and Outstanding British Film, AACTA Award for Best Direction, and BIFA Award for Best Director, winning for the lattermost.

Starting in 2011, Ramsay was sharing plans to direct a modern science-fiction adaptation of Herman Melville's Moby Dick called Mobius. The film was to be set in space, and deal with themes of psychology and claustrophobia. Ramsay explained: "So we're creating a whole new world, and a new alien. [It's] a very psychological piece, mainly taking place in the ship, a bit like Das Boot, so it's quite claustrophobic. It's another monster movie, cos the monster's Ahab." She secured funding for the project in 2012, but as of 2023 the film remains in development. The short film Swimmer (2012), was co-commissioned by BBC Films, Film4 and the London Organising Committee of the Olympic and Paralympic Games. It won a BAFTA Award for Best Short Film at the 66th British Academy Film Awards in 2013.

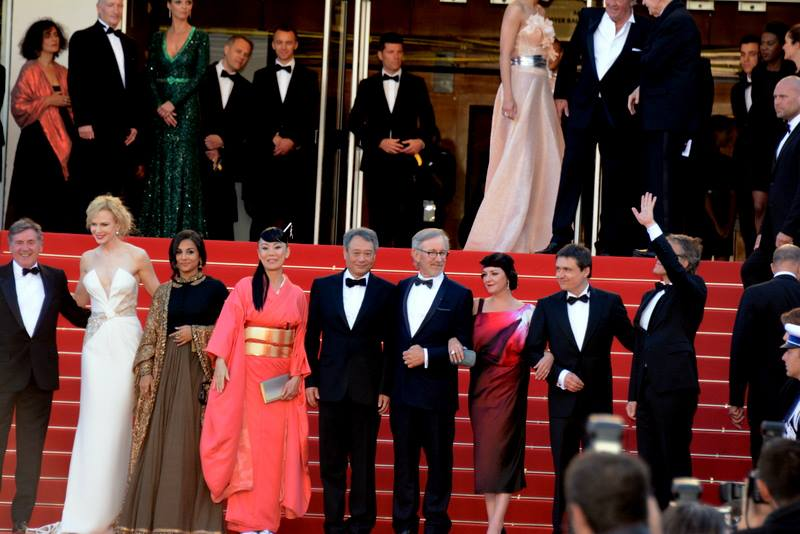
Cannes jury including Ramsay (2013)

In April 2013, she was selected as a member of the main competition jury at the 2013 Cannes Film Festival. In 2015, she was named as a member of the jury for the main competition at the 2015 Venice Film Festival.

You Were Never Really Here, an adaptation of Jonathan Ames's novella of the same name, premiered to wide critical acclaim at the 70th Cannes Film Festival in 2017, where it received a standing ovation, and Ramsay won the Best Screenplay award. The film, starring Joaquin Phoenix as Joe, a war veteran and hitman saving young girls from sex trafficking, was picked up by Amazon Studios. It follows a "shattered [...] narrative structure" in trying to capture the effects of PTSD on the mind. The movie also marks the second collaboration with Jonny Greenwood. She later said she "found her soulmate in making movies" in Phoenix. Brigitte, a short documentary on Brigitte Lacombe, was released in 2019 after being commissioned as part of Miu Miu's Women's Tales series. The movie sees both women, who usually prefer being behind the camera, shooting each other.

Following You Were Never Really Here, Ramsay hoped to next make the Civil War film Call Black Horse starring Casey Affleck, which entered the early stages of development. In 2018, she revealed she had started writing a script that she describes as an "epic environmental horror". In November 2020, it was announced Ramsay would be filming an adaptation of Stephen King's 1999 novel The Girl Who Loved Tom Gordon. The movie is co-written by Christy Hall, who co-created the Netflix series I Am Not Okay With This, and produced by Christine Romero and Roy Lee of Vertigo Entertainment among others.

In 2019 Ramsay was commissioned for a short documentary on Brigitte Lacombe and her sister Marian by fashion brand Miu Miu as part of its Women's Tales series. Ramsay said of the film that it reflected her own complex relationship with her sister.

=== 2020–present: Die My Love and upcoming work ===
At the Valencia International Film Festival in 2021, Ramsay revealed that she was working on another movie with Joaquin Phoenix called Polaris, co-starring Rooney Mara. In a 2024 interview, Ramsay described the movie as "Rosemary's Baby in the Arctic". In a 2025 interview, Ramsay shared more information on her "passion project": It will be set in Alaska in 1910 and feature music by long-time collaborator Jonny Greenwood. More information followed in a 2026 interview: The film is about a photographer who meets the devil in the arctic. She further called it "my 2001."

In May 2022, Ramsay announced that she was working on a film adaptation of Margaret Atwood's "Stone Mattress". The film, which was set to star Julianne Moore, Sandra Oh and Kyle Chandler, was picked up by Amazon Studios. Ramsay says about the movie "regarding the overturning of Roe v Wade in America this story [...] feels more important than ever." The movie was to be set in Greenland. In a 2025 interview with the Los Angeles Times Ramsay shared the final fate of the project: After she pushed back against producers demanding Iceland as the filming location, the project was indefinitely put on hold. After the success of Die My Love at the 2025 Cannes Film Festival Ramsay has again floated the possibility of Stone Mattress being finished in a 2026 interview, describing it as an "environmental revenge film" and sharing that she has produced a detailed visual deck for the project.

In November 2022, it was announced that Ramsay would be directing an adaptation of Ariana Harwicz’s novel Die, My Love, which would be produced by Martin Scorsese and Jennifer Lawrence through Excellent Cadaver. Lawrence would additionally star as a woman who is driven to insanity by her marriage and childbirth. Ramsay said that Lawrence sent her a copy of the book, which is about postpartum depression and bipolar disorder, noting that the film itself would be funny, and that the movie would "probably" be her next film after the 2023 Hollywood strikes. The first draft of the screenplay was written by Irish playwright Enda Walsh. In July 2024, Robert Pattinson entered talks to join the film. In August 2024, cinematographer Seamus McGarvey spoke about reuniting with Ramsay on the film, including citing Repulsion (1965) and Rosemary's Baby (1968) as influences for the film. Later that month, LaKeith Stanfield, Sissy Spacek, and Nick Nolte joined the cast, during which the project began filming in Calgary. The film premiered at the 2025 Cannes Film Festival in competition for the Golden Palm, the festival's main prize. While it didn't win, it received a six-minute standing ovation and was acquired by Mubi for $24 million, finally leading to her signing with Creative Artists Agency. Shortly after the premiere Ramsay spoke out against critics minimizing the film's central conflict under the diagnosis of postpartum depression. In a 2026 interview with The Gentlewoman, Ramsay voiced her wish to do a new cut of Die My Love after a rushed editing process due to domestic obligations, budgetary time constraints, and the passing of Ramsay's mother shortly before the premiere of the film.

In 2024, Variety reported that Ramsay was writing yet another script with Townend, titled Hierarchies. No additional information about the scope of the project was released. In a May 2025 interview at Cannes, Ramsay announced work on a vampire film starring Ezra Miller. Miller later shared that they are co-writing the script for the movie.

== Project disputes ==
=== The Lovely Bones ===
In 2001, it was announced Ramsay was slated to direct the adaptation of Alice Sebold's The Lovely Bones, which she had read in manuscript form prior to the book's publication. Ramsay's script told the story of the murder of a girl from her father's perspective. Shortly after, the book turned into a global bestseller resulting in more pressure. Ramsay has said in interviews: "People started to call it The Lovely Money, they were getting greedy around it. And I could feel the vibes. It became like the Holy Bible, I kept handing in drafts and I thought they were good, but it was like ‘But that's not exactly like the book, the book's going to be a success.’ That was the mistake they made with the project." Then Film4, which had signed her onto the project, was massively downsized and the head of the company ultimately replaced Ramsay with Peter Jackson in 2004, when Jackson was fresh off The Lord of The Rings saga. Ramsay has later described this confrontation with the film industry as a "David and Goliath situation".

The loss of The Lovely Bones hurt Ramsay's self-confidence for a while, and the following year was made even more difficult for Ramsay, as both her father and her close friend, Liana Dognini, died. Dognini had been Ramsay's co-writer on Morvern Callar and the unrealized The Lovely Bones script.

=== Jane Got a Gun ===
In 2012, Ramsay was slated to direct Jane Got a Gun, a movie about the farmer wife of an outlaw husband, who, after his gang turns on him, must defend herself with the help of an old lover. Natalie Portman signed on to star and produce the film. In March 2013, Ramsay abruptly left the project on the first day of shooting due to creative differences with producers and funders, including over the latter's demand for a happy ending. She was replaced by Gavin O'Connor. Actor Jude Law also left the production shortly after. In November 2013, news broke that the production company behind the movie was suing Ramsay for $750,000, claiming that she had not fulfilled her contractual obligations and that she "was repeatedly under the influence of alcohol, was abusive to members of the cast and crew, and was generally disruptive". Ramsay denied the allegations in a statement made shortly after. A year after parting ways, the lawsuit was resolved out of court. The public aspect of the dispute caused significant backlash against Ramsay.

== Artistry ==
In 1999, before the release of Ratcatcher, she cited Nan Goldin, Richard Billingham, Terrence Malick, Andrei Tarkovsky and John Cassavetes as her creative mentors. In that same interview, she spoke about Robert Bresson's book Notes on the Cinematographer as "a little bible [...] in film school." Ramsay has also noted Rainer Werner Fassbinder's Fear Eats the Soul, David Lynch's Blue Velvet and Ingmar Bergman's The Virgin Spring as deeply moving movie-going experiences. In 2025 Ramsay named contemporaries Jonathan Glazer and Paul Thomas Anderson among her favorite filmmakers.

Ramsay's films explore themes of death, rebirth, childhood, loss of innocence, alienation, guilt and memory. Many of her movies also deal with grief and its aftermath.

Los Angeles Times columnist Mark Olsen considered Ramsay "one of the leading lights of young British cinema", describing her additionally as "among the most celebrated British filmmakers of her generation." The Harvard Film Archive describes Ramsay as "an uncompromising filmmaker fascinated by the tremendous power of cinema to appeal directly to the senses and awaken new depths in our audio-visual imagination. Immersive and at times almost overwhelming, Ramsay's films abound with uncommon imagery arresting for its remarkable use of texture, composition, color, music and sound." British film critic Jonathan Romney, wrote on the topic of We Need to Talk About Kevin, "Ramsay thinks not in concepts but in images. She doesn't make intellectual films, but ones that are close to music, taking visuals to the point of abstraction."

In 2007, Ramsay was rated number 12 in Guardian Unlimited's list of the world's 40 best directors working at the time.

== Personal life ==
Ramsay was previously married to writer and musician Rory Stewart Kinnear (not to be confused with actor Rory Kinnear), though their marriage and divorce dates are unknown. Following the divorce, she spent four years in Greece, where she lived in Santorini and gave birth to her daughter in Athens. Her daughter's godparents are We Need to Talk About Kevin stars Tilda Swinton and John C. Reilly.

Ramsay's niece, Lynne Ramsay Jr, starred in multiple roles in her early films.

== Filmography ==
Short film

Year	Title	Director	Writer	Producer	Notes	Ref.
1996	Small Deaths	Yes	Yes	No	Also cinematographer	
1997	Kill the Day	Yes	Yes	No		
1998	Gasman	Yes	Yes	No		
2012	Swimmer	Yes	No	Executive		
2019	Brigitte	Yes	Yes	Yes	Documentary	

Feature film

Year	Title	Director	Writer	Producer	Ref.
1999	Ratcatcher	Yes	Yes	No	
2002	Morvern Callar	Yes	Yes	No	
2011	We Need to Talk About Kevin	Yes	Yes	Executive	
2017	You Were Never Really Here	Yes	Yes	Yes	
2025	Die My Love	Yes	Yes	Executive	

Music video

Year	Title	Artist	Ref.
2005	"Black and White Town"	Doves	

== Awards and recognition ==
On 8 October 2013, Ramsay was awarded an honorary doctorate by the University of Edinburgh for her contribution to British cinema. In 2026 Ramsay was announced as that year's recipient of the Glasgow Film Festival's Cinema City Honorary Award joining the ranks of Viggo Mortensen and James McAvoy.

=== Critical response ===
Year	Film	Rotten Tomatoes	Metacritic
1999	Ratcatcher	85% (47 reviews)	78 (21 reviews)
2002	Morvern Callar	85% (87 reviews)	78 (24 reviews)
2011	We Need to Talk About Kevin	74% (208 reviews)	68 (37 reviews)
2017	You Were Never Really Here	89% (289 reviews)	84 (41 reviews)
2025	Die My Love	74% (219 reviews)	72 (51 reviews)

== See also ==
- List of British film directors
- List of Scottish film directors
- List of female film and television directors
- Women's cinema
