= List of awards and nominations received by Chiwetel Ejiofor =

Chiwetel Ejiofor awards and nominations
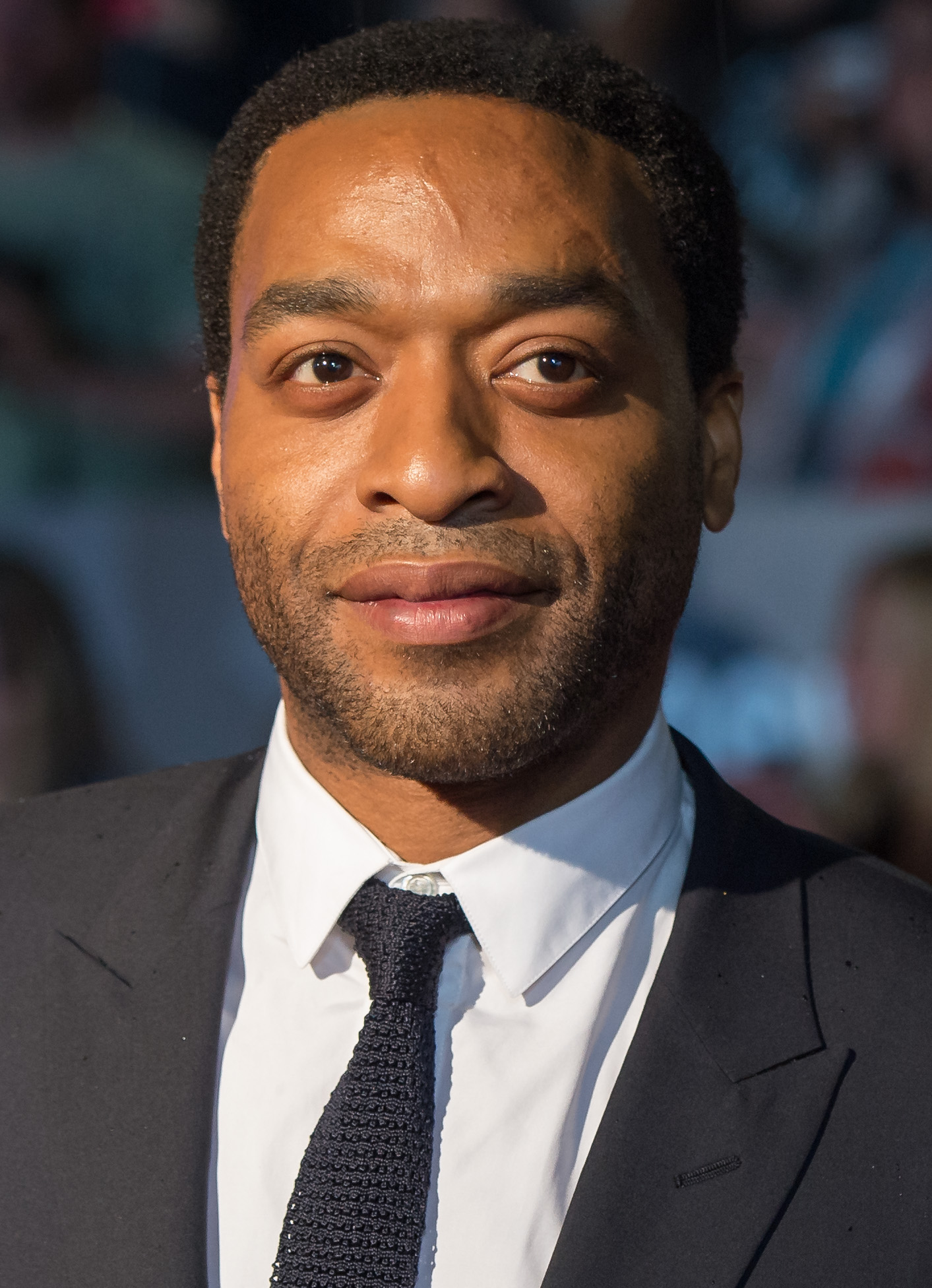
- Ejiofor at the 2015 Toronto International Film Festival
Awards and nominations
Award	Wins	Nominations
Academy Awards	0	1
British Academy Film Awards	1	2
Golden Globe Awards	0	5
Primetime Emmy Awards	0	2
Screen Actors Guild Awards	0	3

Totals (Note: Certain award groups do not simply award one winner. They acknowledge several different recipients, have runners-up, and have third place. Since this is a specific recognition and is different from losing an award, runner-up mentions are considered wins in this award tally. For simplification and to avoid errors, each award in this list has been presumed to have had a prior nomination.)
- Wins: 53
- Nominations: 118

Chiwetel Ejiofor is a British actor and filmmaker who has received various awards and nominations, including a British Academy Film Award and a Laurence Olivier Award. He has received additional nominations for one Academy Award, one British Film Academy Award, five Golden Globe Awards, two Primetime Emmy Awards, and three Screen Actors Guild Awards.

For his performance in the British play Blue/Orange in 2000, Ejiofor received a Critics' Circle Theatre Award, an Evening Standard Theatre Award, and a nomination for the Laurence Olivier Award for Best Actor in a Supporting Role. In 2002, he starred in the social thriller film Dirty Pretty Things, leading to Best Actor awards at the British Independent Film Awards and the Evening Standard British Film Awards. He was nominated for the inaugural BAFTA Rising Star Award in 2006. At the 64th Golden Globe Awards, the following year, Ejiofor was nominated for his performances in Kinky Boots and the television miniseries Tsunami: The Aftermath. In 2008, he received the Laurence Olivier Award for Best Actor and a Critics' Circle Theatre Award for playing the title character in Othello, and he was awarded an OBE by Queen Elizabeth II for services to drama. At the 67th Golden Globe Awards, he received a nomination for Best Actor in a Miniseries or Motion Picture Made for Television for playing South African politician Thabo Mbeki in Endgame (2009).

Ejiofor received numerous accolades for playing American abolitionist Solomon Northup in the 2013 biographical period drama film 12 Years a Slave. He received the BAFTA Award for Best Actor in a Leading Role and was nominated for the Academy Award for Best Actor. Additionally, he won Best Actor awards at the 3rd AACTA International Awards and the 14th BET Awards, and was nominated at the 71st Golden Globe Awards, the 20th Screen Actors Guild Awards, the 19th Critics' Choice Awards, and the 18th Satellite Awards. In 2013, he also starred in the BBC television drama Dancing on the Edge, for which he was nominated for a Golden Globe Award, a Primetime Emmy Award, and a Satellite Award. Ejiofor was awarded a CBE in 2015.

Ejiofor's feature directorial debut, The Boy Who Harnessed the Wind, earned him the Alfred P. Sloan Prize at the 2019 Sundance Film Festival. He was nominated for Outstanding Narrator at the 72nd Primetime Emmy Awards for narrating the documentary The Elephant Queen.

== Awards and nominations ==
Awards and nominations received by Chiwetel Ejiofor
Award	Year (Note: Indicates the year of ceremony. Each year is linked to the article about the awards held that year, wherever possible.)	Work	Category	Result	Ref.
AACTA International Awards	2014	12 Years a Slave	Best Actor	Won	
Academy Awards	2014	12 Years a Slave	Best Actor	Nominated	
African-American Film Critics Association Awards	2007	American Gangster	Best Supporting Actor	Won	
Alliance of Women Film Journalists Awards	2013	12 Years a Slave	Best Actor	Nominated	
Alliance of Women Film Journalists Awards	2013	12 Years a Slave	Best Ensemble Cast (Note: Shared with the cast of 12 Years a Slave)	Nominated	
Alliance of Women Film Journalists Awards	2013	12 Years a Slave	Unforgettable Moment Award (Note: Received for the "Solomon hanging" scene)	Won	
American Black Film Festival Awards	2004	Dirty Pretty Things	Best Performance by an Actor	Won	
Austin Film Critics Association Awards	2013	12 Years a Slave	Best Actor	Won	
BET Awards	2014	12 Years a Slave	Best Actor	Won	
Black Reel Awards	2004	Dirty Pretty Things	Outstanding Actor	Won	
Black Reel Awards	2006	Serenity	Outstanding Supporting Actor	Nominated	
Black Reel Awards	2007	Children of Men	Outstanding Supporting Actor	Nominated	
Black Reel Awards	2007	Kinky Boots	Outstanding Supporting Actor	Nominated	
Black Reel Awards	2008	Redbelt	Outstanding Actor	Nominated	
Black Reel Awards	2010	2012	Outstanding Supporting Actor	Nominated	
Black Reel Awards	2014	12 Years a Slave	Outstanding Actor	Won	
Black Reel Awards	2014	12 Years a Slave	Outstanding Ensemble	Won	
Black Reel Awards	2014	Dancing on the Edge	Outstanding Actor in a Television Movie or Limited Series	Won	
Black Reel Awards	2016	The Martian	Outstanding Supporting Actor	Nominated	
Black Reel Awards	2016	Z for Zachariah	Outstanding Actor	Nominated	
Black Reel Awards	2020	The Boy Who Harnessed the Wind	Outstanding First Screenplay	Nominated	
Black Reel Awards	2020	The Lion King	Outstanding Voice Performance	Won	
Boston Society of Film Critics Awards	2013	12 Years a Slave	Best Actor	Won	
British Academy Film Awards	2006	—N/a	Rising Star Award	Nominated	
British Academy Film Awards	2014	12 Years a Slave	Best Actor in a Leading Role	Won	
British Independent Film Awards	2003	Dirty Pretty Things	Best Actor	Won	
British Independent Film Awards	2003	Dirty Pretty Things	Most Promising Newcomer	Nominated	
British Independent Film Awards	2005	Kinky Boots	Best Actor	Nominated	
British Independent Film Awards	2015	—N/a	Richard Harris Award	Won	
British Independent Film Awards	2019	The Boy Who Harnessed the Wind	Best Supporting Actor	Nominated	
British Independent Film Awards	2019	The Boy Who Harnessed the Wind	Douglas Hickox Award (Debut Director)	Nominated	
Broadcasting Press Guild Awards	2014	Dancing on the Edge	Best Actor	Won	
Chicago Film Critics Association Awards	2004	Dirty Pretty Things	Most Promising Performer	Nominated	
Chicago Film Critics Association Awards	2013	12 Years a Slave	Best Actor	Won	
Critics' Choice Documentary Awards	2019	The Elephant Queen	Best Narration (Note: Shared with The Elephant Queen writer Mark Deeble)	Nominated	
Critics' Choice Movie Awards	2014	12 Years a Slave	Best Acting Ensemble	Nominated	
Critics' Choice Movie Awards	2014	12 Years a Slave	Best Actor	Nominated	
Critics' Choice Super Awards	2021	The Old Guard	Best Actor in a Superhero Movie	Nominated	
Critics' Choice Super Awards	2026	Backrooms	Best Actor in a Horror Movie	Nominated	
Critics' Choice Television Awards	2014	Dancing on the Edge	Best Actor in a Movie or Miniseries	Nominated	
Critics' Circle Theatre Awards	2001	Blue/Orange	Jack Tinker Award for Most Promising Newcomer	Won	
Critics' Circle Theatre Awards	2008	Othello	John and Wendy Trewin Award for Best Shakespearean Performance (Note: Tied with Patrick Stewart for Macbeth)	Won	
Dallas-Fort Worth Film Critics Association Awards	2013	12 Years a Slave	Best Actor	Runner-up	
Detroit Film Critics Society Awards	2013	12 Years a Slave	Best Actor	Nominated	
Detroit Film Critics Society Awards	2013	12 Years a Slave	Best Ensemble	Nominated	
Dorian Awards	2014	12 Years a Slave	Film Performance of the Year – Actor	Nominated	
Dublin Film Critics' Circle Awards	2014	12 Years a Slave	Best Actor (Note: Tied with Bill Hader for The Skeleton Twins (2014), Tom Hardy for Locke (2013), and Joaquin Phoenix for Her (2013))	10th place	
Empire Awards	2014	12 Years a Slave	Best Actor	Nominated	
European Film Awards	2003	Dirty Pretty Things	Best Actor	Nominated	
Evening Standard British Film Awards	2003	Dirty Pretty Things	Best Actor	Won	
Evening Standard British Film Awards	2017	Doctor Strange	Best Supporting Actor	Nominated	
Evening Standard Theatre Awards	2000	Blue/Orange	Outstanding Newcomer	Won	
Florida Film Critics Circle Awards	2013	12 Years a Slave	Best Actor	Won	
Georgia Film Critics Association Awards	2014	12 Years a Slave	Best Actor	Won	
Georgia Film Critics Association Awards	2014	12 Years a Slave	Best Ensemble	Nominated	
Golden Globe Awards	2007	Kinky Boots	Best Actor in a Motion Picture – Musical or Comedy	Nominated	
Golden Globe Awards	2007	Tsunami: The Aftermath	Best Actor in a Miniseries or Motion Picture Made for Television	Nominated	
Golden Globe Awards	2010	Endgame	Best Actor in a Miniseries or Motion Picture Made for Television	Nominated	
Golden Globe Awards	2014	12 Years a Slave	Best Actor in a Motion Picture – Drama	Nominated	
Golden Globe Awards	2014	Dancing on the Edge	Best Actor in a Miniseries or Motion Picture Made for Television	Nominated	
Gotham Awards	2007	Talk to Me	Best Ensemble Cast (Note: Tied with the cast of Before the Devil Knows You're Dead (2007))	Won	
Gotham Awards	2013	12 Years a Slave	Best Actor	Nominated	
Houston Film Critics Society Awards	2013	12 Years a Slave	Best Actor	Won	
Ian Charleson Awards	2000	Romeo and Juliet	—N/a	Nominated	
IFTA Film & Drama Awards	2014	12 Years a Slave	Best International Actor	Won	
Independent Spirit Awards	2008	Talk to Me	Best Supporting Male	Won	
Independent Spirit Awards	2014	12 Years a Slave	Best Male Lead	Nominated	
IndieWire Critics Poll Awards	2013	12 Years a Slave	Best Lead Performance	Won	
International Cinephile Society Awards	2014	12 Years a Slave	Best Actor	Nominated	
International Cinephile Society Awards	2014	12 Years a Slave	Best Ensemble	Nominated	
Laurence Olivier Awards	2001	Blue/Orange	Best Actor in a Supporting Role	Nominated	
Laurence Olivier Awards	2008	Othello	Best Actor	Won	
London Film Critics' Circle Awards	2003	Dirty Pretty Things	British Actor of the Year	Nominated	
London Film Critics' Circle Awards	2006	Kinky Boots	British Actor of the Year	Nominated	
London Film Critics' Circle Awards	2014	12 Years a Slave	Actor of the Year	Won	
London Film Critics' Circle Awards	2014	12 Years a Slave	British Actor of the Year	Nominated	
Los Angeles Film Critics Association Awards	2013	12 Years a Slave	Best Actor	Runner-up	
Mill Valley Film Festival Awards	2013	12 Years a Slave	MVFF Award (Note: Also presented to 12 Years a Slave director Steve McQueen)	Won	
Monte-Carlo Television Festival Awards	2007	Tsunami: The Aftermath	Best Performance by an Actor in a Miniseries	Won	
MTV Movie Awards	2014	12 Years a Slave	Best Male Performance	Nominated	
NAACP Image Awards	2007	Tsunami: The Aftermath	Outstanding Actor in a Television Movie, Mini-Series or Dramatic Special	Nominated	
NAACP Image Awards	2008	Talk to Me	Outstanding Supporting Actor in a Motion Picture	Nominated	
NAACP Image Awards	2010	2012	Outstanding Supporting Actor in a Motion Picture	Nominated	
NAACP Image Awards	2014	12 Years a Slave	Outstanding Actor in a Motion Picture	Nominated	
NAACP Image Awards	2014	Dancing on the Edge	Outstanding Actor in a Television Movie, Mini-Series or Dramatic Special	Nominated	
NAACP Image Awards	2016	The Martian	Outstanding Supporting Actor in a Motion Picture	Nominated	
NAACP Image Awards	2016	Secret in Their Eyes	Outstanding Actor in a Motion Picture	Nominated	
NAACP Image Awards	2020	The Boy Who Harnessed the Wind	Outstanding Directing in a Motion Picture	Won	
National Society of Film Critics Awards	2014	12 Years a Slave	Best Actor	Runner-up	
New York Film Critics Circle Awards	2013	12 Years a Slave	Best Actor	Nominated	
New York Film Critics Online Awards	2013	12 Years a Slave	Best Actor	Won	
Newport Beach Film Festival Awards	2020	12 Years a Slave	Artist of Distinction	Won	
Nigeria Entertainment Awards	2014	Half of a Yellow Sun	Best Actor in a Lead Role	Nominated	
Nigeria Entertainment Awards	2015	—N/a	Actor of the Year (Nigeria in Hollywood)	Won	
Online Film Critics Society Awards	2004	Dirty Pretty Things	Best Breakthrough Performance	Nominated	
Online Film Critics Society Awards	2013	12 Years a Slave	Best Actor	Won	
Primetime Emmy Awards	2014	Dancing on the Edge	Outstanding Lead Actor in a Miniseries or a Movie	Nominated	
Primetime Emmy Awards	2020	The Elephant Queen	Outstanding Narrator	Nominated	
San Diego Film Critics Society Awards	2003	Dirty Pretty Things	Best Actor	Won	
San Diego Film Critics Society Awards	2013	12 Years a Slave	Best Actor	Nominated	
San Diego Film Critics Society Awards	2013	12 Years a Slave	Best Performance by an Ensemble	Nominated	
San Francisco Film Critics Circle Awards	2013	12 Years a Slave	Best Actor	Won	
Satellite Awards	2014	12 Years a Slave	Best Actor in a Motion Picture	Nominated	
Satellite Awards	2014	Dancing on the Edge	Best Actor in a Miniseries or a Motion Picture Made for Television	Nominated	
Saturn Awards	2022	The Man Who Fell to Earth	Best Actor in a Network or Cable Television Series	Nominated	
Screen Actors Guild Awards	2008	American Gangster	Outstanding Performance by a Cast in a Motion Picture (Note: Shared with the cast of American Gangster)	Nominated	
Screen Actors Guild Awards	2014	12 Years a Slave	Outstanding Performance by a Cast in a Motion Picture	Nominated	
Screen Actors Guild Awards	2014	12 Years a Slave	Outstanding Performance by a Male Actor in a Leading Role	Nominated	
Screen Nation Film and Television Awards	2003	Dirty Pretty Things	Best Male Performance in Film	Won	
Screen Nation Film and Television Awards	2014	12 Years a Slave	Best Male Performance in Film	Won	
St. Louis Film Critics Association Awards	2013	12 Years a Slave	Best Actor	Won	
Sundance Film Festival Awards	2019	The Boy Who Harnessed the Wind	Alfred P. Sloan Prize	Won	
Toronto Film Critics Association Awards	2013	12 Years a Slave	Best Actor (Note: Tied with Matthew McConaughey for Dallas Buyers Club (2013))	Runner-up	
Vancouver Film Critics Circle Awards	2014	12 Years a Slave	Best Actor	Nominated	
Village Voice Film Poll Awards	2013	12 Years a Slave	Best Actor	Won	
Washington D.C. Area Film Critics Association Awards	2013	12 Years a Slave	Best Actor	Won	
Washington D.C. Area Film Critics Association Awards	2013	12 Years a Slave	Best Acting Ensemble	Won	
Women Film Critics Circle Awards	2013	12 Years a Slave	Best Actor	Won	
Women Film Critics Circle Awards	2013	12 Years a Slave	Best Male Images in a Movie	Won	
