= British Independent Film Awards 2000 =

British awards ceremony

3rd British Independent Film Awards
- Awarded for: Best in British independent film
- Date: 25 October 2000
- Site: Café Royal, London
- Hosted by: Richard Blackwood
- Official website: www.bifa.film

Highlights
- Best Film: Billy Elliot
- Most awards: Billy Elliot (4)
- Most nominations: Billy Elliot (5)

The third British Independent Film Awards were held on 25 October 2000 to recognise the best in British independent cinema and filmmaking talent from United Kingdom.

As per previous years, only films intended for theatrical release, and those which had a public screening to a paying audience either on general release in the UK or at a British film festival between 1 October 1999 and 30 September 2000 were eligible for consideration. In addition, they needed to have been produced or majority co-produced by a British company, or in receipt of at least 51% of their budget from a British source. Lastly, they could not be solely funded by a single studio.

Nominations were announced in early October 2000. The award ceremony, hosted by Richard Blackwood, was held later that same month and for the third year in succession at the Café Royal, in London's West End. Winners in eleven categories were selected from the shortlists and a further three were awarded entirely at the jury's discretion, whose make up included Andy Paterson, Ayub Khan Din, Declan Lowney, Duncan Heath, Fiona Mitchell, Michele Camarda, Richard Holmes, Rupert Preston and Samantha Morton.

== Winners and nominees ==
Best British Independent Film	Best Director
Billy Elliot – Stephen Daldry; Last Resort – Paweł Pawlikowski; One Day in September – Kevin Macdonald; Saving Grace – Nigel Cole; The House of Mirth – Terence Davies	Stephen Daldry – Billy Elliot; Nigel Cole – Saving Grace; Terence Davies – The House of Mirth; Mike Leigh – Topsy-Turvy; Paul Pawlikowski – Last Resort
Best Actor	Best Actress
Daniel Craig – Some Voices as Ray; Paul Bettany – Gangster No. 1 as Young Gangster; Jim Broadbent – Topsy-Turvy as W. S. Gilbert; Adrian Lester – Love's Labours Lost as Dumaine; Peter Mullan – Miss Julie as Jean	Gillian Anderson – The House of Mirth as Lily Bart; Kate Ashfield – The Low Down as Ruby; Brenda Blethyn – Saving Grace as Grace Trevethyn; Julie Walters – Billy Elliot as Sandra Wilkinson (Note: Archived websites of the time including the BBC, Screen Daily, Variety and BIFA itself list Julie Walters as a nominee. The current (2004) BIFA website erroneously omits her.); Emily Watson – The Luzhin Defence as Natalia Katkov
Most Promising Newcomer (off screen)	Most Promising Newcomer (on screen)
Justine Wright – One Day in September (Film editor); Damien Bromley – Going Off Big Time (Director of Photography); Alison Domintz – Hotel Splendide (Production designer); Igor Jadue-Lillo – The Low Down (Director of Photography); Courtney Pine – It Was an Accident (Musical score)	Jamie Bell – Billy Elliot as Billy Elliot; Chris Beattie and Greg McLane (Note: The committee decided to offer a shared nomination to Chris Beattie and Greg McLane) – Purely Belter as Gerry McCarten and Sewell; Neil Fitzmaurice – Going Off Big Time as Mark Clayton; Dina Korzun – Last Resort as Tanya; Lewis MacKenzie – There's Only One Jimmy Grimble as Jimmy Grimble
Best International Independent Film (English Language)	Best International Independent Film (Foreign Language)
The Straight Story – David Lynch; Boiler Room – Ben Younger; Chuck & Buck – Miguel Arteta; Jesus' Son – Alison Maclean; Nurse Betty – Neil LaBute	Kadosh – Amos Gitai; Beau Travail – Claire Denis; The Emperor and the Assassin – Chen Kaige; Those Who Love Me Can Take the Train – Patrice Chéreau; Une Liaison Pornographique – Frédéric Fonteyne
Douglas Hickox Award (Best Debut Director)	Best Achievement in Production
Kevin MacDonald – One Day in September; Jim Doyle – Going Off Big Time; Ben Hopkins – Simon Magus; Julian Nott – Weak at Denise; Jamie Thraves – The Low Down	Karen Smyth and Owen Thomas – One Life Stand; Norma Heyman and Jonathan Cavendish – Gangster No. 1; Michael Blakey and Ian Brady – Going Off Big Time; Paul Goodman – It Was an Accident; Simon Channing Williams – Topsy-Turvy
Best Screenplay	Producer of the Year
Lee Hall – Billy Elliot; Craig Ferguson and Mark Crowdey – Saving Grace; Johnny Ferguson – Gangster No. 1; Mark Herman – Purely Belter; Paul Pawlikowski and Rowan Joffe – Last Resort	Andrew Eaton
Special Jury Prize	Lifetime Achievement Award
Mike Figgis	Colin Young

=== Films with multiple nominations ===
Nominations	Film
5	Billy Elliott
4	Saving Grace
4	Last Resort
4	Going Off Big Time
3	One Day in September
3	The House of Mirth
3	Topsy-Turvy
3	Gangster No. 1
3	The Low Down
2	It Was an Accident
2	Purely Belter
