= British Independent Film Award for Best Performance by an Actor in a British Independent Film =

Film award category

British Independent Film Award for Best Actor
- Awarded for: Best Performance by an Actor in a British Independent Film
- Country: United Kingdom
- Presented by: BIFA
- First award: 1998
- Final award: 2021
- Currently held by: Adeel Akhtar – Ali & Ava (2021)
- Website: www.bifa.org.uk

The British Independent Film Award for Best Performance by an Actor in a British Independent Film was an annual award given by the British Independent Film Awards (BIFA) to recognize the best lead performance by an actor in a British independent film. The award was first presented in the 1998 ceremony with Ray Winstone being the first recipient of the award for his performance as Raymond in Nil by Mouth.

Actors Michael Fassbender, Tom Hardy and Josh O'Connor are the only nominees who have won the award twice while Riz Ahmed holds the record of most nominations in this category with five nominations.

In July 2022, it was announced that the performance categories would be replaced with gender-neutral categories, with both Best Actor and Best Actress merging into the Best Lead Performance category. Additionally, a category named Best Joint Lead Performance was created for "two (or exceptionally three) performances that are the joint focus of the film, especially where performances share a large number of scenes and screen time".

== Winners and nominees ==
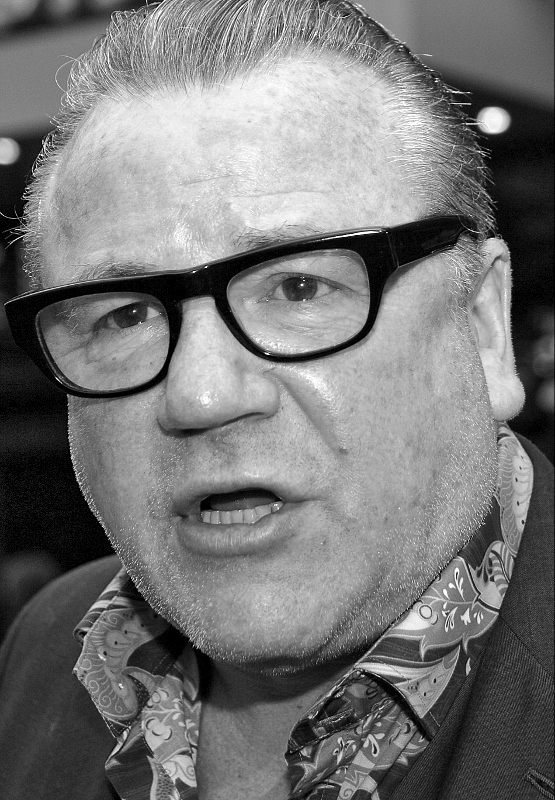
Ray Winstone won for Nil by Mouth (1998).

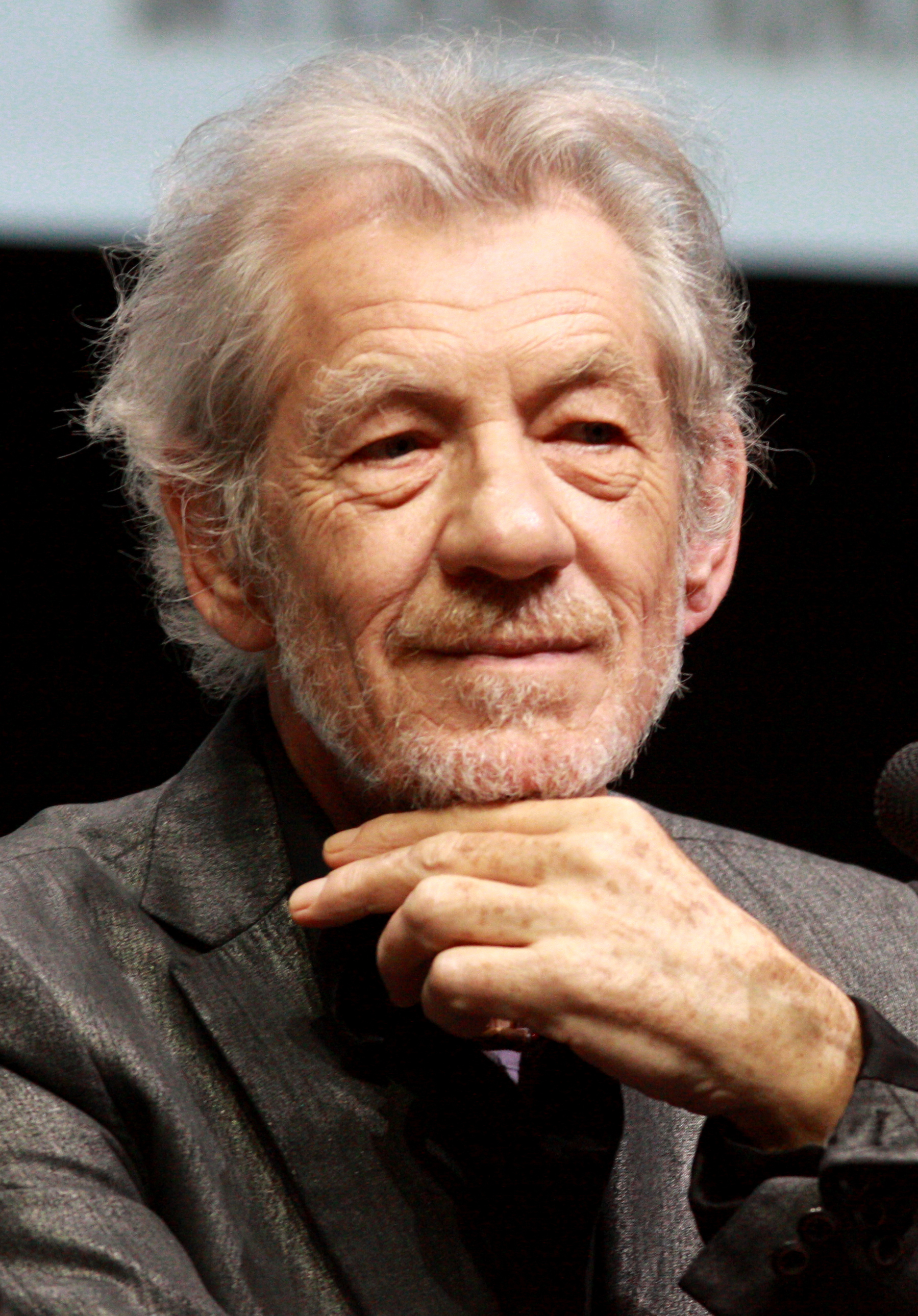
Ian McKellen won for Gods and Monsters (1999).

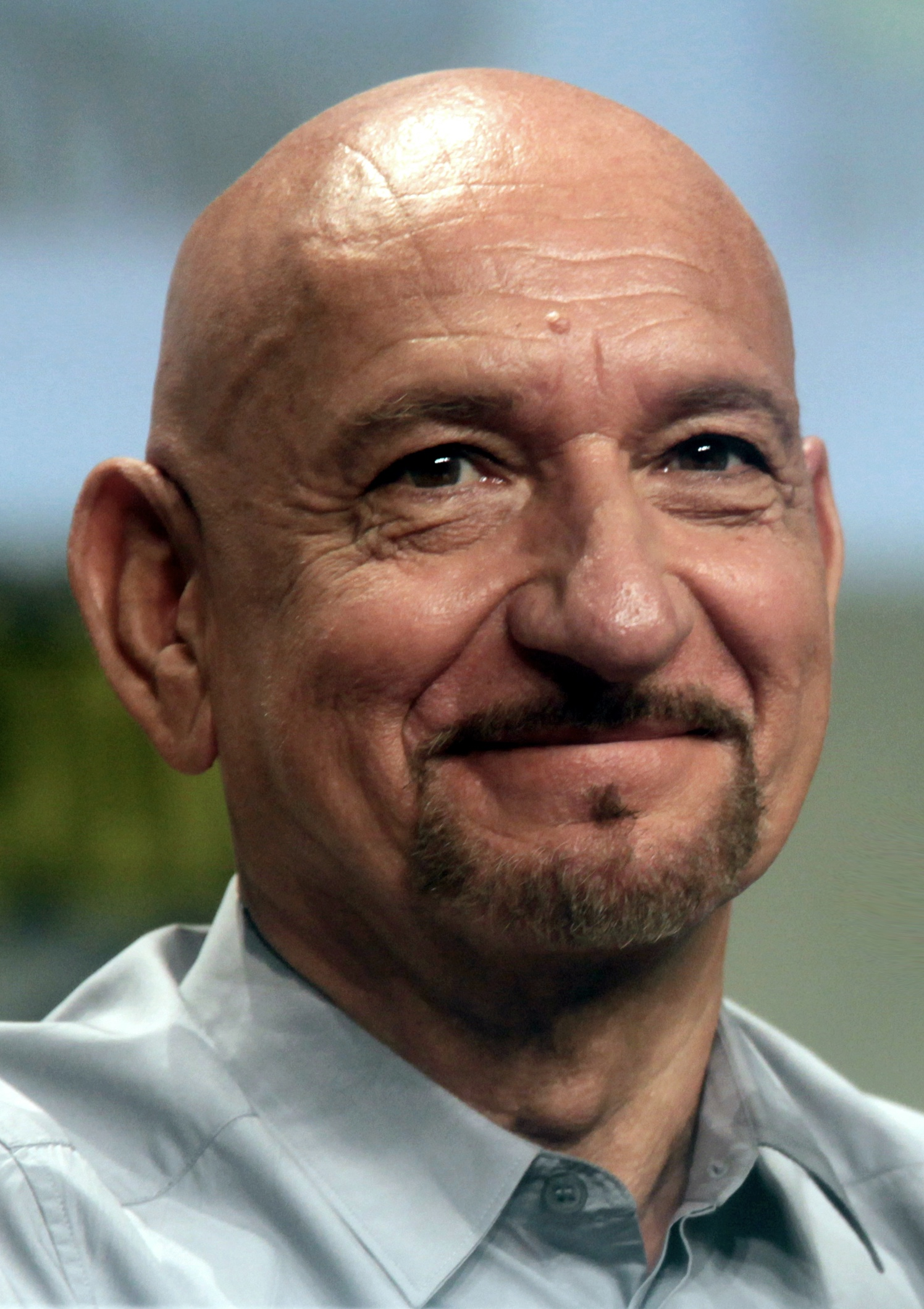
Ben Kingsley won for Sexy Beast (2001).

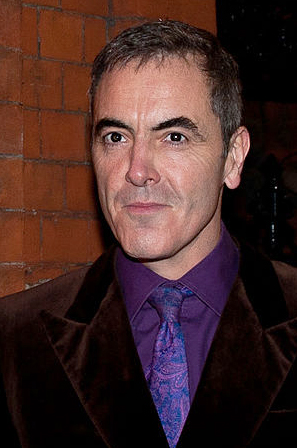
James Nesbitt won for Bloody Sunday (2002).

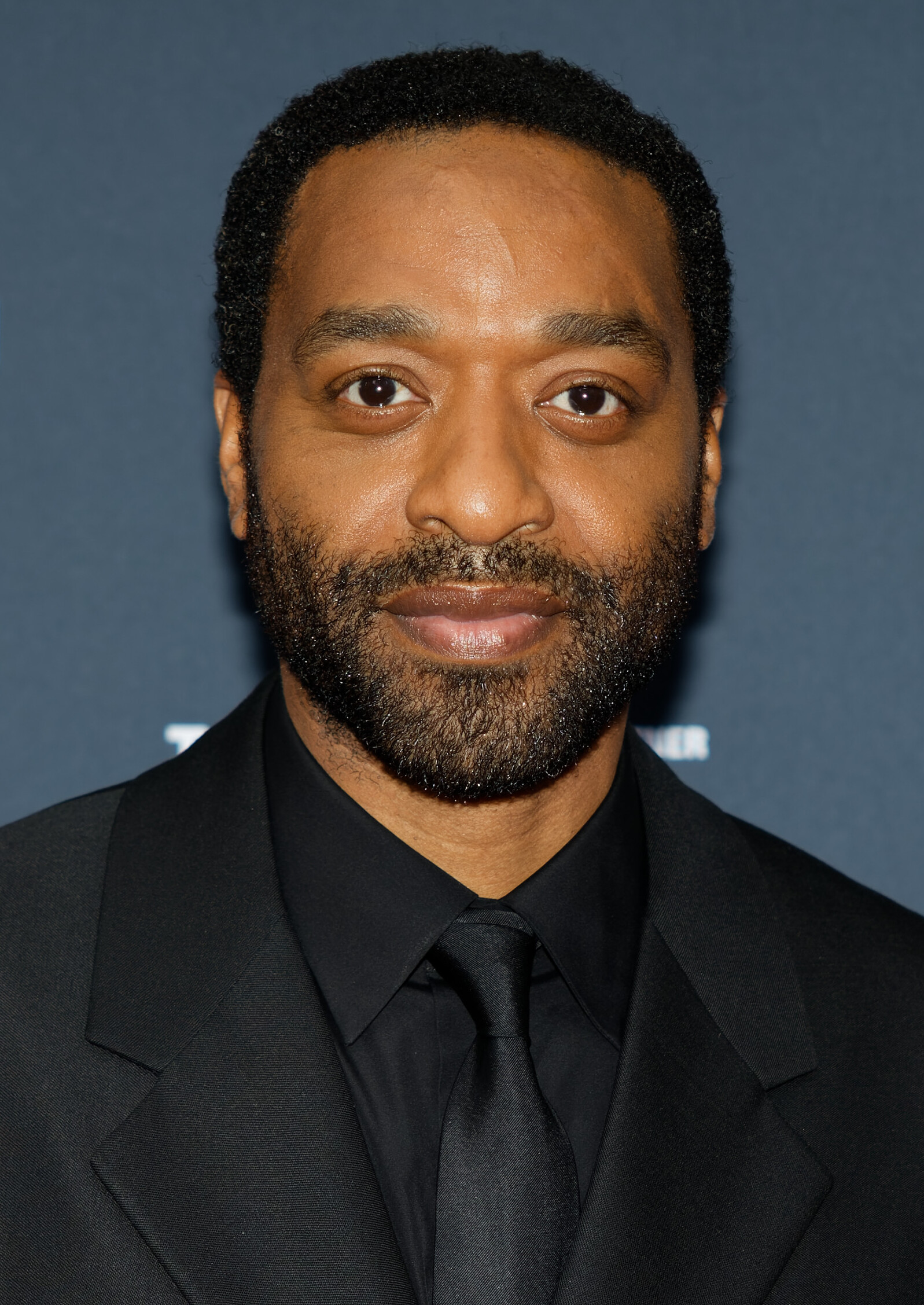
Chiwetel Ejiofor won for Dirty Pretty Things (2003).

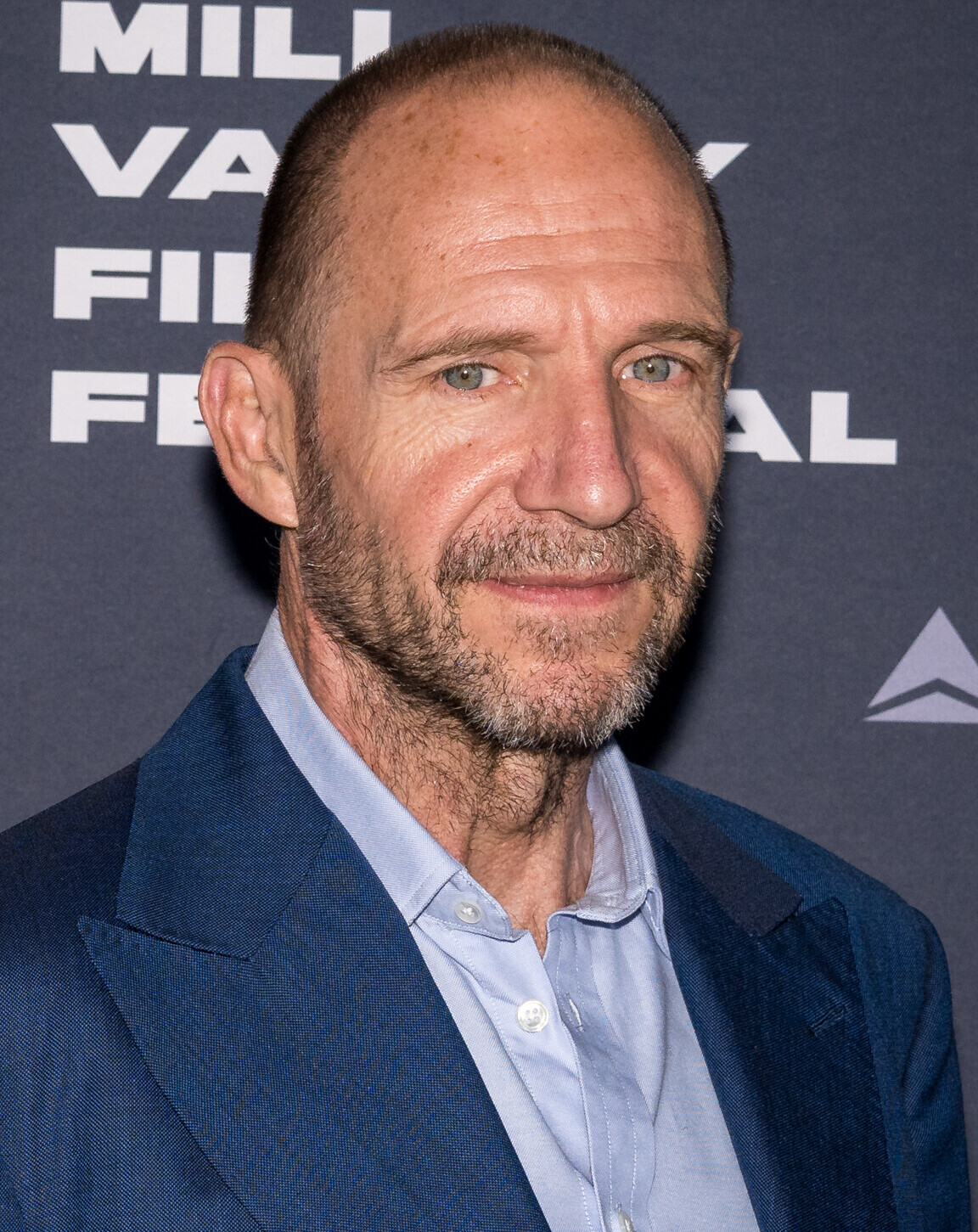
Ralph Fiennes won for The Constant Gardener (2005).

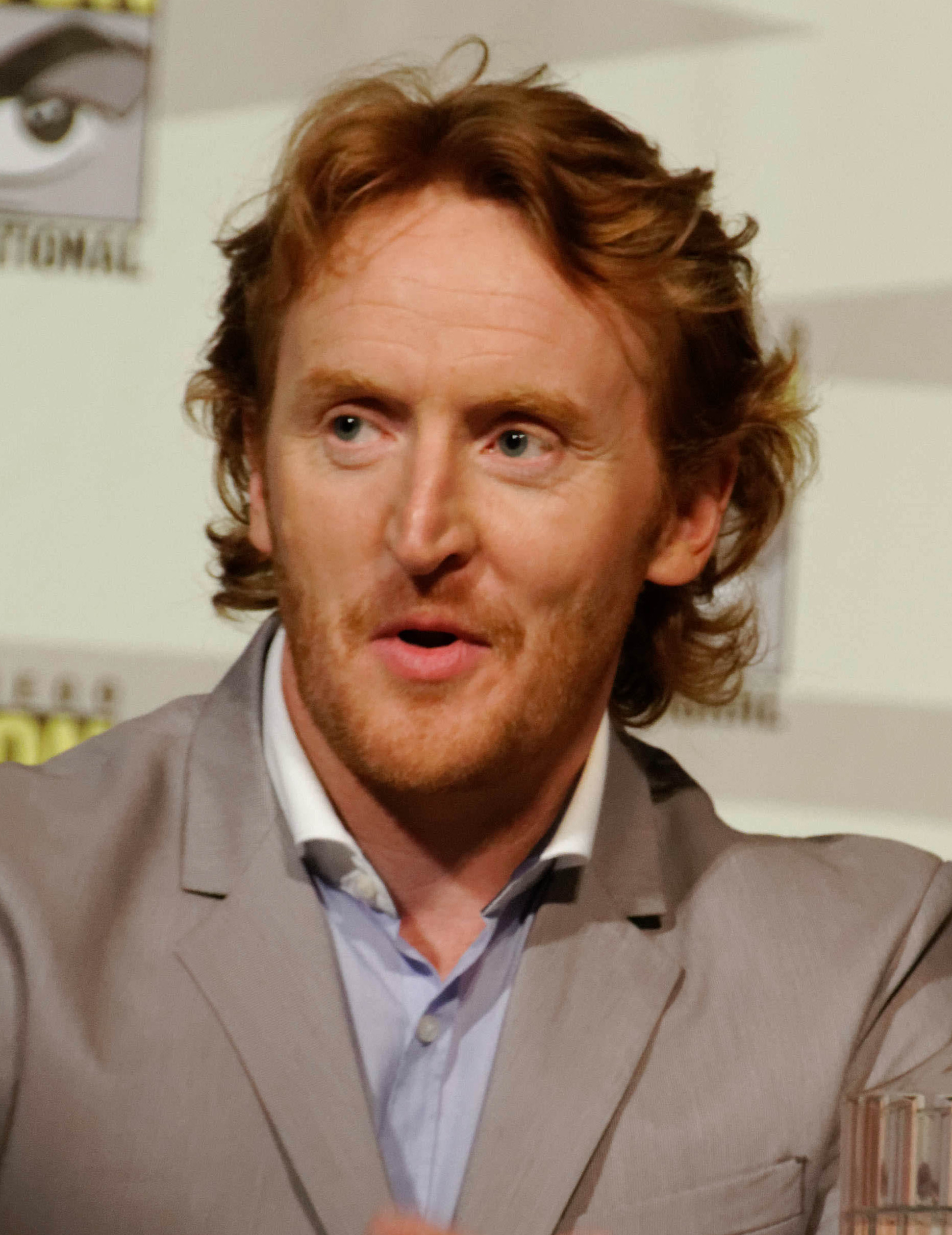
Tony Curran won for Red Road (2006).

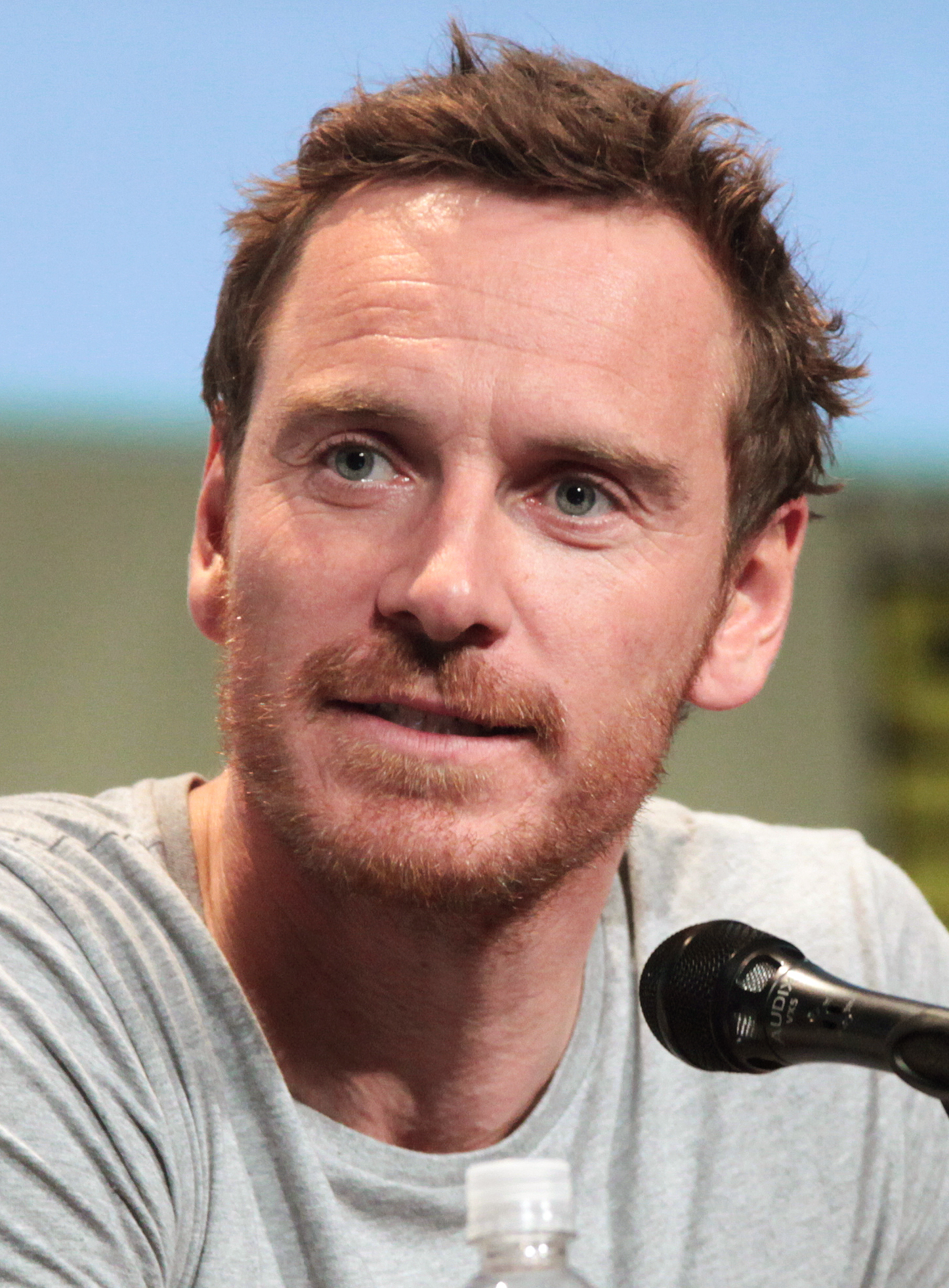
Michael Fassbender has won for Hunger (2008) and Shame (2011).

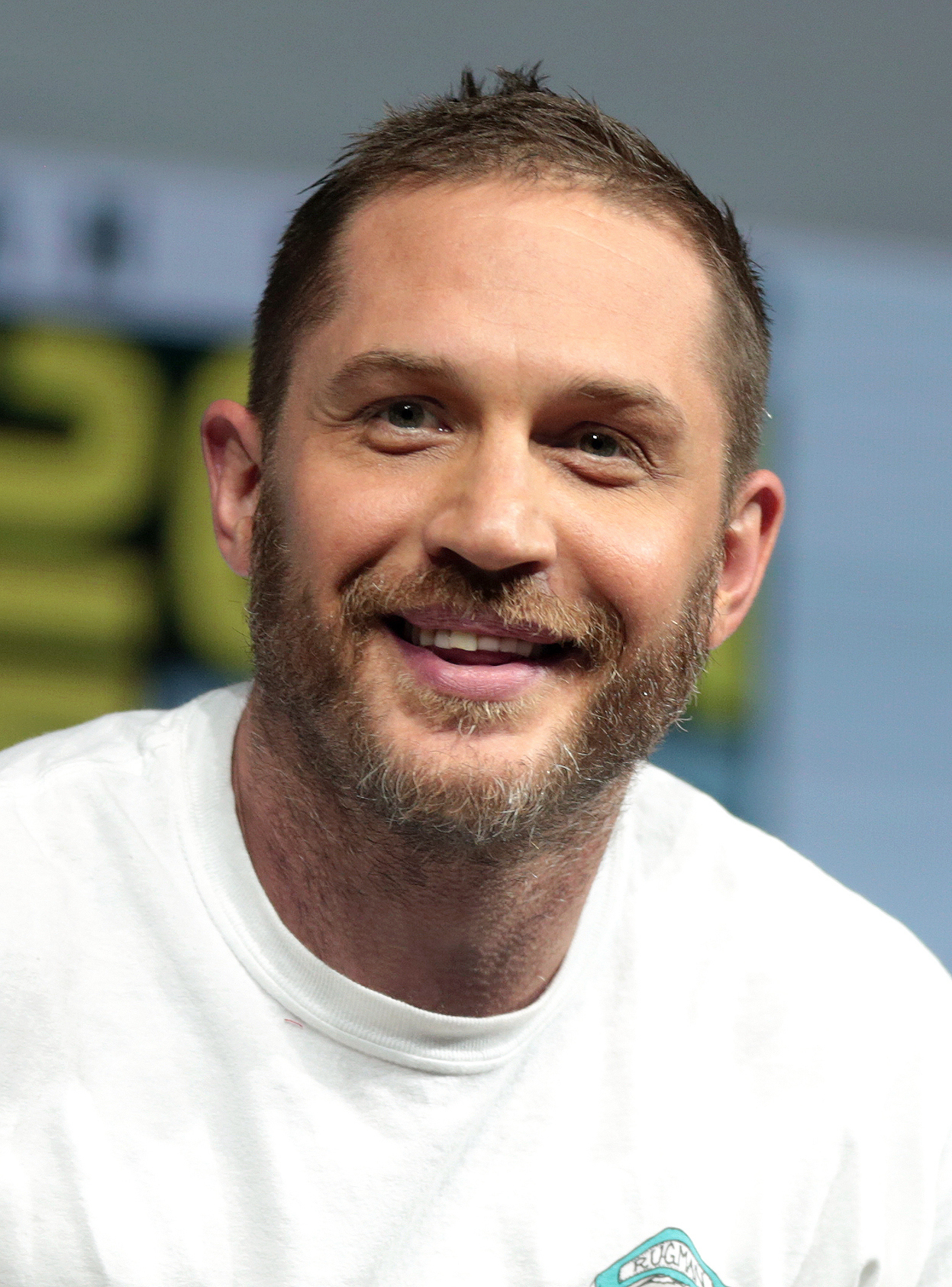
Tom Hardy has won for Bronson (2009) and Legend (2015).

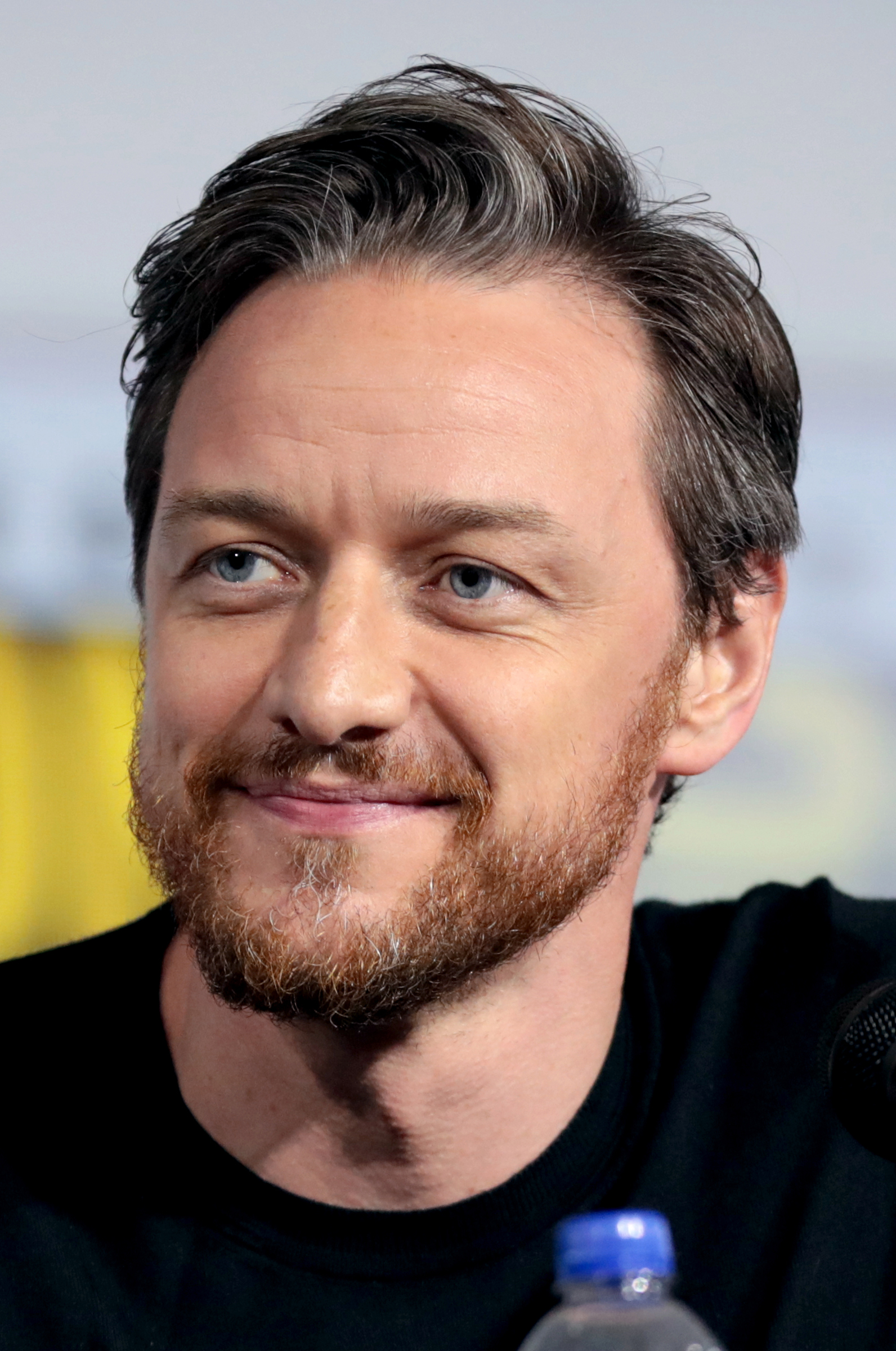
James McAvoy won for Filth (2013).

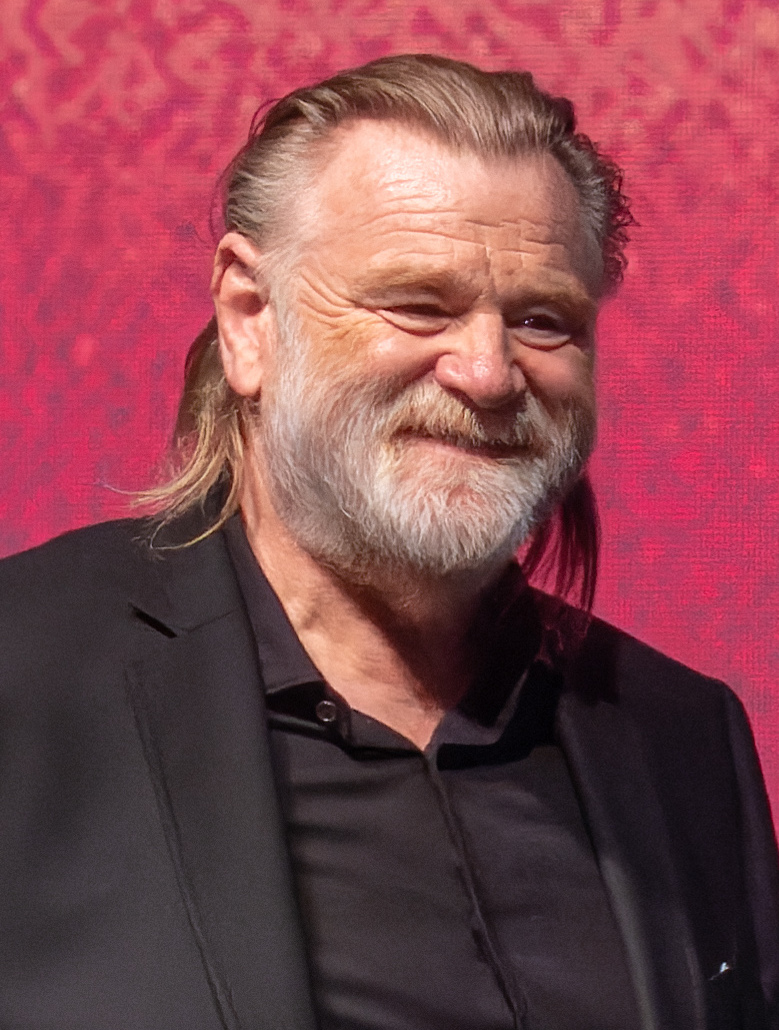
Brendan Gleeson won for Calvary (2014).

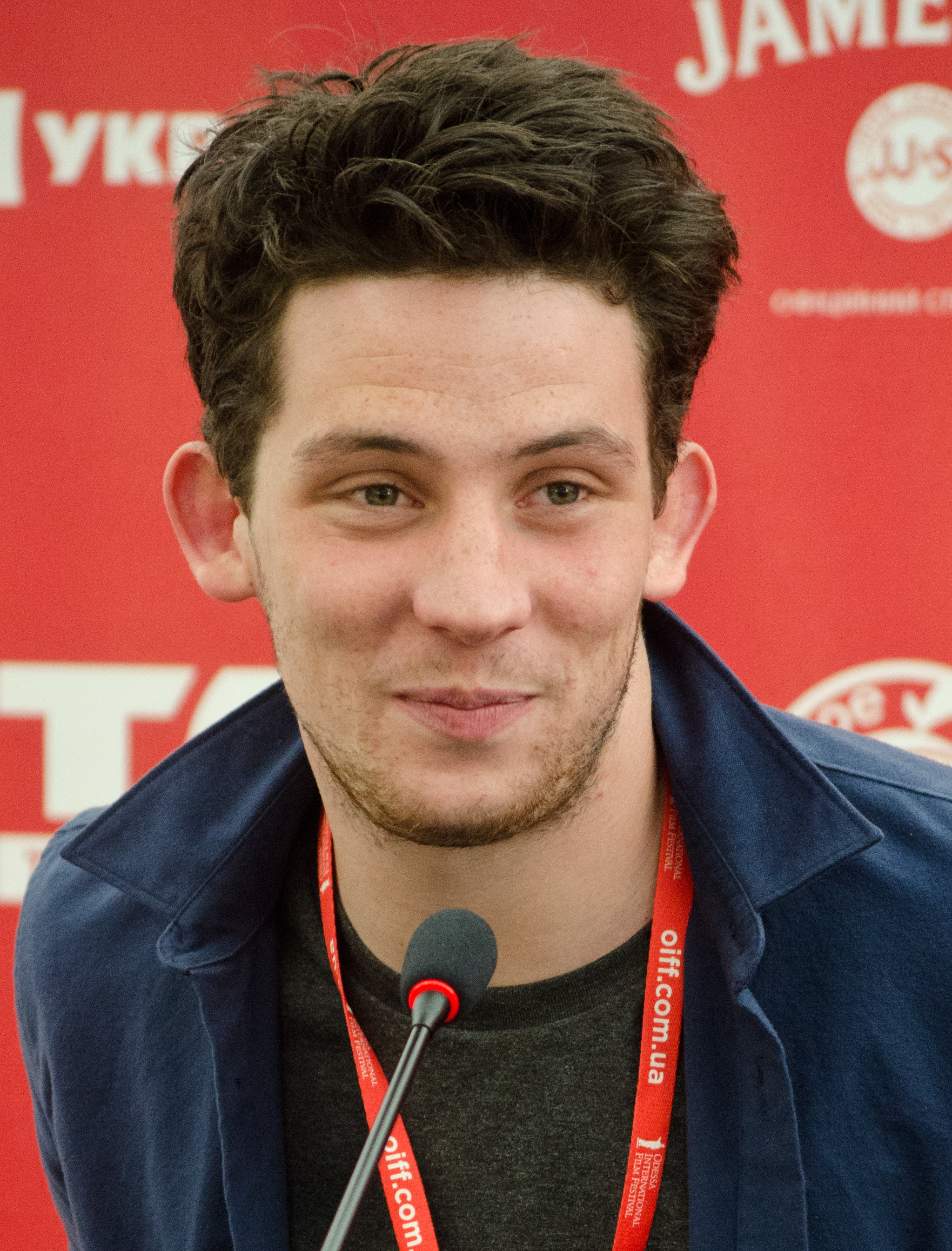
Josh O'Connor has won for God's Own Country (2017) and Only You (2019).

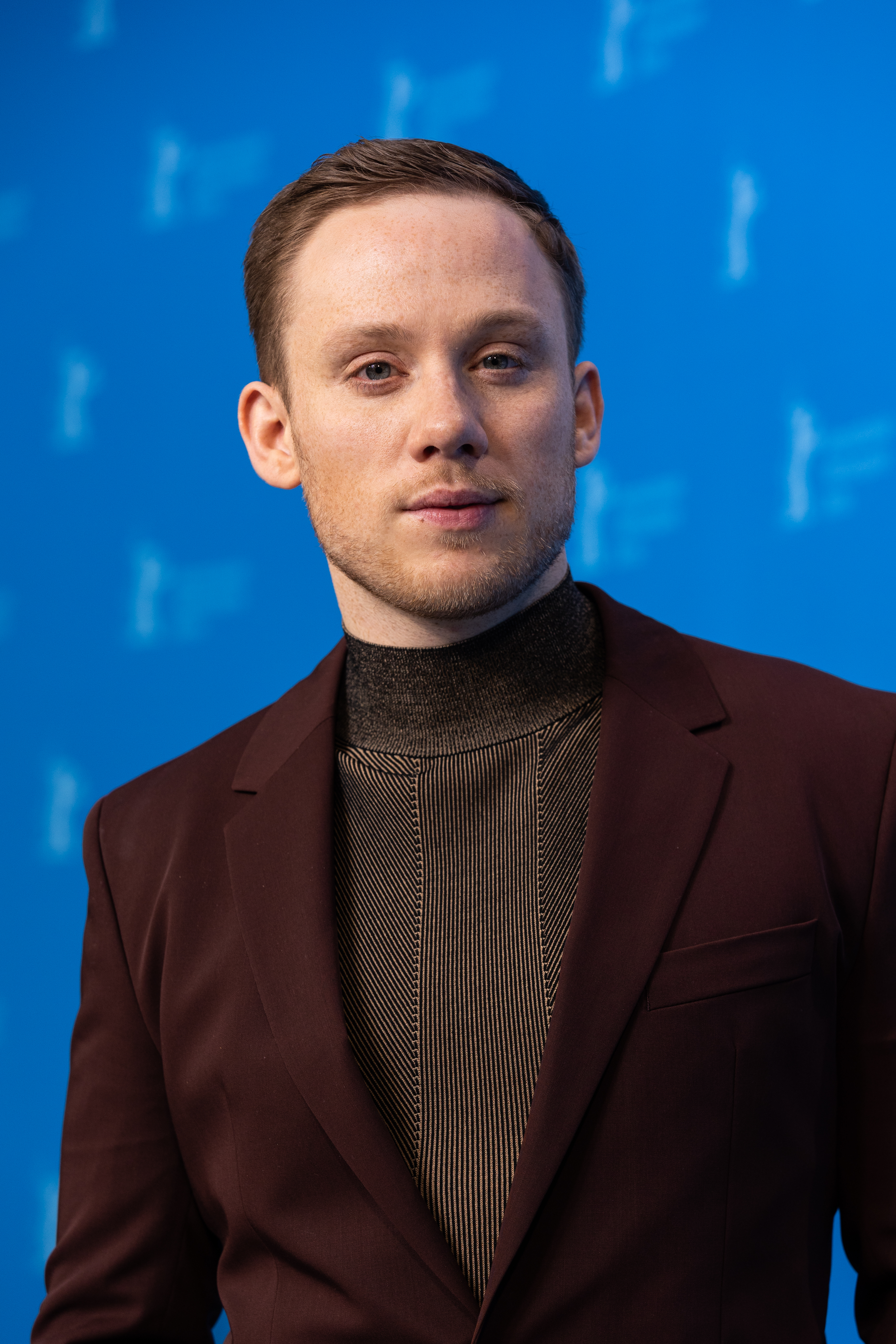
Joe Cole won for A Prayer Before Dawn (2018).

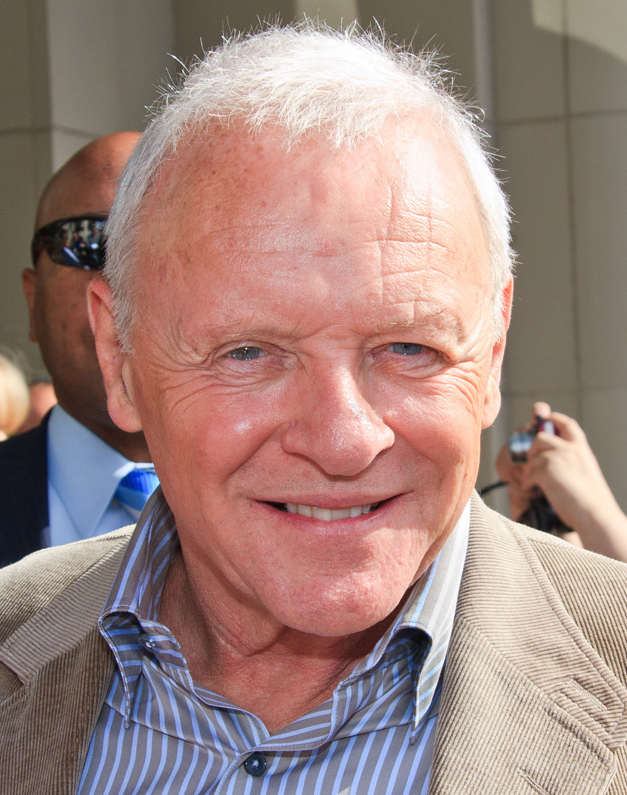
Anthony Hopkins won for The Father (2020).

=== 1990s ===
Year	Actor	Film	Character
1998 (1st)	Ray Winstone	Nil by Mouth	Raymond
1998 (1st)	John Hurt	Love and Death on Long Island	Giles De'Ath
1998 (1st)	Peter Mullan	My Name Is Joe	Joe Kavanagh
1998 (1st)	Jonathan Pryce	Regeneration	William Rivers
1998 (1st)	David Thewlis	Divorcing Jack	Dan Starkey
1999 (2nd)	Ian McKellen	Gods and Monsters	James Whale
1999 (2nd)	Daniel Auteuil	The Lost Son	Xavier Lombard
1999 (2nd)	Michael Caine	Little Voice	Ray Say
1999 (2nd)	Daniel Craig	The Trench	Sgt. Telford Winter
1999 (2nd)	Ray Winstone	The War Zone	Dad

=== 2000s ===
Year	Actor	Film	Character
2000 (3rd)	Daniel Craig	Some Voices	Ray
2000 (3rd)	Paul Bettany	Gangster No. 1	Young Gangster
2000 (3rd)	Jim Broadbent	Topsy-Turvy	W. S. Gilbert
2000 (3rd)	Adrian Lester	Love's Labour's Lost	Dumaine
2000 (3rd)	Peter Mullan	Miss Julie	Jean
2001 (4th)	Ben Kingsley	Sexy Beast	Don Logan
2001 (4th)	Ian Hart	Liam	Dad
2001 (4th)	Timothy Spall	Lucky Break	Cliff Gumbell
2001 (4th)	Ray Winstone	Sexy Beast	Gary "Gal" Dove
2002 (5th)	James Nesbitt	Bloody Sunday	Ivan Cooper
2002 (5th)	Richard Harris	My Kingdom	Sandeman
2002 (5th)	Bill Nighy	Lawless Heart	Dan
2002 (5th)	Timothy Spall	All or Nothing	Phil
2003 (6th)	Chiwetel Ejiofor	Dirty Pretty Things	Okwe
2003 (6th)	Paddy Considine	In America	Johnny Sullivan
2003 (6th)	Ewan McGregor	Young Adam	Joe Taylor
2003 (6th)	Kevin McKidd	16 Years of Alcohol	Frankie
2003 (6th)	Joaquin Phoenix	Buffalo Soldiers	Spc. Ray Elwood
2004 (7th)	Phil Davis	Vera Drake	Stanley Drake
2004 (7th)	Paddy Considine	Dead Man's Shoes	Richard
2004 (7th)	Daniel Craig	Enduring Love	Joe Rose
2004 (7th)	Ian Hart	Blind Flight	Brian Keenan
2004 (7th)	Geoffrey Rush	The Life and Death of Peter Sellers	Peter Sellers
2005 (8th)	Ralph Fiennes	The Constant Gardener	Justin Quayle
2005 (8th)	Johnny Depp	The Libertine	John Wilmot, 2nd Earl of Rochester
2005 (8th)	Chiwetel Ejiofor	Kinky Boots	Lola
2005 (8th)	Bob Hoskins	Mrs Henderson Presents	Vivian Van Damm
2005 (8th)	Matthew Macfadyen	In My Father's Den	Paul Prior
2006 (9th)	Tony Curran	Red Road	Clyde Henderson
2006 (9th)	James McAvoy	The Last King of Scotland	Nicholas Garrigan
2006 (9th)	Cillian Murphy	The Wind That Shakes the Barley	Damien O'Donovan
2006 (9th)	Peter O'Toole	Venus	Maurice Russell
2006 (9th)	Forest Whitaker	The Last King of Scotland	Idi Amin
2007 (10th)	Viggo Mortensen	Eastern Promises	Nikolai Luzhin
2007 (10th)	Jamie Bell	Hallam Foe	Hallam Foe
2007 (10th)	Jim Broadbent	And When Did You Last See Your Father?	Arthur Morrison
2007 (10th)	Cillian Murphy	Sunshine	Robert Capa
2007 (10th)	Sam Riley	Control	Ian Curtis
2008 (11th)	Michael Fassbender	Hunger	Bobby Sands
2008 (11th)	Riz Ahmed	Shifty	Shifty
2008 (11th)	Colin Farrell	In Bruges	Ray
2008 (11th)	Brendan Gleeson	In Bruges	Ken
2008 (11th)	Thomas Turgoose	Somers Town	Tomo
2009 (12th)	Tom Hardy	Bronson	Charles Bronson
2009 (12th)	Peter Capaldi	In the Loop	Malcolm Tucker
2009 (12th)	Aaron Johnson	Nowhere Boy	John Lennon
2009 (12th)	Sam Rockwell	Moon	Sam Bell
2009 (12th)	Andy Serkis	Sex & Drugs & Rock & Roll	Ian Dury

=== 2010s ===
Year	Actor	Film	Character
2010 (13th)	Colin Firth	The King's Speech	King George VI
2010 (13th)	Riz Ahmed	Four Lions	Omar
2010 (13th)	Jim Broadbent	Another Year	Tom Hepple
2010 (13th)	Aidan Gillen	Treacle Jr.	Aidan
2010 (13th)	Scoot McNairy	Monsters	Andrew Kaulder
2011 (14th)	Michael Fassbender	Shame	Brandon Sullivan
2011 (14th)	Brendan Gleeson	The Guard	Sergeant Gerry Boyle
2011 (14th)	Neil Maskell	Kill List	Jay
2011 (14th)	Peter Mullan	Tyrannosaur	Joseph
2011 (14th)	Gary Oldman	Tinker Tailor Soldier Spy	George Smiley
2012 (15th)	Toby Jones	Berberian Sound Studio	Gilderoy
2012 (15th)	Riz Ahmed	Ill Manors	Aaron
2012 (15th)	Steve Oram	Sightseers	Chris
2012 (15th)	Tim Roth	Broken	Archie Cunningham
2012 (15th)	Terence Stamp	Song for Marion	Arthur
2013 (16th)	James McAvoy	Filth	Bruce Robertson
2013 (16th)	Jim Broadbent	Le Week-End	Nick Burrows
2013 (16th)	Steve Coogan	Philomena	Martin Sixsmith
2013 (16th)	Tom Hardy	Locke	Ivan Locke
2013 (16th)	Jack O'Connell	Starred Up	Eric Love
2014 (17th)	Brendan Gleeson	Calvary	Father James Lavelle
2014 (17th)	Asa Butterfield	X+Y	Nathan Ellis
2014 (17th)	Benedict Cumberbatch	The Imitation Game	Alan Turing
2014 (17th)	Jack O'Connell	'71	Gary Hook
2014 (17th)	Timothy Spall	Mr. Turner	J. M. W. Turner
2015 (18th)	Tom Hardy	Legend	Ronnie Kray and Reggie Kray
2015 (18th)	Tom Courtenay	45 Years	Geoff Mercer
2015 (18th)	Colin Farrell	The Lobster	David
2015 (18th)	Michael Fassbender	Macbeth	Macbeth
2015 (18th)	Tom Hiddleston	High-Rise	Dr. Robert Laing
2016 (19th)	Dave Johns	I, Daniel Blake	Daniel Blake
2016 (19th)	Steven Brandon	My Feral Heart	Luke
2016 (19th)	Michael Fassbender	Trespass Against Us	Chad Cutler
2016 (19th)	Shia LaBeouf	American Honey	Jake
2016 (19th)	Max Records	I Am Not a Serial Killer	John Wayne Cleaver
2017 (20th)	Josh O'Connor	God's Own Country	Johnny Saxby
2017 (20th)	Jamie Bell	Film Stars Don't Die in Liverpool	Peter Turner
2017 (20th)	Paddy Considine	Journeyman	Matty Burton
2017 (20th)	Johnny Harris	Jawbone	Jimmy McCabe
2017 (20th)	Alec Secăreanu	God's Own Country	Gheorghe Ionescu
2018 (21st)	Joe Cole	A Prayer Before Dawn	Billy Moore
2018 (21st)	Steve Coogan	Stan & Ollie	Stan Laurel
2018 (21st)	Rupert Everett	The Happy Prince	Oscar Wilde
2018 (21st)	Joaquin Phoenix	You Were Never Really Here	Joe
2018 (21st)	Charlie Plummer	Lean on Pete	Charley Thompson
2019 (22nd)	Josh O'Connor	Only You	Jake
2019 (22nd)	Sam Adewunmi	The Last Tree	Femi
2019 (22nd)	Tom Burke	The Souvenir	Anthony
2019 (22nd)	Kris Hitchen	Sorry We Missed You	Ricky Turner
2019 (22nd)	Dev Patel	The Personal History of David Copperfield	David Copperfield

=== 2020s ===
Year	Actor	Film	Character
2020 (23rd)	Anthony Hopkins	The Father	Anthony
2020 (23rd)	Riz Ahmed	Mogul Mowgli	Zed
2020 (23rd)	Sope Dirisu	His House	Bol
2020 (23rd)	Amir El-Masry	Limbo	Omarr
2020 (23rd)	Cosmo Jarvis	Calm with Horses	Douglas
2021 (24th)	Adeel Akhtar	Ali & Ava	Ali
2021 (24th)	Riz Ahmed	Encounter	Malik Kahn
2021 (24th)	Stephen Graham	Boiling Point	Andy Jones
2021 (24th)	Jude Law	The Nest	Rory O'Hara
2021 (24th)	James Norton	Nowhere Special	John

== Multiple nominations ==
5 nominations

- Riz Ahmed

4 nominations

- Jim Broadbent
- Michael Fassbender

3 nominations

- Paddy Considine
- Daniel Craig
- Brendan Gleeson
- Tom Hardy
- Peter Mullan
- Ray Winstone

2 nominations

- Jamie Bell
- Steve Coogan
- Chiwetel Ejiofor
- Colin Farrell
- James McAvoy
- Josh O'Connor
- Joaquin Phoenix

== Multiple wins ==
2 wins

- Michael Fassbender
- Tom Hardy
- Josh O'Connor

== See also ==
- Academy Award for Best Actor
- BAFTA Award for Best Actor in a Leading Role
- Critics' Choice Movie Award for Best Actor
- Golden Globe Award for Best Actor – Motion Picture Drama
- Golden Globe Award for Best Actor – Motion Picture Musical or Comedy
- Screen Actors Guild Award for Outstanding Performance by a Male Actor in a Leading Role
