= Jeremy Cameron (author) =

British author (1947–2023)

Jeremy Cameron (1947–2023) was a British probation officer and author.

== Biography ==
Cameron is most famous for his Nicky Burkett series of stories: Vinnie Got Blown Away, It Was an Accident, Wider Than Walthamstow, Brown Bread in Wengen and Hell on Hoe Street.

It Was An Accident was later turned into a film starring Chiwetel Ejiofor and Thandiwe Newton.

Cameron was signed with publishing houses: Hope Road Publishing and L.R. Price Publications. He also self-published several non-fiction works.

Cameron died suddenly in 2023, at the age of 76.

His final novel, A Norfolk Man, was posthumously published on 12th May 2024.
