= Murder Investigation Team (TV series) =

British police procedural TV series (2003–2005)

- Genre: Police procedural Crime thriller Murder mystery Drama
- Starring: Samantha Spiro; Lindsey Coulson; Diane Parish; Michael McKell
- Ending theme: "Sweet Bitter Love" performed by Petra Jean-Phillipson (Series 1)
- Country of origin: United Kingdom
- Original language: English
- No. of series: 2
- No. of episodes: 12

Production
- Running time: 60 minutes (w/advertisements, Series 1); 90 minutes (w/advertisements, Series 2)

Original release
- Network: ITV
- Release: 3 May 2003 – 1 August 2005

Related
- The Bill

Murder Investigation Team is a British police procedural drama/cop thriller series produced by the ITV network as a spin-off from the long-running series The Bill. The series recounts the activities of the Metropolitan Police's Murder Investigation Team, who are led in Series 1 by D.I. Vivien Friend (Samantha Spiro) and her more intuitive colleague D.C. Rosie MacManus (Lindsey Coulson). Series 2 sees old-school copper Trevor Hand (Michael McKell) taking the reins under D.C.I. Anita Wishart (Meera Syal) and manage the newly transferred D.C. Eva Sharpe (Diane Parish). The series produced 12 episodes between 3 May 2003 and 1 August 2005. In September 2005, The Sun reported that ITV would not be commissioning a third series.

== Background ==
Like The Bill, Murder Investigation Team was filmed in the London Boroughs of Sutton, Merton and Greenwich. Locations included the former Woolwich campus of the University of Greenwich. The first series debuted on 3 May 2003, and ran for eight episodes. This series was filmed with the working title Think Murder, and was produced by Tom Cotter. The first episode featured the team investigating the death of one of The Bill's most popular characters, Sgt. Matthew Boyden, who was killed in a drive-by shooting. Several members of The Bill's cast also appeared in the episode.

The first series also featured guest appearances from such actors as Gary Kemp, Paul Bown and Bradley Walsh. After a two-year hiatus, a second series of four episodes debuted on 11 July 2005. All four episodes had previously been broadcast in February 2005 in Australia. This series features the re-appearance of DC Eva Sharpe, who joined the team, transferring from the CID office at Sun Hill. Each episode in series two was extended by half an hour and was produced by ITV's head of drama, Johnathan Young.

== Cast and characters ==
=== Main cast and characters ===
- Samantha Spiro as Detective Inspector Vivien "Viv" Friend (series 1), a fast tracked, university-educated D.I. and the senior investigating officer of one of the Metropolitan Police's Murder Investigation Teams. In series 1, she is partnered with D.C. MacManus. Friend departs M.I.T. for promotion six months prior to the start of series 2, and is replaced as D.I. by her Sergeant and frequent sparring partner, Trevor Hands. She is described as detached and methodical.
- Michael McKell as Detective Sergeant/Inspector Trevor Hands (series 1–2), initially a Detective Sergeant assigned to Friend's M.I.T. team. Trevor is shown to be loyal to the old way of policing, and resentful of both female leadership and fast-track schemes. Following Friend's departure, he is promoted to D.I., a role he has held for six months by the start of series 2.
- Lindsey Coulson as Detective Constable/Sergeant Rosie MacManus (series 1–2), an M.I.T. detective. MacManus has two children, and must balance work and family life. It is for this reason that she remained a D.C. for much of her career. Four months prior to the start of series 2, she is promoted to D.S. at the behest of newly appointed D.C.I. Wishart, who wants to rid M.I.T. of its "old boys' network" mentality. In series 1, she is partnered with D.I. Friend, while in series 2 she is assigned by Hands to oversee the work of Eva Sharpe.
- Diane Parish as Detective Constable Eva Sharpe (series 2), a D.C. recruited by D.C.I. Wishart with just over 6 months' M.I.T. experience following her transfer from Sun Hill C.I.D. Eva is described as being sharp by nature, as well as by name, and during her time at borough policing she had earned herself a reputation as a lone wolf whose attitude "cuts both ways". Eva initially has an adversarial relationship with Hands, because of his relative inexperience as SIO. She is partnered with MacManus. Prior to appearing in series 2 of M.I.T., Parish played Sharpe on series 18–20 of parent programme The Bill.

=== Supporting cast and characters ===
- Steven Pacey as D.C.I. Malcolm Savage (Series 1), the Chief Inspector assigned to oversee the Murder Investigation Team during series 1.
- Meera Syal as D.C.I. Anita Wishart (Series 2), the Chief Inspector assigned to oversee the Murder Investigation Team having taken over four months prior to the events of series 2.
- Richard Hope as D.S. Barry Purvis (Series 1–2), an office-based detective who coordinates investigations and liaises between police stations.
- Howard Ward as D.S. Jim Dawes (Series 1), the crime scene lead on Friend's team.
- Andrew Somerville as D.C. Patrick Lincoln (Series 1), a junior D.C. assigned to Friend's team.
- Joe Shaw as D.C. Scott Grainger (Series 1), a promising junior D.C. assigned to Friend's team. His death leads to Friend's departure between series.
- Abhin Galeya as D.C. Simon Tait (Series 2), a tech savvy junior D.C. assigned to Hands' team.
- Will Mellor as D.C. Jed Griffiths (Series 2), an enthusiast D.C. and lady's man, assigned to Hands' team.
- Richard Huw as Dr John Cornell (Series 1), a pathologist.
- Vincenzo Pellegrino as Dr Fergus Gallagher (Series 1), a Scenes of Crime Officer.
- Hugh Sachs as Dr Charles Renfield (Series 2), a Scenes of Crime Officer.

== Episodes ==
Series	Episodes	Originally released	
Series	Episodes	First released	Last released
1	8	3 May 2003	21 June 2003
2	4	11 July 2005	1 August 2005

=== Series 1 (2003) ===
No. overall	No. in series	Title	Directed by	Written by	Original release date	Viewers (millions)
1	1	"Moving Targets"	Michael Offer	Jake Riddell	3 May 2003	7.51
Following the deaths of Sgt. Matthew Boyden and an unidentified black man in a drive-by shooting, the gunman makes a speedy getaway leaving the team with no idea which man was the intended target. Meanwhile, Boyden's drug addicted daughter, Amy, hears the news from a custody cell back at the nick. Still in shock, evidence collected from Amy and colleagues leads the team to discover Boyden was not always on the right side of the law. He may have had a few skeletons in his closet, but did anyone hold a killer grudge? The investigation takes a surprising turn when D.I. Nixon is brought in for questioning – her underage daughter has been involved with Boyden and she is now a suspect in the enquiry. Guest appearances: Tony O'Callaghan, Lisa Maxwell, René Zagger, Roberta Taylor, Cyril Nri and Trevor McDonald
2	2	"Daddy's Little Girl"	Michael Offer	Jake Riddell	10 May 2003	6.82
Friend investigates the murder of a young woman whose remains have been found preserved in a concrete tomb at a demolition site. The only clues to her identity are a healed scar along her left hand and a puncture mark at the base of her spine from a medical procedure. The investigation leads to a three-year-old missing person's case in which a young girl vanished from her parents' pub without trace. When the autopsy confirms it is the same missing girl, Friend has to break the news of her death to her distraught parents. The strongest lead is a mysterious photograph of their daughter with an unidentified man. The pathologist then reveals she was in the early stages of pregnancy. Guest appearances: Bradley Walsh, Dean Ashton, Tracie Bennett and Pete Lee-Wilson
3	3	"Rubbish"	Nigel Keen	Avril E. Russell	17 May 2003	6.13
The dismembered body of a small child is found on a Thames rubbish barge. A painstaking search through layers of decaying rubbish reveals some clues but a discovery during the post mortem is even more disturbing. The little boy's heart has been crudely removed from his body and it looks like his murder could be African ritualistic killing. The murdered child's parents have logged a missing person's report, but their priest prevents Friend from making contact. Offering to act as their interpreter, the priest speaks on their behalf, but Friend soon realises the parents do, in fact, speak English. Does the priest know more about the child's murder than he is letting on? Also, where is their younger child, Francis? Guest appearances: Tim Faraday, Sam Parks and Courtney Phillips
4	4	"Reading, Writing and Gangbanging"	Nigel Keen	Jake Riddell	24 May 2003	5.37
The team is called out to a double murder on a rundown housing estate. A middle-aged teacher, Martin Ramsey, has been pushed from his third floor window, and an old homeless man, Nelson Fairgrave, is found floating in a nearby lake – but what is the connection between the two men? A promising line of enquiry opens up when the police find out Ramsey was being intimidated by an ex-pupil, but there is little information to be had about the homeless man. When the police find several different trainer prints near to the lakeside, they know they are looking for more than one man, but who would have wanted to kill Nelson Fairgrave, and why has Ramsey's computer been tampered with? Guest appearances: John Duttine, Elizabeth Conboy and Dickon Tolson
5	5	"Red Heads"	Ged Maguire	Avril E. Russell	31 May 2003	5.55
When the body of Penny Wake, a young red-haired housewife, is found in undergrowth by a mother and son out jogging, Friend and the team is called in to investigate her death. There are no signs of a struggle but her body has been cleaned inside and out with bleach, and the team knows it is looking for a calculating and forensically-aware killer. Her husband, Neil, has no alibi for the night of her murder and is consequently their prime suspect, but, when another red-haired woman is brought into the local hospital drugged and disorientated, a new line of enquiry opens up for the team, which leads its to one man's terrible and dark secret. Is he prepared to kill again? Guest appearances: Benedict Taylor, Lee Warburton and Debbie Arnold
6	6	"Models and Millionaires"	Ged Maguire	Jake Riddell	14 June 2003	5.05
Natasha McKay is the woman with everything – a glamorous modelling career and a rich property developer for a husband. However, when her disfigured body washes up on the banks of the Thames, it becomes apparent that Natasha's life was not all that it seemed. An ex-school friend comes forward to come clean about his affair with Natasha: they were in love and they were going to marry. When the team interviews her husband, Dennis McKay, though, he has an alibi for the night of her disappearance. Soon enough, a ring of faked pornographic photographs and the gambling debts of one of McKay's co-workers reveal the true motive for murder – and Friend is sure that the evidence is strong enough to warrant an arrest. Guest appearances: Gary Kemp, Paul Bown and Darren Tighe
7	7	"Lambs to the Slaughter"	Susan Tully	Tom Needham	7 June 2003	5.36
When convicted child sex offender Dominic Moreton is bludgeoned to death in his own home, it looks like the work of vigilantes. The team's most promising lead in the enquiry is a phone call that the victim made to a possible associate, Peter Taylor. Dominic had been calling Peter regularly, so when they search his house and find photos of Dominic with Peter's wife, it throws up all manner of questions. Soon, they discover that Dominic and Peter are the same person – Peter was an undercover SO10 officer – and that he recorded his own murder on his wife's answer machine. Friend realises that, if they can decipher the background noise on the tape, they might be able to discover what really happened to Peter. Guest appearances: Billy Carter, Amanda Drew and Nigel Lister
8	8	"The Bigger the Lie"	Nigel Keen	Julian Perkins	21 June 2003	4.73
Tensions run high in the Bangladeshi community when the body of journalist Ellen Merrick is found dead in a disused shop in the local market place. Witnesses are reluctant to come forward to the police so the only clue the team has to work with is a bloody trainer print and some fibres from a nylon tracksuit at the crime scene. The team urgently needs to find out what story Ellen was working on at the time of her death, but newspaper colleagues are reluctant to co-operate and, with silence from the local community, Friend needs to move quickly if she is to catch Ellen's killer, but she certainly does not count on another case opening up before her eyes. Guest appearances: Miah Choudry, Heather McHale and Valerine Minifie

=== Series 2 (2005) ===
No. overall	No. in series	Title	Directed by	Written by	Original release date
9	1	"Phone Tag"	Gary Love	Charlie Fletcher	11 July 2005
The team is called to the scene of a violent street stabbing, in which young Lithuanian Ed Villarin collapses and dies in the street after being stabbed with an ice pick during a game of "phone tag", in which strangers join the game over the internet and must "hunt" and photograph the "target" with their mobile phone. Initially, Hands suspects that outside influences, such as Ed's involvement with the importation of stolen mobile phones, and a violent argument with a former co-worker, are the motives behind his murder. However, convinced that the answer lies somewhere within the game, Tait attempts to track down the controller. MacManus and Sharpe arrive to find him; the next level of the game is the kill. Guest appearances: Kenneth Cranham, Clare Higgins, Stacey Roca, Oliver Cotton
10	2	"Vipers' Nest"	Gary Love	Andrew Rattenbury	18 July 2005
The team uncovers a vipers' nest of malpractice and drug-dealing after a popular medical registrar, Karl Anderson, is pushed off a hospital roof into a busy social gathering below. With many suspects to question, and a number of leads to follow, the team soon finds itself under pressure to catch the killer before he strikes again. A search of Karl's house discovers a seventeen-year-old girl's medical file hidden between a collection of old LPs, and the discovery that she died just five days after a routine appendix operation. Suspecting that the hospital's clinical lead, Dr. Stuart Masters, may have botched the operation in order to save time, the team is given a perfect motive for his murder. Guest appearances: Anthony Head, Cathy Tyson, Amanda Ryan, Melanie Thaw
11	3	"Professional"	Reza Moradi	Mark Burt	25 July 2005
The pressure is on the team as the net tightens to secure a result when professional football player Sean Reynolds is found beaten to death near a local park. Suspicion falls on both his close and estranged family – as well as angry group of fans who were furious about his decision to leave the club – but no secure leads or forensic evidence can lead to a concrete conviction. The key to the entire case soon boils down to whether Sean's wife or his mother-in-law was the driver of her Mercedes Coupe, which is spotted on CCTV following Sean to the location of his death. Tait's interview techniques prove to be the catalyst for solving the case – but he is not convinced of who is responsible for the murder. Guest appearances: Jack Ryder, Tim Healy, Naomi Benson, Chike Okonkwo, Paul Antony-Barber
12	4	"Sexual Tension"	Gary Love	Andrew Rattenbury	1 August 2005
Sexual tension becomes rife among the team when a crime scene colleague is found strangled in her flat, with her underwear having been placed in her mouth. The initial investigation becomes complicated when a second victim is found dead in similar circumstances. However, there are several discrepancies with the second killing that make it look more like a "copycat" rather than the same killer – but the team is baffled as to how the killer got hold of the information, when it has not been released to the press. When CCTV shows Hands accompanying the victim home, he soon becomes the prime suspect – but can his best friend and colleague, MacManus, prove that he is not capable of murder? Guest appearances: Danny Dyer, Lee Ross, Vincent Regan, Andrew Tiernan

== Home releases ==
The entire series Murder Investigation Team has been released on DVD (under licence from Talkback Thames and FremantleMedia Enterprises). In North America (Region 1), the series was distributed by Acorn Media, where both series one and two have been released individually between 2011 and 2012. In the UK (Region 2), the series was distributed by Eureka Entertainment for its first series in 2005, and through the now-defunct Network Distribution for the complete series in 2013. The second series has never been made individually in the UK. In Australia (Region 4), series one and two were never released individually, but did receive a complete series set in 2013 via Shock Records.

The complete series was additionally re-released on DVD, in the UK from Old Gold Media in 2025 and in Australia from Via Vision in 2021.

Series	Ep #	Release date		
Series	Ep #	Region 1	Region 2	Region 4
Series One	8	1 March 2011	11 July 2005	—N/a
Series Two	4	27 March 2012	—N/a	—N/a
Series One & Two	12	—N/a	16 September 2013	5 June 2013
Series One & Two (re-release)	12	—N/a	24 February 2025	1 December 2021
