= Tricker's =

British shoesmaker

R.E. Tricker Ltd
- Industry: Retail
- Founded: 1829
- Founder: Joseph Tricker
- Headquarters: Northampton, United Kingdom
- Products: Shoes
- Website: www.trickers.com

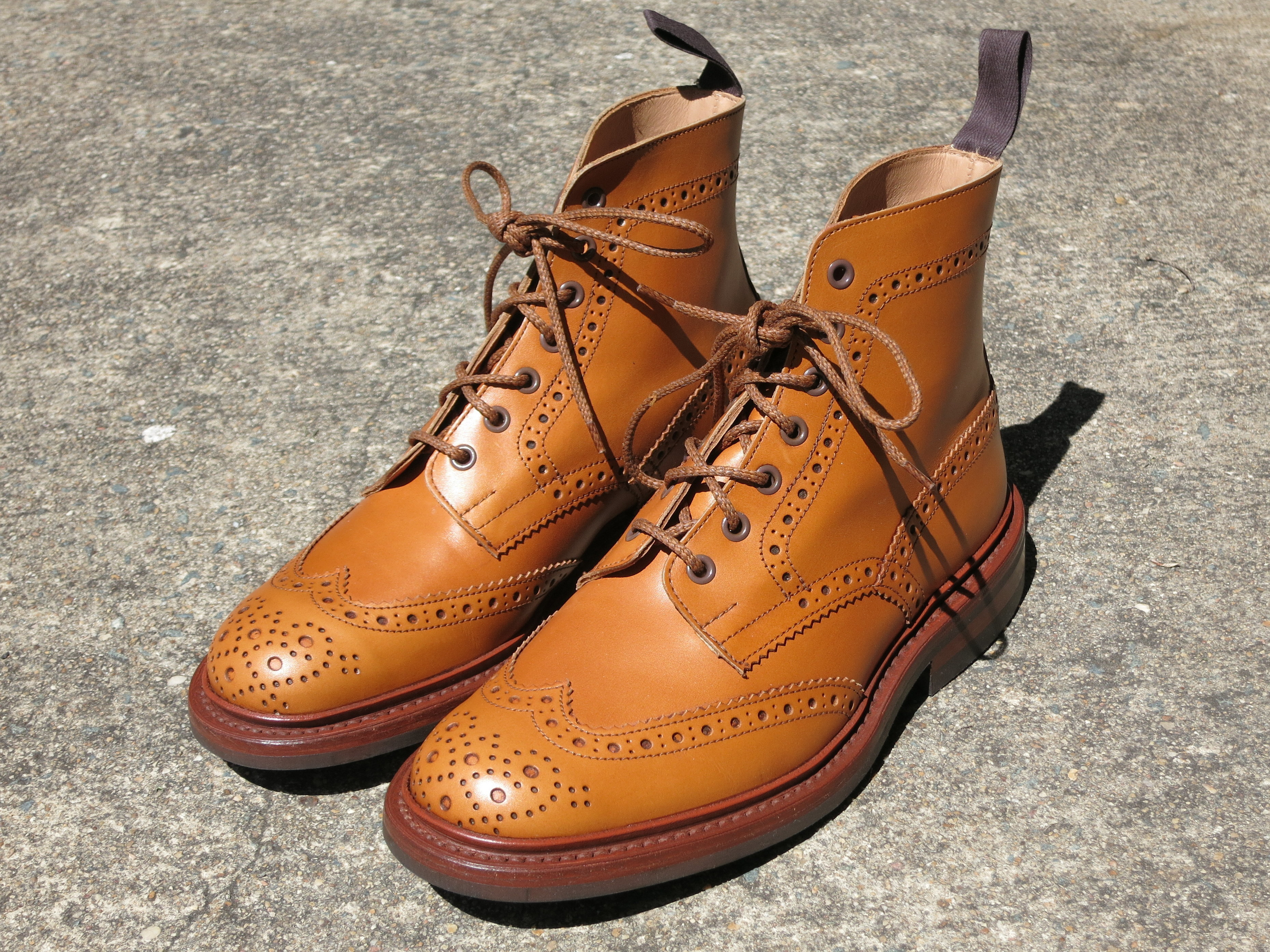
A pair of Tricker's Stow country boots

R.E. Tricker Ltd, which trades as Tricker's, is a British footwear company established in 1829 by Joseph Tricker in Northampton.

== Products and history ==
Tricker's produces men's and women's shoes and boots, as well as leather accessories such as belts and wallets. It is best known for its heavy country boots and shoes, and was one of several Northampton-based companies identified as having survived the downturn in British shoemaking between the 1970s and 2000s and "carved out a niche for themselves at the top end of the international shoe market" by The Telegraph in 2012. The company was granted a royal warrant in 1989.

Tricker's factory in Northampton is a Grade II listed building. Much of the film Kinky Boots was filmed in the factory.

As of 2019, Tricker's operated several shops in the UK as well as a single store in Tokyo. A BBC story reported that 80 per cent of the company's sales were overseas, and it was considering opening other shops in South Korea and the United States.

Tricker's closed its factory and shops in March 2020 in response to the COVID-19 pandemic. This was the first time the firm had stopped producing shoes since it was established. The closure of the factory was necessary on health grounds, as it was not practical for staff to practice social distancing in it. Tricker's received a funding facility from its bank in May that year to enable it to be able to rapidly resume operations.

In 2021 Tricker's employed 86 workers in its factory who typically produced 1,000 pairs of shoes weekly.

During 2023 and 2024 Tricker's revenue decreased and the firm made financial losses. James Fayed purchased a 71 percent stake in Tricker's in May 2025 through his holding company, Blu Heartknot UK. The Barltrop family, who were the long-term owners of the company, will continue to be involved in its management. Following the change in ownership, the company announced that it would focus on a direct to consumer business model and deprioritise wholesale customers. At this time, Tricker's had 79 employees.
