= Courtney Phillips =

British actor

Courtney Phillips is a British actor. He was born in London, and at the age of eleven, he appeared in an episode of Murder Investigation Team as Young Rudy. He later appeared in several TV advertisements. In 2005 he played the role of Young Lola in the cast of the film Kinky Boots. Two years later, he appeared in the musical The Lion King as young Simba.
