= Dirty Pretty Things (film) =

2002 British film

- Theatrical release poster
- Directed by: Stephen Frears
- Written by: Steven Knight
- Produced by: Tracey Seaward; Robert Jones
- Starring: Chiwetel Ejiofor; Audrey Tautou; Sergi López; Sophie Okonedo; Benedict Wong; Zlatko Buric
- Cinematography: Chris Menges
- Edited by: Mick Audsley
- Music by: Nathan Larson
- Production companies: BBC Films; Celador Films
- Distributed by: Miramax International (through Buena Vista International)
- Release dates: 5 September 2002 (Venice); 13 December 2002 (United Kingdom)
- Running time: 97 minutes
- Country: United Kingdom
- Language: English
- Budget: $10 million
- Box office: $13.9 million

Dirty Pretty Things is a 2002 British social thriller film directed by Stephen Frears and written by Steven Knight. Following the lives of two immigrants in London, it was produced by BBC Films and Celador Films, and distributed by Buena Vista International through Miramax Films.

== Plot ==
Okwe, a doctor in his home country (not initially named) who was forced to flee after being falsely accused of murdering his wife, lives in the United Kingdom as an undocumented immigrant. He drives a cab in London during the day and works at the front desk of a hotel at night, which is staffed by other immigrants, both documented and undocumented. He is pressed to treat other poor immigrants, including fellow cab drivers with venereal diseases, with scarce supplies provided by his friend Guo Yi, an employee at a hospital mortuary.

Juliette, a sex worker who regularly conducts her business at the hotel, informs Okwe about a blocked toilet in one of the rooms, and he fishes out a human heart. The manager of the hotel, Juan, runs an illegal operation at the hotel wherein immigrants swap kidneys for forged passports. After learning of Okwe's past as a doctor, Juan pressures him to join his operation as a surgeon, but Okwe refuses.

Senay is a Turkish Muslim seeking asylum who also works at the hotel as a cleaner. Her immigration status allows her to stay in the UK, provided she does not work; the hotel is a perfect cover because she is not named on its books. She allows Okwe to sleep on her sofa when she is not home, as she is from a conservative culture where men and women who are not married do not spend the night together under the same roof. After Senay is visited by Immigration Services, who inspect the hotel after finding a book of matches in her flat, Okwe prevents the officials from intercepting her.

No longer able to work at the hotel, Senay begins working in a sweatshop making clothes, which is also raided by officials looking for undocumented immigrants, who the manager gets rid of. The manager offers to allow Senay to keep her job and not report her to the authorities in return for performing oral sex on him; she initially complies before biting him. Okwe finds her a place to stay at the hospital mortuary, while Senay asks him to accept Juan's proposition in his organ business to raise money to travel to America.

In desperation, Senay offers her kidney to Juan for a passport; Juan accepts the deal on condition he takes her virginity as well. Senay is later provided with a morning-after pill by Juliette. After learning of Senay's plan, Okwe agrees to perform the operation to ensure her safety, but only if Juan provides them both with passports under different names. After Juan delivers the passports, Okwe and Senay drug him, surgically remove his kidney, and sell it to Juan's contact.

Okwe plans to use his new identity to return to his young daughter in Nigeria, and Senay plans to start a new life in New York. Before they part at Stansted Airport, they mouth the words "I love you" to each other, and she gives him her cousin's address in New York. Senay boards her plane, and Okwe calls his daughter long-distance to tell her he is finally coming home.

== Cast ==
- Chiwetel Ejiofor as Okwe/Olatokumbo Fadipe
- Audrey Tautou as Senay Gelik
- Sergi López as Sneaky (Juan)
- Sophie Okonedo as Juliette
- Benedict Wong as Guo Yi
- Damon Younger as Punter
- Paul Bhattacharjee as Mohammed
- Darrell D'Silva as Immigration officer
- Sotigui Kouyaté as Shinti
- Abi Gouhad as Shinti's son
- Zlatko Buric as Ivan

== Reception ==
=== Critical response ===
Dirty Pretty Things received positive reviews. Metacritic gives it a rating of 78/100 based on reviews from 35 critics. Rotten Tomatoes gives it a score of 94% based on 143 reviews, and an average rating of 7.8/10. The site's critical consensus describes the film as "An illuminating and nuanced film about the exploitation of illegal immigrants." J. R. Jones of The Chicago Reader described it as an "impressive mix of entertainment and social comment, spinning a great mystery even as it confronts an ugly world". The New Yorker called the film "a social thriller—a creepy, tightly knit suspense film that, on the fly, reveals more about the lives of immigrants in London than the most scrupulously earnest documentary," a sentiment echoed by the authors of Sociology: An Introductory Textbook and Reader of the film as being "not a documentary but a social thriller which blends aspects of the global urban legends about child kidnapping for organs and prostitutes drugging unsuspecting barflies who wake up in a hotel bathtub minus a kidney".

=== Accolades ===
Dirty Pretty Things was nominated for an Academy Award for Best Original Screenplay and won a British Independent Film Award for Best Independent British Film in 2003. For his performance as Okwe, Chiwetel Ejiofor won the 2003 British Independent Film Award for Best Actor. The film also won Best Director and Best Screenplay at the ceremony.
