= Going Off Big Time =

- Directed by: Jim Doyle
- Written by: Neil Fitzmaurice
- Produced by: Michael Blakey, Ian Brady
- Starring: Bernard Hill, Dominic Carter, Neil Fitzmaurice, Stan Boardman
- Cinematography: Damian Bromley
- Edited by: Julian Day
- Music by: Michael J. Moran, Andy Roberts
- Release date: 2000
- Running time: 86 minutes
- Country: United Kingdom
- Language: English

Going Off Big Time is a British gangster film set in Liverpool written by Neil Fitzmaurice and directed by Jim Doyle. It follows the story of gangster Mark Clayton as he reminisces on his life of crime.

== Plot ==
Mark Clayton is hiding out at the house of his solicitor following a gangland shooting. Through a series of flashbacks he reminisces on his life and how he ended up a gangster. Once a law-abiding man, he was imprisoned after accidentally hitting a police officer. Bullied in prison, he is befriended by fellow prisoner, Murray, and taught to stand up for himself. Following leaving prison, Clayton struggles to live a normal life and finds himself drawn deeper into crime, culminating with the shooting of a rival gangster's son.

== Cast ==
- Neil Fitzmaurice as Mark Clayton
- Dominic Carter as Ozzi Shepherd
- Bernard Hill as Murray
- Sarah Alexander as Stacey Bannerman
- Stan Boardman as Arthur McCann
- Peter Kay as Flipper

== Production ==
The film was the first film that Neil Fitzmaurice wrote. The film was shot in and around Liverpool.

== Release ==
=== Awards and nominations ===
Year	Award	Category	Nominee(s)	Result	Ref.
2000	British Independent Film Awards	Achievement in production	Douglas Hickox	Nominated	
2000	British Independent Film Awards	Best Newcomer (Off screen)	Damian Bromley	Nominated	
2000	British Independent Film Awards	Best Newcomer (On screen)	Neil Fitzmaurice	Nominated	
