= Chiwetel Ejiofor =

British actor (born 1977)

Chiwetel Ejiofor CBE
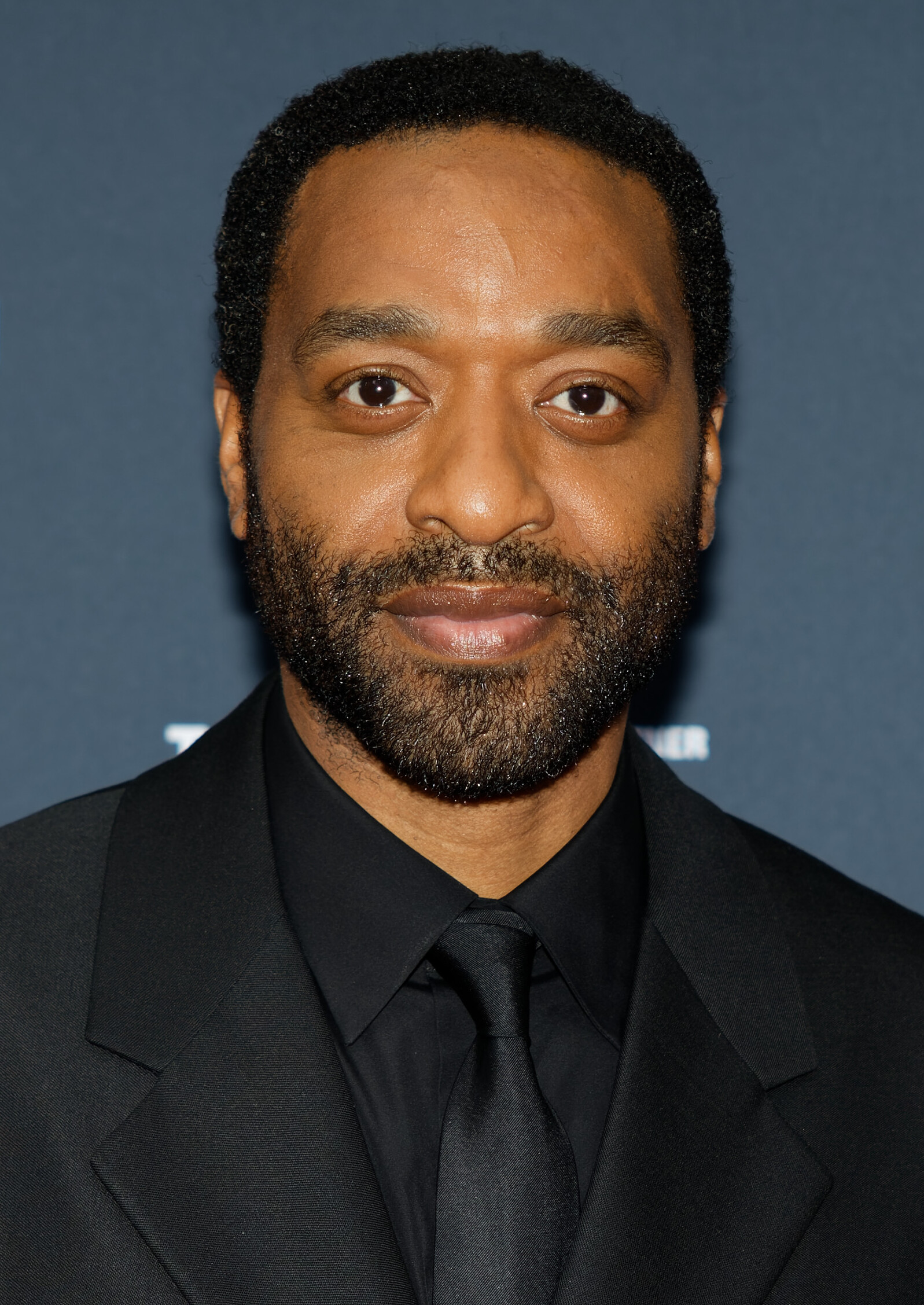
- Ejiofor in 2024
- Born: Chiwetel Umeadi Ejiofor; 10 July 1977 (age 49); London, England
- Education: Dulwich College; London Academy of Music and Dramatic Art
- Occupation: Actor • director
- Years active: 1995–present
- Relatives: Zain Asher (sister)
- Awards: Full list

Chiwetel Umeadi Ejiofor (Note: /ˈtʃuːətɛl ˈɛdʒioʊfɔːr/ CHOO-ə-tel EJ-ee-oh-for; Igbo pronunciation) (born 10 July 1977) is a British actor and director. He is the recipient of various accolades, including a British Academy Film Award and a Laurence Olivier Award, in addition to nominations for an Academy Award, two Primetime Emmy Awards, and five Golden Globe Awards. In 2008, he was appointed an Officer of the Order of the British Empire (OBE), and in 2015, he was advanced to Commander (CBE) for his services to the arts.

After enrolling at the National Youth Theatre in 1995 and attending the London Academy of Music and Dramatic Art, at age 19 and three months into his course, Ejiofor was cast by Steven Spielberg to play a supporting role in the film Amistad (1997) as James Covey. He later won the Laurence Olivier Award for Best Actor for Othello (2008). Ejiofor earned the BAFTA Award for Best Actor as well as a nomination for the Academy Award for Best Actor for his portrayal of Solomon Northup in 12 Years a Slave (2013).

Ejiofor's other films include Dirty Pretty Things (2002), Love Actually (2003), Kinky Boots (2005), Four Brothers (2005), Serenity (2005), Children of Men (2006), Endgame (2009), 2012 (2009), Salt (2010), Savannah (2013), The Martian (2015), Venom: The Last Dance (2024), and Backrooms (2026). He joined the Marvel Cinematic Universe playing Karl Mordo in Doctor Strange (2016) and Doctor Strange in the Multiverse of Madness (2022). He also voiced Scar in The Lion King (2019). He directed, wrote, and starred in the films The Boy Who Harnessed the Wind (2019) and Rob Peace (2024).

On television, he was nominated for a Primetime Emmy Award for Outstanding Lead Actor for his performance as a jazz band leader in the BBC Two miniseries Dancing on the Edge (2014). He also acted in the BBC drama series The Shadow Line (2011), the HBO television film Phil Spector (2013), and the Showtime science fiction series The Man Who Fell to Earth (2022).

== Early life and education ==
Ejiofor was born on 10 July 1977 in Forest Gate in the East End of London, to middle-class Nigerian parents of Igbo descent. His father, Arinze, was a doctor, and his mother, Obiajulu, was a pharmacist. His younger sister, Zain, is a CNN correspondent. His other sister, Kandi, is a general practitioner doctor.

In 1988, when Ejiofor was 11 years old, during a family trip to Nigeria for a wedding, he and his father were driving to Lagos after the celebrations when their car was involved in a head-on crash with a lorry. His father was killed, and Ejiofor was badly injured, receiving scars that are still visible on his forehead.

He began acting in school plays at his junior school, Dulwich Prep & Senior, where he played the gravedigger in William Shakespeare's Hamlet. Ejiofor continued acting at his senior school, Dulwich College, and joined the National Youth Theatre. He was accepted into the London Academy of Music and Dramatic Art but left after his first year, after being cast in Steven Spielberg's film Amistad.

== Career ==
=== 1996–2007: Career beginnings and early recognition ===
Ejiofor made his film debut in the television film Deadly Voyage (1996). He went on to become a stage actor in London. He played the title role in Othello at the Bloomsbury Theatre in September 1995, and again at the Theatre Royal, Glasgow, in 1996, when he starred opposite Rachael Stirling in her role as Desdemona.

In Steven Spielberg's 1997 film Amistad, he gave support to Djimon Hounsou's Cinque as interpreter Ensign James Covey. In 1999, Ejiofor appeared in the British film G:MT – Greenwich Mean Time. In 2000, he starred in Blue/Orange at the Royal National Theatre (Cottesloe stage), and later at the Duchess Theatre. That same year, his performance as Romeo in William Shakespeare's Romeo and Juliet was nominated for the Ian Charleson Award. Ejiofor was awarded the Jack Tinker Award for Most Promising Newcomer at the Critics' Circle Theatre Awards in 2000. For his performance in Blue/Orange, Ejiofor received the London Evening Standard Theatre Award for Outstanding Newcomer in 2000 and a nomination for the Laurence Olivier Award for Best Supporting Actor in 2001.

Ejiofor had his first leading film role playing Nicky Burkett in Jeremy Cameron's It Was an Accident (2000). In 2002, he starred in Dirty Pretty Things, for which he won a British Independent Film Award for best actor. In the following year, he was part of the ensemble cast of Love Actually, starred in a BBC adaptation of Chaucer's The Knight's Tale and also starred on the BBC series Trust. Also in 2003, he starred in the lead role of Augustus in the radio production of Rita Dove's poetic drama "The Darker Face of the Earth", which premiered on the BBC World Service on 23 August of that year, marking the International Day for the Remembrance of the Slave Trade and its Abolition. He starred alongside Hilary Swank in Red Dust (2004), portraying the fictional politician Alex Mpondo in post-apartheid South Africa.

He played the central role of Prince Alamayou in Peter Spafford's radio play I Was a Stranger, broadcast on BBC Radio 4 on 17 May 2004, and he played the god Dionysus, alongside Paul Scofield's Cadmus and Diana Rigg's Agave, in Andrew Rissik's play, Dionysus, based upon Euripides' Bacchae, also broadcast by the BBC. He also received acclaim for his performance as a complex antagonist, The Operative, in the film Serenity (2005). Ejiofor played a revolutionary in the film Children of Men (2006). His singing and acting performance in Kinky Boots received a Golden Globe Award and a British Independent Film Award nomination. He was also nominated for the BAFTA Orange Rising Star Award in 2006, which recognises emerging British film talent. Ejiofor's performance in Tsunami: The Aftermath received a Golden Globe Award nomination for Best Actor – Miniseries or Television Film in 2007.

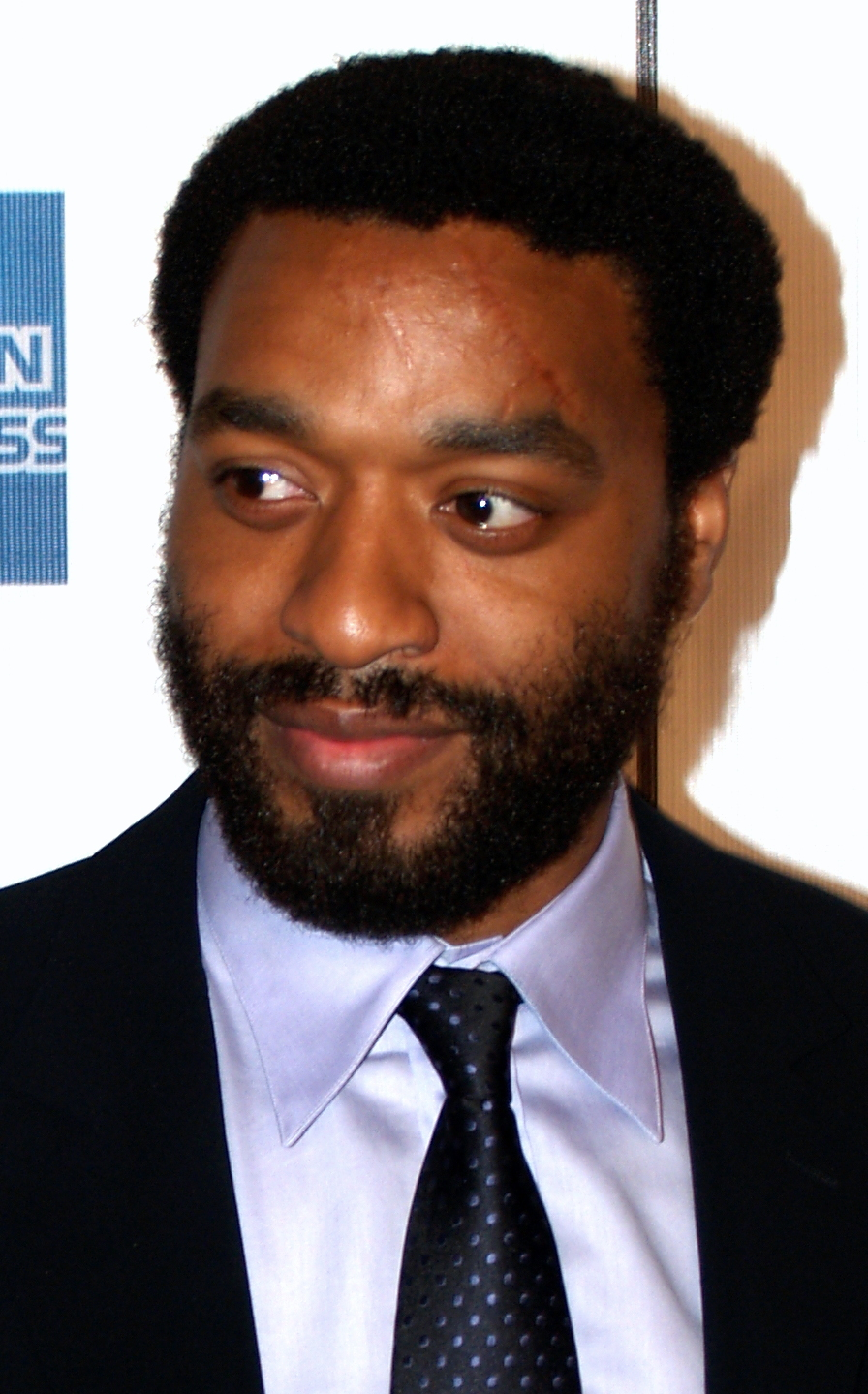
Ejiofor at the 2008 Tribeca Film Festival premiere of Redbelt

In 2007, Ejiofor starred opposite Don Cheadle in Talk to Me, a film based on the true story of Ralph "Petey" Greene (played by Cheadle), an African-American radio personality in the 1960s and 1970s. He performed on stage in The Seagull at the Royal Court Theatre from 18 January to 17 March 2007, and later that year reprised his role as Othello at the Donmar Warehouse, alongside Kelly Reilly as Desdemona and Ewan McGregor as Iago. The production received favourable reviews, with particularly strong praise for Ejiofor. "Chiwetel Ejiofor produces one of the most memorable performances of Othello in recent years." He was awarded the Laurence Olivier Award for Best Actor for his performance. He also narrated the BBC television film Partition: The Day India Burned (2007), which was based on the Partition of India. He starred as Mike Terry in the 2008 cult film Redbelt that received favourable reviews.

=== 2008–2018: International recognition and critical acclaim ===
Ejiofor was appointed Officer of the Order of the British Empire (OBE) in the 2008 Birthday Honours. In the same year, he made his directorial debut in the short film Slapper, which he also wrote, based on an idea by editor/director Yusuf Pirhasan. Ejiofor appeared alongside John Cusack in the film 2012 (2009). The film went on to gross over $700 million and is among the list of highest-grossing films of all time placing 5th among the top films of 2009. He played CIA officer Darryl Peabody in Salt (2010), and the Golden Globe Award-nominated leading role of band creator Louis Lester on the BBC Two drama series Dancing on the Edge (2013), which played on Starz in the United States.

In 2013, Ejiofor took on the role of Solomon Northup in 12 Years a Slave. The film was based on Northup's memoir, edited in 1968 by historians Sue Eakin and Joseph Logsdon, of Northup's experience as a free black man in New York, who was kidnapped in 1841 and sold into slavery in Louisiana. On casting, director Steve McQueen said:

Chiwetel Ejiofor was always going to be Solomon Northup for me. I was looking for someone who had that genteelness, that kind of humanity. Knowing that humanity was going to be tested under certain duress and circumstances, I needed someone who could actually keep hold of that, even through periods of extraordinary trying and extraordinary situations where it would be tested to its absolute limit. He was the only person.

At the Toronto International Film Festival, Ejiofor said he briefly hesitated about playing Northup. "You wait all your life for a great script to come through the door. You're hassling your agent and all that, and then it comes, and you read it, and your first reaction surprises you. Your first reaction being, 'Can I do this?'" He accepted the role about 24 hours later. As part of his preparation for the role, Ejiofor learned to play the violin, collected slave stories, maintained a slave's edge-up hairstyle, and engaged in some of the physical labour Northup was subjected to, including cotton picking. Since he had not worked with McQueen before, Ejiofor also observed the working dynamic between the director and co-star Michael Fassbender, who worked with McQueen on Hunger (2008) and Shame (2011). On playing Northup, Ejiofor felt a responsibility, not being American, to get the story of Solomon Northup's story as accurately as he could, adding, "I've been very grateful to show the film to his descendants and see them be so proud of it."

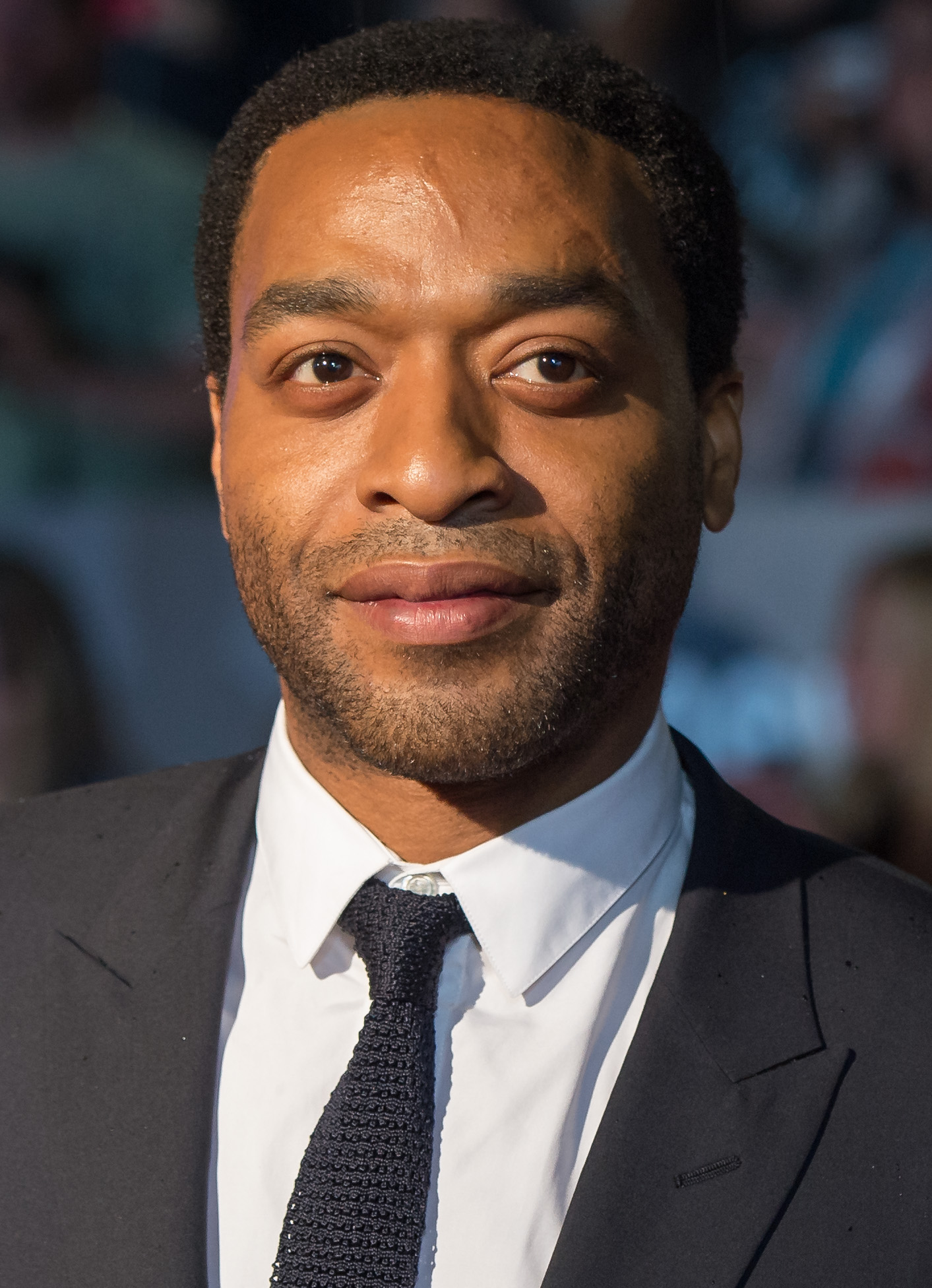
Ejiofor in 2015

12 Years a Slave opened to wide acclaim, with many critics citing Ejiofor's performance and declaring him an almost-certain Academy Award nominee for Best Actor. From Owen Gleiberman at Entertainment Weekly: "It is Chiwetel Ejiofor's extraordinary performance that holds the movie together, and that allows us to watch it without blinking. He plays Solomon with a powerful inner strength, yet he never soft-pedals the silent nightmare that is Solomon's daily existence." From Christopher Orr at The Atlantic: "Ejiofor has given notable performances in the past (Dirty Pretty Things, Serenity, Talk to Me), but this is by far his most essential role to date. Stoic, watchful, compromising himself just enough to stay alive, he is the point of stillness and decency around which spin the madnesses of the film." In his The Hollywood Reporter review, Todd McCarthy wrote, "Ejiofor is terrific in a demanding character who's put through the wringer physically, mentally, and emotionally." On 16 January 2014, Ejiofor was officially nominated for Best Actor for the 86th Academy Awards on 2 March.

As of September 2013, Ejiofor was slated to portray Patrice Lumumba in a film adaptation of Aimé Césaire's A Season in the Congo, a role in which he had performed on stage at the Young Vic. Joe Wright, who directed the play, was also to direct the film.

In 2014, Ejiofor starred in the Nigerian film Half of a Yellow Sun alongside Thandiwe Newton. It was announced in June 2014 that Ejiofor would play real-life drug dealer Thomas McFadden in a film based on the book Marching Powder: A True Story of Friendship, Cocaine, and South America's Strangest Jail, written by McFadden and Australian journalist Rusty Young. In 2016, Ejiofor co-starred with his friend Benedict Cumberbatch and played Karl Mordo in the Marvel Cinematic Universe film Doctor Strange. That same year, it was announced that he would play Peter in the upcoming film Mary Magdalene, written by Helen Edmundson and directed by Garth Davis.

=== 2019–present ===
On 1 November 2017, Ejiofor was officially chosen for the role of Scar for the animated remake of The Lion King (2019) directed by Jon Favreau. Played by Jeremy Irons in the 1994 animated film, Ejiofor described Scar as more "psychologically possessed" and "brutalized" than in the original. Ejiofor stated, "especially with Scar, whether it's a vocal quality that allows for a certain confidence or a certain aggression, to always know that at the end of it you're playing somebody who has the capacity to turn everything on its head in a split second with outrageous acts of violence – that can completely change the temperature of a scene." He also said that "[Scar and Mufasa's] relationship is completely destroyed and brutalized by Scar's way of thinking. He's possessed with this disease of his own ego and his own want." Favreau said of casting Ejiofor, "[He] is just a fantastic actor, who brings us a bit of the mid-Atlantic cadence and a new take on the character. He brings that feeling of a Shakespearean villain to bear because of his background as an actor. It's wonderful when you have somebody as experienced and seasoned as Chiwetel; he just breathes such wonderful life into this character." Ejiofor narrated the 2019 documentary film The Elephant Queen. In 2019, Ejiofor made his feature directorial debut with The Boy Who Harnessed the Wind, adapted from the memoir of the same name by William Kamkwamba, about a boy who built a wind-powered water pump in Malawi. In 2022, Ejiofor returned to the role of Mordo for the sequel film Doctor Strange in the Multiverse of Madness. Alongside Emilia Clarke, Ejiofor played Alvy in The Pod Generation in 2023. In 2025, Ejiofor stars as Scott Walliker, a teacher in Bridget Jones: Mad About the Boy. Ejiofor stars as Clark in the 2026 film Backrooms.

== Personal life ==
In 2015, Ejiofor was honoured with a Global Promise Award by The GEANCO Foundation, a non-profit welfare organisation in West Africa, for his charity work in Nigeria. His work aims to reach the less privileged, especially young girls whom he described as being "marginalized educationally, emotionally, physically.”

On 12 September 2016, Ejiofor, as well as Cate Blanchett, Jesse Eisenberg, Peter Capaldi, Douglas Booth, Neil Gaiman, Keira Knightley, Juliet Stevenson, Kit Harington, and Stanley Tucci, featured in a video from the United Nations' refugee agency UNHCR to help raise awareness of the global refugee crisis. The video, titled "What They Took With Them", has the actors reading a poem, written by Jenifer Toksvig and inspired by primary accounts of real refugees, and is part of UNHCR's #WithRefugees campaign, which also includes a petition to governments to expand asylum to provide further shelter, integrating job opportunities, and education.

Ejiofor is a supporter of Crystal Palace F.C.

== Acting credits ==
Key
| † | Denotes works that have not yet been released |

=== Film ===
| Year | Title | Role | Director | Notes | Ref. |
|---|---|---|---|---|---|
| 1997 | Amistad | Ensign James Covey | Steven Spielberg | | |
| 1999 | G:MT – Greenwich Mean Time | Rix | John Strickland | | |
| 2000 | It Was an Accident | Nicky Burkett | Metin Hüseyin | | |
| 2002 | Dirty Pretty Things | Okwe lander | Stephen Frears | | |
| 2003 | Love Actually | Peter | Richard Curtis | | |
| 2003 | Three Blind Mice | Mark Hayward | Mathias Ledoux | | |
| 2004 | She Hate Me | Frank Wills | Spike Lee | | |
| 2004 | Red Dust | Alex Mpondo | Tom Hooper | | |
| 2004 | Melinda and Melinda | Ellis Moonsong | Woody Allen | | |
| 2005 | Four Brothers | Victor Sweet | John Singleton | | |
| 2005 | Serenity | The Operative | Joss Whedon | | |
| 2005 | Slow Burn | Ty Trippin | Wayne Beach | | |
| 2005 | Kinky Boots | Simon / Lola | Julian Jarrold | | |
| 2006 | Inside Man | Detective Bill Mitchell | Spike Lee | | |
| 2006 | Children of Men | Luke | Alfonso Cuarón | | |
| 2007 | Talk to Me | Dewey Hughes | Kasi Lemmons | | |
| 2007 | American Gangster | Huey Lucas | Ridley Scott | | |
| 2008 | Redbelt | Mike Terry | David Mamet | | |
| 2008 | Slapper | | Himself | Short film; writer, director | |
| 2009 | Endgame | Thabo Mbeki | Pete Travis | | |
| 2009 | 2012 | Adrian Helmsley | Roland Emmerich | | |
| 2010 | Salt | Darryl Peabody | Phillip Noyce | | |
| 2013 | Savannah | Christmas Moultrie | Annette Haywood-Carter | | |
| 2013 | 12 Years a Slave | Solomon Northup | Steve McQueen | | |
| 2013 | Half of a Yellow Sun | Odenigbo | Biyi Bandele | | |
| 2015 | Z for Zachariah | John Loomis | Craig Zobel | | |
| 2015 | The Martian | Vincent Kapoor | Ridley Scott | | |
| 2015 | Secret in Their Eyes | Ray Kasten | Billy Ray | | |
| 2016 | Triple 9 | Michael Atwood | John Hillcoat | | |
| 2016 | Doctor Strange | Karl Mordo | Scott Derrickson | | |
| 2018 | Come Sunday | Carlton Pearson | Joshua Marston | | |
| 2018 | Mary Magdalene | Peter | Garth Davis | | |
| 2018 | Sherlock Gnomes | Gnome Watson (voice) | John Stevenson | | |
| 2019 | The Boy Who Harnessed the Wind | Trywell Kamkwamba | Himself | Also writer and director | |
| 2019 | The Lion King | Scar (voice) | Jon Favreau | | |
| 2019 | Maleficent: Mistress of Evil | Conall | Joachim Rønning | | |
| 2019 | The Elephant Queen | Narrator | Victoria Stone/Mark Deeble | | |
| 2020 | The Old Guard | Copley | Gina Prince-Bythewood | | |
| 2021 | Locked Down | Paxton | Doug Liman | | |
| 2021 | Infinite | Bathurst 2020 | Antoine Fuqua | | |
| 2022 | Doctor Strange in the Multiverse of Madness | Karl Mordo (Earth-838) | Sam Raimi | | |
| 2023 | The Pod Generation | Alvy Novy | Sophie Barthes | | |
| 2024 | Rob Peace | Skeet Douglas | Himself | Also writer and director | |
| 2024 | The Life of Chuck | Marty Anderson | Mike Flanagan | | |
| 2024 | Venom: The Last Dance | Rex Strickland | Kelly Marcel | | |
| 2025 | Bridget Jones: Mad About the Boy | Mr. Wallaker | Michael Morris | | |
| 2025 | Eleanor the Great | Roger | Scarlett Johansson | | |
| 2025 | The Old Guard 2 | Copley | Victoria Mahoney | | |
| 2026 | Backrooms | Clark | Kane Parsons | | |
| 2027 | Children of Blood and Bone † | King Saran | Gina Prince-Bythewood | Post-production | |
| 2027 | The Exorcist: Martyrs † | Father William | Mike Flanagan | Post-production | |

=== Television ===
| Year | Title | Role | Notes | Ref. |
|---|---|---|---|---|
| 1996 | Deadly Voyage | Ebow | Television film | |
| 2001 | Murder in Mind | DS McCorkindale | Episode: "Teacher" | |
| 2003 | Twelfth Night | Orsino | Television film | |
| 2003 | Trust | Ashley Carter | 6 episodes | |
| 2003 | The Canterbury Tales | Paul | Segment: The Knight's Tale | |
| 2006 | Tsunami: The Aftermath | Ian Carter | Television film | |
| 2007 | Partition: The Day India Burned | Narrator | | |
| 2011 | The Shadow Line | Jonah Gabriel | 7 episodes | |
| 2013 | Dancing on the Edge | Louis Lester | 6 episodes | |
| 2013 | Phil Spector | Mock Prosecutor | Television film | |
| 2017 | Red Nose Day Actually | Peter | Television short film | |
| 2022 | The Man Who Fell to Earth | Faraday | Main role | |
| 2026 | Star Trek: Starfleet Academy | Maker | Episode: Series Acclimation Mil"; Voice | |

=== Theatre ===
| Year | Title | Role | Notes | Ref. |
|---|---|---|---|---|
| 1995 | Othello | Othello | Bloomsbury Theatre | |
| 1996 | Othello | Othello | Theatre Royal, Glasgow | |
| 1997 | Macbeth | Malcolm | Bristol Old Vic | |
| 1999 | Sparkleshark | Russell | Royal National Theatre | |
| 2000 | Blue/Orange | Chris | Royal National Theatre | |
| 2000 | Romeo and Juliet | Romeo | Royal National Theatre | |
| 2000 | Peer Gynt | Young Peer | Royal National Theatre | |
| 2002 | The Vortex | Nicky Lancaster | Donmar Warehouse | |
| 2007 | The Seagull | Boris Alexeyevich Trigorin | Royal Court Theatre | |
| 2007 | Othello | Othello | Donmar Warehouse | |
| 2013 | A Season in the Congo | Patrice Lumumba | Young Vic | |
| 2015 | Everyman | Everyman | Royal National Theatre | |

== Awards and nominations ==
Ejiofor is the recipient of several awards, including numerous nominations in the Best Actor category for his role as Solomon Northup in the 2013 biographical drama film 12 Years a Slave. In 2008, he was appointed Officer of the Order of the British Empire (OBE) by Queen Elizabeth II for services to the arts. He was elevated to Commander of the Order of the British Empire (CBE) in the 2015 Birthday Honours. In February 2024, Ejiofor was awarded an honorary degree from the School of Advanced Study in recognition of the 25 plus years on stage and screen and dedication to the dramatic arts.

== See also ==
- List of British actors
- List of British Academy Award nominees and winners
- List of Black Academy Award winners and nominees
- List of actors with Academy Award nominations
