= The Elephant Queen =

2019 documentary film

- Film poster
- Directed by: Victoria Stone; Mark Deeble
- Produced by: Lucinda Englehart
- Narrated by: Chiwetel Ejiofor
- Music by: Alex Heffes
- Production companies: Mister Smith Entertainment; Deeble & Stone
- Distributed by: Apple TV+; A24; Altitude Film Distribution
- Release dates: September 8, 2018 (TIFF); November 1, 2019 (Apple TV+)
- Running time: 96 minutes
- Countries: United Kingdom; Kenya

The Elephant Queen is a 2018 documentary film directed by Victoria Stone and Mark Deeble, and narrated by Chiwetel Ejiofor. It tells the journey of a family of elephants in the African savannah when they are forced to leave their waterhole. The film was produced by Lucinda Englehart under the banner of Deeble & Stone.

At the 2019 Critics' Choice Movie Awards, The Elephant Queen was nominated for Best Science/Nature Documentary and Best Narration.

== Plot ==
Athena, a 50-year-old mother elephant, is matriarch of a herd of adult females and male and female juveniles, which includes mother Mala, older daughter Milli, and newborn Mimi. The elephants live in a bucolic area referred to as The Kingdom, with dotted waterholes. The waterholes are also home to bullfrogs, chameleons, dung beetles, killifish, and terrapins. In The Elephant Queen, the animals are characters with personalities who live in symbiotic harmony. A drought forces the herd to leave their environment and travel far away to a savanna. But they must eat and drink plenty to endure 200 miles (320 km) until the next waterhole. Matriarch Athena has the hard decision to wait for Mimi to get stronger for the long trip, or to voyage on towards her and her family’s safety.

== Cast ==
English actor Chiwetel Ejiofor narrates the journey of the elephant family.

== Production ==
Directors Deeble and Stone stated that they never filmed elephants before as main subjects. In 2009, a drought hit Amboseli National Park, Kenya, which "opened their eyes" to tell the elephants' story. While talking about their immersive experience of capturing African elephants' life, the duo said:

We were looking for a charismatic female elephant matriarch because it's very much a female leadership story, and we were looking for the ideal elephant for a long time.

— Victoria Stone and Mark Deeble, Deadline Hollywood

The duo followed the elephant Athena and her herd for over four years in Tsavo East National Park, Kenya.

== Release ==
On 8 September 2018, The Elephant Queen premiered at the Toronto International Film Festival. The film would later screen at the BFI London Film Festival, Sundance Film Festival, Montclair Film Festival and Sydney Film Festival. The Elephant Queen opened in theatres on 18 October 2019 as a pilot to a deal between A24 and Apple, where A24 would distribute films through a limited release in US theaters before becoming Apple TV+ exclusives. That same day, they released The Lighthouse, hence priority at A24 shifted to that film, and a small release was made for The Elephant Queen with little to no marketing. The film was made available for streaming on Apple TV+ on 1 November 2019. It later also had its one-time linear premiere in its country of production, on Citizen TV in parts of sub-Saharan Africa on 12 April 2020. Thusly, rendering it non-exclusive in those countries.

== Reception ==
=== Critical response ===
On the review aggregator Rotten Tomatoes, the film holds an approval rating of 91% based on 22 reviews, with an average rating of 7.8/10. The website's critical consensus reads, "Informative, compassionate, and beautifully filmed, The Elephant Queen should satisfy nature documentary lovers of all ages." Metacritic, which uses a weighted average, assigned the film a score of 67 out of 100, based on 7 critics, indicating "Generally favorable reviews".

Frank Scheck of The Hollywood Reporter wrote that the film "delivers a powerful reminder that the magnificent subjects of this documentary [...] are faced with serious dangers both natural and man-made". Sandie Angulo Chen of Common Sense Media wrote, "Gorgeously shot, fabulously narrated, and surprisingly poignant, this documentary is an inspiring tribute to the power of motherhood and community on the African savanna". Scott Tobias of Variety magazine wrote, "There's a gap between the story Stone and Deeble want to tell about love and family, and the much grimmer story nature itself is telling, in unsentimental terms. In the end, it's hard to reconcile the two". Chelsea Phillips-Carr of Point of View wrote, "The documentary is without a doubt charming, but it is also too innocuous for its subject matter".

=== Accolades ===
Year	Award	Category	Result	Ref(s).
2019	Cinema for Peace Awards	International Green Film Award	Won	
2019	Critics' Choice Documentary Awards	Best Science/Nature Documentary	Nominated	
2019	Critics' Choice Documentary Awards	Best Narration	Nominated	
2020	Primetime Emmy Awards	Outstanding Narrator	Nominated	
