= It Was an Accident =

2000 British comedy film

- Film poster
- Directed by: Metin Hüseyin
- Written by: Ol Parker
- Based on: It Was an Accident by Jeremy Cameron
- Produced by: Paul Goodman
- Starring: Thandiwe Newton; Chiwetel Ejiofor; Max Beesley; James Bolam
- Production companies: Litmus Productions; Pathe Pictures; Canal Plus; Arts Council of England
- Release date: 27 October 2000
- Running time: 97 minutes
- Country: United Kingdom
- Language: English

It Was an Accident is a 2000 British comedy film directed by Metin Hüseyin, written by Ol Parker and produced by Paul Goodman, based on the novel of the same name by Jeremy Cameron and starring Thandiwe Newton, Chiwetel Ejiofor, Max Beesley and James Bolam. In the film, an ex-convict, trying to go straight, accidentally gets mixed up in a fresh series of crimes.

== Cast ==
- Chiwetel Ejiofor as Nicky Burkett
- Max Beesley as Mickey Cousins
- James Bolam as Vernon Fitch
- Nicola Stapleton as Kelly
- Neil Dudgeon as Holdsworth
- Hugh Quarshie as George Hurlock
- Thandiwe Newton as Noreen Hurlock (credited as Thandie Newton)
- Jacqueline Williams as Sharon
- Sidh Solanki as Rameez
- Cavan Clerkin as Jimmy
- Sally Chattaway as Terri
- Paul Chowdhry as Rafiq Roy
