= Kinky Boots (film) =

2005 British comedy-drama film

- Theatrical release poster
- Directed by: Julian Jarrold
- Written by: Geoff Deane; Tim Firth
- Produced by: Suzanne Mackie; Nick Barton; Peter Ettedgui; Mairi Brett
- Starring: Joel Edgerton; Chiwetel Ejiofor; Sarah-Jane Potts; Jemima Rooper; Linda Bassett; Nick Frost; Robert Pugh
- Cinematography: Eigil Bryld
- Edited by: Emma E. Hickox
- Music by: Adrian Johnston
- Production companies: Miramax Films; Harbour Pictures
- Distributed by: Buena Vista International
- Release dates: October 7, 2005 (United Kingdom); April 14, 2006 (United States)
- Running time: 107 minutes
- Country: United Kingdom
- Language: English
- Box office: $10 million

Kinky Boots is a 2005 British comedy-drama film directed by Julian Jarrold and written by Geoff Deane and Tim Firth. The film, based on true events, tells of struggling shoe factory owner Charlie, who forms an unlikely partnership with Lola, a drag queen, to save the business. Charlie develops a plan to produce custom footwear for drag queens, rather than the men's dress shoes that his firm is known for, alienating many in the process.

The film received mixed reviews from critics, and later developed a cult following and inspired the 2013 stage musical of the same name.

== Plot ==
In Northampton, in the East Midlands of England, Charlie Price is attempting to save his family's shoe factory, which has been floundering since his father's death. While laying off workers, one of them, Lauren, gives Charlie the idea of looking for a niche market product to save the business.

On a business trip to London to sell the company's surplus stock, Charlie encounters a drag queen being harassed by drunken hoodlums and intervenes to his detriment. He wakes up in the dressing room of Lola, the drag performer and alter ego of Simon. Charlie is intrigued when Lola's high heel snaps, and proposes to create high heeled boots that can support a greater range of foot sizes and body types. Charlie then recruits Lauren to assist him in designing boots for drag performers.

When their initial designs are met with scorn by Lola, they bring her on as a consultant. The road is initially bumpy: many of the male employees are uncomfortable with Lola's presence and the new direction. One of them, Don, changes his mindset after Lola secretly allowed him to win an arm wrestling match, to save Don from mockery. Things improve further when Lola tones down her personality and starts making friends.

Charlie's relationship with his fiancée, Nicola, begins to deteriorate as she encourages him to sell the factory building to a developer, and matters take a turn for the worse when Charlie is invited to showcase the new boots in Milan; the strain he puts on his employees causes most of them, including Lola, to walk out.

Charlie's fiancée arrives at the factory, furious that he took out a second mortgage on their house to save the company. Nicola insists that he sell the company, but Charlie is determined to save it and the jobs of his employees. The argument (which ends with Nicola leaving Charlie) is overheard by the staff. Don rallies the factory workers to make the boots in time for Charlie and Lauren to get to Milan.

When Charlie catches Nicola with another man, he angrily takes out his frustrations on Lola, causing Lola to quit. After arriving in Milan with no one to model the boots, Charlie is forced to go onstage and do so himself. He falls flat on his face, just as Lola and her posse of drag queens arrive, putting on a spectacular runway show to save the day.

In the film's denouement, Lola headlines her own show and sings a song in honour of the "kinky boots factory" of Northampton. Most of the key workers are in attendance and enjoying themselves, including Charlie and Lauren, who have become a couple.

== Cast ==
- Joel Edgerton as Charlie Price
  - Sebastian Hurst-Palmer as Young Charlie Price
- Chiwetel Ejiofor as Lola/Simon
  - Courtney Phillips as Young Lola/Simon
- Sarah-Jane Potts as Lauren
- Jemima Rooper as Nicola Marsden
- Nick Frost as Don Burton
- Linda Bassett as Melanie
- Robert Pugh as Harold Price
- Ewan Hooper as George
- Stephen Marcus as Big Mike
- Mona Hammond as Pat
- Kellie Bright as Jeannie
- Joanna Scanlan as Trish
- Geoffrey Streatfeild as Richard Bailey
- Leo Bill as Harry Sampson

== Background ==
An episode of BBC2 documentary series Trouble at the Top, broadcast on 24 February 1999, inspired the film. It featured Steve Pateman who was struggling with possible closure of W.J. Brooks Ltd, a family-controlled shoe factory in Earls Barton, Northamptonshire, that soon catered to the market of men wearing traditionally women's shoes, such as black patent boots, under the "Divine" brand. Many of the film's scenes were filmed in the factory used by Tricker's in Northampton.

It is mentioned in management as an example of agility and customer centricity.

== Soundtrack ==
The Kinky Boots: Original Soundtrack was released on April 11, 2006, by Hollywood Records.

1. "Whatever Lola Wants" – Chiwetel Ejiofor (2:12)
2. "In These Shoes" – Kirsty MacColl (3:39)
3. "I Want to Be Evil" – Chiwetel Ejiofor (2:34)
4. "Mr. Big Stuff" – Lyn Collins (4:00)
5. "It's a Man's Man's Man's World" – James Brown (3:17)
6. "I Put a Spell on You" – Nina Simone (2:36)
7. "The Prettiest Star" – David Bowie (3:09)
8. "Together We Are Beautiful" – Chiwetel Ejiofor (4:10)
9. "Yes Sir I Can Boogie" – Chiwetel Ejiofor (4:20)
10. "Wild Is the Wind" – Nina Simone (6:59)
11. "The Red Shoes" – Adrian Johnston (4:26)
12. "Steel Shank" – Adrian Johnston (3:39)
13. "Free to Walk" – Adrian Johnston (3:39)

The following songs are included in the film but are not on the Original Soundtrack:

- “My Heart Belongs to Daddy" – Chiwetel Ejiofor
- “These Boots Are Made for Walkin'” – Chiwetel Ejiofor
- "Cha Cha Heels" - Chiwetel Ejiofor
- "Summer Holiday" – Jemima Rooper

== Release ==
=== Critical response ===
The film received mixed reviews on release, with critics decrying the "formulaic Britcom plot". On the review aggregator website Rotten Tomatoes, the film has an approval rating of 58% based on 112 reviews, with an average rating of 5.9/10. The website's critics consensus reads: "Kinky Boots relies heavily on the Full Monty formula of Britcoms, while playing it too safe in a desperate attempt not to offend. Ejiofor's performance is its redeeming virtue." On Metacritic it has a weighted average score of 57% based on reviews from 31 critics, indicating "mixed or average" reviews.

=== Box office ===
The film achieved a box office gross of $10 million worldwide.

== Awards ==
Chiwetel Ejiofor was nominated for Best Actor – Motion Picture Musical or Comedy at the 64th Golden Globe Awards.

The film won the Audience Award for Best Comedy at the 2006 Indianapolis Film Festival.

== Musical adaptation ==
A stage musical adaptation debuted on Broadway in April 2013, following an out-of-town try-out at the Bank of America Theatre in Chicago. The songs were composed by Cyndi Lauper, and the book co-written by Harvey Fierstein, director Jerry Mitchell was also the choreographer. The Chicago cast included eventual Broadway cast members Billy Porter and Stark Sands. At the 67th Tony Awards (2013), the Broadway production won six Tony Awards, including Best Original Score (Lauper, first sole female winner), Best Actor (Porter) and Best Musical. As of September 2024, a feature film adaptation of the musical is being planned.

== See also ==
- Cross-dressing in film and television
- Transvestism
