= Jonathan Cake =

English actor (born 1967)

- Born: Jonathan James Cake; 31 August 1967 (age 59); Worthing, West Sussex, England
- Occupation: Actor
- Years active: 1992–present
- Spouse: Julianne Nicholson (m. 2004)
- Children: 2

Jonathan James Cake (born 31 August 1967) is an English actor who has worked on various TV programmes and films. His notable screen roles include Jack Favell in Rebecca (1997), Oswald Mosley in Mosley (1998), Japheth in the NBC television film Noah's Ark (1999), Tyrannus in the ABC miniseries Empire (2005), and Det. Chuck Vance on the ABC drama series Desperate Housewives (2011–2012).

== Early life ==
Cake was born in Worthing, Sussex. His father was a glassware importer and his mother a school administrator. He is the youngest of three boys.

When he was four years old he was invited on stage during a traditional British pantomime for children. This exposure ignited his interest in the performing arts. By the age of eight Jonathan had taken drama classes and took part in plays. As a teenager he toured Britain with London's National Youth Theatre.

After leaving school Cake studied English at Corpus Christi College, Cambridge. He became a rugby player in college and graduated in 1989. He attended a two-year training programme at the Bristol Old Vic Theatre School, then trained with the Royal Shakespeare Company.

== Career ==
In 1992, Jonathan Cake appeared in William Shakespeare's play As You Like It, a Royal Shakespeare Company production at the Royal Shakespeare Theatre in Stratford-upon-Avon. He also performed the play at the Barbican Theatre in London in 1993. Also that year, he appeared in a Royal Shakespeare Company production of Christopher Marlowe's Tamburlaine the Great. He then appeared with the Royal Shakespeare Company in Wallenstein, The Odyssey and Beggar's Opera.

In 1995, Cake acted in the Shared Experience Theatre Company production of George Eliot's novel The Mill on the Floss at London's Lyric Theatre. Cake branched out to the screen when he landed a guest spot in the British TV comedy series Press Gang in 1993. He made his first television film appearance alongside Jasper Carrott and Ann Bryson in BBC's Carrott U Like in 1994 and broke into the film business the following year with a small role in the American film First Knight.

After appearing in episodes of Frank Stubbs Promotes and Goodnight Sweetheart, Cake was cast as Gareth in the BBC series Degrees of Error (1995), opposite Beth Goddard, Julian Glover and Phyllida Law. He then played Ewan in two episodes of the series Grange Hill (1996), Nat in two episodes of Cold Lazarus (1996), and Hattersley in the TV miniseries adaptation of Anne Brontë's The Tenant of Wildfell Hall (1996). He was also cast in the TV films Nightlife (1996, with Katrin Cartlidge and Jane Horrocks), The Girl (1996) and the 1996 pilot episode of Wings (a planned remake of the American show of the same title, with Una Stubbs). Also in 1996, Cake was in True Blue, a British sports film based on the book True Blue: The Oxford Boat Race Mutiny by Daniel Topolski and Patrick Robinson, and in an episode of The Thin Blue Line.

Cake next worked in Cows (1997), played Jack Favell in the 1997 Anglo-German miniseries Rebecca, based on the 1938 novel of the same name by Daphne du Maurier, and portrayed Peter Templer in a TV miniseries adaptation of Anthony Powell's A Dance to the Music of Time (1997), which starred James Purefoy, Simon Russell Beale and Paul Rhys. He also guest starred in Jonathan Creek (1997). The next year, he starred in Mosley, which was based on the life of British fascist Oswald Mosley. He also portrayed Regan Montana in the TV film Diamond Girl and co-starred with Adrian Dunbar and Susan Vidler in the TV series The Jump (both 1998). The actor closed the decade portraying Japheth in the NBC TV film Noah's Ark (1999). He also worked with Maria Aitken and Leslie Grantham in the British TV film The Bench (1999).

In 2000, Cake played Andrew Pryce-Stevens in Honest. He revisited the stage with work in Baby Doll (2000), an adaptation of the film of the same name by Tennessee Williams, and was handed the Barclays Best Actor Award for his performance. The play performed first at the Royal National Theatre and then in London's West End.

Cake next appeared as Randolph Cleveland in an episode of Dr. Terrible's House of Horrible (2001), co-starred with Lara Belmont and Teresa Churcher in the television thriller The Swap (2002), starred as Jack Wellington in the short-lived Fox series The American Embassy (2002), and was cast as Andrea in the British film The One and Only (2002). Still in 2002, Cake made his Broadway debut in the leading role of Jason in the Euripides play Medea.

Cake appeared in the Canadian television film Riverworld (2003), portrayed Dr. Mengele in the Showtime TV film Out of the Ashes (2003), and portrayed John Christow in the 2004 episode "The Hollow" of Agatha Christie's Poirot. He starred as Jason Shepherd in the crime drama Fallen (2004), appeared as Dr. Malcolm Bowers in an episode of NBC's Inconceivable called "Sex, Lies and Sonograms" (2005), and portrayed Alastair Campbell in the TV film The Government Inspector (2005). He was also cast as a gladiator named Tyrannus in the ABC historical TV series Empire, which ran from 28 June 2005 to 26 July 2005.

Cake played the recurring role of Roy in the ABC short-lived drama series Six Degrees (2006–07). He appeared in an episode of Extras called "Sir Ian McKellen" (2006) and played Marshall Crawford in the TV film The Mastersons of Manhattan (2007).

On stage, Cake played Father Flynn in John Patrick Shanley's play Doubt (2005) at the Pasadena Playhouse. He then performed in Coriolanus (2006) at London's Shakespeare's Globe, and was cast in Cymbeline (2007) at the Vivian Beaumont Theater in New York City.

In 2008, Cake played Rex Mottram in Brideshead Revisited. He had a two episode role in Law & Order: Criminal Intent, alongside his real life wife Julianne Nicholson. The next year, he appeared as Bishop in the ABC TV film Captain Cook's Extraordinary Atlas, starring Jodelle Ferland, Charlie McDermott and Hal Holbrook. He played Cole Barker in two episodes of the NBC series Chuck called "Chuck Versus the Beefcake" and "Chuck Versus the Lethal Weapon". Cake appeared as Marcus Woll in the Law & Order episodes "Boy Gone Astray" and "For the Defense".

In 2010, Cake teamed up with Pedro Miguel Arce in the American film Krews, by Hilbert Hakim. The same year, he also played Mark Easterbrook in an episode of Agatha Christie's Marple called The Pale Horse, starring Julia McKenzie as Miss Marple.

In 2010 Cake had a recurring role in Desperate Housewives as officer Chuck, a love interest of Bree.

Cake appeared as Mark Antony in the Royal Shakespeare Company's production of Antony and Cleopatra in 2013. In 2017, he played the Duke in the Theatre for a New Audience production of Measure for Measure.

In 2021, Cake had a recurring role on Stargirl as Shade.

In 2025 Cake starred in the Sex and the City revival - And Just Like That....

== Personal life ==
On 24 September 2004, Cake married American actress Julianne Nicholson in Italy. The couple have two children. Cake had previously been engaged to British actress Olivia Williams but the relationship ended after seven years.

== Filmography ==
=== Film ===
Year	Title	Role	Notes
1995	First Knight	Sir Gareth	
1996	True Blue	Patrick Conner	
2000	Honest	Andrew Pryce-Stevens	
2002	The One and Only	Sonny	
2008	Brideshead Revisited	Rex Mottram	
2010	Krews	Peter Spanbauer	
2016	Perfect Roast Potatoes	William	Short film
2019	Entangled	Jonas	
2020	Olivier	Olivier	Short film
2021	With/In: Volume 2	(unknown)	Segment: 'Touching'. Also writer and director

=== Television ===
Year	Title	Role	Notes
1993	Press Gang	Ed	Series 5; episode 5: "Windfall"
1994	Frank Stubbs	Jerome	Series 2; episode 3: "Babies"
1995	Goodnight Sweetheart	Ludo	Series 2; episode 2: "I Got It Bad and That Ain't Good"
1995	Degrees of Error	Gareth	Episodes 1, 3 & 4
1996	The Girl	Ned Ridley	Television film
1996	Grange Hill	Ewan	Series 19; episodes 15 & 16
1996	Cold Lazarus	Nat	Mini-series; episodes 1 & 4
1996	Wings: The Legacy	Steve Hackett	British pilot episode
1996	The Tenant of Wildfell Hall	Ralph Hattersley	Mini-series; episodes 1–3
1996	The Thin Blue Line	Stallion	Series 2; episode 6: "Road Rage"
1996	Nightlife	Advocate	Television film
1997	Cows	Rex Johnson	Pilot episode
1997	Rebecca	Jack Favell	Mini-series; episodes 1 & 2
1997	Jonathan Creek	Hippy Protester	Series 1; episode 4: "No Trace of Tracy". Uncredited role
1997	A Dance to the Music of Time	Peter Templer	Mini-series; episodes 1–3
1998	Mosley	Oswald Mosley	Main role; episodes 1–4
1998	Diamond Girl	Reagan Montana	Television film
1998	The Jump	George Brunos	Episodes: 1–4
1999	Noah's Ark	Japheth	Mini-series; episodes 1 & 2
1999	The Bench	Wayne	Television film
2001	Dr. Terrible's House of Horrible	Randolph Crawford	Episode 5: "Voodoo Feet of Death"
2002	The Swap	Charles Anderson	2-part crime drama
2002	The American Embassy	Jack Wellington	Episodes 2–4 & 6
2003	Riverworld	Lucius Domitus Ahenobarbus / Nero	Television film (pilot episode)
2003	Out of the Ashes	Dr. Josef Mengele	Television film
2004	Agatha Christie's Poirot	John Christow	Series 9; episode 4: "The Hollow"
2004	Fallen	Jason Shepherd	2-part crime drama
2005	The Government Inspector	Alastair Campbell	Television film
2005	Empire	Tyrannus	Mini-series; episodes 1–6
2005	Inconceivable	Dr. Malcolm Bowers	Episode 5: "Sex, Lies and Sonograms"
2006	Extras	Steve Sherwood	Series 2; episode 5: "Sir Ian McKellen"
2006–2007	Six Degrees	Roy	Episodes 1–4 & 7
2007	The Mastersons of Manhattan	Marshall Crawford	Television film
2008	Law & Order: Criminal Intent	Colin Ledger	Season 7; episodes 20 & 21: "Neighborhood Watch" & "Last Rites"
2009	Chuck	Cole Barker	Season 2; episodes 15 & 16
2009	Law & Order	Defense Attorney Marcus Woll	Season 20; episodes 7 & 9: "Boy Gone Astray" & "For the Defense"
2009	Captain Cook's Extraordinary Atlas	Bishop	Television film
2010	Agatha Christie's Marple	Mark Easterbrook	Episode: "The Pale Horse"
2011	Off the Map	Angus Sinclair	Episode 5: "I'm Here"
2011	Rizzoli & Isles	Dr. Ian Faulkner	Season 2; episode 8: "My Own Worst Enemy"
2011–2012	Desperate Housewives	Chuck Vance	Seasons 7 & 8; 13 episodes
2012	The Killing	David Ranier	Season 2; episode 9: "Sayonara, Hiawatha"
2013	Lawless	Will Carlisle	Television film
2013	Death in Paradise	Daniel Morgan	Series 2; episode 4
2013–2015	Doll & Em	Buddy	Series 1 & 2; 8 episodes
2015	The Exes	Robert Thomas	Season 4; episode 8: "Requiem for a Dream"
2015	Stanistan	Greg	Television film
2016	Angie Tribeca	Nafan	Season 1; episode 9: "Inside Man"
2016	Criminal Minds	John Bradley	Season 11; episode 16
2016	Law & Order Special Victims Unit	Monsignor Mulregan	Season 17; episode 18
2016	Camping	Adam	Mini-series; episodes 1–6
2016–2019	The Affair	Furkat	Seasons 3 & 5; 5 episodes
2018	Legends of Tomorrow	Edward 'Blackbeard' Teach	Season 3; episodes 12 & 18
2018	SEAL Team	Xeon Tactical Security CEO Alan Cutter	Recurring role; season 1; episodes 16, 20 & 22
2020	Grey's Anatomy	Griffin Ford	Season 16; episode 17: "Life on Mars?"
2021–2022	Stargirl	The Shade (Richard Swift)	Recurring role; seasons 2 & 3; 15 episodes
2022	Five Days at Memorial	Vince Pou	Mini-series; episodes 2, 7 & 8
2024	Dinner with the Parents	Barnstable	Episode 7: "Music Under the Stars"
2024	Protection	John Gibson / Nigel Frankton	Mini-series; episodes 2 & 4–6
2025	And Just Like That...	Duncan Reeves	Season 3; recurring
2025	Emily in Paris	Thomas Heatherton	Season 5; season 5; episodes 5 & 10

=== Video games ===
Year	Title	Role	Notes
2011	Star Wars: The Old Republic	Darth Thanaton / Deadfall / General Greist (voice)	
2023	Forspoken	Cuff / Sussurus (voice)	
