= The Yanks at Oxford =

Non-fiction book by Allison Gill

The Yanks at Oxford: The 1987 Boat Race Controversy
- Author: Allison Gill
- Genre: non-fiction
- Publisher: Book Guild
- Publication date: 1991
- Publication place: United Kingdom
- Media type: Print (paperback)
- Pages: 185
- ISBN: 0-86332-662-5

The Yanks at Oxford: The 1987 Boat Race Controversy is a non-fiction book written by Allison Gill and published in 1991. The book is a commentary on True Blue: The Oxford Boat Race Mutiny by Dan Topolski and Patrick Robinson.

== Subject ==
Both books discuss the events surrounding the Oxford and Cambridge Boat Race of 1987 in which an American contingent led by Chris Clark of the Oxford team mutinied and was replaced by a less experienced team. In The Yanks at Oxford Gill, who was president of the Oxford University Women's Boat Club at the time of the incident, attempts to defend the actions of the American contingent. Gill is of the opinion that Topolski wrote True Blue to justify his own actions and also says that she believes that the Americans were not there to disrupt the boat race. Gill also raises criticism towards the portrayal of the American contingent in True Blue and its film adaptation.
