= H.M.S. Unseen (novel) =

1999 novel by Patrick Robinson

- First edition (UK)
- Author: Patrick Robinson
- Language: English
- Genre: War novel, Thriller
- Publisher: Century
- Publication date: 4 March 1999
- Publication place: United Kingdom
- Pages: 544
- ISBN: 9780061098017
- Followed by: U.S.S. Seawolf

H.M.S. Unseen is a naval thriller by Patrick Robinson published in 1999. It is the third book in the series featuring Admiral Arnold Morgan and marks the return of Ben Adnam. Stylistically, it is similar to the works of Tom Clancy, particularly his The Hunt for Red October. Unlike the previous two books in the series, this novel focuses less on the plot and heroes, and more on the character development of the villain, Ben Adnam.

== Plot summary ==
As hinted at in Nimitz Class, Ben Adnam is alive. After returning to Iraq, he is awarded a medal, but subsequently suffers a betrayal. He flees Iraq and offers his services to Iran, where he devises a plan to cripple transatlantic air travel. The plan requires capturing HMS Unseen, the last of the "quietest subs in the world," an Upholder class. He combines this with a defunct missile system to create a weapon capable of destroying aircraft without detection. The plan succeeds, and several aircraft, including "Air Force Three" carrying the Vice President, are destroyed. However, Ben is abandoned by the Iranians and left to fend for himself. He then schemes to meet Admiral Morgan, the man who has hunted him for so long, to offer his services to the US. During their confrontation, Adnam informs Morgan that Iraq was behind the terrorist attacks and suggests destroying some dams in the country as retribution. The US destroys the dams, resulting in Baghdad being submerged under four feet of water.

In the epilogue, Ben Adnam, now with a permanent job and a US passport, confesses to Morgan that he destroyed the airlines under the flag of Iran. An enraged Morgan terminates Adnam's employment, but allows him to take his own life rather than be killed by a SWAT team. With nowhere to run, Adnam positions himself in the traditional east-facing Muslim prayer position before shooting himself in the head.

=== Ben Adnam ===
Ben Adnam is an unusual techno-thriller villain because he is neither captured nor have any of his attacks thwarted by the "good guys"; even his death is self-inflicted. Some claim that the books are a satire of the genre, which often features flawless heroes and despicable, one-dimensional villains.

== See also ==
- State-sponsored terrorism
