= Seawolf =

Seawolf, Sea wolf or Sea Wolves may refer to:

== Animals ==
- Vancouver Coastal Sea wolf, a wolf subspecies found in the Vancouver coastal islands
- Seawolf (fish), a marine fish also known as wolffish or sea wolf
- A nickname of the Orca
- South American sea lion, locally called lobo marino (sea wolf)

== Arts and entertainment ==
- The Sea-Wolf, a 1904 novel by Jack London
  - The Sea Wolf (comic book), a 2012 comic book based on London's novel
- U.S.S. Seawolf (novel), a 2000 novel by Patrick Robinson
- Sea Wolf (comics), a supervillain in the DC Comics
- Sea Wolf (band), an American indie folk band

=== Films and television ===
- The Sea Wolf (1913 film), a lost silent film directed by Hobart Bosworth
- The Sea Wolf (1920 film), directed by George Melford
- The Sea Wolves (1925 film), a German silent film directed by Arthur Robison
- The Sea Wolf (1926 film), a silent film directed by Ralph Ince
- The Sea Wolf (1930 film), directed by Alfred Santell, starring Milton Sills, Raymond Hackett
- The Sea Wolf (1941 film), directed by Michael Curtiz, starring Edward G. Robinson, Ida Lupino
- The Sea Wolves, a 1980 British film directed by Andrew V. McLaglen, starring Gregory Peck, Roger Moore, David Niven
- Sea Wolves (film), a 1991 Hong Kong film, an instalment of the film series In the Line of Duty
- The Sea Wolf (1993 film), a TV film directed by Michael Anderson, starring Charles Bronson
- Sea Wolf (miniseries), a 2009 two-part German/Canadian TV miniseries, directed by Michael Barker, starring Sebastian Koch, Tim Roth, Neve Campbell

=== Video games ===
- Sea Wolf (video game), a 1976 arcade game by Midway
- SSN-21 Seawolf, a 1994 computer game for MS-DOS

== Military ==
- HMS Seawolf (1918), an S-class destroyer
- HMS Seawolf (47S), a submarine launched in 1935 and sold in 1945
- USS Seawolf, four US Navy submarines
- Seawolf-class submarine, a US Navy nuclear-powered fast attack submarine class built from 1989 to 2005
- Wolfpack Seewolf (German for Seawolf), a World War II German U-boat formation
- Consolidated TBY Sea Wolf, a United States Navy torpedo bomber of World War II
- Sea Wolf (missile), a British naval missile system
- HA(L)-3, a US Navy helicopter attack squadron nicknamed the Seawolves
- Seawolf AUV, a family of autonomous underwater vehicles from the Taiwanese company Thunder Tiger

== Mythology ==
- Gonakadet, commonly referred to as the Sea-Wolf, a mythical creature of the northwest coast of North America

== People with the nickname ==
- John D. Bulkeley (1911–1996), American vice admiral
- Thomas Cochrane, 10th Earl of Dundonald (1775–1860), British naval officer and politician
- Will Tye (born 1991), American football tight end

== Sports ==
=== United States ===
- Erie SeaWolves, a minor league baseball team
- North Sound SeaWolves, a soccer team in Snohomish County, Washington
- Seattle Seawolves, a Major League Rugby team
- Sonoma State University Seawolves
- Stony Brook Seawolves, Stony Brook University's athletics teams
- Tabor Academy (Massachusetts) Seawolves
- University of Alaska Anchorage Seawolves
- Orlando SeaWolves, an indoor soccer team
- Mississippi Sea Wolves (FPHL), a member of the Federal Prospects Hockey League

=== Elsewhere ===
- Rostock Seawolves, a German basketball team
- UNB Saint John Seawolves, a Canadian University campus athletics team

== Businesses ==
- Sea Wolf (bakery), a restaurant in Seattle, Washington, U.S.
