= Kilo Class (novel) =

1998 novel by Patrick Robinson

Kilo Class is a 1998 novel by Patrick Robinson. It features characters found in his earlier novel, Nimitz Class, including Admiral Arnold Morgan.

The novel concerns an attempt by the People's Republic of China to obtain a fleet of Kilo-class submarines from Russia, and a series of covert operations carried out by the United States Navy using a Los Angeles-class submarine and Navy SEALs in order to prevent the Chinese from receiving the new boats. The submarines are wanted by China because their ability to operate silently at low speed would make it possible to dominate the Taiwanese Strait even against US Naval opposition. The novel is set in the United States, Russia, China, Taiwan and the Southern Ocean Kerguelen Islands.

According to WorldCat, the book is held in 987 libraries
