= A Colossal Failure of Common Sense =

2009 book by Lawrence G. McDonald and Patrick Robinson

- Hardcover edition
- Author: Lawrence G. McDonald; Patrick Robinson
- Language: English
- Subject: Business history, finance
- Genre: Non-fiction
- Publisher: Crown Business
- Publication date: July 21, 2009
- Publication place: United States
- Media type: Print, e-book
- Pages: 368 pp.
- ISBN: 978-0307588333

A Colossal Failure of Common Sense: The Inside Story of the Collapse of Lehman Brothers is a 2009 non-fiction book written by Lawrence G. McDonald and Patrick Robinson which chronicles the events surrounding the bankruptcy of Lehman Brothers in the context of the 2008 financial crisis and the subprime mortgage crisis. The work is divided into a prologue, an epilogue, and twelve chapters.

As of August 9, 2009, the book was 7th on The New York Times Best Seller list for hardcover nonfiction.

A Colossal Failure of Common Sense is translated into 12 different languages.

== Summary ==
The book is highly critical of Richard Fuld, Henry Paulson, and the Gramm–Leach–Bliley Act, a 1999 act of Congress signed by former United States President Bill Clinton that repealed portions of the Glass–Steagall Act of 1933.

The book contains an account of how McDonald, after attending the University of Massachusetts Dartmouth, selling pork chops, and self-teaching himself the material required to pass the General Securities Representative Exam, went on to develop the website ConvertBond.com, which was later purchased by Morgan Stanley.

The author's stated expertise, in the convertible bond market, was what allowed him to create the website ConvertBond.com during the dot-com bubble, and successfully sell it to Morgan Stanley before the Internet bubble burst. It was while he was working at Morgan Stanley that McDonald was offered a job as vice-president at Lehman Brothers. The book characterizes Richard Fuld as being out of touch, smug, and a ruthless CEO with a short temper and a penchant for rage. The book sarcastically refers to Fuld as "his majesty," "god-like," and a "spiritual leader."

McDonald believes that the United States government should have saved Lehman Brothers, and that Dick Fuld falsely believed that the United States government would save the company after having a meeting with Henry Paulson in the spring of 2008, which led him to engage in unnecessarily risky behavior and reject an offer of $18 per share from the Korea Development Bank as late as August 2008.

== Chapters ==
1. A Rocky Road to Wall Street
2. Scaring Morgan Stanley to Death
3. Only the Bears Smiled
4. The Man in the Ivory Tower
5. A Miracle on the Waterway
6. The Day Delta Air Lines Went Bust
7. The Tragedy of General Motors
8. The Mortgage Bonanza Blows Out
9. King Richard Thunders Forward
10. A $100 Million Crash for Subprime's Biggest Beast
11. Wall Street Stunned as Kirk Quits
12. Fuld, Defiant to the End

== See also ==
- List of entities involved in 2007–2008 financial crises
- Subprime crisis impact timeline
