= USS Seawolf =

USS Seawolf may refer to:

- USS Seawolf (SS-28), renamed USS H-1 before launching, was the lead ship of the H-class of submarine. Commissioned in 1913, she ran aground and sank in 1920
- USS Seawolf (SS-197) was a Sargo-class submarine. Commissioned in 1939, she was successful during World War II until she was lost to friendly fire in 1944
- USS Seawolf (SSN-575) was the second nuclear submarine. She was commissioned in 1957 and stricken in 1987
- USS Seawolf (SSN-21) is the lead ship of her class. She was commissioned in 1997 and is currently in active service

== See also ==
- Seawolf-class submarine, including the SSN-21
- Seawolf (disambiguation)
