= The Boat Race =

Rowing races between Cambridge and Oxford

The Men's Boat Race

Event information
- Race area: The Championship Course; River Thames, London
- Dates: 1829, annual since 1856
- Sponsor: CHANEL J12
- Competitors: CUBC, OUBC
- Distance: 4.2 miles (6.8 km)
- First race: 10 June 1829
- Website: theboatrace.org

Results
- Winner (2026): Cambridge

The Women's Boat Race

Event information
- Race area: The Championship Course; River Thames, London (2015 onwards, except 2021 on the River Great Ouse); Henley (1977 to 2014 except 2001 at NWSC and 2013 on Dorney Lake); The Isis, Oxford and River Cam, Cambridge (1927 to 1976 with several gaps); River Thames, London (1929, 1935)
- Dates: 1927, annual since 1964
- Sponsor: CHANEL J12 (since 2025)
- Competitors: CUBC, OUWBC
- Distance: 4.2 miles (6.8 km)
- First race: 15 March 1927
- Website: theboatrace.org

The Boat Race is an annual set of rowing races between the Cambridge University Boat Club and the Oxford University Boat Club, traditionally rowed between open-weight eights on the River Thames in London, England. It is also known as the University Boat Race and the Oxford and Cambridge Boat Race.

The men's race was first held in 1829 and is the second oldest inter-university sporting event in the world. (Note: The University Match in cricket was first played in 1827.) It has been held annually since 1856, except during the First and Second World Wars (although unofficial races were conducted) and the COVID-19 pandemic in 2020. The first women's event was held in 1927, and the Women's Boat Race has been an annual event since 1964. Since 2015, the women's race has taken place on the same day and course as the men, and since 2018 the combined event of the two races has been referred to as "The Boat Race". A reserve (2nd VIII) boat race has also been held since 1965 for the men and since 1966 for the women, although a women's reserve race in IVs took place in 1965.

The Championship Course has hosted the vast majority of the men's races. Covering a 4.2-mile (6.8 km) stretch of the Thames in West London, from Putney to Mortlake, it is over three times the distance of an Olympic race. Members of both crews are traditionally known as blues and each boat as a "Blue Boat", with Cambridge in light blue and Oxford in dark blue. As of the 2025 race, Cambridge has won the men's race 88 times to Oxford's 81 times, with one dead heat, and has led Oxford in cumulative wins since 1930. In the women's race, Cambridge has won the race 48 times to Oxford's 30 times, and has led Oxford in cumulative wins since 1966.

Usually, over 250,000 people watch the race from the banks of the river. In 2009, a record 270,000 people watched the race live. The race is broadcast internationally on television; in 2014, 15 million people watched the race on television.

== History of the men's race ==
=== Origin ===
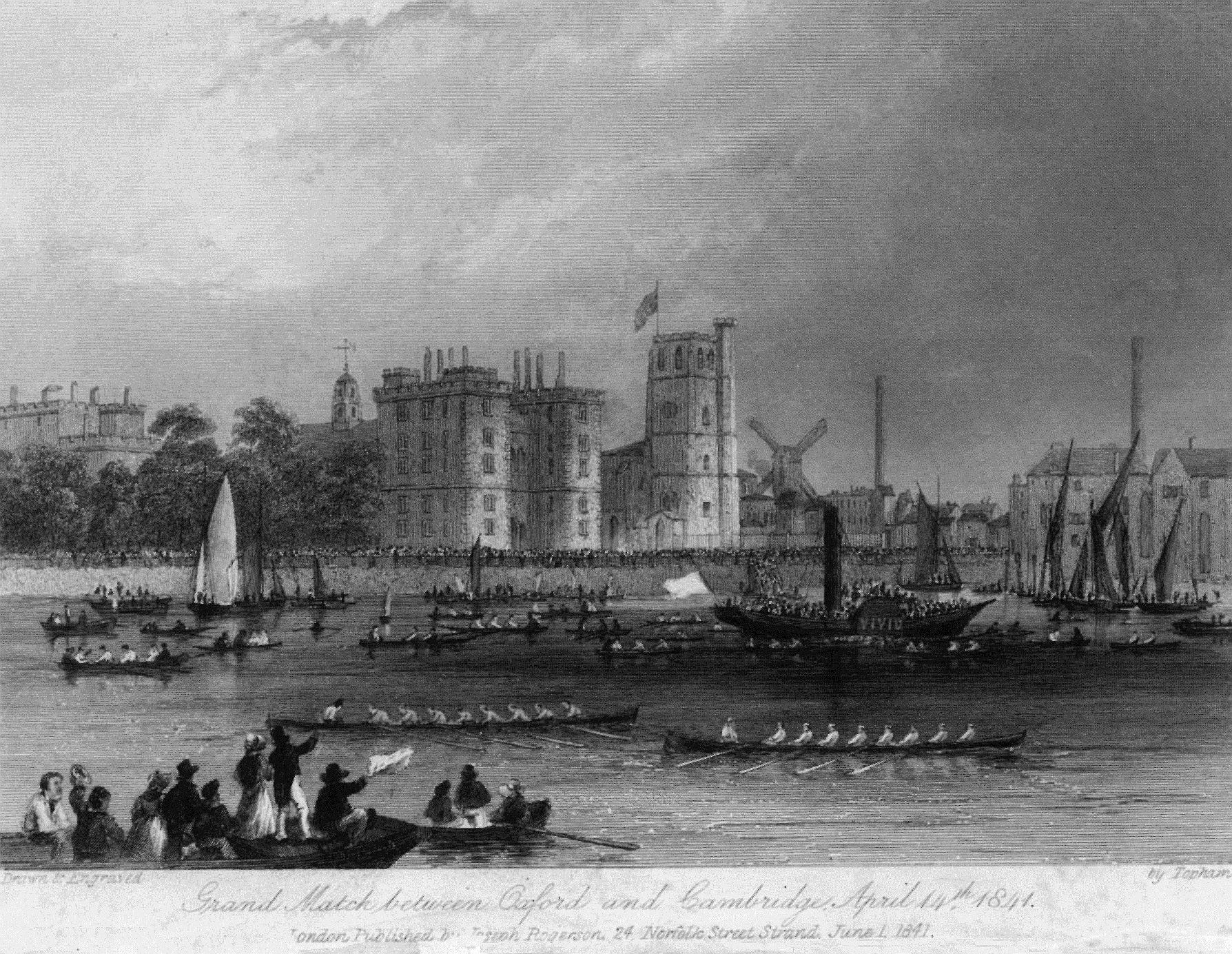
An engraving of the 1841 Boat Race, with the gatehouse of Lambeth Palace at centre-left

The tradition was started in 1829 by Charles Merivale, a student at St John's College, Cambridge, and his Old Harrovian school friend Charles Wordsworth who was studying at Christ Church, Oxford. The University of Cambridge challenged the University of Oxford to a race at Henley-on-Thames but Oxford won easily. Oxford raced in dark blue because five members of the crew, including the stroke, were from Christ Church, then Head of the River, whose colours were dark blue.

The second race was in 1836, with the venue moved to a course from Westminster to Putney. Over the next two years, there was disagreement over where the race should be held, with Oxford preferring Henley and Cambridge preferring London. Following the official formation of the Oxford University Boat Club, racing between the two universities resumed in 1839 on the Tideway and the tradition continues to the present day, with the loser challenging the winner to a rematch annually.

Since 1856, the race has been held every year, except for the years 1915 to 1919 due to World War I, 1940 to 1945, due to World War II, and in 2020 due to COVID-19 pandemic policy.

=== The Boats ===
The design of the boats used in the contest has over the years been refined through an on-going "arms race" between different boatbuilders. The first winning boat of 1829 resembled a pilot gig from Cornwall (45 ft or 14 metres in length, and weighing 972 lb or 441 kg), while those used a century later were 62 ft 6 in (19 metres) long and weighed approximately 350 lb or 160 kg. Factors that dictated where a boat was sourced from included success at a lower level, location of the boatbuilder, and the result of the previous contest. Others included different rowing styles in the early years, the influence of different schools of boatbuilding, family business connections and design innovations. The contest was dominated by Thames boatbuilders initially and during much of the 20th century, but those from the Newcastle 'stable' led in the late 19th century. After 1976 (the last race contested in a wooden boat) new composite materials were introduced that led to a new generation of boat manufacturers dominating the contest.

=== 1877 dead heat ===
The race in 1877 was declared a dead heat. Both crews finished in a time of 24 minutes and 8 seconds in bad weather. The verdict of the race judge, John Phelps, is considered suspect because he was reportedly over 70 and blind in one eye. Rowing historian Tim Koch, writing in the official 2014 Boat Race Programme, notes that there is "a very big and very entrenched lie" about the race, including the claim that Phelps had announced "Dead heat ... to Oxford by six feet" (the distance supposedly mentioned by Phelps varies according to the telling).

Phelps's nickname "Honest John" was not an ironic one, and he was not (as is sometimes claimed) drunk under a bush at the time of the finish. He did have to judge who had won without the assistance of finish posts (which were installed in time for the next year's race). Some newspapers had believed Oxford won a narrow victory but their viewpoint was from downstream; Phelps considered that the boats were essentially level with each surging forward during the stroke cycle. With no clear way to determine who had surged forward at the exact finish line, Phelps could only pronounce it a dead heat. Koch believes that the press and Oxford supporters made up the stories about Phelps later, which Phelps had no chance to refute.

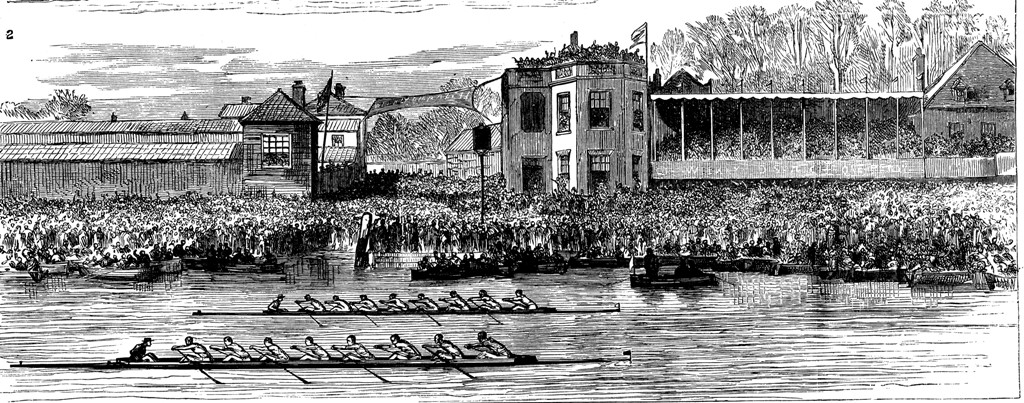
A portrayal of the dead-heat finish in 1877

Oxford, partially disabled, were making effort after effort to hold their rapidly waning lead, while Cambridge, who, curiously enough, had settled together again, and were rowing almost as one man, were putting on a magnificent spurt at 40 strokes to the minute, with a view of catching their opponents before reaching the winning-post. Thus struggling over the remaining portion of the course, the two eights raced past the flag alongside one another, and the gun fired amid a scene of excitement rarely equalled and never exceeded. Cheers for one crew were succeeded by counter-cheers for the other, and it was impossible to tell what the result was until the Press boat backed down to the Judge and inquired the issue. John Phelps, the waterman, who officiated, replied that the noses of the boats passed the post strictly level, and that the result was a dead heat.

— The Times

=== Temporary cancellations during World Wars ===
Because of World War I and II, the race was completely cancelled in 1915–1919 and 1940–1945. On 12 January 1915, The Daily Telegraph announced that the annual race was completely cancelled due to men leaving for war, "for every available oarsman, either Fresher or Blue, has joined the colours."

=== 1959 Oxford mutiny ===
In 1959 some of the existing Oxford blues attempted to oust president Ronnie Howard and coach Jumbo Edwards. Their attempt failed when Cambridge supported the president. Three of the dissidents returned and Oxford went on to win by six lengths.

=== 1987 Oxford mutiny ===
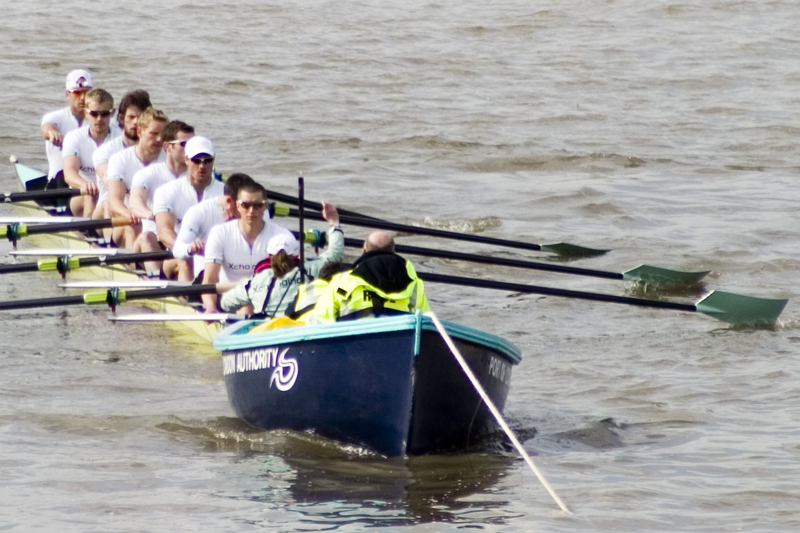
Cambridge at their stakeboat, just before the start of the 2009 race

Following defeat in the previous year's race, Oxford's first in eleven years, American Chris Clark was determined to gain revenge: "Next year we're gonna kick ass ... Cambridge's ass. Even if I have to go home and bring the whole US squad with me." He recruited another four American post-graduates: three international-class rowers (Dan Lyons, Chris Huntington and Chris Penny) and a cox (Jonathan Fish), in an attempt to put together the fastest Boat Race crew in the history of the contest.

When you recruit mercenaries, you can expect some pirates.

— British press

Disagreements over the training regime of Dan Topolski, the Oxford coach ("He wanted us to spend more time training on land than water!", lamented Lyons), led to the crew walking out on at least one occasion, and resulted in the coach revising his approach. A fitness test between Clark and club president Donald Macdonald (in which Clark triumphed) resulted in a call for Macdonald's removal; it was accompanied with a threat that the Americans would refuse to row should Macdonald remain in the crew. As boat club president, Macdonald "had absolute power over selection", and when he announced that Clark would row on bow side, his weaker side, Macdonald would row on the stroke side and Tony Ward was to be dropped from the crew entirely, the American contingent mutinied. After considerable negotiation and debate, much of it conducted in the public eye, Clark, Penny, Huntington, Lyons and Fish were dropped and replaced by members of Oxford's reserve crew, Isis.

The race was won by Oxford by four lengths, despite Cambridge being favourites.

In 1989 Topolski and author Patrick Robinson's book about the events, True Blue: The Oxford Boat Race Mutiny, was published. Seven years later, a film based on the book was released. Alison Gill, the then-president of the Oxford University Women's Boat Club, wrote The Yanks at Oxford, in which she defended the Americans and claimed Topolski wrote True Blue in order to justify his own actions. River and Rowing Museum founder Chris Dodd described True Blue as "particularly offensive" yet also wrote "[Oxford] lacked the power, the finesse—basically everything the pre-mutiny line-up had going for it."

=== 2012 disruption ===
In the 2012 race, after almost three-quarters of the course had been rowed, the race was halted for over 30 minutes when a lone protester, Australian Trenton Oldfield, entered the water from Chiswick Eyot and deliberately swam between the boats near Chiswick Pier with the intention of protesting against spending cuts, and what he saw as the erosion of civil liberties and a growing culture of elitism within British society. Once he was spotted by assistant umpire Sir Matthew Pinsent, both boats were required to stop for safety reasons. Once restarted, the boats clashed and the oar of Oxford crewman Hanno Wienhausen was broken in half with the blade snapped off. The race umpire John Garrett judged the clash to be Oxford's fault and allowed the race to continue. Cambridge quickly took the lead and went on to win the race. The Oxford crew entered a final appeal to the umpire which was quickly rejected; and Cambridge were confirmed as winners in the first race since 1849 that a crew had won the boat race without an official recorded winning time. After the end of the race Oxford's bow man, Alex Woods, received emergency treatment after collapsing in the boat from exhaustion. Because of the circumstances, the post-race celebrations by the winning Cambridge crew were unusually muted and the planned award ceremony was cancelled.

=== 2020 cancellation ===
Like other sports events, the 2020 boat race was completely cancelled because of COVID-19 pandemic policy.

=== 2021 Cambridgeshire relocation ===
The 2021 races were held on the Great Ouse at Ely in Cambridgeshire for the first time since the Second World War in 1944, over a shorter straight course of 4.9 kilometres (3.0 mi). This was due to the safety issues of Hammersmith Bridge, as well as restrictions due to the COVID-19 pandemic still being in force.

The 2022 Boat Race returned to the Thames and the traditional course between Putney and Mortlake.

=== Sinkings ===
In the 1912 race, rowed in extremely poor weather and high winds, both crews sank. Oxford rowed into a significant early lead, but began taking on water, and made for the bank shortly after passing Hammersmith Bridge to empty the boat out: although they attempted to restart, the race was abandoned at this point because Cambridge had also sunk while passing the Harrods Depository.

Cambridge also sank in 1859 and in 1978, while Oxford did so in 1925, and again in 1951; the 1951 race was re-rowed on the following Monday. In 1984 the Cambridge boat sank after colliding with a barge before the start of the race, which was then rescheduled for the next day. In 2016, at Barnes Bridge, Cambridge women began to sink but gradually recovered to complete the race.

== History of the women's race ==
From the first women's event in 1927, the Women's Boat Race was run separately from the men's event until 2015. There was significant inequality between the two events. Changes in the mid 2010s, arising significantly from the sponsorship of Newton Investment Management, have made the two races more equal: both events have been held together on The Tideway since 2015, and there are new training facilities for the women, comparable to those of the men, since 2016.

== Courses ==
The 1st Boat Race took place at Henley-on-Thames in 1829 but the event was subsequently officially held along the Thames, mostly the Championship Course, except the 2021 race which was moved to the River Great Ouse due to the COVID-19 pandemic and safety concerns under Hammersmith Bridge. Unofficial races were held during the Second World War at various locations.

Location of official runnings of the Boat Race
Year(s)	Location	Distance	Course
1829	Henley-on-Thames	2.25 miles (3.62 km)	River Thames between Hambleden Lock and Henley Bridge
1836–1842	Westminster to Putney	5.75 miles (9.25 km)	River Thames between Westminster Bridge and Putney Bridge
1845, 1849–1854, 1857–1862, 1864–present (except 1944 and 2021)	Championship Course	4 miles 374 yards (6.779 km)	River Thames, Putney to Mortlake
1846, 1856, 1863	Championship Course	4 miles 374 yards (6.779 km)	River Thames, Mortlake to Putney
1944, 2021	Ely/Littleport	5,350 yards (4.89 km)	River Great Ouse between Adelaide Bridge and Sandhill Bridge

=== The Championship Course ===
Boat Race course ("Middlesex" and "Surrey" denote sides of the Thames Tideway corresponding to the traditional English counties.)

The Championship Course is 4 miles and 374 yards (6.779 km) along an "iconic" stretch of the river from Putney to Mortlake, passing Hammersmith and Barnes, following an S shape, east to west. The start and finish are marked by the University Boat Race Stones on the south bank. The clubs' presidents toss a coin (an 1829 gold sovereign) before the race for the right to choose their station (i.e. which side of the river they will row on): their decision is based on the weather, the speed of the flood tide, and how the three bends in the course might favour their crew's pace. The north station ('Middlesex') has the advantage of the first and last bends, and the south ('Surrey') station the other, longer bend.

During the race the coxes compete to get their own boat into the fastest current, which lies at the deepest part of the river, frequently leading to clashes of blades and warnings from the umpire. A crew that gets a lead of more than a boat's length can cut in front of their opponent, making it extremely difficult for the trailing crew to gain the lead. For this reason the tactics of the race are generally to go fast early on, and it is unusual for the leading crew to change after halfway (though this happened in 2003, 2007 and 2010).

Save for three Victorian instances, each race is rowed westwards, but starts during the incoming (known as flood) tide, so that the crews are rowing with, not against, the fast stream. At the conclusion of the race, the boats come ashore at the shared shingle of the two boat clubs in Chiswick, a few metres west of Chiswick Bridge. Here, shortly after the race, the Boat Race trophy is presented to the winning crew. It is traditional for the winning side to throw their cox into the Thames to celebrate their achievement.

=== Unofficial courses ===
In addition, there were four unofficial boat races held during the Second World War away from London. None of those competing were awarded blues, and these races are not included in the official list:

- 1940, 1945 – Henley-on-Thames
- 1943 – Sandford-on-Thames
- 1944, 2021 – River Great Ouse, Ely: Littleport to Queen Adelaide

=== Women's Boat Race courses ===
During its early years, from 1927 to 1976 with several gaps, the Women's Boat Race alternated between The Isis in Oxford and the River Cam in Cambridge over a distance of about 1,000 yards. On two occasions, in 1929 and 1935, the race was held on the Tideway in London. Unlike the men's race, the official women's race continued in most years through the Second World War.

From 1977 to 2014, the Women's Boat Race was held on a 2000-metre course as part of the Henley Boat Races. The crews raced Henley Royal Regatta course downstream—the opposite direction to that of the Regatta (which was a completely separate event)—finishing halfway down Temple Island. However, the entire Henley Boat Races were moved in 2001 to the Holme Pierrepont National Watersports Centre in Nottingham, and in 2013 to Dorney Lake due to rough water at Henley.

Since 2015, the women's boat race has taken place on the Championship course; except in 2021 during the COVID-19 pandemic, when the race was held on the River Great Ouse from Ely, Cambridgeshire, along with the men's race.

== Media coverage ==
The race first appeared in a short film of the 1895 race entitled The Oxford and Cambridge University Boat Race, directed and produced by Birt Acres. Consisting of a single shot of around a minute, it was the first film to be commercially screened in the UK outside London. The men's race was first broadcast on BBC Radio in 1927, with BBC Television first covering the men's race in 1938.

The event is now a British national institution, and is televised live each year. The women's race has received television coverage and grown in popularity since 2015, attracting a television audience of 4.8 million viewers that year.

For the 2005 to 2009 races, the BBC lost the television rights to ITV, but it returned to the corporation in 2010. LBC held the radio rights from 2005 until 2010. Ethnographer Mark de Rond described the training, selection, and victory of the 2007 Cambridge crew in The Last Amateurs: To Hell and Back with the Cambridge Boat Race Crew.

The rights holders changed for the 2026 event when television coverage moved to Channel 4 for the next five years. Times Radio picked up the radio rights to the race until 2028.

== Competitors ==
=== Men's race ===
Many notable individuals have participated in the Boat Race, including those of an Olympic standard. Four-time Olympic gold medallist Sir Matthew Pinsent, rowed for Oxford in 1990, 1991, and 1993. Olympic gold medallists from 2000 – James Cracknell (Cambridge 2019), Tim Foster (Oxford 1997), Luka Grubor (Oxford 1997), Andrew Lindsay (Oxford 1997, 1998, 1999) and Kieran West (Cambridge 1999, 2001, 2006, 2007), 2004 – Ed Coode (Oxford 1998), and 2008 – Jake Wetzel (Oxford 2006) and Malcolm Howard (Oxford 2013, 2014) have also rowed for their university.

Other famous participants include Andrew Irvine (Oxford 1922, 1923), Lord Snowdon (Cambridge 1950), Colin Moynihan (Oxford 1977), actor Hugh Laurie (Cambridge 1980), TV presenter Dan Snow (Oxford 1999, 2000, 2001) and Conspicuous Gallantry Cross recipient Robin Bourne-Taylor (Oxford 2001, 2002, 2003, 2005).

=== Academic status ===
Oxford University does not offer sport scholarships at entry; student-athletes are not admitted differently to any other students and must meet the academic requirements of the university, with sport not affecting any application. There are sports bursaries and scholarship opportunities at the University of Cambridge, open only to students who have already been admitted to the university on academic merit.

In order to protect the status of the race as a competition between genuine students, the Cambridge University Blues Committee in July 2007 refused to award recognition as a blue to 2006 and 2007 Cambridge oarsman Thorsten Engelmann after he had been a member of the winning team, as he later did not complete his academic course and instead returned to the German national rowing team to prepare for the Beijing Olympics. This caused a debate about a change of rules; one suggestion was that only students who are enrolled in courses lasting at least two years should be eligible to race.

=== Standard of the men's crews ===
According to British Olympic gold medallist Martin Cross, Boat Race crews of the early 1980s were viewed as "a bit of a joke" by some international-level rowers of the time. However, their standard has improved substantially since then. In 2007 Cambridge were entered in the London Head of the River Race, where they should have been measured directly against the best crews in Britain and beyond. However, the event was called off after several crews were sunk or swamped in rough conditions. Cambridge were fastest of the few crews who did complete the course. The Cambridge 2026 crew was described as their best ever and arguably the fastest eight in the world at that time with world champion athletes in the reserve boat.

== Sponsorship ==
The men's race has been sponsored since 1976, with the money spent mainly on equipment and travel during the training period. The sponsors do not have their logos on the boats, but now tend to have their logo on kit during the race. They also provide branded training gear and have some naming rights. Boat Race sponsors have included Ladbrokes, Beefeater Gin, Aberdeen Asset Management, and the business process outsourcing company Xchanging for a few years until 2012. Since 2010 the deal has included the crews agreeing to wear the logo on their race kit for more funding. Prior to this, all sponsorship marks had been scrupulously discarded on boating for the competition, on amateurist, 'Corinthian' values but perhaps also as before televised races a single sponsor for both crews was unlikely. The sponsor has extended to being a "title sponsor" (titular, official race name) since such a longer name of the race was founded in 2010, the first three of which thus becoming The Xchanging Boat Race.

The women's crews had no sponsorship and were self funded until the Women's Boat Race 2011 when Newton Investment Management, a subsidiary of BNY Mellon, stepped in as a sponsor of both women's crews. Over subsequent years, Newton increased the amount of funding for the women's race significantly.

BNY Mellon took over sponsorship of the men's race in 2013 and it became the BNY Mellon Boat Race. From 2016 to 2018, BNY Mellon and Newton Investment management donated the title sponsorship to Cancer Research UK, and, from 2019 until 2021, the Royal National Lifeboat Institution (RNLI).

The men's and women's races came under the same sponsorship for the first time in 2021; Gemini, a cryptocurrency exchange founded by 2010 Oxford Blues Cameron and Tyler Winklevoss, took over as title sponsor and it became the Gemini Boat Race.

French luxury brand Chanel and The Boat Race Company Ltd announced the signing of a long-term partnership in 2024 with Chanel as Title Sponsor and official Timekeeping Partner. The 2025 event will become The Chanel J12 Boat Race.

== Other boat races involving Oxford and Cambridge ==
Although the Boat Race crews are the best-known, the universities both field reserve crews. The reserves race takes place on the same day as the main race. The Oxford men's reserve crew is called Isis (after the Isis, a section of the River Thames which passes through Oxford), and the Cambridge reserve men's crew is called Goldie (the name comes from rower and Boat Club president John Goldie, 1849–1896, after whom the Goldie Boathouse is named). The women's reserve crews are Osiris (Oxford) and Blondie (Cambridge). A veterans' boat race, usually held on a weekday before the main Boat Race, takes place on the Thames between Putney and Hammersmith.

The two universities also field lightweight men's and women's crews. These squads race each other in eights as part of the Lightweight Boat Races. The first men's race took place in 1975, being joined by a women's race in 1984. Both races are currently held on the 4.2-mile (6.8 km) Championship Course from Putney to Mortlake, although they previously formed part of the Henley Boat Races, along with various other rowing races between the two universities including the openweight women's Boat Race until 2015. Competitors in the event have gone on to compete at international and Olympic levels, as well as represent their universities at openweight level. For the men's race the average weight of the crew must be 70 kilograms (154.3 lb; 11 st 0.3 lb), with no rower weighing over 72.5 kilograms (159.8 lb; 11 st 5.8 lb). For the women's race no rower can exceed 59 kilograms (130.1 lb; 9 st 4.1 lb). At Oxford, both the men's and women's lightweight boats are awarded a full blue. At Cambridge the women's boat is awarded a full blue, whereas the men's boat receives a half-blue.

== In popular culture ==
Boat race became such a popular phrase that it was incorporated into Cockney rhyming slang, for "face".

In the stories of P. G. Wodehouse, several characters allude to Boat Race night as a time of riotous celebration (presumably after the victory of the character's alma mater). This frequently sees the participants in trouble with the authorities. In Piccadilly Jim, it is mentioned that Lord Datchett was thrown out of the Empire Music Hall every year on Boat Race night while he was an undergraduate. Bertie Wooster mentions he is "rather apt to let myself go a bit" on Boat Race night and several times describes one year being fined five pounds at "Bosher Street" (possibly a reference to Bow Street Magistrates' Court) for stealing a policeman's helmet; the beginning of the first episode of the television series Jeeves and Wooster shows his court appearance on this occasion. In the short story Jeeves and the Chump Cyril, he describes having to repeatedly bail out of jail a friend who is arrested every year on Boat Race night.

Wodehouse's portrayal of rowdy, drunken revelry in the West End of London on Boat Race night has some basis in fact: there were many such incidents reported in the early part of the 20th century. In 1924, Patrick Mallam, who had rowed bow in the Oxford boat and was the President of the Oxford boat club, was charged at Bow Street Magistrates' Court with being drunk and disorderly on the night following the race. In 1932, 39 people appeared at Marlborough Street Magistrates Court charged with drunkenness and other offenses after Boat Race night, although some were arrested rugby fans as the 1932 Calcutta Cup match had been played two days after the Boat Race. In 1935, the same court saw 50 people charged with similar offenses.

In Missee Lee by Arthur Ransome (one of the Swallows and Amazons series of children's books) Captain Flint (who had dropped out of Oxford) tells Missee Lee he was in gaol once on Boat-race night. High spirits. A fancy for policemen's helmets. When Missee Lee says Camblidge won and evellybody happy he replies Not that year, ma'am. We were the happy ones that year. In the Jennings books by Anthony Buckeridge the protagonist's teacher Mr Wilkins is a former Cambridge rowing blue.

The 1969 film The Magic Christian features the Boat Race, as Sir Guy makes use of the Oxford crew in one of his elaborate pranks.

Actor and comedian Matt Berry wrote and narrated an irreverent, alternative history of the Boat Race for the BBC in 2015.

== Statistics ==
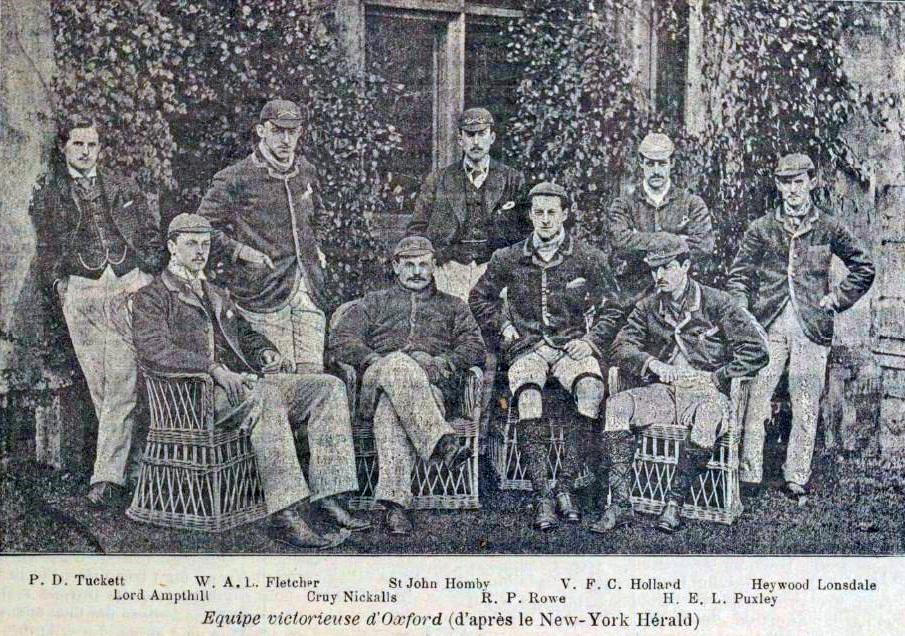
Oxford in 1890 (winner)

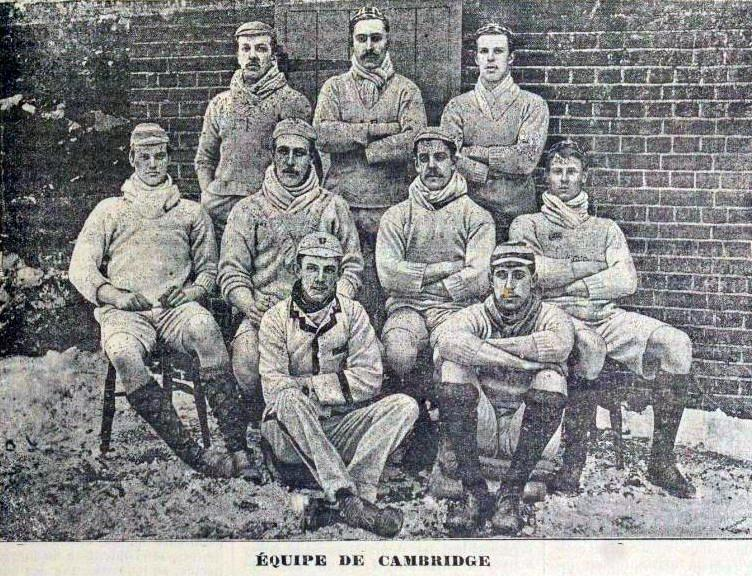
Cambridge in 1890

Men's race

- Number of wins: Cambridge, 88; Oxford, 81 (1 dead heat)
- Most consecutive victories: Cambridge, 13 (1924–36)
- Course record: Cambridge, 1998 – 16 min 19 sec; average speed 24.9 kilometres per hour (15.5 mph)
- Narrowest winning margin, excluding the dead heat: 1 foot (Oxford, 2003)
- Largest winning margin: 35 lengths (Cambridge, 1839)
- Reserve wins: Cambridge (Goldie), 29; Oxford (Isis), 24

Women's race

- Number of wins: Cambridge, 46; Oxford, 30
- Course record: Cambridge, 2022 – 18 min 22 sec (faster, in different conditions, than the Cambridge men's Blue Boat in 2016 and the Oxford men's in 2014)
- Reserve wins: Cambridge (Blondie), 27; Oxford (Osiris), 20

== Results ==
Cumulative wins by Oxford and Cambridge men's and women's blue and reserve boats (In the SVG file, hover over a graph to highlight it.)

Men's race

There have been 169 official races in 195 years.

Decade	Total races	Cambridge wins	Oxford wins	Notes
1820s	1	0	1	
1830s	2	2	0	
1840s	7	5	2	
1850s	6	2	4	
1860s	10	1	9	
1870s	10	7	2	1 dead heat
1880s	10	5	5	
1890s	10	1	9	
1900s	10	7	3	
1910s	5	1	4	
1920s	10	9	1	
1930s	10	8	2	
1940s	4	3	1	
1950s	10	7	3	
1960s	10	5	5	
1970s	10	5	5	
1980s	10	1	9	
1990s	10	7	3	
2000s	10	3	7	
2010s	10	5	5	
2020s	6	5	1	
Total	170	88	81	1 dead heat

Women's race

There have been 75 races in 94 years.

== See also ==
- Oxford–Cambridge rivalry
- The Boat Race of the North – a similar event in Northern England between Durham University and Newcastle University
- Harvard–Yale Regatta – a similar event in the United States between Harvard University and Yale University
- List of British and Irish varsity matches
- Scottish Boat Race – a similar event in Scotland between University of Glasgow and University of Edinburgh
- The Welsh Boat Race – a similar event in Wales between Swansea University and Cardiff University
- York and Lancaster Universities Roses Race – a boat race between University of York and Lancaster University
- Great River Race – an annual 22 mile race on the River Thames between Millwall and Richmond
- University and college sport
