= Long Time Dead =

- Theatrical poster
- Directed by: Marcus Adams
- Screenplay by: Eitan Arrusi; Chris Baker; Daniel Bronzite; Andy Day
- Story by: Marcus Adams; Daniel Bronzite; James Gay-Rees
- Produced by: James Gay-Rees
- Starring: Alec Newman; Marsha Thomason; Joe Absolom; Lukas Haas; James Hillier; Mel Raido; Lara Belmont; Melanie Gutteridge
- Cinematography: Nic Morris
- Edited by: Lucia Zucchetti
- Music by: Don Davis
- Production companies: Universal Pictures; StudioCanal; Working Title Films; UK Film Council; Midfield Films
- Distributed by: United International Pictures (International); Mars Distribution (France)
- Release date: 18 January 2002 (United Kingdom)
- Running time: 94 minutes
- Countries: France; United Kingdom
- Languages: English; French
- Box office: $13.1 million

Long Time Dead is a 2002 horror film, co-written and directed by Marcus Adams in his directorial debut.

Set in the United Kingdom, the film follows a group of college students in which they experiment with a Ouija board and inadvertently summon a djinn, an Arabic spirit of fire, which puts their lives in danger.

The film stars Alec Newman, Marsha Thomason and Joe Absolom alongside Mel Raido, Lara Belmont, Melanie Gutteridge and Lukas Haas.

== Plot ==
In 1979, a group of demon worshippers in Morocco try to invoke a spirit using a Ouija board. It had resulted in 8 deaths and 2 survivals.

In present-day London, 3 teenagers; Liam (Alec Newman), Rob (Joe Absolom) and Webster (Lukas Haas) prepare to go to a big party held at an abandoned warehouse. Another teenage girl, Stella (Lara Belmont) is also invited to the party and encounters Joe (Mel Raido), who would be the new roommate in the apartment the teenagers live in. She introduces Becker (Tom Bell), the landlord of the apartment to Joe. At the party, the teenagers hang out with Annie (Melanie Gutteridge), who is Liam's girlfriend as well as Lucy (Marsha Thomason) and Spencer (James Hillier), who are two teenagers who reside in a boat. After the teenagers get high from drinking and smoking, Spencer suggests to everyone they should try to play a Ouija Board and they all agree with him.

The gang heads into an empty room within the factory and constructs a homemade Ouija Board using a glass and some paper. Lucy warns everyone that they should not take their finger off the glass or else the spirit they would be in contact with would be unable to return to its world. When the Ouija Board spells "Djinn", Liam has a traumatic flashback of the Djinn killing everyone, freaks out, breaks the glass and runs away. Everyone realizes how horribly wrong it has gone and decide to leave. Later that night, the Djinn hunts down Annie by throwing her through the skylight and causing her to fall hard onto a table, killing her.

The teenagers later return to the apartment while Spencer and Lucy return to their boat, but a frightful encounter forces them to seek refuge at the apartment. While the teenagers try to investigate the cause of Annie's death, a power outage occurs. When Spencer and Webster sneak into Becker's room to turn the power back on, they discover a bunch of photos, relics and newspaper articles that he had kept and urge the others to come and see. They discover that Becker and Liam's father, Paul Brennan (Michael Feast) once conducted a seance to come into contact with the Djinn and Paul was sent to a hospital. They decide to call the police.

The next day, the teenagers meet Liam at school to tell him what they had discovered, but Liam denies any knowledge of it. He later decides to visit Paul at the hospital to get some answers to his questions. Meanwhile, Becker visits Lucy to warn her that the Djinn has possessed one of the teenagers and she has to conduct a banishing to get rid of the evil spirits. At the same time, Stella, Joe and Webster progressively get killed by the Djinn. That night, Lucy meets Spencer and Rob to tell them her idea to banish the Djinn.

Lucy, Rob and Spencer head into the same abandoned factory where Annie was killed the night. Meanwhile, Liam notices that the 3 of them are missing and heads to the factory to look for them. The three teenagers try to conduct the banishing but it fails when the Ouija Board catches fire and explodes. Spencer tries to hide, but is killed by Rob (who was actually possessed by the Djinn the entire time). Becker arrives to knock Rob unconscious and covers him in gasoline, but Liam attacks Becker while Rob finishes the job.

Rob insists to Liam they should leave, but Liam finds Lucy hanged to her death inside an elevator shaft. When he asks Rob for help, the Djinn reveals itself and attacks Liam. In a scuffle, Liam picks up an oil lamp and uses it to ignite Rob on fire, and he kicks him down the elevator shaft. However, the shaft explodes and Liam is killed. With Liam dead, the Djinn possesses his body to visit Paul in the hospital, where he burns him.

== Cast ==
- Alec Newman as Liam
- Marsha Thomason as Lucy
- Joe Absolom as Rob
- Lukas Haas as Webster
- James Hillier as Spencer
- Mel Raido as Joe
- Lara Belmont as Stella
- Melanie Gutteridge as Annie
- Tom Bell as Becker
- Michael Feast as Paul Brennan

== Reception ==
Long Time Dead received mixed-to-negative reviews from critics and audiences. It currently has an approval rating of 22% on Rotten Tomatoes based on reviews from 9 critics.
