= The War Zone =

1999 British drama film by Tim Roth

- Theatrical release poster
- Directed by: Tim Roth
- Written by: Alexander Stuart
- Based on: The War Zone by Alexander Stuart
- Produced by: Sarah Radclyffe; Dixie Linder
- Starring: Ray Winstone; Tilda Swinton; Lara Belmont; Freddie Cunliffe
- Cinematography: Seamus McGarvey
- Edited by: Trevor Waite
- Music by: Simon Boswell
- Production company: Lot 47 Films
- Distributed by: FilmFour Distributors
- Release date: 10 December 1999
- Running time: 95 minutes
- Country: United Kingdom
- Language: English
- Box office: $254,441 (US)

The War Zone is a 1999 British drama film written by Alexander Stuart, directed by Tim Roth in his directorial debut, and starring Ray Winstone, Tilda Swinton, Lara Belmont, Freddie Cunliffe, and Colin Farrell in his film debut (in a credited role). The film is based on Stuart's 1989 novel of the same name and takes a blunt look at incest and sexual violence in an English family.

== Plot ==
Fifteen-year-old Tom is upset after his family moves from London to a rural house in Devon. He misses his friends, and family dynamics are strange. His Mum is in the late stages of pregnancy, his Dad is in the home-furniture industry. Tom and his 18-year-old sister Jessie are unusually close to each other, and everyone helps Mum during her pregnancy.

One night, Mum goes into labour and Dad drives the whole family to the hospital. The car crashes, but nobody is badly injured and a baby girl is born while Mum is trapped in the car. They all go to the hospital to get stitched up and they see Mum and the baby happy. Later, while coming home from shopping with Mum, Tom complains he doesn't know anybody, but she assures him he will make friends. When they arrive home, Tom enters the house through the back door and something catches his attention.

Tom confronts Jessie and asks about what he saw: Dad and Jessie, naked in a bathtub together. Jessie acts as if nothing happened, but he is adamant about what he witnessed. The family goes out to the pub, and Jessie introduces Tom to her boyfriend Nick, who drives Jessie and Tom down to the beach. They engage in awkward conversation before Jessie and Nick disappear, leaving Tom alone by the fire. The parents are furious with them for staying out all night without telling them, and Mum must restrain Dad from harming Jessie. Later, Tom tells Jessie that he suspects that her and Dad's behavior has been ongoing. Jessie neither confirms nor denies this, causing Tom to lash out in anger.

Later, Dad tells them he is going for a run. Full of suspicion and armed with a video camera, Tom follows Dad and Jessie into an old war bunker near the beach. Filming through a hole in the wall, he witnesses Dad sodomizing Jessie against her will. Tom walks off and, devastated, throws the camera into the sea.

Tom accuses Jessie of being sick because of her actions with their father. Jessie lets him burn her breast with a lighter to make him feel better, but this satisfies neither and he tells her it must stop. Later she takes Tom on a trip to London to see a friend, Carol, who attempts to seduce him at Jessie's behest, but stops when she walks in on them.

One night, Tom is woken up by Mum, who tells him they must urgently go to the hospital because the baby is unwell. Jessie drives Tom home from the hospital, leaving Dad with Mum and the baby. When they get home they see Lucy, who offers Jessie comfort if she needs it. Lucy appears to know something that the viewer doesn't. Later, Tom decides to cycle back to the hospital, where he sees baby Alice, and when Mum comes in they see blood in her nappy. He tells Mum never to let Dad near the baby and not to trust him, but leaves before she can respond.

When Tom returns home, Dad tells him that Mum called from the hospital and confronts him, saying he's lying, and Tom says he is telling the truth, whereupon Dad attacks him physically, saying that Tom is breaking up the family and that he will put Tom into care. Jessie is crying throughout, arms over her head covering her ears. Dad then leaves to see Mum.

Tom and Jessie lie next to each other in bed and Jessie thanks him for standing up to Dad. Tom and Jessie enter Dad's room after he returns. He continues to deny his behaviour and claims that Tom is making things up because he misses London, is unhappy, and is putting ideas into Jessie's head. Jessie backs Tom up, but is upset by Dad's continued gaslighting.

As Dad blusters, Tom realises that he will not change. He stabs Dad in the stomach with a kitchen knife. Dad screams in pain on the floor. Tom and Jessie watch him gasping and bleeding on the floor and then Tom runs from the house to go to the bunker. Jessie follows him there and comforts him silently. Tom asks what they will do now. He walks over and closes the door to the bunker.

== Cast ==
- Ray Winstone as Dad
- Tilda Swinton as Mum
- Lara Belmont as Jessie
- Freddie Cunliffe as Tom
- Colin Farrell as Nick
- Aisling O'Sullivan as Carol
- Kate Ashfield as Lucy
- Kim Wall as Barman
- Annabelle Apsion as Nurse

== Production ==
Producers wanted to cast Jaime Winstone in the role of Jessie, Ray Winstone's screen daughter. Ray Winstone refused point blank to have his own daughter in the role.

Ray Winstone said the bunker scene was very difficult for him, also because Lara Belmont was the same age as Ray's real life oldest daughter.

== Reception ==
=== Box office ===
The War Zone was given a limited theatrical release in 12 cinemas in the United States and earned $254,441.

=== Critical response ===
The War Zone received mainly positive reviews. It has a score of 84% on Rotten Tomatoes based on 31 reviews with an average rating of 7.4 out of 10. The site's critics' consensus states: "With the well-acted The War Zone, debuting director Tim Roth finds moments of beauty in a tale of stark horror -- and marks himself as a talent to watch behind the camera." The film also has a score of 68 out of 100 based on 21 critics on Metacritic indicating "Generally favorable reviews".

Roger Ebert of the Chicago Sun-Times gave the film four out of four stars and wrote "Unsurprisingly, The War Zone affects viewers much more powerfully than a simple morality tale might. It is not simply about the evil of incest, but about its dynamic, about the way it does play upon guilt and shame, and address old and secret wounds. ... Roth is one of the best actors now working, and with this movie he reveals himself as a director of surprising gifts. I cannot imagine The War Zone being better directed by anyone else, even though Ingmar Bergman and Ken Loach come to mind. Roth and his actors, and Stuart's screenplay, understand these people and their situation down to the final nuance, and are willing to let silence, timing and visuals reveal what dialogue would cheapen. Not many movies bring you to a dead halt of sorrow and empathy. This one does."

Emanuel Levy wrote in Variety that "Unlike most actors-turned-directors, Roth doesn't commit the mistake of letting his cast indulge in big, theatrical scenes with long monologues and mega-close-ups. Under his guidance, Seamus McGarvey's luminous camera observes the family from the right distance – neither too close nor too detached – allowing viewers to watch and make up their own minds about the tangled web of relationships. As discerning as Roth's helming is, pic's overall impact largely depends on its superb ensemble and perfect casting. Special kudos go to newcomers Cunliffe and Belmont, who, despite a lack of acting experience, render multi-shaded performances that always ring true. Winstone is terrifyingly explosive as Dad. In a quiet role that's a departure from her previous work, Swinton shines as Mum, a woman so preoccupied with her baby that she's unaware of the crises tearing apart her family. Boasting first-rate production values and resplendent from first frame to last, The War Zone is a gem of a movie."

James Berardinelli wrote "The War Zone is a devastating motion picture; it's the kind of movie that stuns an audience so absolutely that they remain paralyzed in their seats through the end credits. In his handling of the material, Roth shows more ability than many accomplished, veteran filmmakers. He paints Devon as a grim, rainy place where darkness and grayness are always encroaching upon the light. Roth deals with the story in a way that does not insult the viewer's intelligence. There is much ambiguity to be found here."

== Accolades ==
Year	Award	Category	Nominee(s)	Result	Ref.
2001	Chicago Film Critics Association Awards	Most Promising Actress	Lara Belmont	Nominated	
2001	Independent Spirit Awards	Best Foreign Film	Tim Roth	Nominated	
2000	Bodil Awards	Best Non-American Film	Tim Roth	Nominated	
1999	Berlin International Film Festival	C.I.C.A.E. Award	Tim Roth	Won	
1999	British Independent Film Awards	Most Promising Newcomer	Lara Belmont	Won	
1999	British Independent Film Awards	Best British Independent Film		Nominated	
1999	British Independent Film Awards	Best Performance by an Actor in a British Independent Film	Ray Winstone	Nominated	
1999	British Independent Film Awards	Best Performance by an Actress in a British Independent Film	Lara Belmont	Nominated	
1999	European Film Awards	Best Film	Dixie Linder, Sarah Radclyffe	Nominated	
1999	European Film Awards	European Actor	Ray Winstone	Nominated	
1999	European Film Awards	European Discovery of the Year	Tim Roth	Won	
1999	Edinburgh International Film Festival	Best New British Feature	Tim Roth	Won	
1999	Tróia International Film Festival	First Works Section	Tim Roth	Won	
1999	Ft. Lauderdale International Film Festival	Best Director	Tim Roth	Won	
1999	Ft. Lauderdale International Film Festival	Best First Feature	Tim Roth	Won	
1999	Ft. Lauderdale International Film Festival	Spirit of Independents	Lara Belmont	Won	
1999	Valladolid International Film Festival	Silver Spike	Tim Roth	Won	
1999	Valladolid International Film Festival	Golden Spike	Tim Roth	Nominated	
