= Lawrence G. McDonald =

American businessman and financial journalist

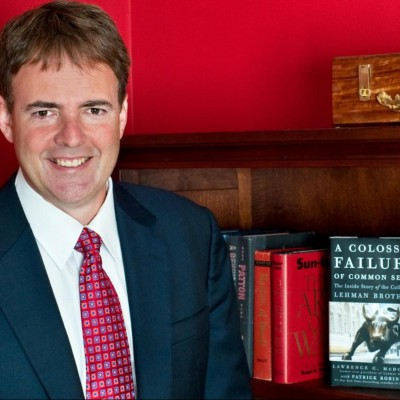
- Larry McDonald
- Born: Lowell, Massachusetts

Lawrence 'Larry' G. McDonald is an author and CNBC contributor, currently founder of 'The Bear Traps Report', an investment newsletter focused on Political and Systemic Risk with actionable trade ideas and Macro perspective. Former Head of U.S. Macro Strategy at Societe Generale and former vice-president of distress debt and convertible securities trading at Lehman Brothers.

== Early life and education ==
Lawrence McDonald was born in Lowell, Massachusetts and grew up in the Cape Cod region. He graduated from Falmouth High School. McDonald attended The University of Massachusetts Dartmouth and received a degree in economics in 1989.

Lawrence McDonald was COO/Co-founder of Convertbond.com. Property rights to Convertbond.com were sold to Morgan Stanley.

Lawrence McDonald joined Lehman Brothers in New York City, in 2004 as vice-president of Distressed Debt and Convertible Securities Trading.

== Career ==
Lawrence G. McDonald is currently a keynote speaker, founder of The Bear Traps Report Investment Newsletter and partner at ACG Analytics. He is also a financial consultant, global lecture speaker, and co-author of the book A Colossal Failure of Common Sense.

McDonald is the creator of The Bear Traps Report, an investment newsletter providing weekly market insights, specific investments, and global trends.

McDonald is a frequent writer for Forbes Magazine and a guest contributor on Bloomberg, CNBC, and Fox Business News. He is the author of the new bestselling book, "How to Listen When Markets Speak."

=== 2008 financial crisis ===
McDonald was a special advisor to the Financial Crisis Inquiry Commission (FCIC), created by Congress in 2009 to investigate the causes, domestic and global, of the 2008 financial crisis.

Lawrence McDonald was a cast participant in major financial crisis documentary Inside Job, an Academy Award Winner for Best Documentary in 2010, directed by Charles H. Ferguson. McDonald was also a cast participant in documentaries: BBC's The Love of Money and CBC's House of Cards.

In an editorial for the Huffington Post, McDonald was critical of former United States Secretary of the Treasury Henry Paulson's decision to save Bear Stearns while allowing Lehman Brothers to fail.

=== A Colossal Failure of Common Sense ===
In the book A Colossal Failure of Common Sense, McDonald gave his account of the events surrounding the 2008 financial crisis. The book was ranked by the CFA Institute, a "Top 20" all time in finance. The book discusses JP Morgan Chase's purchase of Bear Stearns and the bankruptcy of Lehman Brothers. The book was co-written with Patrick Robinson.

As of August 9, 2009, the book was 7th on the New York Times Best Seller list for hardcover nonfiction.

"A CFA Institute Top 20 All-Time – This book is a risk manager's guide to the right and wrong moves on Wall St., and explains why investors must stay ahead of policies coming out of Washington, D.C., and Europe." – CNBC.

A Colossal Failure of Common Sense is translated into 12 different languages.

=== How to Listen When Markets Speak: Risks, Myths and Investment Opportunities in a Radically Reshaped Economy ===
Following the success of his previous book, Lawrence published another book in spring of 2024. In How to Listen When Markets Speak Lawrence proposes the world is entering a high inflationary paradigm, using anecdotes from previous conversations with famous investors throughout his career and various economic trends as evidence.

He suggests (some of) the factors driving this change are:

- The west printing too many banknotes through Quantitative Easing (he notes that 40% of all US dollars were created between 2022 and 2024)
- A shift of industry from the west (especially America) to China
- America's overuse of sanctions resulting in a debasement of the Dollar as a reserve currency, resulting in foreign nations moving towards alternatives (namely the Yuan) to avoid the impact on their trade when these sanctions are used.

He suggests (some of) the effects will be:

- A Multi-polar world, in which America lacks the political power to maintain peace and prosperity for its allies. This will contribute to a higher frequency of warfare (he uses The war in Ukraine as an example). He speculates this will increase the cost of trade and damage the 'just in time' economy of the west.
- A megatrend tailwind in which growth stocks and passive investments become bearish
- An end of the 60% stocks 40% bonds "rule of thumb" portfolio

He suggests that readers should (among other things):

- Invest in "cold, hard assets", including rare minerals like lithium and cobalt (used in batteries), as well as gold and copper.
- Invest in some large mining companies.
- Move into value investments, which perform better in a high inflationary world.
- Have a 10% cash, 40% stocks, 30% bonds, 20% commodities portfolio for the 2020-2030 decade.

He also suggests that its 'too early' to switch to renewables, especially for countries like India, and thus Petroleum will continue to be an essential resource throughout the next decade.

The book was published in audio format on Spotify, read by Larry himself.
