= The Swap (TV series) =

2002 British crime drama TV series

- Genre: Crime drama Thriller
- Created by: Marc Blake
- Written by: Marc Blake
- Directed by: David Drury
- Starring: Jemma Redgrave; Michael Maloney; Jonathan Cake; John McGlynn; Lara Belmont; Phyllida Law
- Composer: Alan Parker
- Country of origin: United Kingdom
- Original language: English
- No. of series: 1
- No. of episodes: 2 (list of episodes)

Production
- Executive producer: Kobus Botha
- Producer: Jill Green
- Running time: 90 mins. (w/ advertisements)
- Production company: Granada Television

Original release
- Network: ITV
- Release: 10 February – 11 February 2002

The Swap is a British television crime drama series first broadcast on ITV in February 2002. The two-part serial stars Jemma Redgrave and Michael Maloney as a husband and wife who engage in a house swap with an Australian family for the Christmas holidays. However, the swap goes badly wrong and results in tragedy for both families involved. The serial achieved good viewing figures, upward of 8m.

The series was released on DVD on 4 April 2005.

== Critical reception ==
Critical reception of the series was mostly positive.

Tony Purnell of The Mirror said;

"The highly original, two-part thriller was beautifully acted by Jemma Redgrave, Michael Maloney and Jonathan Cake. It kept me guessing and kept me on the edge of my seat, where I'll be again tonight for the conclusion."

Gerard O'Donovan of The Daily Telegraph said;

"Marc Blake's nicely paced script and David Drury's stylish direction did a great job of translating a mundane, if deep-rooted, fear into an all too believable spine-chiller. Let's hope tonight's conclusion lives up to expectations."

However, Gareth McLean of The Guardian said of the series;

"In common with most middle-class people on television, Tom and Jen Forrester are awful. She is whiny, petulant and stupid and he is grumpy, brusque and priggish. Admittedly, we probably shouldn't take The Swap so seriously - what with it being such giddy hokum - but it would have been nice if it hadn't been quite so ridiculous."

== Cast ==
- Jemma Redgrave as Jen Forrester
- Michael Maloney as Tom Forrester
- Jonathan Cake as Charles Anderson
- John McGlynn as DCI Knowles
- Lara Belmont as Lissa Forrester
- Tessa Churcher as Sarah Jenkins
- Cate Fowler as Henrietta Collins
- Phyllida Law as Rose Trenchard
- Rachel O'Meara as Doctor Derby

== Episode list ==
No.	Title	Directed by	Written by	Original release date	UK viewers (millions)
1	"Episode 1"	David Drury	Marc Blake	10 February 2002	7.93m
Tom Forrester (Michael Maloney), a middle-aged businessman with a wife and two children, is too busy running his business to have enough time for his family. His wife, Jen (Jemma Redgrave), is a busy mother who is dissatisfied with her role, and regrets not having continued with her work. When Jen organises a house swap with the family of an Australian professor, Charles Anderson (Jonathan Cake), for the Christmas holidays, Tom agrees - unaware of what he has let himself in for.
2	"Episode 2"	David Drury	Marc Blake	11 February 2002	8.95m
With Tom and Jen still living the high life in Australia, Charles begins to steal various belongings from their house in England. Meanwhile, Tom's daughter, Lissa, becomes disturbed by her parents' constant bickering and decides to take action. Rose Trenchard, Tom and Jen's neighbour from back home in England, decides to give them a call when she spots suspicious activity going on at their house - leading Tom and Jen to jet back from the hot sun to find a tragic scene.
