= Alexander Stuart (writer) =

Novelist and screenwriter

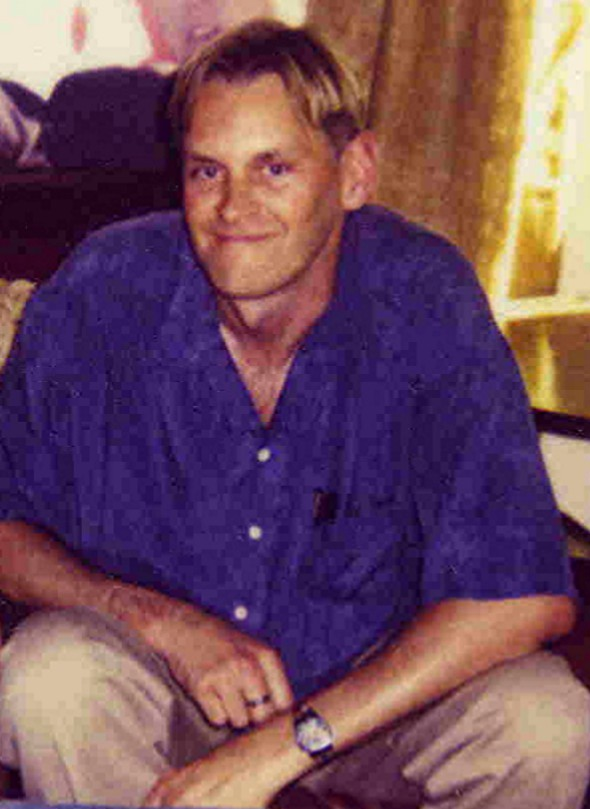
Alexander Stuart

Alexander Stuart is a British-born, Los Angeles–based novelist and screenwriter. Stuart's books include The War Zone, Tribes, Life On Mars (which inspired the British television documentary, The End of America), Five And A Half Times Three (written with Ann Totterdell, about the death from cancer of their five-and-a-half-year-old son, Joe Buffalo Stuart), and the children's books, Joe, Jo-Jo And The Monkey Masks and Henry And The Sea (written with Joe Buffalo Stuart). Stuart's books have been translated into eight languages and published in the United States, Britain, Europe, and Israel.

His most controversial novel, The War Zone, about a family torn apart by sexual abuse, was turned into a film by Oscar-nominated actor/director Tim Roth in 1999. At the time of the book's initial publication in 1989, it was stripped of the Whitbread Best Novel Award amid controversy over its depiction of incest, with one judge describing it as "repellent" and threatening to resign from the panel if Stuart received the award.

A major influence on Stuart's life and work, particularly The War Zone, was the loss of his first son in 1989.

In addition to scripting Roth's film of The War Zone, Stuart also served as executive producer of Nicolas Roeg's Insignificance, based on Terry Johnson's play, which brought together a fictionalized Marilyn Monroe, Albert Einstein, Joe DiMaggio and Senator Joe McCarthy, on a single night in New York.

Before moving to the United States, Stuart lived in London and Brighton, England. During the 1990s, he moved to Miami Beach, where he taught screenwriting at the University of Miami. In 1997, he was commissioned by the Miami Art Museum to create an artwork, Filmloop/Fragments, to accompany a sculpture installation by the Polish artist, Magdalena Abakanowicz. He currently lives in Los Angeles, with his wife and their two children. On September 22, 2006, Stuart was sworn in as an American citizen.
