= Crime and Punishment (2002 TV series) =

- Genre: Crime drama
- Created by: Fyodor Dostoevsky
- Written by: Tony Marchant
- Directed by: Julian Jarrold
- Starring: John Simm; Ian McDiarmid; Shaun Dingwall; Geraldine James; Kate Ashfield; Lara Belmont; Mark Benton; Katrin Cartlidge
- Composer: Adrian Johnston
- Country of origin: United Kingdom
- Original language: English
- No. of series: 1
- No. of episodes: 2

Production
- Executive producers: Kate Harwood; Jane Tranter
- Producer: David Snodin
- Cinematography: Eigil Bryld
- Editor: Chris Gill
- Running time: 90 minutes
- Production company: BBC Worldwide

Original release
- Network: BBC Two
- Release: 12 February – 13 February 2002

Crime and Punishment is a two-part British television crime drama series based upon the 1866 novel of the same name by Fyodor Dostoevsky, which first broadcast on BBC2 on 12 February 2002. The novel was adapted for television by playwright Tony Marchant, and was directed by Julian Jarrold.

John Simm stars as Rodya Raskolnikov, a former student who plans the murder of a pawnbroker to alleviate his financial problems, but also as an existential exercise, feeling himself able to commit such acts without guilt, remorse or justification. The series was broadcast over two consecutive nights, airing in the 9:00-10:30pm slot. The series was released on DVD on 25 August 2008, via 2|Entertain.

== Production ==
The series was filmed in St. Petersburg. Simm said of his role as Raskolnikov; "The hard job for me is to make the viewer understand why Raskolnikov kills. But that is helped by seeing the place that he has to live in, it was absolutely disgusting. He is a very intelligent guy, who is slowly driven to madness by the things he sees around him."

== Reception ==
The series gathered mixed reviews in the press, with The Guardian claiming that "As Raskolnikov, the murderer, John Simm is the spindle the whole thing whirls around. He gives a vivid performance and looks like a vicious angel. In the current Augean state of the stables, I am not able to find fault with this well-bred winner"; while The Telegraph were more scathing, writing "It's as if scriptwriter Tony Marchant and director Julian Jarrold had decided to take the setting and crime-drama structure of Crime and Punishment and ditch the philosophical core, the engine that gives everything meaning."

== Cast ==
- John Simm as Rodya Raskolnikov
- Ian McDiarmid as Detective Porfiry
- Shaun Dingwall as Razumikhin
- Geraldine James as Pulcheria
- Kate Ashfield as Dounia
- Lara Belmont as Sonya
- Mark Benton as Zosimov
- Katrin Cartlidge as Katerina
- Alice Connor as Polya
- David Haig as Luzhin
- Martin Hancock as Koch
- Anna Hope as Nastasya
- Philip Jackson as Marmeladov
- Sean McKenzie as Semyonobvich
- Roger Morlidge as Lt. Gunpowder
- Jake Nightingale as Artisan
- Tim Potter as Nikolai
- Nigel Terry as Svidrigailov
- Darren Tighe as Zamyotov
- Heather Tobias as Lizaveta

== Episodes ==
No. overall	No. in series	Title	Directed by	Written by	Original release date	Viewers (millions)
1	1	"Part 1"	Julian Jarrold	Tony Marchant	12 February 2002	1.98
Raskolnikov is a penniless young man incensed at the injustice he sees around him. Believing no one will miss her, he decides to rob and kill an old woman. But his own guilty conscience and the psychological skills of the murder investigator prove to be his undoing.
2	2	"Part 2"	Julian Jarrold	Tony Marchant	13 February 2002	N/A
Still haunted by his crime, Raskolnikov is visited in St Petersburg by his mother and sister Dunya, both of whom are alarmed by his worsening condition. Meanwhile, a dogged Porfiry remains on Raskolnikov's trail, convinced of his guilt but lacking conclusive evidence.
