= Diamond Girl (film) =

- DVD cover
- Genre: Romance, drama
- Based on: Diamond Girl by Diana Palmer
- Written by: Charles Lazer
- Directed by: Timothy Bond
- Starring: Jonathan Cake; Joely Collins; Kevin Otto
- Theme music composer: Tim McCauley
- Countries of origin: Canada, South Africa
- Original language: English

Production
- Producer: Randall Torno
- Cinematography: Buster Reynolds
- Editor: Bill Goddard
- Running time: 92 minutes
- Production companies: Alliance Communications Corporation; Film Afrika Worldwide; Baton; Showtime Networks

Original release
- Network: Showtime
- Release: June 13, 1998

Diamond Girl is a 1998 Canadian-South African romance drama television film directed by Timothy Bond and starring Jonathan Cake, Joely Collins, and Kevin Otto. Written by Charles Lazer and based on the novel Diamond Girl by Diana Palmer, the film is about a young paralegal who is secretly in love with her boss, a carefree lawyer who manages his family's Napa Valley vineyard. While he negotiates the sale of the vineyard, his high-powered attorney brother arrives from London and takes control of negotiations. As the deal progresses, the paralegal's affections are torn between the two brothers.

== Plot ==
Claire Barnard (Joely Collins), an unassuming paralegal, works in a small law office for Denny Montana (Kevin Otto), a carefree lawyer more interested in playing tennis and chasing women than he is in his work. Claire's quiet efficiency is largely responsible for Denny's successful law practice. After her parents died in a car accident, Claire looked after her younger brother Sean. In the four years she's worked for Denny, Claire has kept her romantic feelings for him to herself.

Denny's haughty older brother Regan Montana (Jonathan Cake) arrives from London and quickly takes over Claire's office and the planned merger negotiations. Fearing his younger brother has been talked into a poor agreement by attractive real estate broker Margo De La Vera, Regan knows he can get a lot more money for his family's award-winning Napa Hills winery.

Regan soon learns that Claire was responsible for drafting the details of the proposed merger, and realizes that he will need her help. He is suspicious of the motives of the prospective buyer, Jean-Marc Bernier. To impress Bernier, he takes Claire to a makeover spa and provides her with expensive stylish clothes, transforming the unassuming paralegal into a glamorous woman. Denny and Margo are both impressed and surprised by her transformation.

Regan explains to Claire that Margo has Denny unwilling to hold out for more money. Regan proposes a plan intending to use Denny's competitive nature to his advantage by pretending to be in love with Claire, which he knows will turn Denny's attention away from Margo and to Claire.

Claire and Regan conclude that Bernier intends to bottle cheap wine from his other holdings with the Napa Hill label. As their charade continues, Claire begins to fall in love with Regan. Meanwhile, Denny grows increasingly jealous and when Regan leaves town for a few days, Denny asks Claire to dinner. During the romantic dinner, Regan shows up unexpectedly and breaks up the date—clearly jealous.

Bernier eventually agrees to Regan's demand for an additional two million dollars. At Napa Hills, Regan confesses to Claire his unhappiness with selling the property that was first purchased by his grandfather. Regan's mother Abby (Dyan Cannon) hopes that they will not sell and that Regan will stay and manage the vineyard himself. Regan shows Claire the property, and the two share an intimate kiss. Later, however, Claire is heartbroken when she overhears Regan telling his mother that he plans to leave for London. Denny arrives to see Claire crying and confesses that it was competition with Regan that drove him to pursue her. He talks her into pretending to be in love with him in order to make Regan jealous.

At the closing, Regan makes additional demands and negotiations eventually fall apart. That night, after seeing his brother kiss Claire, Regan comes to Claire's room and the two make passionate love. The next morning, Regan attempts to leave for London—unable to commit to his feelings for Claire—but Denny talks him into returning to her, telling him that he has to stop running away from the things he loves. Back at the vineyard, Regan finally confesses his love to Claire, and the two begin a new life together at Napa Hills.

== Cast ==
- Jonathan Cake as Regan Montana
- Joely Collins as Claire Barnard
- Kevin Otto as Denny Montana
- Royston Stoffels as Jean-Marc Bernier
- Stacey Sacks as Lori
- Blair Slater as Sean Barnard
- Denise Virieux as Margo De La Vera
- Dyan Cannon as Abby Montana
- Paddy Canavan as Mrs. Rose
- Jacqui Singer as Spa Hostess
- Terence Bridgett as Hairstylist
- Diane Wilson as Sales Clerk
- Zaa Nkweta as Courier
- Blaise Koch as Maitre'D
- Nicholas Dallas as Waiter
- Jason Crook as Doorman
- Roger Lucey as Taxi Driver

== Production ==
=== Filming ===
Diamond Girl was filmed on location in Toronto, Ontario, Canada and Cape Town, Western Cape, South Africa.

== Releases ==
Diamond Girl was released on DVD on February 6, 2008, by Lionsgate as part of the Harlequin Romance Series.
