= Barracuda 945 =

2002 novel by Patrick Robinson

Barracuda 945 is a naval thriller written in 2003 by Patrick Robinson. It is the sixth book to feature Arnold Morgan as a main character. The book follows Major Ray Kerman as he attempts to "acquire a nuclear submarine, train a crew, sail the Pacific and bring the United States to its knees."

== Critical reception ==
Al Hutchison of The Tampa Tribune called the book a "gripping tale".
