= Noah's Ark (miniseries) =

- DVD cover art
- Written by: Peter Barnes
- Directed by: John Irvin
- Starring: Jon Voight; Mary Steenburgen; F. Murray Abraham; Carol Kane; Jonathan Cake; Alexis Denisof; Emily Mortimer; Sydney Tamiia Poitier; James Coburn
- Music by: Paul Grabowsky
- Country of origin: United States
- Original language: English

Production
- Executive producer: Robert Halmi Sr.
- Producer: Stephen Jones
- Cinematography: Mike Molloy
- Editor: Ian Crafford
- Running time: 180 minutes
- Production company: Hallmark Entertainment
- Budget: $30 million

Original release
- Network: NBC
- Release: May 2 – May 3, 1999

Noah's Ark is a 1999 American-Australian television miniseries directed by John Irvin and starring Jon Voight, Mary Steenburgen, F. Murray Abraham, Carol Kane, Jonathan Cake, Alexis Denisof, Emily Mortimer, Sydney Tamiia Poitier, and James Coburn. The film is a fictional adaptation of Noah's Ark from the Book of Genesis. It was initially televised in the United States, that same year, was also televised in Canada, Germany and Portugal, among other countries.

== Plot ==
The film portrays Noah as a resident of Sodom who is fighting against its equally wicked neighbor Gomorrah and vice versa simply for the amusement of their residents. During the fight, Lot, Noah's friend, is injured in the fight, and comes to Noah for help. At the end of the fight, the leader of Gomorrah is killed with his head chopped off and put on a stake, as Sodom claims victory. The next day, Noah's sons excitedly ask their father if he took part in the deadly fight. God then asks Noah to go to Mount Tubac, where God reveals that the wickedness of Sodom and Gomorrah has provoked God to destroy the cities.

After Noah fails to find ten righteous people other than Lot and his wife, Noah and his family flee the city with Lot and his wife, who looks back at Sodom as it, along with Gomorrah, is being destroyed by fire and brimstone and turns into a pillar of salt.

The next day, they encounter a peddler selling household goods including pots, pans, hats, etc., which is believed to be God in disguise.

Ten years later, Noah and his family are skilled farmers, and his sons are now adults. Lot is also now a criminal, as he kills another man for his shoes, and reveals that he used to have faith in God after He sent down the fire and brimstone to Sodom and Gomorrah, but his faith didn't bring him any money, and so he turned to the false gods of the other pagan cultures. One of the sons finds Ruth's mother crying because her daughter Ruth has been kidnapped by three priests of Mole, the rain god, and will be offered as a sacrifice to Mole in the temple of the god. When Noah is notified by his sons, he warns the people in the temple, who are cheerfully waiting for Ruth to be sacrificed, that they will suffer a worse punishment than the people of Sodom and Gomorrah did, and God rips the roof of the temple off and sends thunder and snakes into the building, while striking the three priests with dumbness, blindness and deafness.

God later reveals his plan to flood the world as well, and tells Noah to build an ark to preserve life. Two of every species of animal going to the ark pass through the village, which makes the villagers form an angry mob to get revenge. When the rain starts, the villagers start to celebrate as it had not rained in years, but Noah and his family quickly board the ark with all the animals and he decided send the boys to bring three girls onboard: Miriam, Esther and Ruth. As the world starts to flood with all of their citizens drowning, Ruth is instructed to come without her mother though she resists doing so at first, and all of Noah's family is safe.

Many days have now passed since the flood, the same peddler they encountered the day after Sodom and Gomorrah were destroyed by God appears in his now water-converted transportation to give them more supplies.

The village leader and Lot are still alive and they have formed boats of their own. Lot has now become commander after killing the village leader in a fight. He orders the people on the boat to take over the ark, using ropes to try climbing over, but are beaten by Noah and his family with the help of the animals. God then sends a tidal wave going toward the boat, killing everyone.

After many months of trials, Noah and his family are finally free from the ark as it lands on Mount Ararat, and a new life on Earth begins.

== Cast ==
- Jon Voight – Noah and the uncredited voice of God
- Mary Steenburgen – Naamah
- F. Murray Abraham – Lot
- Carol Kane – Sarah
- Mark Bazeley – Shem
- Jonathan Cake – Japheth
- Alexis Denisof – Ham
- Emily Mortimer – Esther
- Sydney Tamiia Poitier – Ruth
- Sonya Walger – Miriam
- James Coburn – The Peddler
- Max Phipps – Jezer
- Terry Norris – High Priest
- Jonathan Biggins – First Priest
- Monica Maughan – Rachel

== Reception ==
Noah's Ark was critically panned for its creative liberties, rambling plot with inaccurate rendering of the Bible characters and irreverent portrayal of Biblical subjects. It confuses the Genesis accounts of Noah and the Deluge (Genesis 6-9) with the narrative of his distant descendants, Abraham and Lot (Genesis 13 and 17-19). Various scenes in the film were seen as recycled tropes from the post-apocalyptic genre; a scene in which Lot leads a band of pirates in an attack on the Ark was compared to Waterworld. Even so, the second night set a movie ratings mark for NBC that it did not pass again until 2004.

The Malaysian government banned the film from being televised in the country under laws that prohibit any televised depiction of the prophets of Islam, including Noah and Lot.
