= Cows (TV series) =

1997 British television sitcom

Cows is a British sitcom produced by Eddie Izzard for Channel 4 in 1997, where all actors appeared in cow suits. Only the pilot episode was produced by Channel 4 and the show never went into series production. It was written by Nick Whitby and Izzard, and starred Pam Ferris and James Fleet. It was produced by David Tyler.

== Production ==
No comedy pilot had cost Channel 4 more in recent years than Cows. Filming for the 60-minute pilot episode took place over eight days. Six days were spent on site with an additional two spent in the studio. For 12 hours each day, five performers were suited up in cow outfits. Izzard described the show as "this Planet of the Apes type thing but with a Simpsons feel to it.

== Reception ==
According to the Daily Mirror, critics widely criticised the pilot episode of Cows. William Cook of The Guardian called Cows a "bizarre bovine sitcom" in which performers suited up in cow outfits "chew metaphorical and literal cud in suburban semi". The Sunday Times television critic Roland White could have had the crowd rolling with laughter through his "cow-human jokes" in his solo act but "his style has not transferred well to sitcom". Jasper Rees of The Independent stated, "Somewhere between Wodehouse's Blandings and Orwell's Animal Farm, it spares Andrew Davies the trouble of having to convert either."
