= Lara Belmont =

English actress

- Born: 1980 (age 45–46); Oxford, Oxfordshire, United Kingdom
- Occupation: Actress

Lara Belmont (born 1980) is an English actress, best known for her role as Jessie in the 1999 film The War Zone. She also appeared in ITV's lavish costume drama Henry VIII as his eldest daughter Mary Tudor.

Belmont was born in Oxford, and worked as a model before she was spotted in the street by a casting director.

== Selected filmography ==
- 1999 The War Zone
- 2002 Ashes and Sand
- 2002 The Swap
- 2002 Long Time Dead
- 2002 Crime and Punishment
- 2003 Oh Marbella!
- 2003 Killing Hitler
- 2003 Henry VIII
- 2005 Take Me Back
- 2006 Someone Else
- 2007 Rise of the Footsoldier
- 2009 Wild Decembers
- 2020 Winifred Meeks
