= Phyllida Law =

Scottish actress (1932–2026)

Phyllida Law OBE
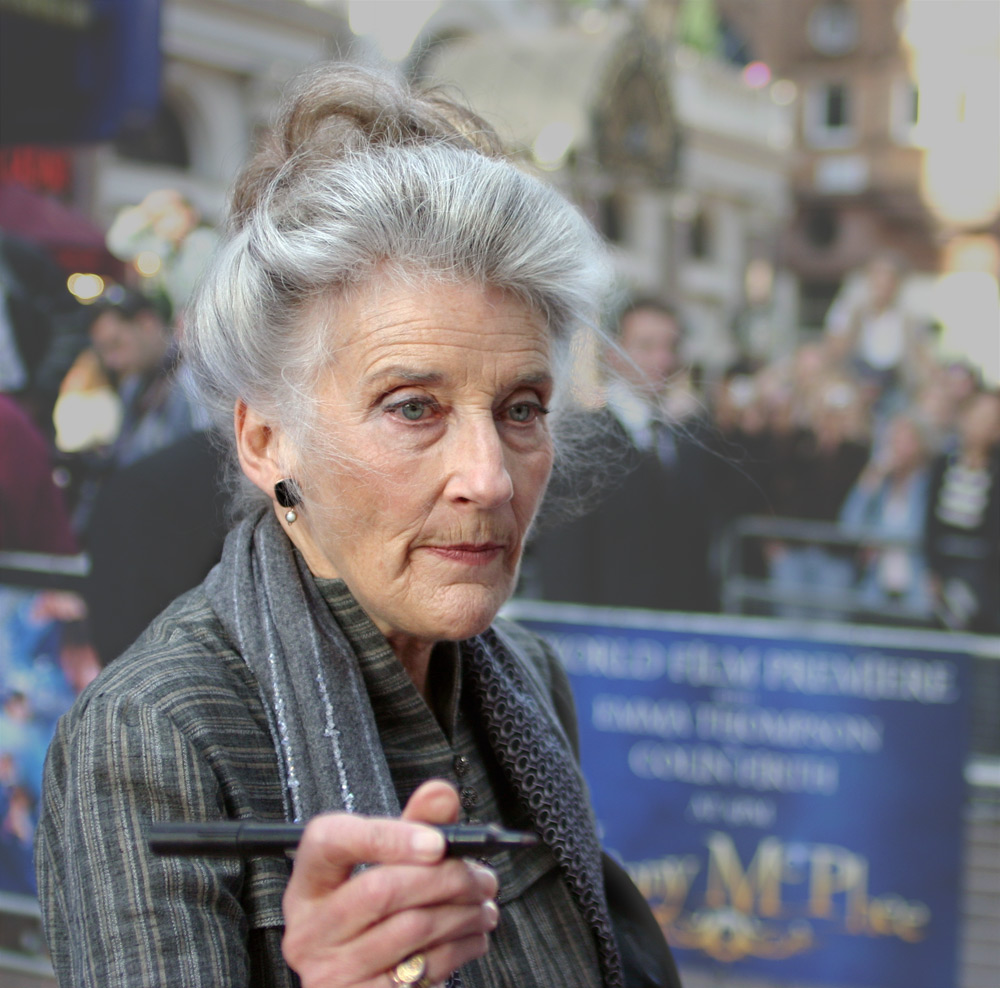
- Law in 2005
- Born: Phyllida Ann Law; 6 July 1932; Glasgow, Scotland
- Died: 27 July 2026 (aged 94)
- Occupation: Actress
- Years active: 1958–2024
- Spouse: Eric Thompson (m. 1957; died 1982)
- Children: Emma Thompson; Sophie Thompson
- Honours: Honorary degree, Glasgow Caledonian University

Phyllida Ann Law OBE (6 July 1932 − 27 July 2026) was a Scottish television, film and stage actress. Having trained at the Bristol Old Vic Theatre School, she appeared in television series such as Dixon of Dock Green, Rumpole of the Bailey, Kingdom and Foyle's War. Her film credits included Peter's Friends (1992), Much Ado About Nothing (1993) and The Winter Guest (1997). Her daughters Emma and Sophie Thompson are also actresses.

== Early life and education ==
Phyllida Ann Law was born on 6 July 1932 in Glasgow, Scotland, the daughter of Meg "Mego" and William Law, a journalist. Prior to the Second World War, her father was a newspaper journalist with the Glasgow Herald who, she recalled, "kept odd hours"; when the war broke out, he went into the Royal Air Force and separated from his wife. Later, they were divorced. Law would not see her father again until she was 18. Law's mother Meg worked in a dress shop in Glasgow during the war. The family also included Law's brother, James, her elder by five years, and their maternal grandmother, the wife of a Presbyterian minister, and "a fierce Presbyterian" herself whom Law "did not like as a child but can now admire".

She attended Glasgow Girls High up to age seven. The war began in September 1939 and Law and her brother were evacuated to family friends outside Glasgow in Lenzie, East Dunbartonshire, and attended a local school there, before Law transferred to Skelmorlie, Ayrshire, and then a school near the Clyde. At 13 she passed an entrance exam for Badminton School in Bristol, and became a boarder there. Leaving the school at 17, she initially accepted a place at university to read French and Literature, but disliked the experience and left. She then auditioned for the Bristol Old Vic Theatre School, intending to train as a stage designer, and discovered – by "happy mistake" – that she wanted to act instead.

== Career ==
Law worked extensively in television, including appearances in Dixon of Dock Green, Rumpole of the Bailey and the 1972 adaptation of the Lord Peter Wimsey tale The Unpleasantness at the Bellona Club. She appeared in films such as Peter's Friends (1992), Much Ado About Nothing (1993) (playing Ursula, alongside daughter Emma as Beatrice) and The Winter Guest (1997) (playing Elspeth, alongside daughter Emma as Frances).

She was in the original London cast of La Cage aux Folles at the London Palladium in 1986, playing the role of Jacqueline.

In 2004, she guest-starred in the Rosemary & Thyme episode entitled "Orpheus in the Undergrowth" as May Beauchamp. In 2007 she guest-starred in two Doctor Who spin-off adventures: as Bea Nelson-Stanley in The Sarah Jane Adventures story "Eye of the Gorgon" and as Beldonia in the audio drama Doctor Who: The Bride of Peladon. In 1963 Law had auditioned for one of the original four regular leads in Doctor Who, "Miss McGovern". She did not win the part, the name of which was subsequently changed to Barbara Wright.

Also in 2007 she played Aunt Auriel in the drama Kingdom starring Stephen Fry. In 2008 she appeared as a guest star in Foyle's War.

In November 2009, Law published her first memoir. Notes to my Mother-In-Law (OCLC 428774714) concerns the 17 years Law's mother-in-law lived with the family from the mid-1960s until her death. In January 2010 she appeared with Tony Slattery on Ready Steady Cook. She starred alongside John Hurt in a short film entitled Love at First Sight which was shortlisted for an Oscar in 2012.

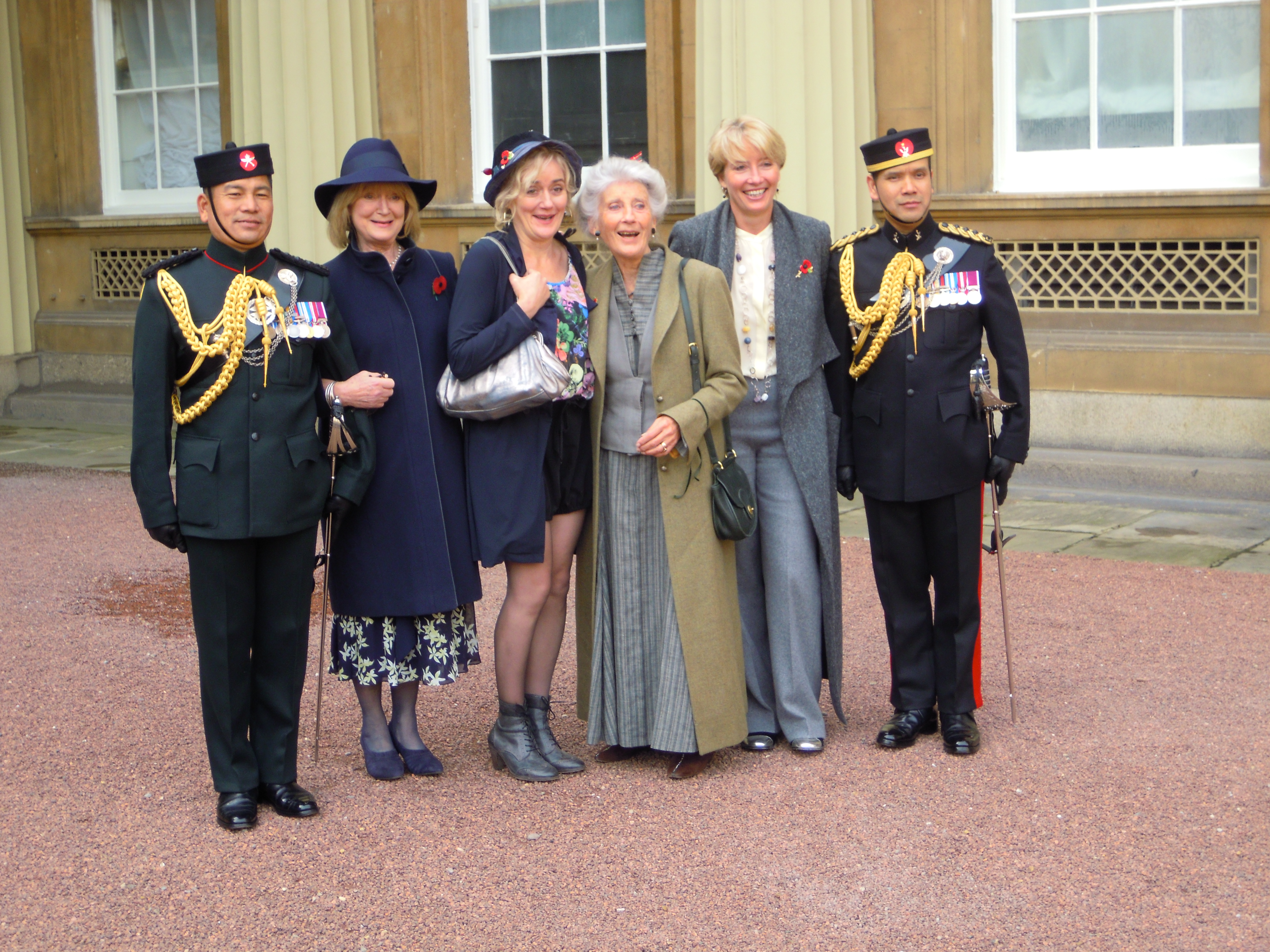
Phyllida Law (centre) flanked by her daughters Sophie Thompson and Emma Thompson on receiving her OBE at Buckingham Palace

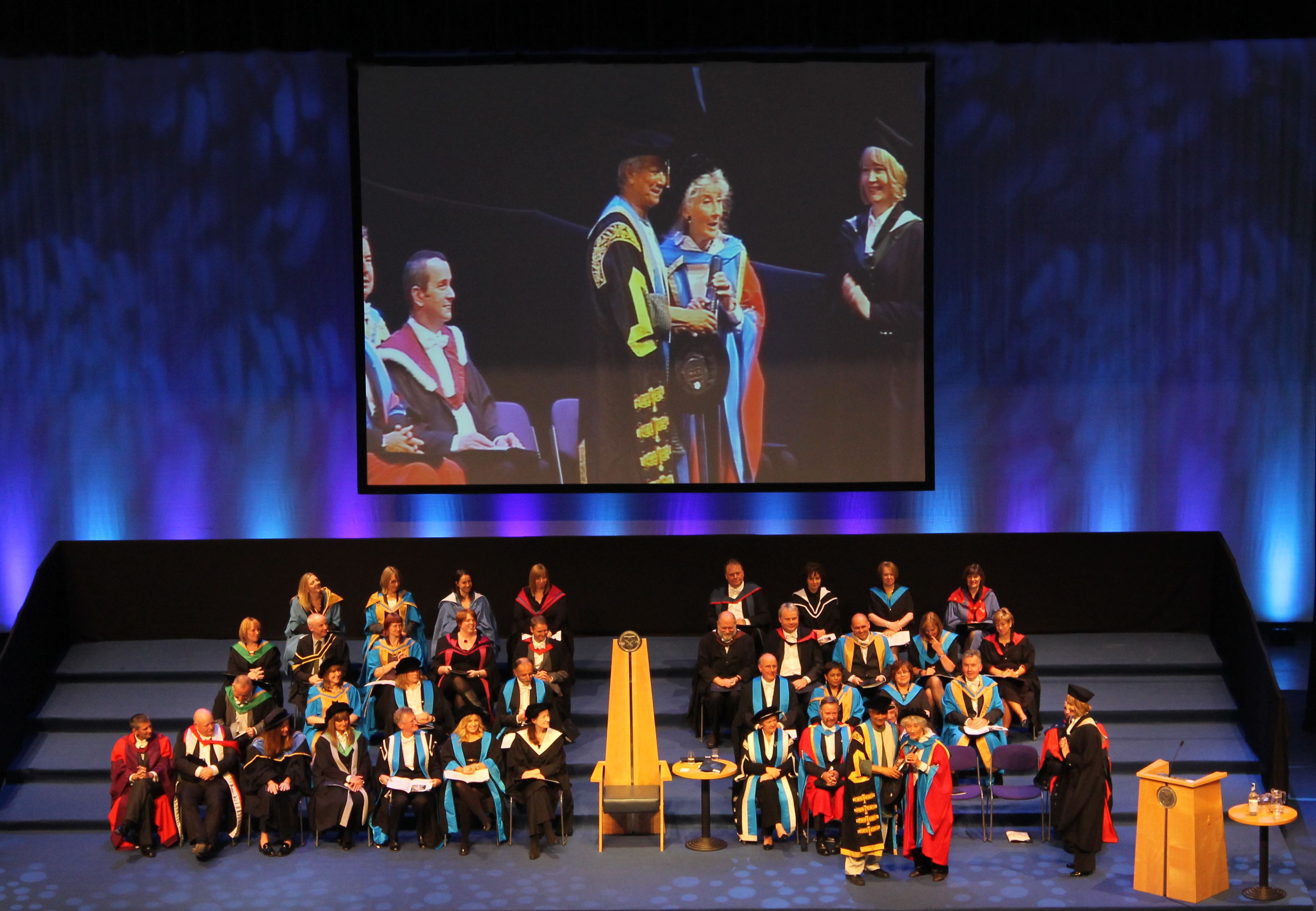
Phyllida Law receives the honorary doctorate from the hands of Muhammad Yunus, chancellor of Glasgow Caledonian University (4 July 2013).

== Personal life ==
Law met fellow actor Eric Thompson while working at the Old Vic theatre in London in the 1950s. They were married from 1957 until his death in 1982. Their daughters Emma and Sophie Thompson are both actresses.

Law developed Parkinson's disease in later life and died on 27 July 2026, aged 94.

== Awards ==
In 2013 Law received an Honorary Doctorate from Glasgow Caledonian University and an Honorary Doctor of Letters from the Royal Conservatoire of Scotland.

== Honours ==
Law was appointed an Officer of the Order of the British Empire (OBE) in the 2014 Birthday Honours by Queen Elizabeth II for services to drama and for charitable services.

== Filmography ==
=== Film ===
Year	Title	Role(s)	Notes
1968	Otley	Jean	
1973	Hitler: The Last Ten Days	Constanze Manziarly	
1989	Tree of Hands	Julia	
1992	Peter's Friends	Vera	
1993	Much Ado About Nothing	Ursula	
1994	Before the Rain	Mother	
1994	Junior	Dr. Talbot	Uncredited
1996	Emma	Mrs. Bates	
1997	Anna Karenina	Vronskaya	
1997	The Winter Guest	Elspeth	
1999	Mad Cows	Lady Drake	
2000	Saving Grace	Margaret Sutton	
2002	The Time Machine	Mrs. Watchit	
2003	I’ll Be There	Mrs. Williams	
2005	Nanny McPhee	Mrs. Partridge	Voice
2005	Danny the Dog	Distinguished Lady	
2005	Mee-Shee: The Water Giant	Mrs. Coogan	
2006	Day of Wrath	Esperanza de Mendoza	
2006	Miss Potter	Louisa Warne	
2007	The Waiting Room	Helen	
2010	Ways to Live Forever	Grandmother	
2010	Love at First Sight	Ruth	Short film
2010	Arrietty	Sadako	UK English dub
2011	Albert Nobbs	Mrs. Cavendish	
2014	A Little Chaos	Suzanne	
2016	Bakery in Brooklyn	iPad Baker	
2020	Then Came You	Arlene Awd	

=== Partial television credits ===
Year	Title	Role	Notes
1960	ITV Television Playhouse	Julia Cathart	Episode: "Missing from Home"
1964–1966	Play School	Nurse / Presenter	75 episodes
1971	Play For Today	The Wife	Episode "Evelyn"
1972	The Unpleasantness at the Bellona Club	Marjorie Phelps	2 episodes
1973	A Picture of Katherine Mansfield	Linda Burnell / Mother / Mrs. Beauchamp / Mrs. Sheridan	5 episodes
1978	Come Back, Lucy	Aunt Gwen	6 episodes
1982	The Barchester Chronicles	Mrs. Stanhope	Episode: "Part Three"
1984	Strangers and Brothers	Mrs. Henneker	Episode: "11"
1987	Rumpole of the Bailey	Honoria Bird	Episode: "Rumpole and the Blind Tasting"
1988–1992	That's Love	Babs	10 episodes
1989	Agatha Christie's Poirot	Lady Carrington	Episode: "The Incredible Theft"
1992	The House of Eliott	Edith Duglass	Episode: "2.3"
1994	Taggart	Joan Mathieson	Episode: "Forbidden Fruit"
1994	The Blue Boy	Marie's Mother	TV movie
1994	Heartbeat	Nancy Bellow	Episode: "Witch Hunt"
1999	Midsomer Murders	Felicity Dinsdale	Episode: "Blood Will Out"
1999	The Magical Legend of the Leprechauns	Lady Margaret	TV movie
2002	Monarch of the Glen	Isobel Hogg	Episode: "4.2"
2002	The Swap	Rose Trenchard	TV movie
2003	Brush with Fate	Maria	TV movie
2004	Waking the Dead	Mrs. Carstairs	Episode: "The Hardest Word"
2004	Rosemary & Thyme	May Beauchamp	Episode: "Orpheus in the Undergrowth"
2005	Afterlife	Irene Moser	Episode: "The 7:59 Club"
2006	Pinochet in Suburbia	Lucía Hiriart	TV movie
2007	The Sarah Jane Adventures	Bea Nelson-Stanley	Serial: Eye of the Gorgon
2007	Miss Austen Regrets	Cassandra Leigh Austen	TV movie
2007–2009	Kingdom	Aunt Auriel	16 episodes
2008	Foyle's War	Lady Muriel Sackville	Episode: "Broken Souls"
2010	Doc Martin	Mrs. McLynn	Episode: "Driving Mr McLynn"
2010	Agatha Christie's Poirot	Mrs. Llewellyn-Smythe	Episode: "Hallowe'en Party"
2011	The Bleak Old Shop of Stuff	Aunt Sobriety	Episode: "Christmas Special"
2011	Midsomer Murders	Mary Bingham	Episode: "Dark Secrets"
2013	New Tricks	Eliza Belgrade	Episode: "Into the Woods "

== Published works ==
- Law, Phyllida (2009). Notes to my Mother-in-Law. Fourth Estate. ISBN 978-0007338412.
- Law, Phyllida (2013). How Many Camels Are There in Holland?: Dementia, Ma and Me. Fourth Estate. ISBN 978-0007485864.
- Law, Phyllida (2017). Dead Now of Course. Fourth Estate. ISBN 978-0008244743.
