= U.S.S. Seawolf (novel) =

2000 novel by Patrick Robinson

USS Seawolf
- Author: Patrick Robinson
- Genre: Thriller
- Published: 2000
- Preceded by: H.M.S. Unseen
- Followed by: The Shark Mutiny

USS Seawolf is a naval thriller published in 2000 by best selling author Patrick Robinson. It is the fourth book to feature Arnold Morgan as a main character. The second edition was published in 2005 with a new cover picture painted by Larry Rostant.

== Plot summary ==
The story begins with a United States Navy submarine, the USS Seawolf (SSN-21), on a mission to spy on the new Chinese nuclear missile submarine. The mission is successful until the submarine's second-in-command, the president's son Linus Clark makes a fatal error, and the submarine collides with a sonar array from a Chinese ship that is searching for them. The crew is imprisoned and tortured while the Chinese begin to strip the captured submarine for its secrets. Desperately, Arnold Morgan, the National Security Advisor, plans a mission to get the crew back, safeguard the sub's secrets, and punish the Chinese. He sends Navy SEALs to the island where survivors are being held and an American FA-18 Hornet to destroy the USS Seawolf which is being held in Canton harbor.

But after the daring mission, several high-ranking U.S. Navy personnel and several members of the Joint Chiefs of Staff resign when the president prevents his son from facing a court-martial for his part in the loss of the Seawolf. In an angry fit of revenge, the President uses his considerable influence to have the Seawolf's commander, court-martialed for not being on the bridge at the time of Linus' error. This causes Morgan to resign and destroys the president's credibility in the military, as well as destroying the president's ability to lead in a crisis situation. In a later novel, Robinson continues to build on the conflict between the discredited president and the military by further developing the character of Arnold Morgan.

The novel identifies the Type 094 as "Xia III-class." The Type 094 submarine does exist, but its NATO reporting name is "Jin-class." And a "Xia Class" submarine does exist, though only a single Xia Class boat was made. It is not known if this somewhat jumbled name is an error, or simply artistic license taken by the author since the Type-094 is an improved design based on the original Xia Class submarine (Type 092), although the Type 093 submarine is an attack submarine and not a missile submarine.
