= True Blue: The Oxford Boat Race Mutiny =

1989 book by Dan Topolski and Patrick

- Paperback cover
- Author: Dan Topolski and Patrick Robinson
- Language: English
- Genre: Non-fiction
- Publisher: Bantam Books
- Publication date: 1989
- Publication place: United Kingdom
- Media type: Print (hardcover and paperback)
- Pages: 320 pp.
- ISBN: 0-553-40003-7
- OCLC: 22003117

True Blue: The Oxford Boat Race Mutiny is a non-fiction book written by Dan Topolski and Patrick Robinson and published in 1989. It tells the story of the 1987 Oxford–Cambridge Boat Race and the disagreement amongst the Oxford crew known as the "Oxford mutiny". It won the William Hill Sports Book of the Year in 1989, the award's inaugural year.

Topolski was Oxford's rowing coach, and the book describes his conflicts with the squad and principally five US international oarsmen who were enrolled that year at Oxford. Disagreements over training methods and crew selection ultimately led to the Americans leaving the crew shortly before the race. With a severely depleted crew, still suffering from the fall-out of the "mutiny", Oxford went on to beat Cambridge in the 1987 Boat Race.

== Reception and other accounts ==
The book, and the "mutiny" itself, continue to divide rowers even 29 years afterwards. British Olympic champion oarsman Martin Cross describes the book as "... one of the most entertaining (if not wholly accurate) sports books ever written ...", and refers to its treatment of one of the American "mutineers", Chris Clark, in the following terms: "As character assassinations go, it is ruthless."

Alison Gill, an Oxford oarswoman at the time of the "mutiny", wrote The Yanks at Oxford, a book that attempted to counter the perceived bias in Topolski's account.

== See also ==
- True Blue, a 1996 film based on the book
