= Daniel Topolski =

British rower

Personal information
- Nationality: British
- Born: 4 June 1945 London, England,
- Died: 21 February 2015 (aged 69) London, England
- Education: Westminster School; New College, Oxford
- Occupations: Rower, rowing coach, commentator, writer
- Spouse: Susan Gilmore

Sport
- Club: London RC
Medal record
Men's rowing
Representing Great Britain
World Rowing Championships
Gold medal – first place	1977 Amsterdam	Lwt eight
Silver medal – second place	1975 Nottingham	Lwt four

Daniel Topolski (4 June 1945 – 21 February 2015) was a British writer, rower, rowing coach and commentator. He studied at the University of Oxford where he represented the Blue boat twice, in 1967 and 1968. In 1977, he won a gold medal at the World Rowing Championships. He coached the Oxford University Boat Club crew fifteen times, leading them to victory twelve times, including a ten-win streak. He also coached British squads at two Olympic Games. After retiring from coaching he commentated on rowing at the Olympic Games and Boat Races.

== Early life ==
The son of the Polish artist Feliks Topolski and actress Marian Everall, Daniel attended the Lycée Français Charles de Gaulle in London, before going to Westminster School and New College, Oxford, where he read geography. He was taught sculling by his father, on Regent's Park lake in London, and captained Westminster School's boat club for two consecutive years. While at Oxford, he rowed in the University Boat Race twice. In the 1967 race, rowing at number seven, he helped Oxford to their third consecutive victory. In 1968, this time rowing at bow, he suffered defeat. Relatively lightly built for a rower, he gained 24 pounds (11 kg) to qualify for the 1967 race.

== Career ==
Topolski's rowing career included a gold medal in the 1977 World Championships in Amsterdam, in the lightweight eight, and a silver medal in the 1975 World Rowing Championships in Nottingham, in the lightweight coxless four. During his rowing career, Topolski took part in 74 races at the Henley Royal Regatta. He won three Henley trophies, the Wyfold in 1969 and the Britannia in 1970 with London Rowing Club, and the Britannia for the second time in 1976 with Tideway Scullers. He was elected a steward of the regatta in 1991

He was the finishing coach for Oxford University's Boat Race crew from 1973 to 1987. Of the fifteen Boat Races in which he was coach, Oxford won twelve including an unbroken run of ten victories between 1976 and 1985. This run of success and its continuation after Topolski's departure brought Oxford to a point in 1992 where they had won sixteen of the last seventeen races and were within one victory of equalling Cambridge's overall total of wins.

Topolski coached the British rowing squads competing at the 1980 and 1984 Olympics. He also coached the British women's eight between 1978 and 1980. He acted as a commentator for the BBC at the 2000 Sydney, 2004 Athens, 2008 Beijing Olympics and on home waters at the 2012 London Olympics.

Outside rowing, Topolski worked as a researcher for the BBC until 1973. He published two travel books. Muzungu: One Man's Africa (1976) was based on his travels in Africa for eight months in 1972. Travels with My Father: A South American Journey (1983) was based on a tour of South America with his father in 1981, which resulted in his arrest and imprisonment in Paraguay. He also published two books about rowing, The Oxford Revival (1985) and True Blue: The Oxford Boat Race Mutiny (1989; with Patrick Robinson). He wrote for The Observer for more than twenty years.

== Awards ==
Topolski won the inaugural William Hill Sports Book of the Year in 1989 as the co-author, with Patrick Robinson, of True Blue: The Oxford Boat Race Mutiny. The book tells the story of the 1987 Boat Race and the disagreement amongst the Oxford crew known as the "Oxford mutiny". It was made into a 1996 film. In 1994 he won a Travelex Radio Award for the BBC series Topolski’s Travels. In 2013 he was made an honorary fellow of New College, Oxford.

== Personal life ==
Topolski was married to actress Susan Gilmore and had three children: Emma, Luke, and Tamsin, an actress.

Topolski died on 21 February 2015 following a lengthy period of ill health. Five-time Olympic gold medallist Steve Redgrave said: "Rowing will miss him dearly and so will I."

Awards and achievements
Preceded by No award	William Hill Sports Book of the Year winner 1989	Succeeded by Paul Kimmage
