= True Blue (1996 film) =

- Directed by: Ferdinand Fairfax
- Written by: Rupert Walters; Daniel Topolski; Patrick Robinson
- Produced by: Allan Scott
- Starring: Dominic West; Josh Lucas; Johan Leysen; Geraldine Somerville; Nicholas Rowe; Bill Nighy
- Production companies: Booker Entertainment; Channel Four Films; Film and General Productions; Rafford Films
- Distributed by: FilmFour Productions
- Release dates: November 12, 1996 (Premiere); November 15, 1996 (London)
- Running time: 110 minutes
- Country: United Kingdom
- Language: English
- Budget: £3.5 million

True Blue is a 1996 British sport drama film, based on the 1989 book True Blue: The Oxford Boat Race Mutiny by Daniel Topolski and Patrick Robinson. It follows the 1987 Oxford-Cambridge Boat Race and the disagreement amongst the Oxford team known as the "Oxford mutiny". For the US DVD release by Miramax, the film was retitled Miracle at Oxford.

== Plot ==
True Blue is a film adaptation of Topolski's book of the same name. Although names and events were changed, it tells the story of the 1987 Oxford Cambridge Boat Race, from the perspective of Topolski and Macdonald. Directed by Ferdinand Fairfax, this low-budget film was made by Film4 Productions, starring Dominic West, and Josh Lucas.

The film opens with a fancied Oxford crew losing by 'almost seven lengths' to Cambridge. Macdonald and Ross (a sobriquet for the real life Chris Clark) are seen in the losing crew. The crew's various reactions are shown, and later Ross pledges to bring some American oarsman over to get one of the famous Oxford Blades.

The film cuts to the next year, when the recent world champion Daniel Warren (Dan Lyons) arrives in Oxford with some other Americans. Not all are happy about the new arrivals, however, and are concerned for their seats in the boats. We then see a montage of training sequences before the Fours Head of the River Race, for which the top boat is changed at the last minute at the instigation of Warren, prompting fury from the ejected crew member. The crew goes on to finish 28th, a very unimpressive placing for a Varsity squad boat.

Topolski is then shown berating the squad, and the other coaches share concerns about the form of the athletes, particularly Ross. Topolski decides to look at the results of the Trial Eights race, which initially looks good, but is marred by a clash of blades.

The Americans later rebel against the coaches and say they will walk out if Ross is not selected. In the end none of the Americans row and Topolski goes with a less experienced crew. After initial tensions the crew comes together and trains well for the last few weeks before the race. On race day the crew wins by around four lengths.

== Release ==
The film was selected as the Royal Film Performance, with the premiere on 12 November 1996. The film was not well received critically. It opened at the Odeon Leicester Square in London on 15 November 1996 grossing £14,166 in its opening weekend, the highest per-screen average that weekend. It expanded to 108 screens a week later but only grossed £63,645, finishing in tenth place nationally and continued to perform poorly at the box office.
