= Nimitz Class (novel) =

1997 novel by Patrick Robinson

- First edition cover
- Author: Patrick Robinson
- Publisher: HarperCollins
- Publication date: June 1, 1997
- ISBN: 0-06-018755-7

Nimitz Class is a naval thriller published in 1997 by British novelist Patrick Robinson. It is the first book in the series which features admiral Arnold Morgan and Ben Adnam. It is stylistically similar to Tom Clancy, particularly The Hunt for Red October.

== Plot summary ==
In May 2002, a nuclear torpedo attack occurs on the Nimitz-class aircraft carrier USS Thomas Jefferson, destroying it. A search commences for the attacking submarine, a Cold War-era Kilo-class submarine. The hunt for the Kilo results in the sinking of the Ayatollah of Iran's submarines by a Navy SEAL raid, an underwater transit through the Bosporus, and an underwater battle near the Falklands. Commander Ben Adnam is a slick commander who eludes capture. He skillfully evades Bill Baldrige and the U.S. Navy.

== Film adaptation ==
In early 1997, John McTiernan optioned the rights to the techno-thriller Nimitz Class for Universal soon after the novel's publication. McTiernan intended to direct the film through his then-wife/producer Donna DuBrow, who refused to allow it to be made following their separation.

== See also ==
- State-sponsored terrorism
