= Patrick Robinson (author) =

British novelist and newspaper columnist

- Born: 21 January 1940 (age 86)
- Website: www.patrickrobinson.com Archived

Patrick Robinson (born 21 January 1940) is a British novelist and newspaper columnist.

His recent books are naval-based thrillers, each telling the story of a crisis facing the world in the early 21st century. His earlier works include four nonfiction books about thoroughbred horses; True Blue: The Oxford Boat Race Mutiny, the story of the 1987 Oxford Boat Race mutiny (for which he, and co-author Dan Topolski won the inaugural William Hill Sports Book of the Year in 1989); and One Hundred Days, the biography of Admiral Sir Sandy Woodward.

He has a home on Cape Cod.

== Bibliography ==
=== Fiction ===
Stand-alone Novels

- Slider (2002)

Admiral Arnold Morgan

1. Nimitz Class (1997)
2. Kilo Class (1998)
3. H.M.S. Unseen (1999)
4. U.S.S. Seawolf (2000)
5. The Shark Mutiny (2001)
6. Barracuda 945 (2003)
7. Scimitar SL-2 (2004)
8. Hunter Killer (2005)
9. Ghost Force (2006)
10. To the Death (2008)

Navy Seal Lt. Commander Mack Bedford

1. Diamondhead (2009)
2. Intercept (2010)
3. The Delta Solution (2011)
4. Power Play (2012)

=== Non-fiction ===
- Classic Lines
- The Golden Post
- Decade of Champions
- Born to Win (John Bertrand and Patrick Robinson) (1985)
- True Blue: The Oxford Boat Race Mutiny (Daniel Topolski with Patrick Robinson) (1989)
- One Hundred Days (Sandy Woodward and Patrick Robinson) (1992)
- Horsetrader (with Nick Robinson) (1993)
- Lone Survivor: The Eyewitness Account of Operation Redwing and the Lost Heroes of SEAL Team 10 – Marcus Luttrell with Patrick Robinson (2007)
- A Colossal Failure of Common Sense: The Inside Story of the Collapse of Lehman Brothers – Lawrence G. McDonald with Patrick Robinson (2009)
- Topgun on Wall Street (Jeffery Lay with Patrick Robinson) (2013)
- Honor and Betrayal (2013)
- The Lion of Sabray (2015)

| Preceded by No award | William Hill Sports Book of the Year winner 1989 | Succeeded by Paul Kimmage |
