= London Film Critics Circle Awards 2017 =

British film awards ceremony

38th London Film Critics' Circle Awards

28 January 2018

Film of the Year:
Three Billboards Outside Ebbing, Missouri

British/Irish Film of the Year:
Dunkirk

The 38th London Film Critics' Circle Awards, honouring the best in film for 2017, were announced by the London Film Critics' Circle on 28 January 2018 at The May Fair Hotel, in Mayfair, London. The nominations were announced on 19 December 2017. Actor-filmmakers Alice Lowe and Steve Oram returned to host the ceremony for the third consecutive year.

== Winners and nominees ==
=== Film of the Year ===
Three Billboards Outside Ebbing, Missouri

- Call Me by Your Name
- Dunkirk
- The Florida Project
- Get Out
- God's Own Country
- Lady Bird
- Loveless
- Phantom Thread
- The Shape of Water

=== Foreign Language Film of the Year ===
Elle

- Aquarius
- The Handmaiden
- Loveless
- Raw

=== British/Irish Film of the Year ===
Dunkirk

- God's Own Country
- Lady Macbeth
- Paddington 2
- Three Billboards Outside Ebbing, Missouri

=== Documentary of the Year ===
I Am Not Your Negro

- 78/52
- Human Flow
- Jane
- The Work

=== Actor of the Year ===
Timothée Chalamet – Call Me by Your Name

- Daniel Day-Lewis – Phantom Thread
- James Franco – The Disaster Artist
- Daniel Kaluuya – Get Out
- Gary Oldman – Darkest Hour

=== Actress of the Year ===
Frances McDormand – Three Billboards Outside Ebbing, Missouri

- Annette Bening – Film Stars Don't Die in Liverpool
- Sally Hawkins – The Shape of Water
- Isabelle Huppert – Elle
- Florence Pugh – Lady Macbeth

=== Supporting Actor of the Year ===
Hugh Grant – Paddington 2

- Willem Dafoe –The Florida Project
- Woody Harrelson – Three Billboards Outside Ebbing, Missouri
- Sam Rockwell – Three Billboards Outside Ebbing, Missouri
- Michael Stuhlbarg – Call Me by Your Name

=== Supporting Actress of the Year ===
Lesley Manville – Phantom Thread

- Lily Gladstone – Certain Women
- Holly Hunter – The Big Sick
- Allison Janney – I, Tonya
- Laurie Metcalf – Lady Bird

=== British/Irish Actor of the Year ===
Daniel Kaluuya – Get Out

- Daniel Day-Lewis – Phantom Thread
- Colin Farrell – The Beguiled / The Killing of a Sacred Deer
- Josh O'Connor – God's Own Country
- Gary Oldman – Darkest Hour / The Space Between Us

=== British/Irish Actress of the Year ===
Sally Hawkins – The Shape of Water / Maudie / Paddington 2

- Emily Beecham – Daphne
- Judi Dench – Victoria & Abdul / Murder on the Orient Express
- Florence Pugh – Lady Macbeth
- Saoirse Ronan – Lady Bird / Loving Vincent

=== Young British/Irish Performer of the Year ===
Harris Dickinson – Beach Rats

- Tom Holland – The Lost City of Z / Spider-Man: Homecoming
- Noah Jupe – Suburbicon / Wonder / The Man with the Iron Heart
- Dafne Keen – Logan
- Fionn Whitehead – Dunkirk

=== Director of the Year ===
Sean Baker – The Florida Project

- Guillermo del Toro – The Shape of Water
- Luca Guadagnino – Call Me by Your Name
- Martin McDonagh – Three Billboards Outside Ebbing, Missouri
- Christopher Nolan – Dunkirk

=== Screenwriter of the Year ===
Martin McDonagh – Three Billboards Outside Ebbing, Missouri

- Paul Thomas Anderson – Phantom Thread
- Greta Gerwig – Lady Bird
- James Ivory – Call Me by Your Name
- Jordan Peele – Get Out

=== Breakthrough British/Irish Filmmaker ===
Francis Lee – God's Own Country

- Alice Birch – Lady Macbeth
- Simon Farnaby – Paddington 2 / Mindhorn
- Rungano Nyoni – I Am Not a Witch
- William Oldroyd – Lady Macbeth

=== British/Irish Short Film ===
We Love Moses – Dionne Edwards

- The Cloud of Unknowing – Mike Hannon
- The Dog and the Elephant – Mike Sharpe
- Tuesday – Charlotte Wells
- Your Mother and I – Anna Maguire

=== Technical Achievement ===
Blade Runner 2049 – Dennis Gassner, production design

- Baby Driver – Darrin Prescott, stunts
- Dunkirk – Hans Zimmer, music
- God's Own Country – Joshua James Richards, cinematography
- Lady Macbeth – Holly Waddington, costumes
- The Lost City of Z – Darius Khondji, cinematography
- The Love Witch – Emma Willis, hair & makeup
- Paddington 2 – Pablo Grillo, visual effects
- Phantom Thread – Mark Bridges, costumes
- Star Wars: The Last Jedi – Ben Morris, visual effects

=== Dilys Powell Award ===
- Kate Winslet
