= British Independent Film Awards 2017 =

British film awards ceremony

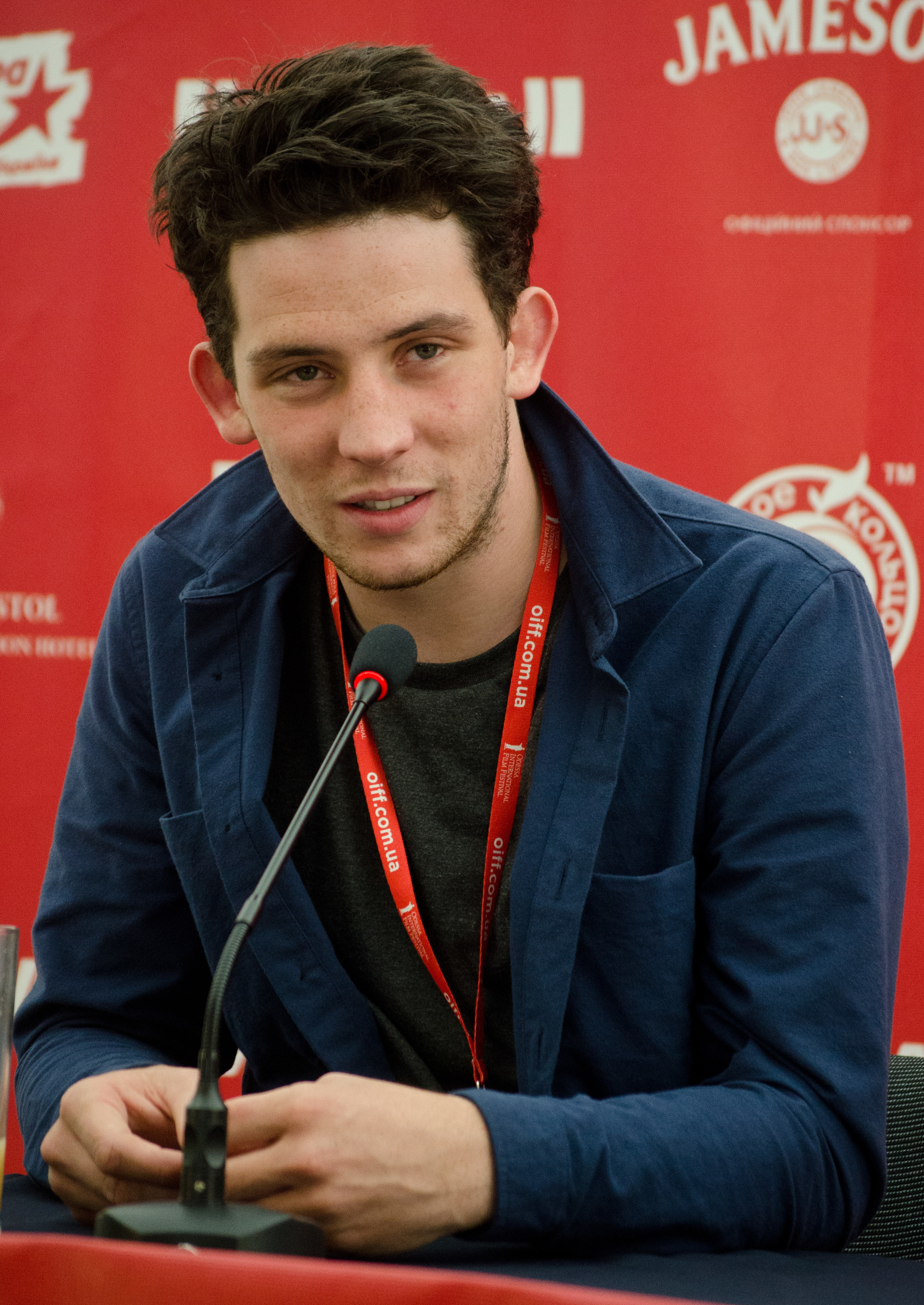
British actor Josh O'Connor at the 6th Odessa International Film Festival.

The 20th British Independent Film Awards nominations were announced on 1 November 2017.

== Awards and nominations ==
=== Best British Independent Film ===
- God's Own Country
- The Death of Stalin
- I Am Not a Witch
- Lady Macbeth
- Three Billboards Outside Ebbing, Missouri

=== Best Director ===
- Rungano Nyoni - I Am Not a Witch
- Armando Iannucci - The Death of Stalin
- Francis Lee - God's Own Country
- Martin McDonagh - Three Billboards Outside Ebbing, Missouri
- William Oldroyd - Lady Macbeth

=== Best Actress ===
- Florence Pugh - Lady Macbeth
- Emily Beecham - Daphne
- Frances McDormand - Three Billboards Outside Ebbing, Missouri
- Margaret Mulubwa - I Am Not a Witch
- Ruth Wilson - Dark River

=== Best Actor ===
- Josh O'Connor - God's Own Country
- Jamie Bell - Film Stars Don't Die in Liverpool
- Paddy Considine - Journeyman
- Johnny Harris - Jawbone
- Alec Secareanu - God's Own Country

=== Best Supporting Actress ===
- Patricia Clarkson - The Party
- Naomi Ackie - Lady Macbeth
- Kelly Macdonald - Goodbye Christopher Robin
- Andrea Riseborough - The Death of Stalin
- Julie Walters - Film Stars Don't Die in Liverpool

=== Best Supporting Actor ===
- Simon Russell Beale - The Death of Stalin
- Steve Buscemi - The Death of Stalin
- Woody Harrelson - Three Billboards Outside Ebbing, Missouri
- Ian Hart - God's Own Country
- Sam Rockwell - Three Billboards Outside Ebbing, Missouri

=== Most Promising Newcomer ===
- Naomi Ackie - Lady Macbeth
- Harry Gilby - Just Charlie
- Cosmo Jarvis - Lady Macbeth
- Harry Michell - Chubby Funny
- Lily Newmark - Pin Cushion

=== The Douglas Hickox Award (Debut Director) ===
- Rungano Nyoni - I Am Not a Witch
- Deborah Haywood - Pin Cushion
- Francis Lee - God's Own Country
- Thomas Napper - Jawbone
- William Oldroyd - Lady Macbeth

=== Best Debut Screenwriter ===
- God's Own Country - Francis Lee
- I Am Not a Witch - Rungano Nyoni
- Jawbone - Johnny Harris
- Lady Macbeth - Alice Birch
- Their Finest - Gaby Chiappe

=== Breakthrough Producer ===
- I Am Not a Witch - Emily Morgan
- Bad Day for the Cut - Brendan Mullin and Katy Jackson
- God's Own Country - Jack Tarling and Manon Ardisson
- Lady Macbeth - Fodhla Cronin O'Reilly
- Pin Cushion - Gavin Humphries

=== Best Screenplay ===
- Lady Macbeth - Alice Birch
- The Death of Stalin - Armando Iannucci, David Schneider and Ian Martin
- God's Own Country - Francis Lee
- I Am Not a Witch - Rungano Nyoni
- Three Billboards Outside Ebbing, Missouri - Martin McDonagh

=== Best Documentary ===
- Almost Heaven
- Half Way
- Kingdom of Us
- Uncle Howard
- Williams

=== Best Foreign Independent Film ===
- Get Out
- The Florida Project
- I Am Not Your Negro
- Loveless
- The Square

=== Discovery Award ===
- In Another Life
- Even When I Fall
- Halfway
- Isolani
- My Pure Land

=== Best Casting ===
- The Death of Stalin - Sarah Crowe
- Film Stars Don't Die in Liverpool - Debbie McWilliams
- God's Own Country - Shaheen Baig and Layla Merrick-Wolf
- Lady Macbeth - Shaheen Baig
- Three Billboards Outside Ebbing, Missouri - Sarah Halley Finn

=== Best Cinematography ===
- Lady Macbeth - Ari Wegner
- I Am Not a Witch - David Gallego
- Jawbone - Tat Radcliffe
- Leaning Into the Wind - Thomas Riedelsheimer
- Three Billboards Outside Ebbing, Missouri - Ben Davis

=== Best Costume Design ===
- Lady Macbeth - Holly Waddington
- The Death of Stalin - Suzie Harman
- How to Talk to Girls at Parties - Sandy Powell
- I Am Not a Witch - Holly Rebecca
- My Cousin Rachel - Dinah Collin

=== Best Editing ===
- Three Billboards Outside Ebbing, Missouri - Jon Gregory
- The Death of Stalin - Peter Lambert
- Jawbone - David Charap
- Us and Them - Joe Martin
- Williams - Johnny Burke

=== Best Make-up and Hair Design ===
- The Death of Stalin - Nicole Stafford
- Breathe - Jan Sewell
- I Am Not a Witch - Julene Paton
- Journeyman - Nadia Stacey
- Lady Macbeth - Sian Wilson

=== Best Music ===
- Three Billboards Outside Ebbing, Missouri - Carter Burwell
- The Death of Stalin - Christopher Willis
- I Am Not a Witch - Matt Kelly
- Jawbone - Paul Weller
- Leaning Into the Wind - Fred Frith

=== Best Production Design ===
- The Death of Stalin - Cristina Casali
- Film Stars Don't Die in Liverpool - Eve Stewart
- Final Portrait - James Merifield
- I Am Not a Witch - Nathan Parker
- Lady Macbeth - Jacqueline Abrahams

=== Best Sound ===
- God's Own Country - Anna Bertmark
- Breathe - Sound team
- I Am Not a Witch - Maiken Hansen
- Jawbone - Andy Shelley and Steve Griffiths
- Three Billboards Outside Ebbing, Missouri - Joakim Sundström

=== Best Effects ===
- The Ritual - Nick Allder and Ben White
- The Death of Stalin - Effects team
- Double Date - Dan Martin
- Journeyman - Luke Dodd
- Their Finest - Chris Reynolds
