= Ari Wegner =

Australian cinematographer (born 1984)

- Born: 3 May 1984 (age 42); Melbourne, Australia
- Occupation: Cinematographer
- Years active: 2003–present

Ari Wegner, ACS, ASC, (born 3 May 1984) is an Australian cinematographer. Her work includes films such as Lady Macbeth (2016), True History of the Kelly Gang (2019), and Zola (2020). In 2021, she served as cinematographer on The Power of the Dog for which she received widespread critical acclaim including an Academy Award nomination for Best Cinematography, becoming only the second woman to do so in the award's 94-year history.

== Career ==
Wegner studied film at the Victorian College of the Arts, later working as a cinematographer in several short films and commercials. In 2016, she worked in the thriller drama series The Kettering Incident, receiving a nomination for Best Cinematography in Television at the 6th AACTA Awards. The same year, she was the director of photography in William Oldroyd's debut film Lady Macbeth, based on the novella Lady Macbeth of the Mtsensk District. For the film, she won the British Independent Film Award for Best Cinematography.

In 2017, she worked on the drama serial Guerrilla and the second season of the anthology series The Girlfriend Experience. In 2018, she worked on the horror comedy In Fabric, receiving a second nomination for the British Independent Film Awards. In 2020, she worked on the black comedy Zola, for which she was nominated for Best Cinematography at the 37th Independent Spirit Awards.

In 2021, she worked in Jane Campion's western drama The Power of the Dog, the film received critical acclaim and Wegner has received several awards and nominations for her work as a cinematographer.

She was the recipient of the Variety Artisan Award at the 2021 Toronto International Film Festival's TIFF Tribute Awards ceremony.

== Filmography ==
Key
†	Denotes films that have not yet been released

=== Film ===
Year	Title	Director	Notes
2011	Grey Matter	Kivu Ruhorahoza	
2013	Ruin	Michael Cody; Amiel Courtin-Wilson	
2016	Lady Macbeth	William Oldroyd	
2018	Stray	Dustin Feneley	
2018	In Fabric	Peter Strickland	
2019	True History of the Kelly Gang	Justin Kurzel	
2020	Zola	Janicza Bravo	
2021	The Power of the Dog	Jane Campion	
2022	The Wonder	Sebastián Lelio	
2023	Eileen	William Oldroyd	
2024	Drive-Away Dolls	Ethan Coen	
2025	Honey Don't!	Ethan Coen	

=== Television ===
Year	Title	Director	Notes
2016	The Kettering Incident	Rowan Woods; Tony Krawitz	Miniseries
2017	Guerrilla	John Ridley	"Episode 6"
2017	The Girlfriend Experience	Amy Seimetz; Lodge Kerrigan	9 episodes
2025	Little House on the Prairie	Sarah Adina Smith	

== Awards and nominations ==
Year	Award	Category	Work	Result	Ref.
2016	AACTA Awards	Best Cinematography in Television	The Kettering Incident	Nominated	
2017	British Independent Film Awards	Best Cinematography	Lady Macbeth	Won	
2018	Golden Eye	Grand Prize	Stray	Won	
2018	Golden Eye	Best Cinematography	Stray	Won	
2019	British Independent Film Awards	Best Cinematography	In Fabric	Nominated	
2021	Independent Spirit Awards	Best Cinematography	Zola	Nominated	
2021	Academy Awards	Best Cinematography	The Power of the Dog	Nominated	
2021	Alliance of Women Film Journalists Awards	Best Cinematography	The Power of the Dog	Won	
2021	American Society of Cinematographers Awards	Best Cinematography	The Power of the Dog	Nominated	
2021	Austin Film Critics Association Awards	Best Cinematography	The Power of the Dog	Nominated	
2021	Boston Society of Film Critics Awards	Best Cinematography	The Power of the Dog	Won	
2021	Chicago Film Critics Association Awards	Best Cinematography	The Power of the Dog	Won	
2021	Critics' Choice Awards	Best Cinematography	The Power of the Dog	Won	
2021	Dallas–Fort Worth Film Critics Association Awards	Best Cinematography	The Power of the Dog	2nd Place	
2021	Florida Film Critics Circle Awards	Best Cinematography	The Power of the Dog	Won	
2021	Hollywood Critics Association Awards	Best Cinematography	The Power of the Dog	Nominated	
2021	Houston Film Critics Society Awards	Best Cinematography	The Power of the Dog	Nominated	
2021	Los Angeles Film Critics Association Awards	Best Cinematography	The Power of the Dog	Won	
2021	New York Film Critics Online	Best Cinematography	The Power of the Dog	Won	
2021	Satellite Awards	Best Cinematography	The Power of the Dog	Nominated	
2021	St. Louis Gateway Film Critics Association Awards	Best Cinematography	The Power of the Dog	Won	
2021	Washington D.C. Area Film Critics Association Awards	Best Cinematography	The Power of the Dog	Nominated	
