= Tarradale Castle =

Castle near Muir of Ord, Scotland

Tarradale Castle was a castle that was located near Muir of Ord, Scotland, most likely northwest of Tarradale House. King Robert the Bruce captured and destroyed the castle in 1308.

In 2017, the University of Aberdeen undertook an extensive survey and trench evaluation of the site. Evidence of medieval settlement, including ceramics and worked metals were discovered. The earthworks of the castle have been flattened and ploughed out.

== Tarradale House ==
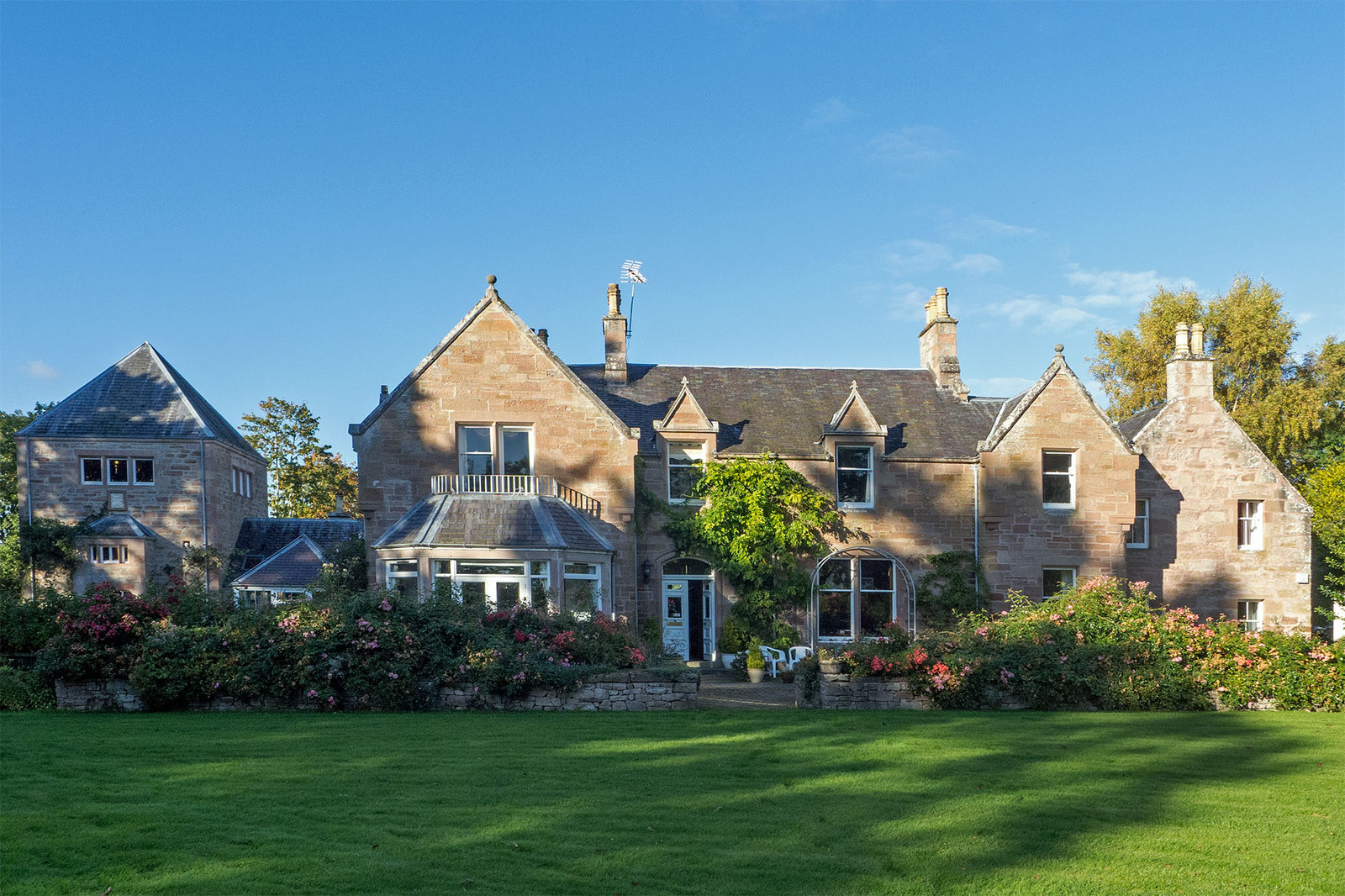
Tarradale House

Tarradale House was built on the site in 1680. The geologist Sir Roderick Murchison was born there in 1792.
