= Charlotte Murchison =

British geologist (1788–1869)

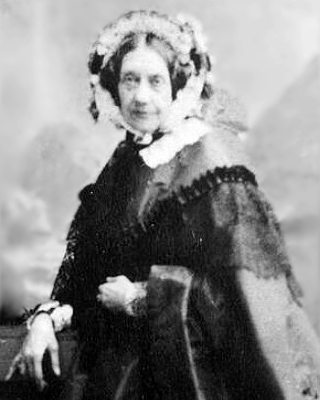
- Charlotte Murchison in 1860
- Born: Charlotte Hugonin; 18 April 1788; Nursted House, near Petersfield, Hampshire, England
- Died: 9 February 1869 (aged 80); Belgravia, London, England
- Spouse: Sir Roderick Murchison, 1st Baronet (m. 1815)
- Scientific career
- Fields: Geology

Charlotte, Lady Murchison (née Hugonin; 18 April 1788 – 9 February 1869) was a British geologist born in Hampshire, England. She was married to the nineteenth-century geologist Roderick Impey Murchison.

Several times during her life, the couple travelled throughout continental Europe, visiting places such as France, the Alps, and Italy. She also created numerous sketches of geological features, such as cliffs and fossils, in England during their numerous excursions throughout the country, including the Yorkshire coast in 1826.

Charlotte built a significant collection of fossils during the Murchisons’ travels, as well as studying and drawing as a lifelong pursuit. Applying what she had been taught by the painter Paul Sandby, she created geological sketches of important features. With many of her sketches, she often did not focus on the geological features in detail, but instead created a more emotive illustration of the landscape.

Through her work, she also helped her husband to develop many of his publications. Many of her illustrations, such as "Valley of Gosau", were incorporated into works her husband published. Charlotte is also often credited with being a significant influence on her husband’s career. On one of the trips she took with her husband, she contracted malaria and suffered complications for the rest of her life, until succumbing to the disease at the age of 80.

Charlotte Murchison died on 9 February 1869 at Belgrave Square, London. She was buried at Brompton Cemetery in London.

== Personal life ==
Charlotte was a daughter of General Francis Hugonin (1750–1836), whom she later described as highly intelligent, and his wife Charlotte Edgar (died 1838), who was a talented florist and botanist, according to her daughter. At the age of 27, she met Roderick Impey Murchison, a soldier, and they married later that year, on 29 August 1815.

In 1816, the young couple went on a tour of France, the Alps, and Italy, where Charlotte closely observed the various distinctive forms of plant life found among rock formations in the areas they visited. After spending the winter in Genoa, they travelled to Rome and stayed into the summer, where Charlotte fell ill and nearly died of a malarial fever. Although she recovered, the effects of the illness persisted throughout her life.

While in Rome, the Murchisons became lifelong friends with Mary Somerville (1780–1872), who would later write of them in her autobiography, describing Charlotte as "an amiable accomplished woman, [who] drew prettily and – what was rare at the time – she had studied science, especially geology, and it was chiefly owing to her example that her husband turned his mind to those pursuits in which he afterwards obtained such distinction."

Following their trip to Europe, the Murchisons moved to Barnard Castle, County Durham. During their time here, Charlotte continued her collecting and studying of minerals, although her husband had settled into a life apart from geology. After spending years at her pursuits, Charlotte – along with Sir Humphry Davy – convinced Roderick to continue his study of geology. In 1824, the couple moved to London in order for Roderick to attend lectures on the subject.

With her husband now focused on the study of geology, Charlotte became Roderick’s constant companion during his travels, studies, and fieldwork, working alongside him. On one such trip, specifically their voyage to the southern coast of England, Charlotte went fossil-hunting with Mary Anning (1799–1847) and the two became close friends from then on.

Throughout travels with her husband, Charlotte would purchase or hunt for fossils to add to her personal collection, oftentimes studying them independently as well. Charlotte's collection was so well-kept and educational that specimens of her collection were studied by and published in the works of James de Carle Sowerby (1788–1871) and, later, William Buckland (1784–1856). In recognition of Charlotte's contributions, Sowerby named an ammonite fossil, Ammonites murchisonae, sketched by her on one of her trips to Yorkshire, after her.

Despite all her self-study and time working in the field alongside her husband, Charlotte desired higher education. By 1831, Charles Lyell (1797–1875), a friend of the Murchisons with whom they had worked and travelled, was giving geological lectures at King's College, London. Despite his refusal to admit women to his lectures, Charlotte persisted in her attendance, leading to Lyell's opening of his lectures to both men and women. Charlotte would also attend the meetings of the British Association for the Advancement of Science when able, despite her continued health issues.

In 1838, when her mother died, Charlotte was left a substantial fortune, and the couple was able to move to a prestigious house in Belgravia, London. Their soirées became a popular meeting place for scientists and politicians, and it was noted that much of the success of these parties was due to Charlotte's attendance.

Eventually, after years of struggling with illness, she became too debilitated to travel with her husband, eventually dying of her chronic health issues.

== Travels through Continental Europe ==
=== Travels with Roderick from 1816 to 1818 ===
During her lifetime, Charlotte accompanied her husband on several trips across Continental Europe. The first was in the spring of 1816 and included visits to locations in France and Italy, as well as a trip to the Alps. Among the cities they visited was Genoa, during the winter of 1816, and Rome, in the following spring. The objective of this trip was not specifically for geological pursuits, although that is not to say that no geological activities took place. Primarily, the couple engaged in other activities, including learning Italian and visiting prominent cultural cities.

This trip is notable as it was then, while in Rome, that Charlotte caught malaria, an illness which would affect her health throughout her life. Prior to this trip, the Murchisons had had little experience in geological work, as noted in Mary Somerville's account of the couple. After spending the summer of 1818 in Italy, the couple returned to England.

=== Travels with Roderick and Charles Lyell in 1828 ===
The next notable trip the couple took to Continental Europe would begin in April 1828. On 7 May, they would be joined by Charles Lyell in Paris and from there they would begin their tour of Europe together. For this trip, they began in France and traveled through the Massif Central, stopping in Nizza before continuing on to Southern Germany. Eventually, the group would make their way to the Austrian and Tyrolese Alps.

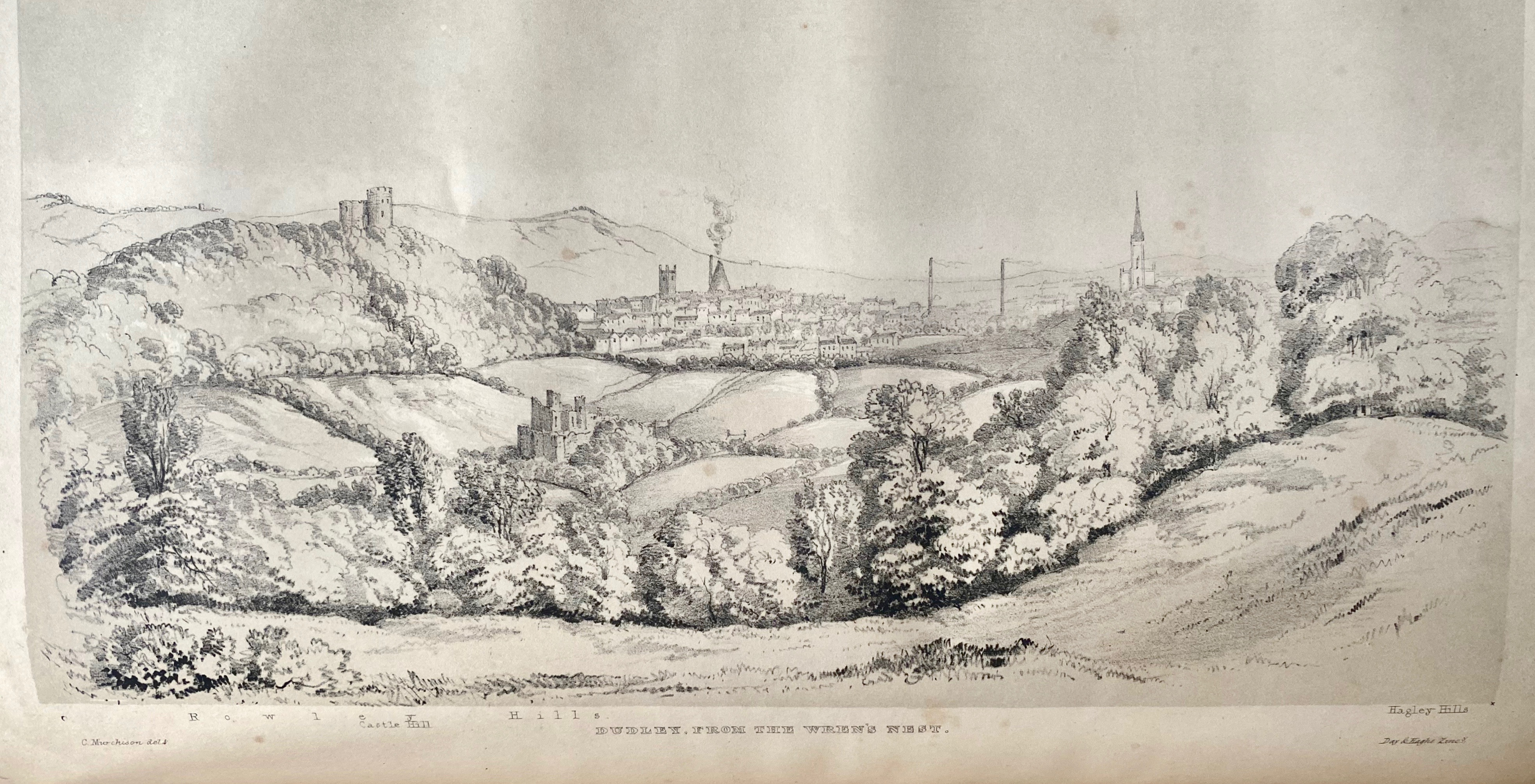
Lithographic Sketch, Dudley from Wren's Nest, by Murchison from her husband's book The Silurian System, 1839

Sketch of Dudley from the Wren's Nest dawn by Charlottte, wife of Roderick Impey Murchison in his magnum opus, The Silurian System,

Still being relatively new to the study of Geology, the group primarily saw this trip as an opportunity to further their knowledge in the field. One of the first stops of geological significance occurred after they had climbed the Puy de Dome, on 18 May, and returned to Clermont-Ferrand where they had been staying. In Clermont-Ferrand, Charles Lyell and Roderick Murchison would frequently go on excursions out of the city and leave Charlotte behind. While they were away Charlotte worked on creating panoramas of the region, interacting with local experts, and collecting various plants and shells from the region. Much of the work Charlotte did during this time was incorporated into the work of her companions.

After leaving Clermont-Ferrand, the group traveled to Mont Dore on 5 June, and then later on to Aurillac on 18 June. Here, Charlotte developed even more illustrations with a focus on lacustrine limestones. The group continued on until they eventually reached Fréjus. While there, Roderick developed a high fever but Charlotte was able to nurse him back to health. She too was also feeling unwell, and the group stopped at Nice for a significant period of time. Once Roderick had recovered, they continued on toward Turin and Padua. At this point, though, the group split as Charles Lyell continued further south. Charlotte and Roderick Murchison, meanwhile, headed back across the Alps in order to return to England as they had received word that Charlotte's parents were ill. They continued quickly back to England until in Tyrol they were notified of her parents’ recovery and slowed their return to England, spending more time in Germany.

=== Later travels ===
In later years, Roderick would undertake more trips to Europe, including a trip to Russia, but Charlotte would be unable to accompany her husband due to recurrences of the illness she contracted during their first trip to Continental Europe. The couple did, however, manage to make another trip in 1847 to the Alps and Italy in hopes it would help Charlotte's condition as well as to perform some scientific work.

== Depictions in media ==
Murchison is portrayed by Irish actress Saoirse Ronan in the romantic drama film Ammonite (2020). The film depicts her in a speculative romantic relationship with Mary Anning.

== Lecture theatre named for Murchison ==
On International Women's Day 2023, the University of Edinburgh renamed a lecture theatre at its King's Buildings campus after Charlotte in recognition of her contribution to earth sciences.
