= God's Own Country (2017 film) =

2017 film by Francis Lee

- Theatrical release poster
- Directed by: Francis Lee
- Written by: Francis Lee
- Produced by: Manon Ardisson; Jack Tarling
- Starring: Josh O'Connor; Alec Secăreanu; Gemma Jones; Ian Hart
- Cinematography: Joshua James Richards
- Edited by: Chris Wyatt
- Music by: A Winged Victory for the Sullen
- Production companies: BFI; Creative England; Met Film; Shudder Films; Inflammable Films; Magic Bear Productions
- Distributed by: Picturehouse Entertainment
- Release dates: 23 January 2017 (Sundance); 1 September 2017 (United Kingdom)
- Running time: 105 minutes
- Country: United Kingdom
- Language: English
- Budget: £1 million
- Box office: $2.6 million

God's Own Country is a 2017 British romantic drama film written and directed by Francis Lee in his feature directorial debut. The film stars Josh O'Connor and Alec Secăreanu. The plot follows a young sheep farmer in Yorkshire whose life is transformed by a Romanian migrant worker.

Upon release, the film received widespread acclaim from critics, who praised the performances (particularly O'Connor's) and story, as well as commending it as a promising start for Lee. It was the only UK-based production to feature in the world drama category at the 2017 Sundance Film Festival, where it won the world cinema directing award.

== Plot ==
In Yorkshire, Johnny lives on the family farm with his father, Martin, and grandmother, Deirdre. Because his father had suffered a stroke and because of his grandmother's age, much of the day-to-day running of the farm falls to Johnny. In his free time, Johnny engages in binge drinking and furtive sexual encounters with other men. Returning late to the farm after such an encounter with a young auctioneer, he is berated by his father because a calf has nearly died from a breech birth in his absence. Johnny proposes to call a veterinarian, but Martin has him shoot the still alive calf instead.

Gheorghe, a Romanian migrant worker, is hired as extra help for the lambing season. He arrives and spends his first night in a caravan that the family has organised as his accommodation. As the ewes have moved away from the main part of the farm, and as part of the farm's boundary wall remains unrepaired by Johnny, it is decided that Johnny and Gheorghe should spend several days camping nearer to the animals.

Gheorghe quietly disapproves of the old-fashioned way the farm is run, without proper veterinary care or even antiseptics for wounded or sick animals. When one of the ewes gives birth to an unconscious runt, Johnny, following on his father's way of running the farm, is about to let it die, but is intrigued when Gheorghe is able to resuscitate and care for it instead. One morning, after Johnny refers to Gheorghe yet again as a "gypsy", Gheorghe tackles him to the ground and warns Johnny not to speak that way to him again.

The next day, the two men again engage in a fight which results in Johnny performing fellatio on Gheorghe and the two men have rough and passionate sex in the dirt. While Johnny initially does not acknowledge the encounter, the two share cigarettes and a sugar packet for their cup noodles throughout the day. That night, Gheorghe resists Johnny's aggressive move to have sex, instead patiently showing him that sex can also be tender, and the two men kiss for the first time.

Returning to the farm, Johnny invites Gheorghe to stay with him in the house, but Gheorghe elects to remain in the caravan. When Martin suffers a second stroke, Johnny realises that running the farm is now entirely his responsibility, and he asks Gheorghe to stay on with him. Gheorghe responds that the experience has taught him they cannot maintain the farm the way it is currently run, stressing it would be a serious professional and personal commitment. Johnny reacts poorly, drinking to excess and engaging in another random sexual encounter. When Gheorghe realises what Johnny has done, he abruptly leaves the farm.

Martin is released from the hospital but is now fully debilitated. Johnny, desperate to make up with Gheorghe, tells his father that he will stay to run the farm, but that things must be run on his terms. Martin gives his tacit approval to Johnny, who sets off to bring Gheorghe back to the farm. After he finds Gheorghe working in Scotland, the two men reconcile. Gheorghe returns with Johnny; the caravan is taken away, and Gheorghe moves into the house.

== Cast ==
- Josh O'Connor as Johnny Saxby, a farmer living with his father and grandmother
- Alec Secăreanu as Gheorghe Ionescu, a Romanian migrant worker
- Gemma Jones as Deirdre Saxby, Johnny's grandmother and Martin's mother
- Ian Hart as Martin Saxby, John's father and Deirdre's son
- Harry Lister Smith as a trainee auctioneer
- Melanie Kilburn as Gloria
- Liam Thomas, as Glen
- Patsy Ferran as Robyn
- Moey Hassan as a taxi driver
- Naveed Choudhry as a nurse
- Sarah White as Joy
- John McCrea as a university boy
- Alexander Suvandjiev as a young farm worker
- Stefan Suvandjiev as a bearded farm worker

== Production ==
The film is partly based on writer and director Francis Lee's own life, where he also had to make a decision to either stay and work on his family's farm or go off to drama school.

The film was shot in Yorkshire, specifically around the Silsden area of Keighley in West Yorkshire, with some other scenes being shot in Keighley Bus Station and Airedale General Hospital with Haworth and Otley also featuring as backdrops for the film.

The production was financed in part through the British Film Council's iFeature programme with additional funding being secured from Creative England.

== Release ==
The film had its world premiere at the Sundance Film Festival on 23 January 2017. It was the only production from the United Kingdom that featured in the world drama category in the 2017 Sundance Film Festival. It went onto screen at the Berlin International Film Festival on 11 February 2017.

Shortly after, Picturehouse Entertainment, Orion Pictures and Samuel Goldwyn Films acquired UK and US distribution rights respectively. It was released in the United Kingdom on 1 September 2017. The film was banned in Malaysia, China and some Arab countries due to explicit sex scenes between the two men. Likewise, Romania was the only country in Eastern Europe where the film was screened.

God's Own Country was released on DVD on 30 January 2018.

== Reception ==
=== Box office ===
As of 8 March 2018, God's Own Country has grossed a worldwide total of $2.6 million, which includes $1.2 million in the United Kingdom.

=== Critical response ===
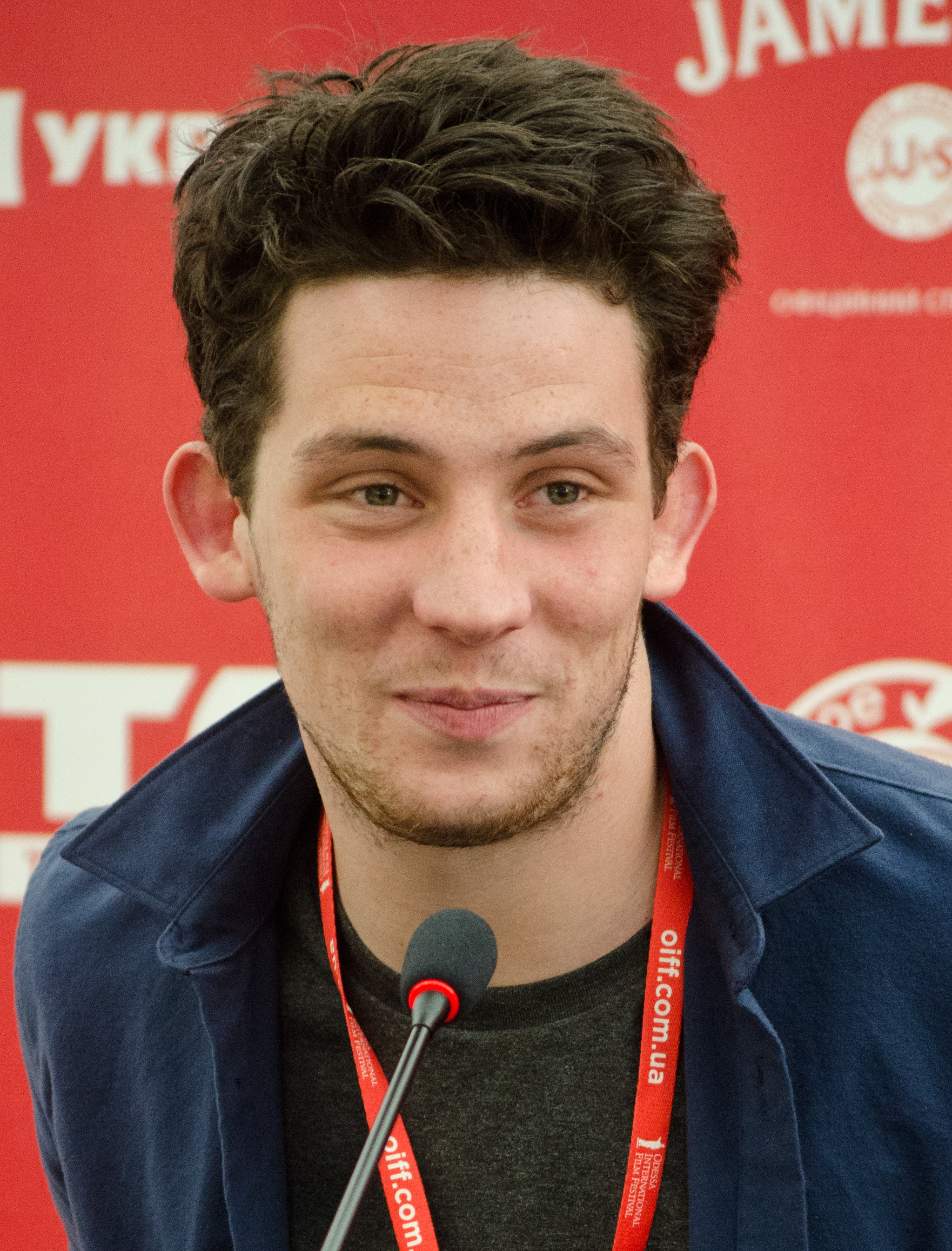
O'Connor's performance was praised by critics.

On the review aggregator website Rotten Tomatoes, 98% of 131 critics' reviews are positive. The website's consensus reads: "A quiet, moving rumination on loneliness and newfound intimacy, God's Own Country marks an outstanding directorial debut for Francis Lee." Metacritic, which uses a weighted average, assigned the film a score of 85 out of 100, based on 22 critics, indicating "universal acclaim".

The Sundance Film Festival's listing for God's Own Country says that "you can smell the mud in this movie" while also describing Francis Lee as a major new talent and the film as "one not to be missed." Peter Bradshaw, writing in The Guardian, gave the film four stars out of five. Bradshaw described the film as "an almost, but not quite a Dales Brokeback," and also as a "very British love story, bursting at the seams with unspoken emotions, unvoiced fears about the future, and a readiness to displace every emotion into hard physical work".

At the 2017 Berlin International Film Festival the film received the Harvey Award, presented by the Teddy Awards programme for LGBT-related films in conjunction with a reader jury from the German LGBT magazine Männer.

Ed Potton, writing in The Times, gave the film four stars out of five and described the film as "splendid" and "[a] potent film, a Yorkshire Brokeback Mountain".

=== Accolades ===
Award	Date of ceremony	Category	Recipient	Result	Ref.
Australian Film Critics Association	13 March 2018	Best International Film (English Language)	God's Own Country	Nominated	
Berlin International Film Festival	18 February 2017	Männer Jury Award	God's Own Country	Won	
Berlin International Film Festival	18 February 2017	Teddy Award	God's Own Country	Nominated	
British Academy Film Awards	18 February 2018	Outstanding British Film	God's Own Country	Nominated	
British Academy Film Awards	18 February 2018	Rising Star Award	Josh O'Connor	Nominated	
British Independent Film Awards	10 December 2017	Douglas Hickox Award	Francis Lee	Nominated	
British Independent Film Awards	10 December 2017	Best British Independent Film	God's Own Country	Won	
British Independent Film Awards	10 December 2017	Best Director	Francis Lee	Nominated	
British Independent Film Awards	10 December 2017	Best Screenplay	Francis Lee	Nominated	
British Independent Film Awards	10 December 2017	Best Actor	Josh O'Connor	Won	
British Independent Film Awards	10 December 2017	Best Actor	Alec Secăreanu	Nominated	
British Independent Film Awards	10 December 2017	Best Supporting Actor	Ian Hart	Nominated	
British Independent Film Awards	10 December 2017	Best Debut Screenwriter	Francis Lee	Won	
British Independent Film Awards	10 December 2017	Breakthrough Producer	Jack Tarling	Nominated	
British Independent Film Awards	10 December 2017	Breakthrough Producer	Manon Ardisson	Nominated	
British Independent Film Awards	10 December 2017	Best Casting	Shaheen Baig	Nominated	
British Independent Film Awards	10 December 2017	Best Casting	Layla Merrick-Wolf	Nominated	
British Independent Film Awards	10 December 2017	Best Sound	Anna Bertmark	Won	
Chicago International Film Festival	26 October 2017	Silver Q-Hugo	God's Own Country	Won	
Chéries-Chéris	21 November 2017	Grand Prize	God's Own Country	Nominated	
Dinard British Film Festival	1 October 2017	Golden Hitchcock	God's Own Country	Won	
Dinard British Film Festival	1 October 2017	Heartbeat Hitchcock	God's Own Country	Won	
Dorian Awards	31 January 2018	LGBTQ Film of the Year	God's Own Country	Nominated	
Dorian Awards	31 January 2018	Unsung Film of the Year	God's Own Country	Won	
Edinburgh International Film Festival	20 June 2017	The Michael Powell Award for Best British Feature Film	Francis Lee	Won	
Empire Awards	18 March 2018	Best British Film	God's Own Country	Won	
Empire Awards	18 March 2018	Best Male Newcomer	Josh O'Connor	Won	
Empire Awards	18 March 2018	Best Screenplay	Francis Lee	Nominated	
Evening Standard British Film Awards	8 February 2018	Best Film	God's Own Country	Won	
Evening Standard British Film Awards	8 February 2018	Best Supporting Actor	Ian Hart	Nominated	
Evening Standard British Film Awards	8 February 2018	Best Supporting Actress	Gemma Jones	Won	
Evening Standard British Film Awards	8 February 2018	Breakthrough of the Year	Francis Lee	Nominated	
Evening Standard British Film Awards	8 February 2018	Breakthrough of the Year	Josh O'Connor	Nominated	
Frameline San Francisco International LGBTQ Film Festival	27 June 2017	AT&T Audience Award	God's Own Country	Won	
Galway Film Fleadh	5 September 2017	Best International First Feature	God's Own Country	Won	
Honolulu Rainbow Film Festival	19 August 2017	Best Feature	God's Own Country	Won	
Jameson CineFest–Miskolc International Film Festival	17 September 2017	Emeric Pressburger Prize	God's Own Country	Nominated	
London Film Critics' Circle	28 January 2018	Film of the Year	God's Own Country	Nominated	
London Film Critics' Circle	28 January 2018	British/Irish Film of the Year	God's Own Country	Nominated	
London Film Critics' Circle	28 January 2018	British/Irish Actor of the Year	Josh O'Connor	Nominated	
London Film Critics' Circle	28 January 2018	Breakthrough British/Irish Filmmaker	Francis Lee	Won	
London Film Critics' Circle	28 January 2018	Technical Achievement Award	Joshua James Richards	Nominated	
San Francisco International Film Festival	19 April 2017	Golden Gate Award	God's Own Country	Nominated	
Satellite Awards	10 February 2018	Best Film	God's Own Country	Won (Note: Tied with Three Billboards Outside Ebbing, Missouri)	
Stockholm International Film Festival	20 November 2017	Best Direction	Francis Lee	Won	
Stockholm International Film Festival	20 November 2017	Best Male Actor	Josh O'Connor	Won	
Stockholm International Film Festival	20 November 2017	Bronze Horse	God's Own Country	Nominated	
Sundance Film Festival	28 January 2017	World Cinema Directing Award	Francis Lee	Won	
Sundance Film Festival	28 January 2017	Grand Jury Prize	Francis Lee	Nominated	
Sydney Film Festival	18 June 2017	Foxtel Movies Audience Award	God's Own Country	7th place	
Toronto Inside Out Lesbian and Gay Film and Video Festival	4 June 2017	Bill Sherwood Award	God's Own Country	Won	
Transilvania International Film Festival	11 June 2017	Special Jury Award	God's Own Country	Won	
Transilvania International Film Festival	11 June 2017	Transilvania Trophy	God's Own Country	Nominated	
Writers' Guild of Great Britain Awards	15 January 2018	Best First Screenplay	Francis Lee	Nominated	
Zagreb Film Festival	18 November 2017	The Golden Pram	God's Own Country	Nominated	
