= Holly Waddington =

British costume designer

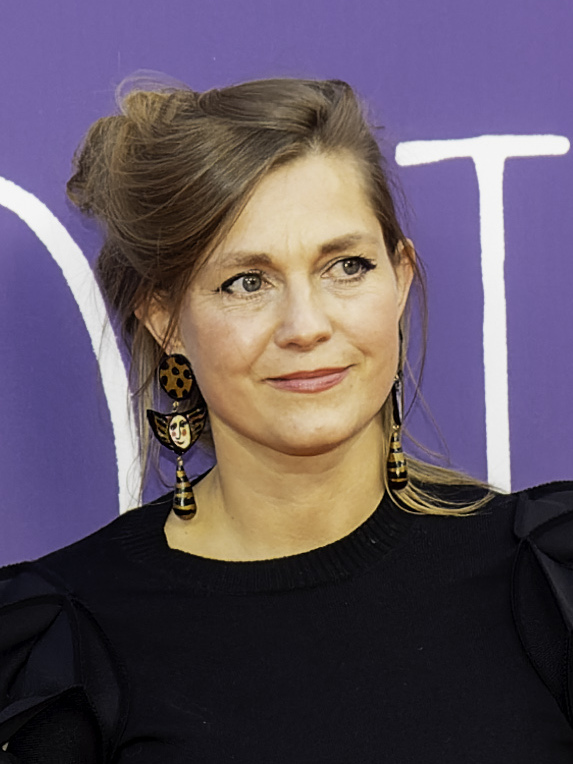
- Holly Waddington in 2023
- Education: Ruskin School of Art
- Occupation: Costume designer
- Years active: 2007–present

Holly Waddington is a British costume designer active since 2007. She has worked on many period drama films, often with a modern twist. She is best known for her work in the 2023 absurdist comedy film Poor Things, for which she received an Academy Award and a BAFTA Award. Waddington was hired to design the costumes for the upcoming HBO television series Harry Potter.

== Early life and education ==
Holly Waddington grew up in Burnley, Lancashire and would often visit vintage clothing shops with her mother. After moving to London, she trained at and worked for Angels Costume House as a ladies' period costume designer. Waddington has a degree in Fine Art from Oxford University's Ruskin School of Art. She pursued her passion for "imperfect" creative pursuits such as painting and drawing, but struggled to create clothing and so has preferred to focus on costume design and let others complete the task of crafting the materials.

== Career ==
Waddington has worked in the costume industry since 2007. In her early career, she served as an assistant designer in the Steven Spielberg films War Horse (2011) and Lincoln (2012). In recent years, her focus has been on period film projects with a modern influence, such as the 2016 film Lady Macbeth and the television series The Great (2020–2023). In a 2024 interview with Vogue magazine, she said that she has "often found it frustrating when periods are recreated exactly as they were, and I'm more interested in the scope to play with ideas."

While working on The Great, Waddington met the director Yorgos Lanthimos and was eventually offered the costume design position for his 2023 absurdist comedy film Poor Things. Set anachronistically in the Victorian era, Waddington studied 19th-century fashion plates, but for eclectic influences she also drew upon nontraditional sources such as the modernism of early 20th-century German Expressionism and 1960s fashion; she attempted to "create a wardrobe that was based on a Victorian wardrobe but with the elements kind of broken down and not worn correctly. And so it's playful. It's supposed to be playful. ... You know, she's a woman who is living in a totally made-up world. You needn't root [it] in any reality." Waddington and her team of 40 staff spent 22 weeks creating hundreds of pieces, and for her efforts she eventually won the Academy Award for Best Costume Design. She is best known for her work in this film.

In late 2024, HBO hired Waddington to serve as costume designer for their upcoming television series Harry Potter and planned to begin filming in the summer of 2025. It was the first creative role hired for the project.

== Filmography ==
Costume designer

- Ginger & Rosa (2012)
- Departure (2015)
- Lady Macbeth (2016)
- Poor Things (2023)
- Harry Potter (2027)

Assistant costume designer

- Happy-Go-Lucky (2008)
- The Other Man (2008)
- Glorious 39 (2009)
- Another Year (2010)
- War Horse (2011)
- Lincoln (2012)
- The Man from U.N.C.L.E. (2015)

Other

- Atonement (2007) (unknown)
- Clash of the Titans (2010) ("other")
- 1st Night (2010) (Costume Design Assistant)
- Jack the Giant Slayer (2013) (key costumer)
- The Two Faces of January (2014) (costumer)

== Selected plays ==
- Beware of Pity (2015), a co-production with the Schaubühne and Complicité

== Awards and nominations ==
Major associations

Academy Awards

| Year | Category | Nominated work | Result | Ref. |
|---|---|---|---|---|
| 2024 | Best Costume Design | Poor Things | Won | |

BAFTA Awards

| Year | Category | Nominated work | Result | Ref. |
British Academy Film Awards
| 2024 | Best Costume Design | Poor Things | Won | |

Miscellaneous awards

List of Holly Waddington other awards and nominations
| Award | Year (Note: Indicates the year of ceremony. Each year is linked to the article about the awards held that year, wherever possible.) | Category | Title | Result | Ref. |
|---|---|---|---|---|---|
| American Cinematheque's Tribute to the Crafts | 2024 | Costume Design – Feature Film | Poor Things | Won | |
| Astra Film and Creative Arts Awards | 2024 | Best Costume Design | Poor Things | Won | |
| British Independent Film Awards | 2017 | Best Costume Design | Lady Macbeth | Won | |
| Chicago Film Critics Association | 2023 | Best Costume Design | Poor Things | Won | |
| Costume Designers Guild Awards | 2024 | Excellence in Period Film | Poor Things | Won | |
| Critics' Choice Awards | 2024 | Best Costume Design | Poor Things | Nominated | |
| Fangoria Chainsaw Awards | 2024 | Best Costume Design | Poor Things | Won | |
| Las Vegas Film Critics Society | 2023 | Best Costume Design | Poor Things | Won | |
| Linbury Trust | 2007 | Linbury Prize for Stage Design | —N/a | Finalist | |
| London Film Critics' Circle | 2018 | Technical Achievement Award | Lady Macbeth | Nominated | |
| London Film Critics' Circle | 2024 | Technical Achievement Award | Poor Things | Nominated | |
| Online Film Critics Society | 2024 | Best Costume Design | Poor Things | Nominated | |
| San Diego Film Critics Society | 2023 | Best Costume Design | Poor Things | Runner-up | |
| Santa Barbara International Film Festival | 2024 | Variety Artisans Award | Poor Things | Won | |
| Satellite Awards | 2024 | Best Costume Design | Poor Things | Nominated | |
| Seattle Film Critics Society | 2024 | Best Costume Design | Poor Things | Nominated | |
| St. Louis Film Critics Association | 2023 | Best Costume Design | Poor Things | Runner-up | |
| WFTV Awards | 2024 | The MBS Equipment Co Craft Award | —N/a | Won | |
