= Alec Secăreanu =

Romanian actor (born 1984)

- Born: 4 December 1984 (age 41); Bucharest, Romania
- Education: Caragiale Academy of Theatrical Arts and Cinematography
- Occupation: Actor
- Years active: 2006–present

Alexandru "Alec" Secăreanu (Romanian: [alekˈsandru sekəˈɾe̯anu]; born 4 December 1984) is a Romanian actor. He gained international recognition for playing Gheorghe in the 2017 film God's Own Country.

== Early life ==
Alexandru Secăreanu was born in Bucharest. He completed drama study at the Caragiale Academy of Theatrical Arts and Cinematography in 2007.

== Career ==
After appearing in a number of Romanian films, Secăreanu appeared in his first English-language role in director Francis Lee's God's Own Country (2017), in which he played a Romanian migrant worker Gheorghe, who begins a relationship with a sheep farmer played by British actor Josh O'Connor on a farm in rural West Yorkshire. Lee had insisted on casting a Romanian actor in the role of Gheorghe. After winning the role, he worked on a farm for two weeks before filming. His performance in God's Own Country earned him a London agent, membership of Equity (formerly officially titled the British Actors' Equity Association), and a nomination for 2017 British Independent Film Awards (BIFA) in Best Actor category.

== Personal life ==
As of 2017, Secăreanu lives in Bucharest.

== Filmography ==
=== Film ===
Year	Title	Role	Notes
2007	Scurta Revedere (Short meet again)		Short film; Vlad Fenesan, director
2008	Numele meu este… (My Name Is...)		Short film; Dorin Moldoveanu, director
2008	Ultima zi din cariera de taximetrist a lui 5-9 (The Last Day of His Taxi Driver Career 5-9)		Short film; Ivo Baru, director
2011	Adalbert's Dream	Motostivuitoristu	Credited as Alexandru Secareanu; Gabriel Achim, director
2011	Ursu' (Bear)		Short film; Evgeny Gromik, director
2011	Mătăsari	Alex	Short film; Piperkoski Ilija, director
2013	Treizeci (Thirty)	Răzvan	Short film; Credited as Alexandru Secareanu; Victor Dragomir, director
2014	Love Bus: cinci povești de dragoste din București (Love Bus: Five Love Stories from Bucharest)	George	Omnibus film composed of five different episodes; Episode 5 Cișmigiu; Andrei Georgescu, director
2015	Candy Crush	George	Short film; Andrei Georgescu, director
2016	Minte-mă frumos în Centrul Vechi (Lie to Me Nicely in the Old Town)	Barman	Directed by Iura Luncasu
2016	Tudo	Seba	Directed by Iura Luncasu
2016	Love		Short film; Franz Galo, director
2016	Chosen	Schacht	Directed by Jasmin Dizdar
2017	God's Own Country	Gheorghe Ionescu	Main role; directed by Francis Lee
2017	The Best Customer	Postman/Policeman (voice)	Animation/Short film; Serghei Chiviriga, director
2018	Doing Money	Luca	BBC Two TV movie; Lynsey Miller, director
2020	Amulet	Tomaz	Directed by Romola Garai
2020	Ammonite	Dr. Lieberson	Directed by Francis Lee
2020	The Bike Thief	The Rider	Directed by Matt Chambers
2024	Double of Nothing	Daniel Panait	short film; Mihai Pircalabu, writer and director

=== Television ===
Year	Title	Role	Notes
2006	Daria, iubirea mea	Florin Cernea	
2007	Cu un pas înainte		
2007	One Step Ahead		2 episodes ("Striptease" and "Punct. Și de la capăt")Full stop. And from the top
2011	Pariu cu viațaBet with life	Rapitor 1	2 episodes ("E scris în stele" and "O doamnă și un vagabond: Partea 2")A lady and a vagabond
2014	Fetele lu' dom' ProfesorThe teacher’s daughters	Marcel	
2017	The Saint	Bashir	
2019	Baptiste	Constantin Baracu	BBC TV
2020	Strike Back: Vendetta	Zayef Hiraji	Sky One, Cinemax TV series, 7 episodes
2021	RUXX	Andrei Dobrev	HBO Europe TV series, 8 episodes
2022	Spy/Master	Victor Godeanu	HBO Europe TV series
2023	Happy Valley (TV series) S3	Darius Knezevic	BBC, 6 episodes
2024	The Veil S1	Emir	Hulu, 2 episodes
2024	Moonflower Murders	Stefan Leonida	PBS Masterpiece Theatre, 3 episodes

=== Stage ===
Year	Title	Role	Venue	Ref.
2018	Gundog	Guy	Royal Court Theatre	
	This is a Set Up	Ovidiu Ohanesian	National Museum of Contemporary Art, Bucharest	
2015	Fight Club	Tyler Durden	Teatrul Apropo, Bucharest, Romania	
	Recviem		National Theatre Bucharest	
2013	Immaterial Retrospective of the Venice Biennale		Romanian Pavilion, Venice	
2012	Crisis (Crize – the Gay Version)		Teatrul Tabu, Bucharest	
	Ferdinand the VIII		Comedy Theatre, Bucharest	
	Flowers, Movies, Girls & Boys		Godot Café, Bucharest	
	Get Out!		O2G	
	No One		Metropolis Theatre, Bucharest	
	Of Mice and Men		Port (Casandra Studio)	
	The Forest, Captain's Bride		Nottara Theatre, Bucharest	

== Accolades ==
Award	Year	Category	Nominated work	Result	Ref.
British Independent Film Awards	2017	Best Actor	God's Own Country	Nominated	
