= Doing Money =

- Genre: Crime drama
- Based on: Slave by Jason Johnson
- Written by: Gwyneth Hughes
- Directed by: Lynsey Miller
- Starring: Anca Dumitra; Allen Leech; Karen Hassan; Alec Secăreanu; Mãlina Manovici; Cosmina Stratan; Dragoș Bucur; Sergiu Costache; Alina Şerban; Voica Oltean; Turlough Convery
- Country of origin: Ireland
- Original language: English
- No. of episodes: 1

Production
- Executive producers: Alex Cooke; Lucy Richer
- Producer: Mike Dormer
- Cinematography: Neus Ollé
- Editor: Kristina Hetherington
- Running time: 90 minutes
- Production company: Renegade Pictures

Original release
- Network: BBC Two; RTÉ One
- Release: 5 November 2018

Doing Money is a British television crime drama, written by Gwyneth Hughes and directed by Lynsey Miller, that was first broadcast on BBC Two on 5 November 2018. Focusing on the subject of modern slavery in the sex trade, the film, starring Anca Dumitra and Allen Leech, is based upon the novel Slave by Jason Johnson, published on 3 May 2018.

== Synopsis ==
The film documents the story of 'Ana,' a Romanian student training to be a nurse who is kidnapped in broad daylight from the streets of London and ordered to work as a prostitute in a number of brothels in Ireland and Northern Ireland. Casting for the film was announced in August 2018. The film was broadcast as part of the BBC's Why Slavery? season, to coincide with International Anti Slavery Day.

== Casting ==
Anca Dumitra said of her role as Ana; “Ana is a truly remarkable person, someone who has survived endless abuse with courage and determination, a real-life hero. I have been deeply moved by her story, and it’s an honour to play her in Doing Money. This is a story that needs to be seen" [3] ”

Allen Leech added; “I’m delighted to be part of telling this moving and important true story. Doing Money, Ana’s experience, shines a light on the shocking truth of human trafficking and slavery in Britain. DI Dougie Grant was one of the key officers at the center of the original investigation. It’s a real privilege to play him.”

== Cast ==
- Anca Dumitra as Ana
- Cosmina Stratan as Ancuta Schwarz
- Tom Glynn-Carney as Sean
- Voica Oltean as Skinny
- Alina Ioana Şerban as Lily
- Dragoș Bucur as Ionut Ilie
- Alec Secăreanu as Luca
- Turlough Convery as Declan
- Karen Hassan as DC Rachel Miskelly
- Jonathan Harden as DC Liam Partridge
- Allen Leech as DI Dougie Grant

== Reception ==
Alison Graham of the Radio Times wrote; "After watching Gwyneth Hughes’s fact-based drama Doing Money, I went home stifled by a cloud of misery that couldn’t be dispersed, even by the repeats of ancient Big Bang theories I watched long into the evening just to try to flush the horror from my system. I found Doing Money so overwhelming—the true story of Ana, a young Romanian woman working as a cleaner in Britain who was abducted by a trafficking gang from a street in Wood Green, London, and forced into sex slavery. I was harrowed as she was repeatedly brutalized into submission by a series of men who treated her savagely."

Viewers described the film as "horrific," "disturbing," "harrowing," and "heartbreaking".
