= Francis Hugonin (British Army officer) =

General Francis Lewis Hugonin (3 October 1750 – 29 March 1836) was a British Army cavalry officer who commanded the 4th Dragoons and saw action in the Peninsular War.

== Early life ==
The son of James Hugonin, an officer of Dragoons, and his wife Isabella, Hugonin was baptized at Halesworth, Suffolk, on 5 October 1750. An earlier Francis Lewis Hugonin, born at La Tour de Pil in the Canton of Bern, Switzerland, was a Huguenot naturalized as a British subject on 17 February 1724/25.

== Career ==
Hugonin was commissioned as an officer of dragoons at the age of sixteen. He fought at the Battle of Salamanca of 1812, during the Peninsular War, when as the Colonel commanding the 4th Dragoons he led the regiment’s left squadron in a charge of the Heavy Brigade led overall by Major-General Le Marchant. This is considered the most important British cavalry action of the war.

Hugonin was Colonel of the 4th Dragoons from 9 November 1808 until his death on 29 March 1836.

In 1803, he was gazetted a Major-General, and in July 1810 a Lieutenant General. Finally, on 19 July 1821, he was promoted to the rank of full General.

Hugonin died at home, Nurstead House, near Petersfield, Hampshire, on 29 March 1836, aged 84. The Hampshire Telegraph noted that he had served as an officer of the Queen's Own Light Dragoons for 68 Years. He was buried at Buriton, Hampshire, on 7 April.

== Personal life ==
Hugonin married Charlotte Edgar, of Redhouse, Suffolk, and was the father of James Hugonin (1782–1854), who was commissioned into the 4th Dragoons at the age of thirteen and commanded the regiment at the Battle of Toulouse of 1814. His daughter Charlotte Hugonin (1788–1869), in 1815 married Roderick Murchison and was notable as a botanist.

F. L. Hugonin’s widow died on 16 January 1838, aged 80.
