= Ammonite (film) =

2020 film by Francis Lee

- Official release poster
- Directed by: Francis Lee
- Written by: Francis Lee
- Produced by: Iain Canning; Emile Sherman; Fodhla Cronin O'Reilly
- Starring: Kate Winslet; Saoirse Ronan; Gemma Jones; James McArdle; Alec Secăreanu; Fiona Shaw
- Cinematography: Stéphane Fontaine
- Edited by: Chris Wyatt
- Music by: Dustin O'Halloran; Volker Bertelmann
- Production companies: BFI; BBC Films; See-Saw Films
- Distributed by: Lionsgate (United Kingdom); Transmission Films (Australia)
- Release dates: 11 September 2020 (TIFF); 14 January 2021 (Australia); 26 March 2021 (United Kingdom)
- Running time: 117 minutes
- Countries: United Kingdom; Australia
- Language: English
- Budget: <£10 million ($13.4 million)
- Box office: $1.4 million

Ammonite is a 2020 romantic drama film written and directed by Francis Lee. Loosely inspired by the life of British palaeontologist Mary Anning, played by Kate Winslet, the film centres on a speculative romantic relationship between Anning and geologist Charlotte Murchison, played by Saoirse Ronan. Gemma Jones, James McArdle, Alec Secăreanu and Fiona Shaw also star.

Ammonite had its world premiere at the Toronto International Film Festival on 11 September 2020. It was released in Australia on 14 January 2021 by Transmission Films and in the United Kingdom on 26 March 2021 by Lionsgate.

== Plot ==
In the 1840s, paleontologist Mary Anning lives with her ailing mother, Molly, who helps her daughter run a small shop in Lyme Regis, Dorset. Mary spends the early mornings on the beach at low tide in search of fossils for the shop, with tiny ammonites being her most common find. When Mary returns, she helps her mother wash and polish a collection of eight animal figurines.

One day, Roderick Murchison, an archaeologist, visits Mary's shop with his wife, Charlotte. He expresses admiration for Mary's work and offers to pay her for a guided trip to the shore where he can learn from Mary about fossil collecting. Initially antagonistic, Mary agrees. That night in their room at the Three Cups Hotel, Roderick treats Charlotte coldly, rebuffing her sexual advances, saying that now is not the time to have another baby.

Roderick returns from his morning trip with Mary and finds Charlotte in bed in a depressed state. He returns to Mary's shop and reveals that Charlotte has been sent to Lyme Regis in order to convalesce, and entrusts her to Mary's care as he will be touring Europe for four to six weeks. Mary reluctantly agrees, needing the money. Charlotte begins joining Mary on her morning beach trips.

After sea-bathing as part of her rehabilitation, Charlotte develops a high fever. Her physician, Dr. Lieberson, prescribes bed rest and assigns Mary to nurse her. Mary calls on her friend Elizabeth Philpot, to purchase salve to aid Charlotte's recovery, refusing Elizabeth's offer to stay for a visit. Charlotte recovers, accompanies Mary on more outings, and helps with domestic chores. Together with Mary, she constructs a mirror frame from cowries. Saddened by her own failed attempts to have a baby, Charlotte learns that the figurines which Molly cleans every day represent her eight deceased children.

Dr. Lieberson visits the shop and invites Mary to an evening recital. Mary accepts but insists on bringing Charlotte as well, whom she believes has made a full recovery. That night, Charlotte meets and mingles with the townsfolk as an overwhelmed and jealous Mary smokes outside in the rain while watching through the window. They watch a magic lantern show set to music before Mary leaves and returns home during the rainstorm. Charlotte arrives soon after and finds Mary writing a romantic poem in her journal.

Using the boards from a beached boat, Mary and Charlotte transfer a large rock to the shop. Inside, they find the fossil of an ichthyosaur similar to one which Mary found when she was aged 11 and sent to the British Museum. As they clean Mary's tools in preparation before going to bed, Charlotte kisses Mary goodnight; this inflames their attraction to one another, and they engage in oral sex. Their relationship blossoms, as they swim in the sea and share their meals. A letter arrives from Roderick, instructing Charlotte to return to London. Distraught, Charlotte and Mary have passionate sex the night before Charlotte's departure. Some time later, Molly suffers a fall at home and dies soon afterwards. Elizabeth visits the depressed Mary to express her condolences. She encourages Mary to not abandon her relationship with Charlotte, as Mary did with their own romantic relationship after the death of Mary's father.

Mary receives a letter from Charlotte asking her to come to London. Upon arriving at the Murchison house, Mary sees one of her large ammonite fossils on display in a glass cabinet. Charlotte takes Mary upstairs, where she shows Mary a fully furnished bedroom ready for her to move into. Perturbed, Mary leaves after accusing Charlotte of not respecting her life, stating she will not become an ornament for Charlotte to display in a "gilded cage."

At the British Museum, Mary makes her way through the galleries. She finds the exhibit case containing her original ichthyosaur but sees that it makes no mention of her. Charlotte arrives dressed in clothes similar to Mary's, and the two women gaze at each other through the glass.

== Cast ==
- Kate Winslet as Mary Anning
- Saoirse Ronan as Charlotte Murchison
- Fiona Shaw as Elizabeth Philpot
- Gemma Jones as Molly Anning
- James McArdle as Roderick Murchison
- Alec Secăreanu as Dr. Lieberson
- Claire Rushbrook as Eleanor Butters

== Production ==
In December 2018, it was announced Kate Winslet and Saoirse Ronan had joined the cast of the film, with Francis Lee directing the screenplay he wrote. Iain Canning, Fodhla Cronin O'Reilly and Emile Sherman serve as producers with See-Saw Films, BBC Films and the British Film Institute. In March 2019, Fiona Shaw announced her role in the film. In May 2019, it was announced Alec Secăreanu, James McArdle and Gemma Jones had joined the cast of the film.

Principal photography began on 11 March 2019, in Lyme Regis, Dorset. The scenes were shot chronologically in order to deepen the immersion in the characters' psychological trajectory. David Tucker, director of the Lyme Regis Museum, consulted on the film's scientific accuracy.

== Release ==
In February 2019, Lionsgate and Transmission Films acquired UK and Australian/New Zealand distribution rights to Ammonite, respectively, while Sony Pictures Worldwide Acquisitions took most international territories, including Italy, Latin America, the Middle East, Turkey, Scandinavia, South Africa, Spain and Asia excluding Japan. In January 2020, Neon acquired US and Canadian distribution rights to the film for $3 million. Ammonite was set to world premiere at that year's Cannes Film Festival, prior to its cancellation due to the COVID-19 pandemic. It was also selected to screen at the Telluride Film Festival in Colorado in September of that year, prior to its cancellation also due to the pandemic.

Ammonite had its world premiere at the Toronto International Film Festival on 11 September. Winslet was awarded TIFF's Tribute Actor Award. Ammonite has or is scheduled to be screened at several film festivals including Deauville, Hamptons, Mill Valley, Newfest, Ghent, London, Chicago and Montclair.

Ammonite was theatrically released in the United States on 13 November. It was subsequently released in Australia on 14 January 2021 and in the United Kingdom on 26 March 2021.

== Reception ==
=== Box office ===
In its opening weekend the film grossed $87,552 from 280 cinemas.

=== Critical response ===
On the review aggregator Rotten Tomatoes, the film holds an approval rating of 69% based on 252 reviews, with an average rating of 6.7/10. The website's critical consensus reads, "The chemistry between Saoirse Ronan and a never-better Kate Winslet helps Ammonite transcend its period romance trappings." On Metacritic, the film has a weighted average score of 72 out of 100, based on 41 critics, indicating "generally favorable reviews".

Katie Rife of The A.V. Club gave the film a B− for a lack of chemistry between the leads and an inconsistent tone: "this is a film that runs either burning-hot or bone-chilling cold, contrasting blue toes dipping into freezing, frothy sea water with flushed cheeks and tousled updos in post-coital repose". The Hollywood Reporter placed the movie number 4 at their best films of 2020 year-end list. The film was placed at the 27th position on the IndieWire list of the 50 Best Movies of 2020 and 43rd at the Esquire year-end list. The movie also appeared on the RogerEbert.com "The Best Films of 2020" year-end list.

=== Historical accuracy ===
There is no evidence as to Anning's sexuality in real life, and the film's historical accuracy has been questioned. Two of Anning's distant relatives were reported as having differing views on the decision to depict her as a lesbian, with Lorraine Anning supporting the film, but Barbara Anning criticizing the choice.

Lee defended his decision, saying in a series of tweets, "After seeing queer history be routinely 'straightened' throughout culture, and given a historical figure where there is no evidence whatsoever of a heterosexual relationship, is it not permissible to view that person within another context? Would these newspaper writers have felt the need to whip up uninformed quotes from self-proclaimed experts if the character's sexuality had been assumed to be heterosexual?" Some reviews also criticized the choice. A piece in The Guardian read, "No one knows if Mary Anning had lovers. But what a new film does get right is the vital role women played in her life".

== Accolades ==
Award	Date of ceremony	Category	Recipient(s)	Result	Ref.
AACTA International Awards	6 March 2021	Best Supporting Actress	Saoirse Ronan	Nominated	
ASCAP Film and Television Music Awards	17 May 2021	Film Score of the Year	Volker Bertelmann	Nominated	
British Academy Film Awards	11 April 2021	Best Costume Design	Michael O'Connor	Nominated	
British Independent Film Awards	18 February 2021	Best Costume Design	Michael O'Connor	Nominated	
British Independent Film Awards	18 February 2021	Best Make Up & Hair Design	Ivana Primorac	Nominated	
Casting Society of America Awards	15 April 2021	Artios Award for Outstanding Achievement in Casting - Studio or Independent Feature (Comedy)	Fiona Weir	Nominated	
Dorian Awards	18 April 2021	Best LGBTQ Film	Ammonite	Nominated	
GLAAD Media Award	8 April 2021	GLAAD Media Award for Outstanding Film – Limited Release	Ammonite	Nominated	
Hollywood Music in Media Awards	27 January 2021	Best Original Score in an Independent Film	Dustin O’Halloran and Volker Bertelmann	Nominated	
London Film Critics' Circle	7 February 2021	Technical Achievement (cinematography)	Stéphane Fontaine	Nominated	
North Dakota Film Society Awards	15 January 2021	Best Actress	Kate Winslet	Nominated	
North Dakota Film Society Awards	15 January 2021	Best Supporting Actress	Saoirse Ronan	Nominated	
North Dakota Film Society Awards	15 January 2021	Best Original Score	Dustin O’Halloran and Volker Bertelmann	Nominated	
Online Association of Female Film Critics	1 March 2021	Best Cinematography	Stéphane Fontaine	Nominated	
San Francisco International Film Festival	18 December 2020	SFFILM Sloan Science in Cinema Prize	Ammonite	Won	
Satellite Awards	15 February 2021	Best Actress in a Motion Picture – Drama	Kate Winslet	Nominated	
Seville European Film Festival	14 November 2020	Golden Giraldillo	Ammonite	Nominated	
The International Film Festival of the Art of Cinematography Camerimage	21 November 2020	Golden Frog	Ammonite	Nominated	
Women Film Critics Circle Awards	8 March 2021	Best Movie About Women	Ammonite	Runner-up	
Women Film Critics Circle Awards	8 March 2021	Best Screen Couple	Kate Winslet and Saoirse Ronan	Won	
Women Film Critics Circle Awards	8 March 2021	Best Kept Secret – Overlooked Challenging Gems	Ammonite	Won	
