= Roderick Murchison =

British geologist (1792–1871)

Sir Roderick Murchison Bt KCB FRS HonFRSE FLS MRIA
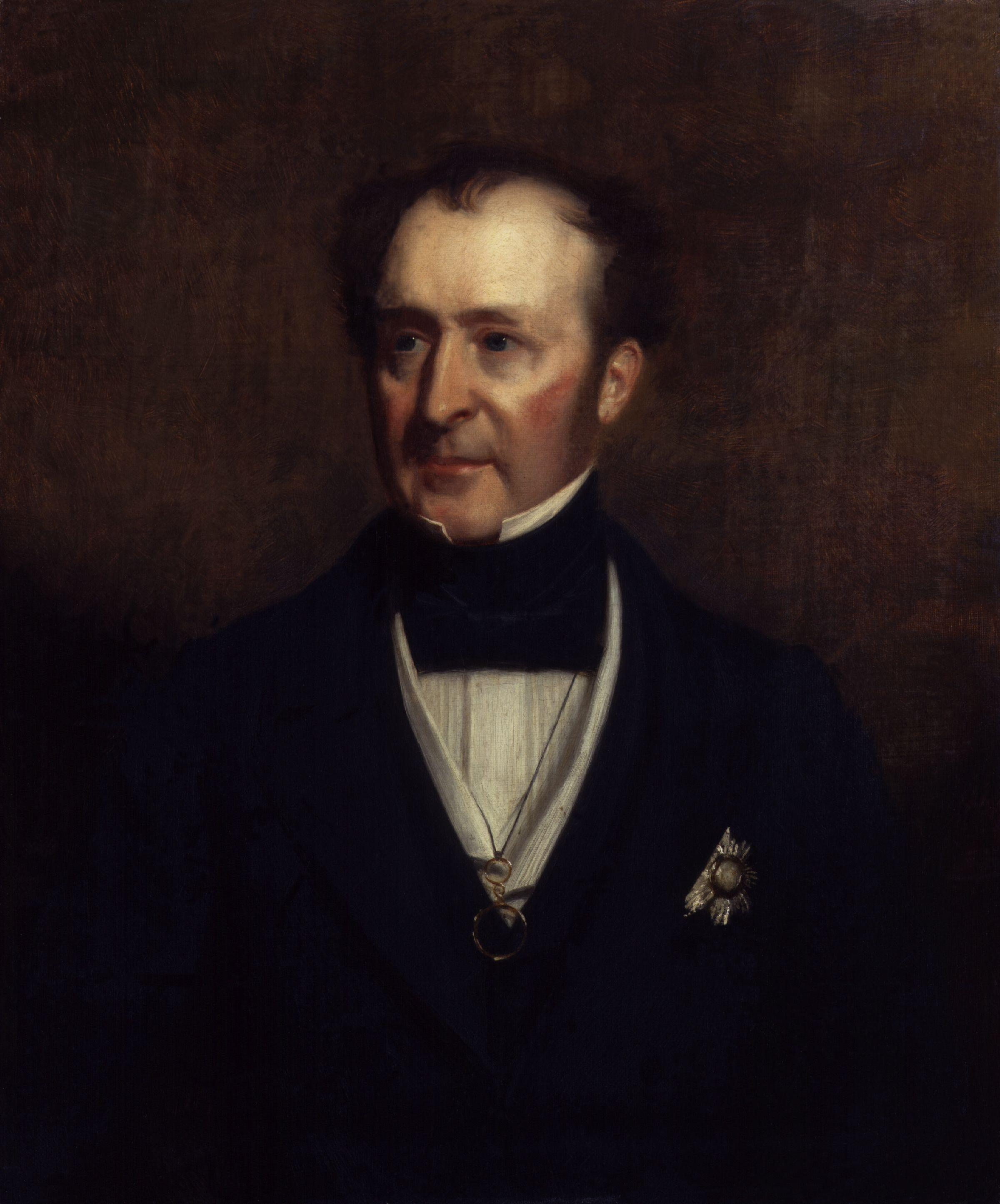
- Portrait by Stephen Pearce, 1856
- Born: 19 February 1792; Tarradale House, Muir of Ord, Ross-shire, Scotland
- Died: 22 October 1871 (aged 79); London, England
- Known for: Silurian system Devonian system Permian system
- Spouse: Charlotte Hugonin (m. 1815; died 1869)
- Awards: Copley Medal (1849); Makdougall Brisbane Prize (1859); Wollaston Medal (1864); Founder's Medal (1871)
- Scientific career
- Fields: Geology

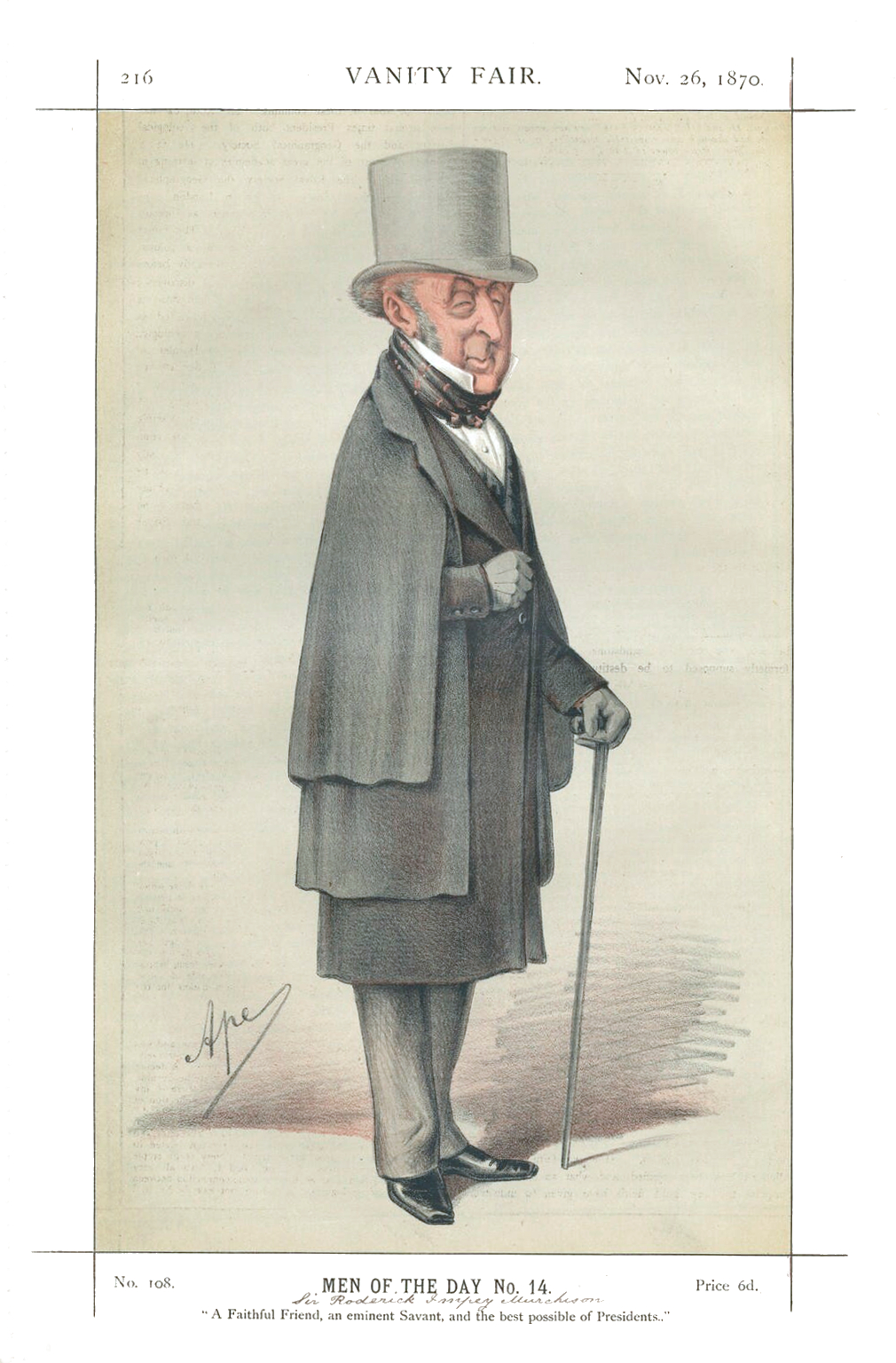
Vanity Fair print of Sir Roderick Murchison

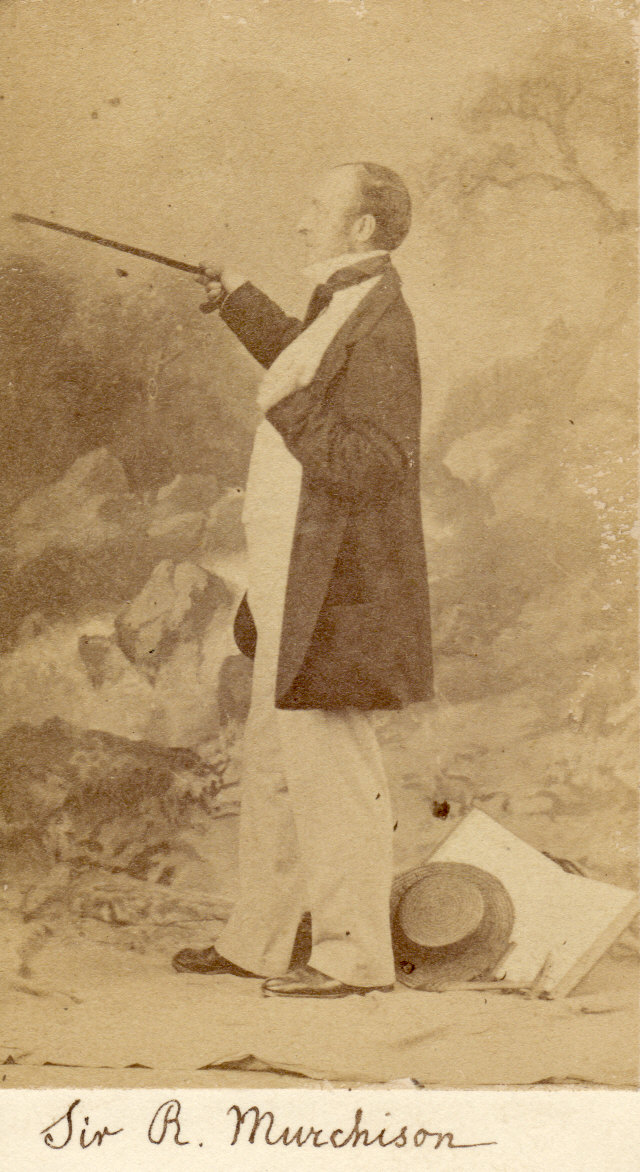
Roderick Impey Murchison posing with cane

Sir Roderick Impey Murchison, 1st Baronet (19 February 1792 – 22 October 1871) was a Scottish geologist who served as director-general of the British Geological Survey from 1855 until his death in 1871. He is noted for investigating and describing the Silurian, Devonian and Permian systems.

== Early life and work ==
Murchison was born at Tarradale House, Muir of Ord, Ross-shire, the son of Barbara and Kenneth Murchison. His wealthy father died in 1796, when Roderick was four years old, and he was sent to Durham School three years later and then to the Royal Military College, Great Marlow, to be trained for the army. In 1808, under Wellesley, he landed in Portugal, and was present at the actions of Roliça and Vimeiro in the Peninsular War as an ensign in the 36th Regt of Foot. Subsequently, under Sir John Moore, he took part in the retreat to Corunna and the final battle there.

After eight years of service Murchison left the army and married Charlotte Hugonin (1788–1869), the only daughter of General Francis Hugonin of Nursted House, Hampshire. Murchison and his wife spent two years in mainland Europe, particularly in Italy. They then settled in Barnard Castle, County Durham, England, in 1818, where Murchison made the acquaintance of Sir Humphry Davy. Davy urged Murchison to turn his energy to science, after hearing that he wasted his time riding to hounds and shooting. With encouragement from his wife Charlotte, Murchison became fascinated by the young science of geology and joined the Geological Society of London, soon becoming one of its most active members. His colleagues there included Adam Sedgwick, William Conybeare, William Buckland, William Fitton, Charles Lyell and Charles Darwin.

Exploring with his wife, Murchison studied the geology of the south of England, devoting special attention to the rocks of the north-west of Sussex and the adjoining parts of Hampshire and Surrey, on which, aided by Fitton, he wrote his first scientific paper, read to the Geological Society of London in 1825. Turning his attention to Continental geology, he and Lyell explored the volcanic region of Auvergne, parts of southern France, northern Italy, Tyrol and Switzerland. A little later, with Sedgwick as his companion, Murchison attacked the difficult problem of the geological structure of the Alps. Their joint paper giving the results of their study is a classic in the literature of Alpine geology.

Murchison was an opponent of Charles Darwin's theory of evolution. He opposed the transmutation of species and supported successive creation.

== Silurian system ==
In 1831 he went to the England–Wales border, to attempt to discover whether the greywacke rocks underlying the Old Red Sandstone could be grouped into a definite order of succession. The result was the establishment of the Silurian system under which were grouped, for the first time, a remarkable series of formations, each replete with distinctive organic remains other than and very different from those of the other rocks of England. These researches, together with descriptions of the coalfields and overlying formations in South Wales and the English border counties, were embodied in The Silurian System (1839). The English naturalist, geologist, and palaeontologist John William Salter assisted Murchison in his work on Siluria (1854 and later editions).

The establishment of the Silurian system was followed by that of the Devonian system, an investigation in which Murchison assisted, both in the south-west of England and in the Rhineland. Soon afterwards Murchison projected an important geological campaign in Russia with the view of extending to that part of the Continent the classification he had succeeded in elaborating for the older rocks of western Europe. He was accompanied by Édouard de Verneuil (1805–1873) and Count Alexander von Keyserling (1815–1891), in conjunction with whom he produced a work on Russia and the Ural Mountains. The publication of this monograph in 1845 completes the first and most active half of Murchison's scientific career. He was elected a Foreign Honorary Member of the American Academy of Arts and Sciences in 1840.

In 1846 he was knighted, and in the same year he presided over the meeting of the British Association at Southampton. During the later years of his life, a large part of his time was devoted to the affairs of the Royal Geographical Society, of which he was in 1830 one of the founders, and he was president 1843–1845, 1851–1853, 1856–1859 and 1862–1871. He served on the Royal Commission on the British Museum (1847–1849).

Murchison also announced the Permian system to geology in 1841, based on explorations in Perm Krai undertaken with Édouard de Verneuil.

Murchison was responsible for establishing much of the international prestige of British geology, and he viewed the spread of his stratigraphic systems on maps around the world "as a scientific form of imperial expansion". He frequently described geological excursions (such those he made abroad) as "invasions" or "conquests" and enjoyed being dubbed the "King of Siluria". According to the scholar Robert A. Stafford, "Murchinson's tendencies towards militarism, imperialism, and megalomania ran through his career and finally found full expression his simultaneous leadership of the Royal Geographical Society and the British Geological Survey."

== Scotland ==
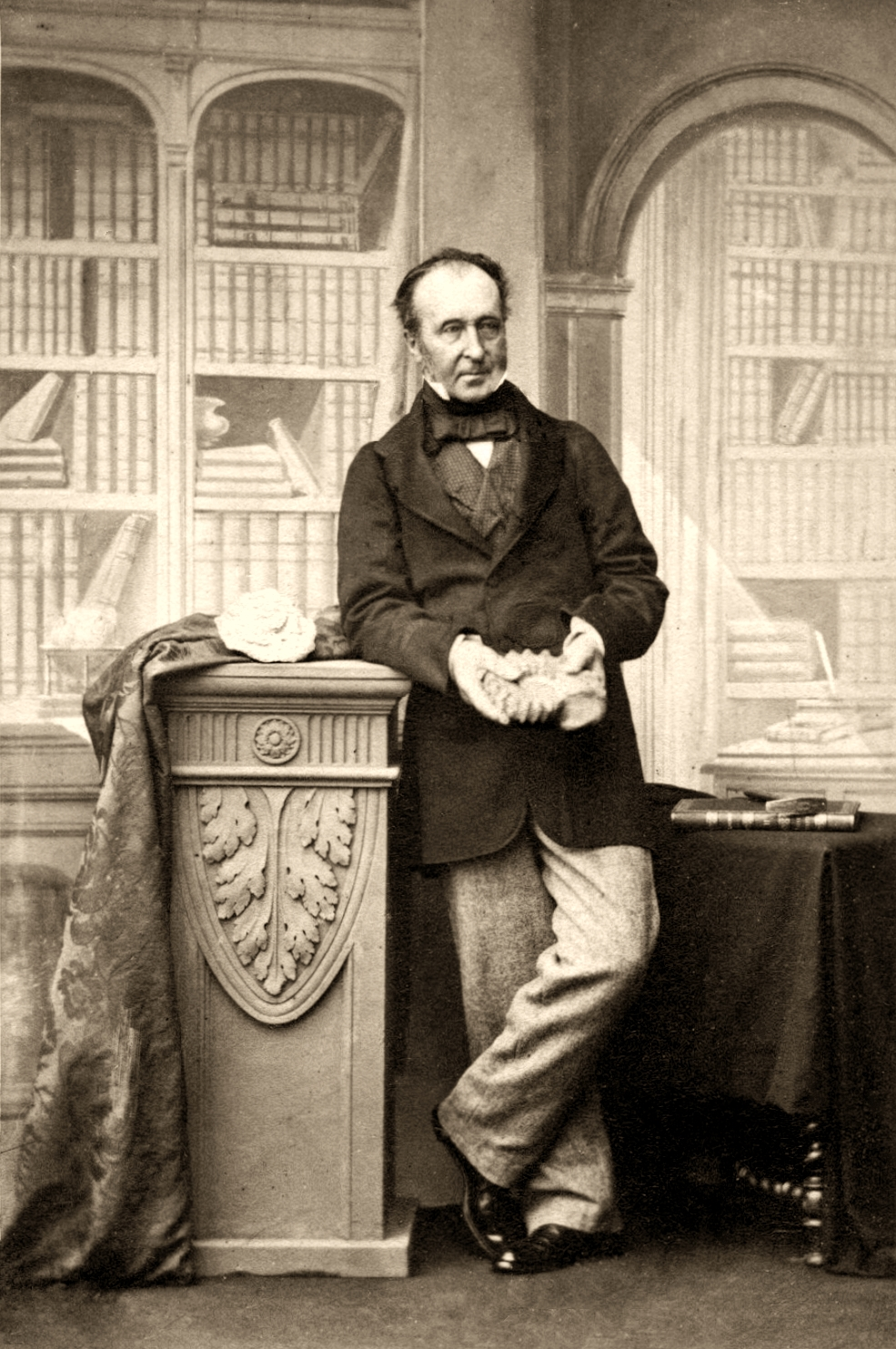
Murchison photographed by Camille Silvy in 1860

The chief geological investigation of the last decade of his life was devoted to the Highlands of Scotland, where he wrongly believed he had succeeded in showing that the vast masses of crystalline schists, previously supposed to be part of what used to be termed the Primitive formations, were really not older than the Silurian period, since underneath them lay beds of limestone and quartzite containing Lower Silurian (Cambrian) fossils. This started off what became known as the Highlands Controversy. James Nicol recognised the fallacy in Murchison's theory and propounded his own ideas; in the 1880s these were superseded by the correct theory of Charles Lapworth, which was corroborated by Benjamin Peach and John Horne. Their subsequent research showed that the infraposition of the fossiliferous rocks is not their original place, but had been brought about by a gigantic system of dislocations, whereby successive masses of the oldest gneisses, have been exhumed from below and thrust over the younger formations.

In 1855 Murchison was appointed director-general of the British Geological Survey and director of the Royal School of Mines and the Museum of Practical Geology in Jermyn Street, London, in succession to Sir Henry De la Beche, who had been the first to hold these offices. Official routine now occupied much of his time, but he found opportunity for the Highland researches just alluded to, and also for preparing successive editions of his work Siluria (1854, ed. 5, 1872), which was meant to present the main features of the original Silurian System together with a digest of subsequent discoveries, particularly of those that showed the extension of the Silurian classification into other countries.

== Later life ==
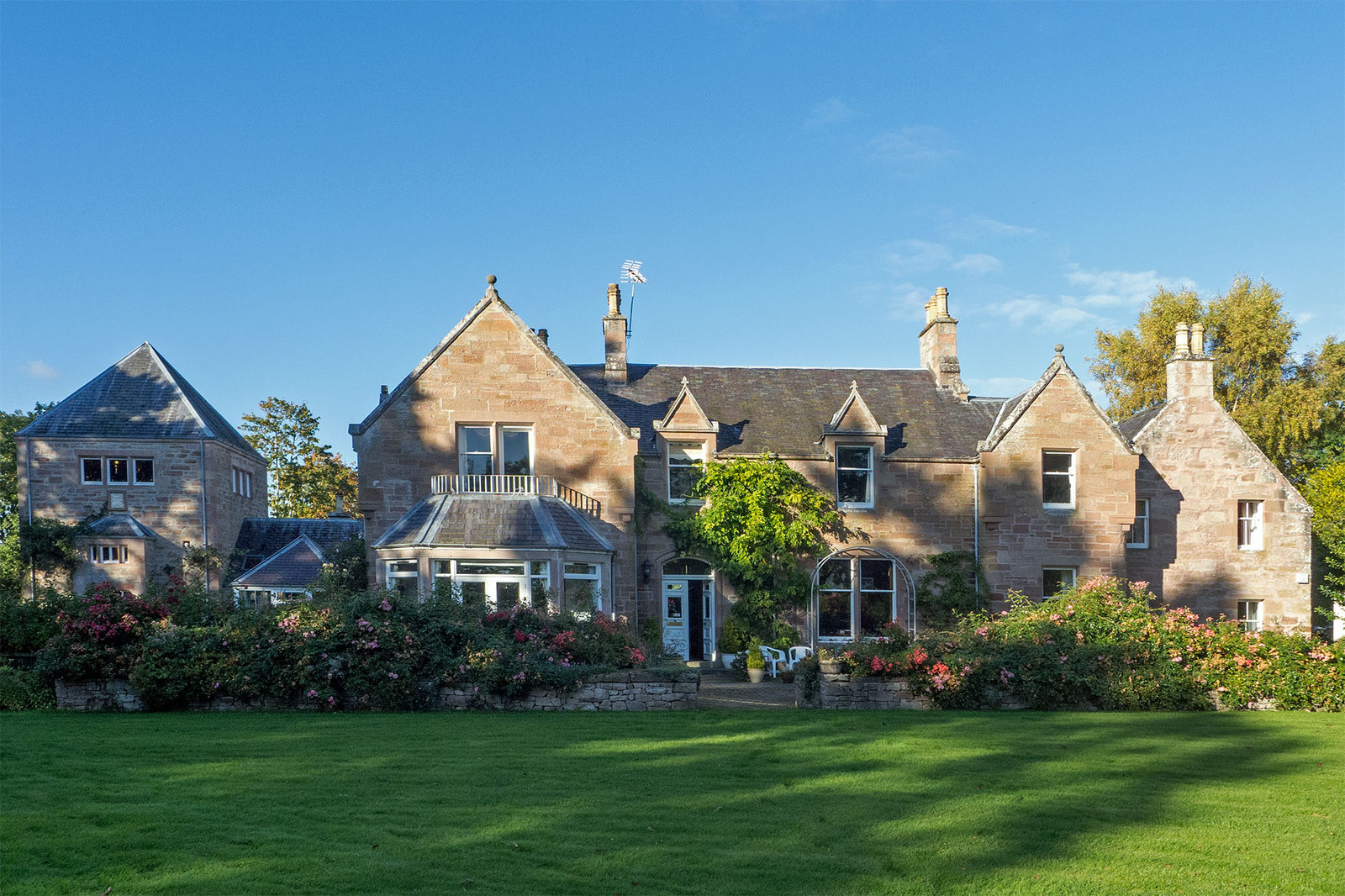
Tarradale House

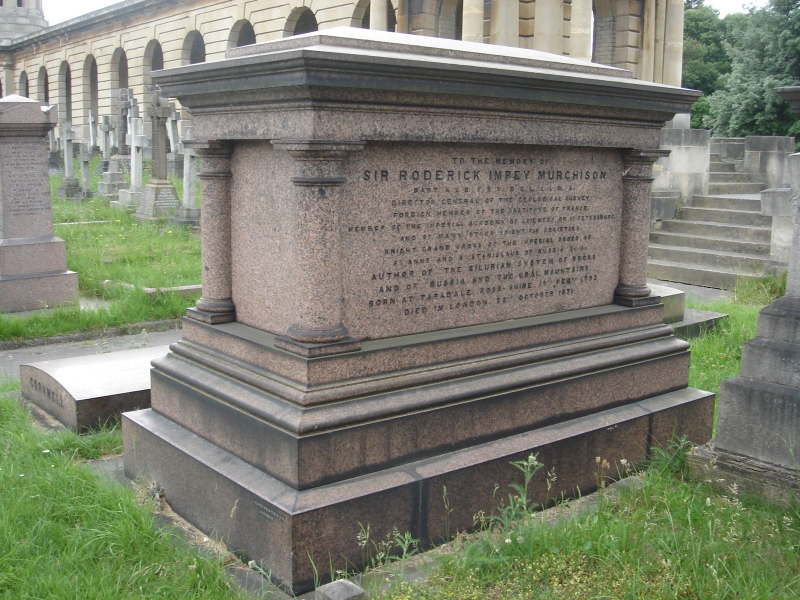
Funerary monument, Brompton Cemetery, London

In 1845, whilst visiting Carclew in Cornwall, he met several Cornish miners who were going to Australia. Believing that there might be gold there, he asked them to send back likely samples. They did this, and thus Murchison knew of the existence of gold in Australia before Edward Hargraves' discovery. In 1857, Murchison was elected a member of the American Antiquarian Society. Three years later, he was elected to the American Philosophical Society.

In 1863 he was made a KCB, and three years later he was created a baronet. The learned societies of his own country bestowed their highest rewards upon him: the Royal Society gave him the Copley Medal, the Geological Society its Wollaston medal, and the Royal Society of Edinburgh its Brisbane Medal. There was hardly a foreign scientific society of note without his name among its honorary members. The French Academy of Sciences awarded him the prix Cuvier, and elected him one of its eight foreign members in succession to Michael Faraday. In 1855 he was elected a foreign member of the Royal Swedish Academy of Sciences and in 1871 awarded the Founders' Medal of the Royal Geographical Society.

One of the closing public acts of Murchison's life was the founding of a chair of geology and mineralogy at the University of Edinburgh. Under his will there was established the Murchison Medal and a geological fund (The Murchison Fund) to be awarded annually by the council of the Geological Society in London.

Murchison died in 1871 and is buried in Brompton Cemetery, London, near the north end of the arcade on the west side of the central path.

== Legacy ==
The crater Murchison on the Moon and at least fifteen geographical locations on Earth are named after him.

These include: the Murchison Range, part of the Stauning Alps, and the Murchison Sound in Greenland; Mount Murchison in Banff National Park, Canada; Mount Murchison in the Mountaineer Range, Antarctica; Mount Murchison, just west of Squamish, British Columbia, Canada; tiny Murchison Island in Haida Gwaii in the same province; the Murchison Falls in Uganda; the Murchison River in Western Australia. Murchison has two other rivers named after him in Western Australia: the Roderick River and the Impey River, both tributaries of the Murchison. The town of Murchison in the Tasman District of New Zealand's South Island was also named after him. Other New Zealand places named after him include Mount Murchison in Arthur's Pass National Park, Murchison Glacier in Aoraki / Mount Cook National Park, and the Murchison Mountains in Fiordland National Park.

Murchison Road is one of the streets in east London, and there is a Murchison Avenue in Old Bexley, southeast London. Scarborough in North Yorkshire has a Murchison Street.

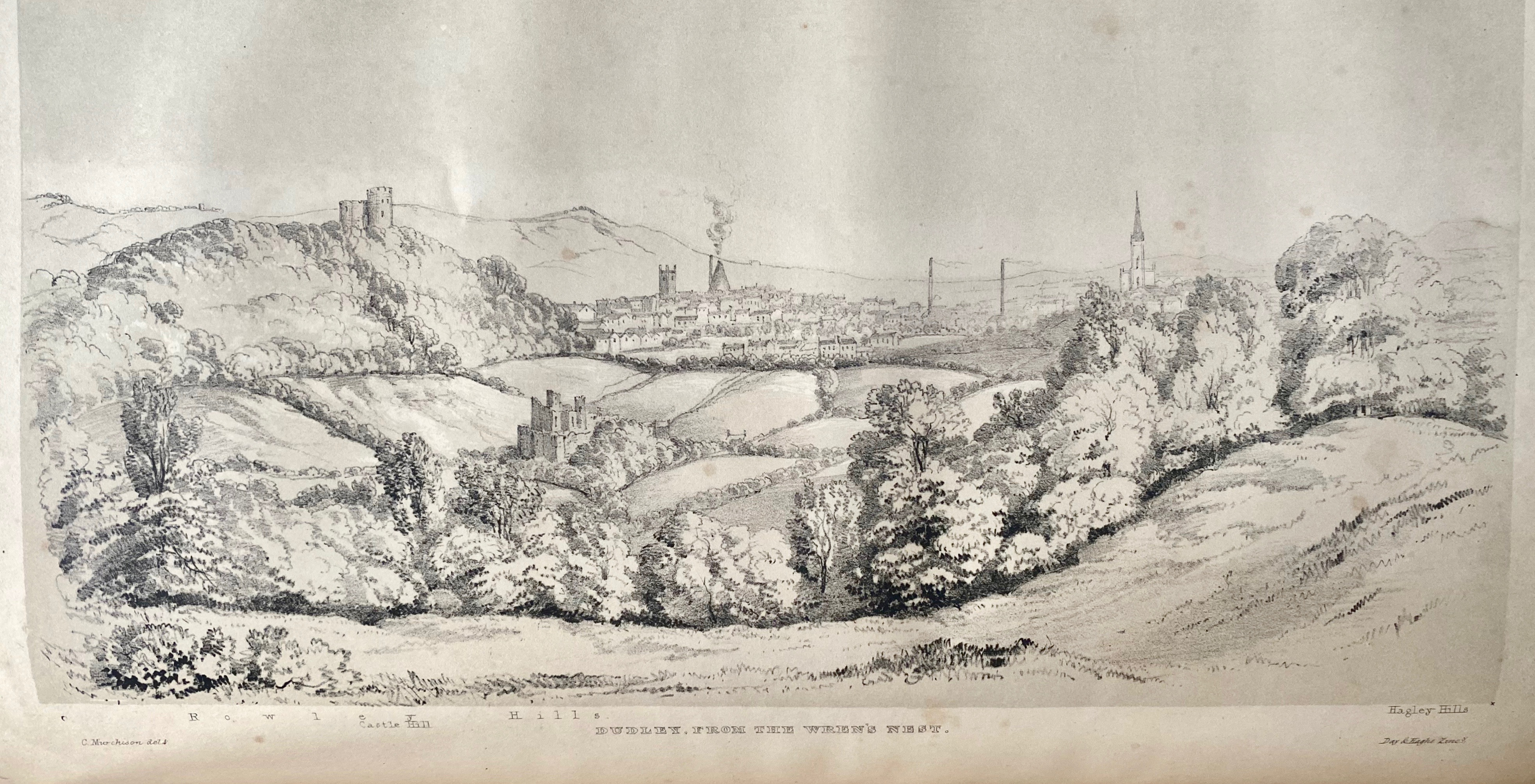
Lithographic Sketch, Dudley from Wren's Nest by Charlotte Murchison in The Silurian System, 1839, p.480

Murchison's View is named after him. The viewpoint within the Wren's Nest area of Dudley gives a panoramic view over much of Birmingham and the Black Country. Murchinson's visits to the limestone hills of Dudley helped him to develop his understanding of the Silurian System. When he returned to the area in 1849 he was greeted by 15,000 locals who declared him the King of Siluria.

=== Memorials ===
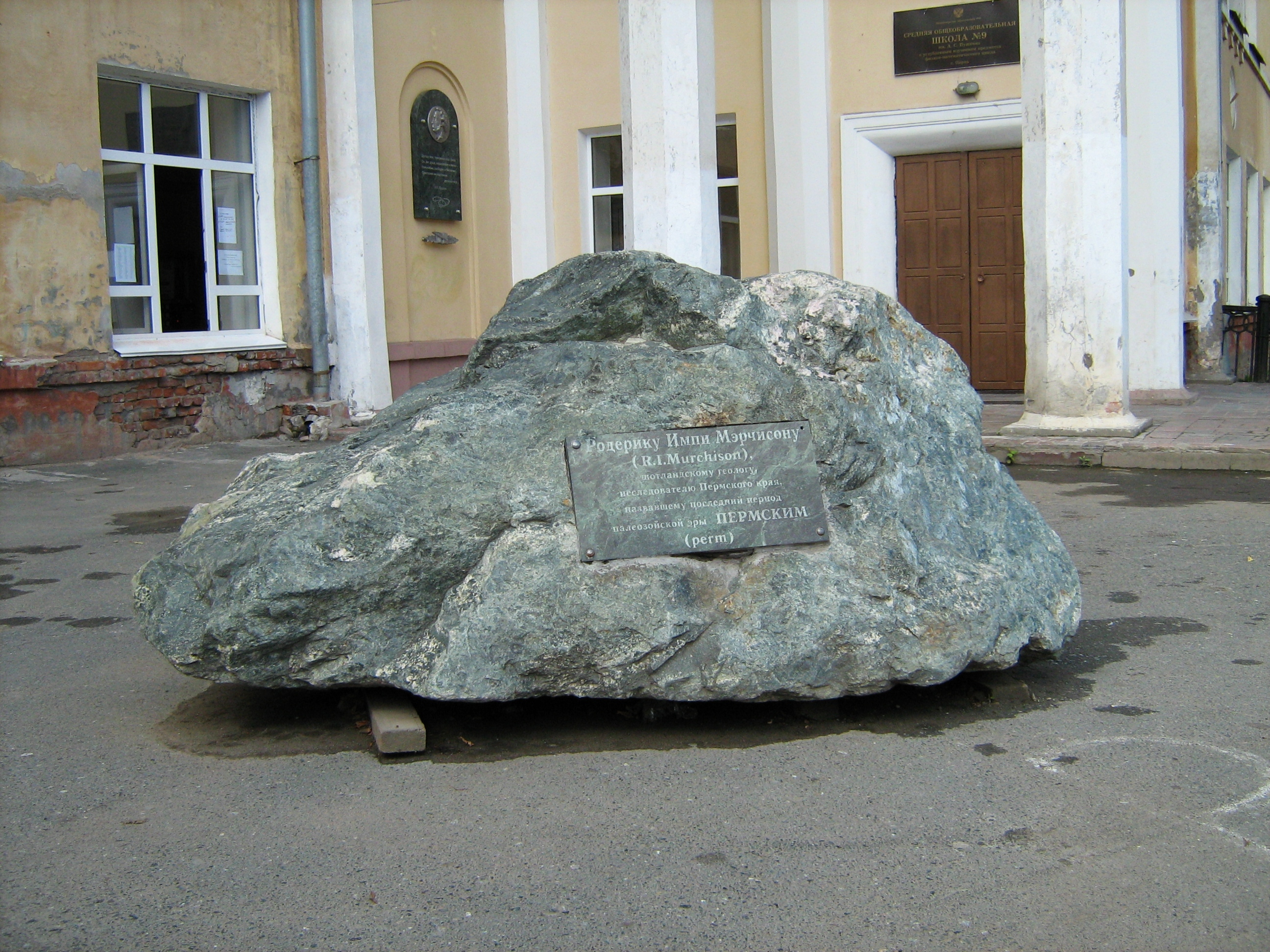
Memorial stone and tablet in Perm, Russia

A memorial tablet was installed on 3 November 2005 in front of School #9 in Perm in Russia. It consists of a stone base, irregular in form, about two metres long, and bearing a dark stone plate with the following inscription (in Russian):

To Roderick Impey Murchison, Scottish geologist, explorer of Perm Krai,

who gave to the last period of the Paleozoic era the name of Permian.

The decision to perpetuate the explorer's name was accepted by the school administration and pupils in connection with a discussion to establish in Perm a pillar or an arch devoted to Roderick Murchison.

In 2009, the Ural-Scottish Society erected a memorial to Murchison on the banks of the Chusovaya River. There is a commemorative blue plaque on his residence at 21 Galgate in Barnard Castle (County Durham).

A fictionalised version of Murchison appears in the 2020 film Ammonite. He is played by James McArdle.

== Bibliography ==
- Outline of the Geology of the Neighbourhood of Cheltenham. H. Davies. 1834.
- The Silurian System. London: John Murray. 1839.
- On the Geological Structure of the Central and Southern Regions of Russia in Europe, and of the Ural Mountains. Print. by R. and J.E. Taylor. 1842.
- Geology of Russia in Europe and the Ural Mountains. Vol. 1: Parts 1 & 2 – Geology. 1845. with Edouard de Verneuil and Count Alexander Keyserling
- Géologie de la Russie d'Europe et des montagnes de l'Oural [Geology of Russia in Europe and the Ural Mountains] (in French). Vol. 2: Part 3 – Palaeontology. Paris: P. Bertrand. 1845.

Baronetage of the United Kingdom
New creation	Baronet (of Belgrave Square); 1866–1871	Extinct
