= Amulet (film) =

2020 film by Romola Garai

- Theatrical release poster
- Directed by: Romola Garai
- Written by: Romola Garai
- Produced by: Matthew James Wilkinson; Maggie Monteith
- Starring: Carla Juri; Alec Secăreanu; Angeliki Papoulia; Imelda Staunton
- Cinematography: Laura Bellingham
- Edited by: Alastair Reid
- Music by: Sarah Angliss
- Production companies: AMP International; Northern Stories; Stigma Films; Summercourt Films
- Distributed by: Republic Film Distribution
- Release dates: 26 January 2020 (Sundance); 28 January 2022 (United Kingdom)
- Running time: 99 minutes
- Country: United Kingdom
- Language: English
- Box office: $53,019

Amulet is a 2020 British supernatural horror film written and directed by Romola Garai and starring Carla Juri, Alec Secăreanu, Angeliki Papoulia and Imelda Staunton. It follows a homeless ex-soldier who is offered a place to stay at a decaying house in London, inhabited by a young woman and her dying mother, but begins to suspect that something unnatural is also present.

The film premiered at the Sundance Film Festival on 26 January 2020 and was released in cinemas in the United Kingdom on 28 January 2022 by Republic Film Distribution.

== Plot ==
Ex-soldier, Tomaz, unearths an amulet at an outpost in the woods. It becomes apparent that this is where he was stationed in his former country, which he eventually escaped to make it to London. Tomaz periodically has flashbacks to this time and Miriam, a woman who took shelter with him after he spared her life when he caught her trying to pass the border.

In London, Tomaz works as a day laborer while sleeping in a derelict building with other refugees. When the building is set on fire, Tomaz is forced to flee suddenly in the night. Unable to breathe from the smoke, he collapses in an alley way and is discovered by Sister Claire, a nun. After visiting him in the hospital, she suggests a better way of life for him and takes him to a house, explaining that a woman living there, Magda, needs help with the house upkeep as she cares for her dying mother. As she walks away, she is seen throwing Tomaz's money (which he thought lost) into the sewer.

Magda makes it clear she doesn't want Tomaz there, and he, too, is reluctant to stay. However, the two grow accustomed to one another, and Tomaz tries to perform repairs. When trying to fix the water pipes, Tomaz discovers a live albino bat clogging the toilet. He kills it, but not before it bites him.

Tomaz eventually sees Magda's mother, whom she keeps imprisoned in the attic. Though she is extremely ill, she attacks Magda in front of Tomaz, and he becomes protective of Magda. He takes her out on the town, fulfilling her wish to go out dancing all night if she was free.

Returning home, Magda and Tomaz see her mother giving birth to one of the bat-like creatures he saw in the toilet. Tomaz goes to consult Sister Claire, and she tells him that the mother is a demon, and that she and Magda have been charged with keeping it contained for years. Tomaz returns to the house, determined to kill the demon and save Magda. However, after stabbing the demon in the throat, it bites and attacks Tomaz, only to be stopped by Magda.

Tomaz then flashes back to his time with Miriam. Developing a crush on her, he urges her to stay with him until the end of the war and protects her from fellow soldiers. However, after discovering her trying to leave in an attempt to reunite with her daughter, he chases her and rapes her.

Awakening in the house, Tomaz, determined to protect Magda, returns and attacks the demon. Once he beheads it, he realizes that the host body was actually that of the previous occupant of the house, a man who murdered his wife with the intent to marry one of his own children. Sister Claire explains that he is now the new host and asks him who he wants to be his guardian. He demands that Magda watch over him. Later, Tomaz is sick. As his stomach begins to move, he too gives birth to one of the creatures.

Later, Magda drives up to a convenience store where Miriam is working the counter. After making sure that Miriam is all right, she drives off and throws some food in the back where Tomaz is hiding under a blanket.

== Cast ==
- Carla Juri as Magda
- Alec Secăreanu as Tomaz
- Angeliki Papoulia as Miriam
- Imelda Staunton as Sister Claire
- Anah Ruddin as Mother

== Production ==
The film was announced in April 2018, along with the cast. Production began in autumn 2018 under the original title Outside. Matthew James Wilkinson, the film's producer, called it "feminist horror" and that Garai "definitely wanted to take a look at what is happening in terms of recent gender politics and stand it on its head."

== Release ==
Amulet premiered in the Midnight section of the Sundance Film Festival on 26 January 2020. The film was released in select cinemas and on video on demand in the United States on 24 July 2020 by Magnolia Pictures' horror department, Magnet Releasing. It was released in cinemas in the United Kingdom on 28 January 2022 by Republic Film Distribution.

== Reception ==
On the review aggregator website Rotten Tomatoes, the film holds an approval rating of 73% based on 94 reviews, with an average rating of 6.2/10. The website's critics consensus reads: "If its chilly sense of dread never quite becomes spine-tingling terror, Amulet remains smart, solidly disquieting fun for genre fans seeking slow-building horror." Metacritic, which uses a weighted average, assigned the film a score of 62 out of 100, based on 24 critics, indicating "generally favorable" reviews.

David Rooney of The Hollywood Reporter called the film "smart and stylish" and wrote: "Garai steadily builds suspense while keeping her intentions enigmatic until quite late in the action. She eventually folds together mysteries of the past with terrors of the present in an out-there final act that goes full-throttle Dario Argento, mixing digital and hand-made effects in a sea of garish reds and bizarre pagan visions." Justin Chang of Fresh Air called the film an "intensely creepy supernatural freakout" and praised the "strikingly assured" writing and direction of Garai. It was Mark Kermode's film of the week for the Kermode and Mayo's Film Review programme on BBC Radio 5 Live.
