= Lady Macbeth (film) =

2016 British film by William Oldroyd

- UK theatrical release poster
- Directed by: William Oldroyd
- Screenplay by: Alice Birch
- Based on: Lady Macbeth of the Mtsensk District by Nikolai Leskov
- Produced by: Fodhla Cronin O'Reilly
- Starring: Florence Pugh; Naomi Ackie; Cosmo Jarvis; Paul Hilton; Christopher Fairbank
- Cinematography: Ari Wegner
- Edited by: Nick Emerson
- Music by: Dan Jones; Ben Baird
- Production companies: iFeatures; Creative England; BBC Films; British Film Institute
- Distributed by: Altitude Film Distribution (UK)
- Release dates: 9 September 2016 (TIFF); 28 April 2017 (UK)
- Running time: 89 minutes
- Country: United Kingdom
- Language: English
- Budget: US$440–650 thousand
- Box office: US$6.4 million

Lady Macbeth is a 2016 British period drama (Note: Attributed to multiple sources.) film directed by William Oldroyd, from a script by Alice Birch, and produced by Fodhla Cronin O'Reilly; it is the feature film debut for Oldroyd, Birch, and O'Reilly. Based on the 1865 novella Lady Macbeth of the Mtsensk District by Nikolai Leskov, it tells the story of Katherine Lester, a young woman who rids herself of controlling in-laws to live with her workman lover then secures her place in the landed gentry. The film stars Florence Pugh, Naomi Ackie, Cosmo Jarvis, Paul Hilton, and Christopher Fairbank.

With backgrounds in the theatre, Birch and Oldroyd wanted to make a different kind of British period drama. A lavish production, typical of the genre, was not possible on their micro budget. The story was moved from European Russia to Northumberland, England. Birch focused on the crime part of the novella, set in and around the family's house. By changing how that ended, she eliminated the punishment part, set elsewhere. Oldroyd's research suggested that the region was more racially diverse in the 19th century than is generally believed today. Colour-blind casting led to diversity in four key roles: in the principal cast Naomi Ackie as Anna and Cosmo Jarvis as Sebastian, and in the supporting cast child actor Anton Palmer as Alexander's ward Teddy and Golda Rosheuvel as Teddy's grandmother and legal guardian Agnes. This added the element of race to the themes of gender and class from the novella.

Lady Macbeth was a minimalist production. The Lesters's house was represented by a small number of sparsely furnished interiors at Lambton Castle in County Durham, and the characters had few costume changes. It was filmed in September–October 2015 using mostly natural light and wide master shots of scenes that were often formally composed in a static frame. The film has an expressionist soundscape of people in the house and nature on the surrounding estate. The only music is an eerie theme which plays after each murder committed by Katherine.

Lady Macbeth had its world premiere at the 2016 Toronto International Film Festival. It first went on general release in Europe during April 2017. The film received positive reviews and two European accolades. At the 2017 British Independent Film Awards, it won accolades for Pugh and Ackie's performances, the screenplay, cinematography and costume design. Lady Macbeth has grossed US$6.4 million worldwide.

== Plot ==
In 1865, a young woman named Katherine joins the landed gentry by marrying Alexander Lester. His domineering father Boris bought Katherine to produce a legitimate heir with Alexander. They live on Boris's rural estate in Northumberland, England. Little of the couple's backstory emerges. She and her late mother shared an interest in walking and nature. He has a colliery and an illegitimate child across the county in Amble, and a repressed hatred of Boris.

Katherine prepares for the wedding night with her maid Anna, who serves the household with a younger maid and a cook. Alexander arrives and tells Katherine she should stay indoors despite her interests. He has a voyueristic interest in her but refuses to consummate their marriage, and she tires of her solitary indoor routine. One day, Alexander leaves for Amble, while Boris travels to London. In their absence, Katherine enjoys walking around the estate. Katherine finds the estate workmen abusing Anna in an outbuilding, where the men live. Having freed Anna, Katherine is intrigued by the ringleader Sebastian, and they soon begin an overt affair. Anna becomes concerned by Katherine's behaviour, while Katherine suspects Anna has shared her concerns with their priest.

Boris returns. Katherine has drunk his stock of Beaujolais, but Anna takes the blame, and Boris humiliates her. Boris hears about the affair. He beats Sebastian then locks him up. Having argued over Sebastian's release and the lack of an heir, Boris strikes Katherine across her face. The next day, she poisons his breakfast which includes mushrooms foraged by Anna. As Boris struggles in an adjacent room, Katherine orders Anna to sit with her until he falls silent. His death is not generally regarded as suspicious, but Anna is traumatized and goes mute. Alexander refuses to attend Boris's funeral.

Katherine moves Sebastian into the house. Late one night, she wakes as Alexander returns unexpectedly. They meet in their bedroom, while Sebastian hides in the closet. Having promised to dishonor Boris at his grave, Alexander confronts Katherine over the affair and the damage to his reputation. He says Sebastian will be dismissed, and she will live indoors. Katherine responds by fetching Sebastian for sex. As the men fight, Katherine arms herself with a poker then bludgeons Alexander to death. Evidence of Alexander's return is disposed of in woodland: Sebastian buries his body, while Katherine kills his horse with a shotgun. They live together as mistress and master. Enough time passes that Alexander is generally regarded as missing presumed dead.

A young boy and his grandmother, Teddy and Agnes, arrive to live in the house. Agnes explains that Alexander stayed with them in Amble then left to return home to Katherine. Teddy is his illegitimate son with her late daughter. Alexander made the boy his ward so, as Teddy's legal guardian, Agnes replaces Katherine as mistress. Sebastian resumes his working life but is resentful and avoids Katherine. Katherine realises she is pregnant. Trying to catch up with Sebastian, she upsets Teddy who runs away. Sebastian eventually finds him on a moorland cliff above a waterfall. He considers pushing Teddy over the edge but carries him back to the house to recover from the cold. Bursting in on Katherine, Agnes and doctor Burdon, Sebastian calls for blankets. Agnes objects to him giving orders and tells him to get out.

Sebastian feels humiliated and packs to leave the estate, but Katherine persuades him to stay. Teddy sleeps while Agnes watches him. Having persuaded Agnes to take a break, Katherine lets Sebastian in from outside. She smothers Teddy with a pillow, while he restrains the boy's legs. In the morning, Katherine claims Teddy must have died after she dozed off. However, the doctor notices Teddy was bruised overnight. Sebastian becomes overwhelmed. As a detective questions Katherine over the bruises, he enters and confesses his part in Teddy's death. Sebastian accuses Katherine of committing all three murders so they could live together. After listening impassively, Katherine counter-accuses him and Anna. She claims Teddy was like her own child, and Agnes comforts her. Anna remains mute when questioned. She and Sebastian are arrested. The household's staff leave the estate. Now alone, Katherine resumes her indoor routine.

== Cast ==
- Florence Pugh as Katherine Lester
- Naomi Ackie as Anna
- Cosmo Jarvis as Sebastian
- Paul Hilton as Alexander Lester
- Christopher Fairbank as Boris Lester
- Golda Rosheuvel as Agnes
- Anton Palmer as Teddy
- Fleur Houdijk as the younger maid Tessa
- Rebecca Manley as the cook Mary
- Bill Fellows as doctor Burdon
- Cliff Burnett as the priest Father Peter
- Nicholas Lumley as Mr. Robertson
- Raymond Finn as Mr. Kirkbride
- Ian Conningham as detective Logan

== Production ==
=== Development ===
Playwright Alice Birch shared the 1865 novella Lady Macbeth of the Mtsensk District by Nikolai Leskov with theatre director William Oldroyd. Creative England, BBC Films and the British Film Institute supported the iFeatures scheme to fund emerging talent making regional stories into low-budget features. Birch and Oldroyd pitched a story based on the novella to iFeatures. They received a micro budget for the first iFeatures period drama, and made the film for between US$440 and 650 thousand. Lady Macbeth is the debut feature film for writer Birch, director Oldroyd, and producer Fodhla Cronin O'Reilly.

=== Pre-production ===
Set in 1865, Birch's screenplay moved the first part of the novella from a house in the town of Mtsensk, European Russia to a rural estate in Northumberland, England. Oldroyd knew the region from his time at university in neighbouring County Durham. It had period country houses, built with the proceeds of mining the Durham and Northumberland Coalfields, and rural landscapes that could still pass for the 19th century.

In the novella and the screenplay, Lady Macbeth commits three murders in her family's house then her lover confesses his part in the crimes and accuses her. The key difference between the novella and the screenplay is her response. In the novella, Lady Macbeth chooses to remain with her working-class lover by confessing then the story continues with their lives as convicts. While in the screenplay, Katherine Lester as Lady Macbeth chooses to remain a member of the landed gentry by framing her lover Sebastian and her maid Anna then the story ends. This meant the screenplay was set in one location: the Lester estate. Oldroyd's summary of the approach was "By focusing on a few people in one location who don’t change their clothes very often we could direct all our energy towards the story and realise a radical drama that just happened to be set in the past."

Oldroyd's research suggested that the region was more racially diverse in the 19th century than is generally believed today. He shared the view that all-white casts typical of British period dramas had reinforced this belief. Oldroyd and casting director Shaheen Baig took a colour-blind approach. In her second feature film and first lead role, Florence Pugh plays Katherine Lester. Naomi Ackie and Cosmo Jarvis make their feature debuts as Anna and Sebastian. Older and more established actors Paul Hilton and Christopher Fairbank play Alexander and Boris Lester. The landed gentry roles of the Lesters are played by white actors. But the successors to the male Lesters, murdered by Katherine, are played by actors of colour, who led the supporting cast: the established Golda Rosheuvel as Agnes and in his feature debut Anton Palmer as Teddy. The diversity continues in actors playing the principal servant roles: Ackie and Jarvis.

The Lady Macbeth crew included director of photography Ari Wegner, production designer Jacqueline Abrahams, costume designer Holly Waddington and editor Nick Emerson. The principal location was Lambton Castle, County Durham as the Lester estate. (Note: The Lambton family built their castle in the Durham Coalfield partly with the proceeds of coal mining.) The film is largely set in the Lesters's house where the principal interiors are Katherine and Alexander's bedroom, the drawing room with a breakfast table and sofa, and the wood panelled dining room. To reflect the austere nature of house owner Boris Lester, the interiors were sparsely furnished with walls painted in cold period colours. According to Oldroyd, the production design was influenced by pared-back interiors and solitary people lit by cool daylight in the paintings of Danish artist Vilhelm Hammershøi (1864–1916). Lambton Castle has similar daylight; both County Durham and Southern Denmark are close to the 55th parallel north.

=== Filming ===
In September–October 2015, the Lady Macbeth screenplay was filmed chronologically in 24 days: one day at a moorland location and the rest at the principal location Lambton Castle. At the castle, director William Oldroyd and director of photography Ari Wegner worked alongside editor Nick Emerson. Wegner relied on natural light for indoor scenes by day. She mostly used the in-one method to record scenes with wide master shots, which minimised the need for further coverage.

Florence Pugh as Katherine Lester is on-screen for most of the film. She alternates between feeling constrained by other characters, particularly the Lester men, and feeling more relaxed, when she is walking around the estate or with her lover. Oldroyd and Wegner reflected Katherine's state of mind with camerawork. When constrained, the camera was locked to give a static frame around Katherine, while when relaxed, the camera was handheld and the frame moved with her. To reflect how the Lester men regarded Katherine as their property, the wide master shot with static frame was used indoors to create formal compositions of her and other belongings including a vase, a grandfather clock and the sofa.

Emerson generally cut scenes slightly shorter than a viewer might expect to keep the story moving. The two exceptions were violent acts by Katherine leading to death: shooting Alexander's horse and smothering Teddy. Each act plays out in one continuous shot, a wide master with static frame, to make it more confronting for the viewer. Wegner said this approach was influenced by the films of Michael Haneke.

=== Post-production ===
The sound designers were Dan Jones and Ben Baird. They created an expressionist soundscape from recordings of people in the house and nature on the estate, which plays unnaturally loud in the film. The only music is an eerie theme, composed by Jones, which plays in the aftermath of Boris and Alexander's murders and from Anna remaining mute under questioning, following Teddy's murder, to the end of the film.

== Release ==
Lady Macbeth had its world premiere at the Toronto International Film Festival on 9 September 2016. The film first went on general release in April 2017: initially in the Netherlands on the 13th and later in the United Kingdom on the 28th where it was supported by Altitude Film Distribution. It was released in the United States on 14 July 2017 by Roadside Attractions. In November 2017, director William Oldroyd summed up the response to Lady Macbeth as "... enormously good ..." and continued "People have found it to be what we’d hoped we were making, which was a different sort of period drama." Lady Macbeth has grossed US$6.4 million worldwide.

== Reception ==
=== Critical response ===
On Rotten Tomatoes, Lady Macbeth has an approval rating of 89% based on 197 reviews. Letterboxd users rate the film as 3.4 out of five stars based on 85 reviews. On Metacritic, opinion on Lady Macbeth is generally favourable based on 61 user reviews. The film also received positive responses from professional film critics. Peter Bradshaw of The Guardian newspaper gave it a maximum five stars. Cath Clarke writing in Time Out magazine and Mark Kermode in The Observer newspaper awarded the film four of five stars, while Christy Lemire gave it three of four stars on the Roger Ebert website. Although Guy Lodge did not give a rating in Variety magazine, he wrote "An impressively stark, narratively ruthless Victorian chamber piece that feels about as modern as its crinolines will permit, [director] William Oldroyd's pristine debut feature slowly reveals a violent moral ambiguity that needles the mind far longer than its polite period-piece trappings suggest."

The final cut of Lady Macbeth is 89 minutes long, and Florence Pugh as Katherine Lester is on-screen for 90% of the running time. All five critics and Rotten Tomatoes praised her performance. Kermode wrote, "Here Pugh walks a tightrope between audience sympathy and revulsion, a dramatic balancing act that she pulls off with aplomb," and Lemire agreed. The critics, except Clarke, also praised the performance of Naomi Ackie as Anna. Lemire contrasted the two actors with "As showy as Pugh's performance is externally, Ackie does just as much mostly wordlessly with just her eyes and her presence, especially as the situation grows more extreme." These are generally regarded as Pugh and Ackie's breakthrough roles.

The critics, except Lemire, said the racially diverse casting of Lady Macbeth adds to the drama and continues a trend in British period features which includes the 2011 film Wuthering Heights directed by Andrea Arnold (also starring Paul Hilton) and the 2013 film Belle by Amma Asante. Bradshaw wrote "[Lady Macbeth] does an awful lot with a limited budget.", and Kermode agreed.

According to Clarke and Lodge, Lady Macbeth is a feminist cautionary tale. However, in a 2018 thematic analysis, Desirée de Jesus wrote that classifying the film as feminist because Katherine Lester rids herself of the patriarchy was simplistic. According to de Jesus, the oppression experienced by each character in Lady Macbeth depended on the intersection of their gender, class and race.

=== Accolades ===
Award	Date of ceremony	Category	Recipient	Result	Ref.
Les Arcs European Film Festival	16 December 2016	Cineuropa Award	Lady Macbeth	Won	
European Film Awards	9 December 2017	European Discovery / Prix FIPRESCI	Lady Macbeth	Won	
European Film Awards	9 December 2017	Feature Film Selection	Lady Macbeth	Shortlisted	
European Film Awards	9 December 2017	European Actress	Florence Pugh	Nominated	
British Independent Film Awards	10 December 2017	Best British Independent Film	Lady Macbeth	Nominated	
British Independent Film Awards	10 December 2017	Best Director	William Oldroyd	Nominated	
British Independent Film Awards	10 December 2017	The Douglas Hickox Award (Debut Director)	William Oldroyd	Nominated	
British Independent Film Awards	10 December 2017	Best Actress	Florence Pugh	Won	
British Independent Film Awards	10 December 2017	Best Supporting Actress	Naomi Ackie	Nominated	
British Independent Film Awards	10 December 2017	Most Promising Newcomer	Naomi Ackie	Won	
British Independent Film Awards	10 December 2017	Most Promising Newcomer	Cosmo Jarvis	Nominated	
British Independent Film Awards	10 December 2017	Best Screenplay	Alice Birch	Won	
British Independent Film Awards	10 December 2017	Best Debut Screenwriter	Alice Birch	Nominated	
British Independent Film Awards	10 December 2017	Breakthrough Producer	Fodhla Cronin O'Reilly	Nominated	
British Independent Film Awards	10 December 2017	Best Casting	Shaheen Baig	Nominated	
British Independent Film Awards	10 December 2017	Best Cinematography	Ari Wegner	Won	
British Independent Film Awards	10 December 2017	Best Costume Design	Holly Waddington	Won	
British Independent Film Awards	10 December 2017	Best Make-up and Hair Design	Sian Wilson	Nominated	
British Independent Film Awards	10 December 2017	Best Production Design	Jacqueline Abrahams	Nominated	
British Academy Film Awards	18 February 2018	BAFTA Award for Outstanding Debut by a British Writer, Director or Producer	Lady Macbeth	Nominated	
British Academy Film Awards	18 February 2018	Outstanding British Film	Lady Macbeth	Nominated	
Independent Spirit Awards	3 March 2018	Best International Film (awarded to the director)	William Oldroyd	Nominated	
