= William Oldroyd =

English filmmaker

William Oldroyd is a British film and theatre director.

== Life and career ==
Originally from Guildford, Surrey, he worked in theatre and directed short films before making his feature debut with Lady Macbeth in 2016. The film debuted in the Platform Prize program at the 2016 Toronto International Film Festival. His second feature film, Eileen, followed in 2023. In 2025, Oldroyd was appointed the jury of the Progressive Cinema Competition at the 20th Rome Film Festival.

== Filmography ==
=== Short film ===
- Christ's Dog (2011)
- In Mid Wickedness (2013)
- Best (2014)

=== Feature film ===
- Lady Macbeth (2016)
- Eileen (2023)

=== Television series ===
- His & Hers (2026)

== Awards ==
Award	Date of ceremony	Category	Work	Result	Ref.
British Academy Film Awards	2018	Outstanding British Film	Lady Macbeth	Nominated	
British Academy Film Awards	2018	Outstanding Debut by a British Writer, Director or Producer	Lady Macbeth	Nominated	
British Independent Film Awards	2017	Best Director	Lady Macbeth	Nominated	
British Independent Film Awards	2017	Best British Independent Film	Lady Macbeth	Nominated	
British Independent Film Awards	2017	Douglas Hickox Award	Lady Macbeth	Nominated	
Directors Guild of America	2017	Outstanding Directing – First-Time Feature Film	Lady Macbeth	Nominated	
European Film Awards	2017	European Discovery of the Year	Lady Macbeth	Won	
Goya Awards	2017	Best European Film	Lady Macbeth	Nominated	
Independent Spirit Awards	2017	Best International Film	Lady Macbeth	Nominated	
Independent Spirit Awards	2024	Best Director	Eileen	Nominated	
London Film Critics' Circle	2017	Philip French Award for Breakthrough British/Irish Filmmaker	Lady Macbeth	Nominated	
Toronto Film Critics Association	2017	Best First Feature	Lady Macbeth	Nominated	
Toronto International Film Festival	2016	Platform Prize	Lady Macbeth	Nominated	
