= Francis Lee (director) =

English filmmaker (born 1969)

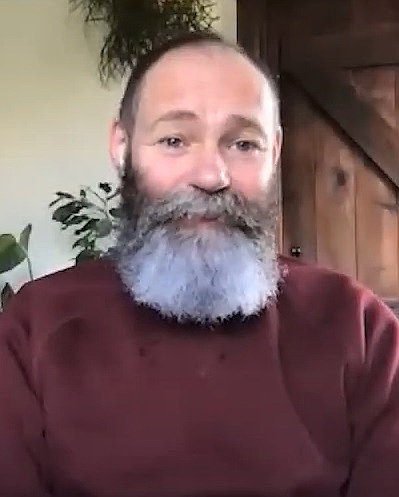
- Francis Lee in 2021
- Born: April 2, 1969 (age 57); Soyland, Calderdale, West Yorkshire, England, UK
- Occupations: Film director, screenwriter, actor
- Years active: 1994–present
- Known for: God's Own Country; Ammonite

Francis Lee (born 1969) is an English filmmaker known for his debut feature film, God's Own Country (2017), which won the World Cinema Directing Award at the 2017 Sundance Film, and subsequent film, Ammonite (2020).

== Life and career ==
Francis Lee grew up on his family's farm in Soyland, Calderdale, West Yorkshire. After finishing school, he studied acting at the Rose Bruford College and worked in the theatre afterwards. Lee first appeared on television in 1994 in Peak Practice, which was followed by guest roles in television series like Midsomer Murders, Heartbeat and Casualty. In cinema, he had small roles in Mike Leigh's Topsy-Turvy (1999) and in Sandra Goldbacher's Me Without You (2001).

Although working as a director today, he never trained at a film school. In the 2000s, Lee lost interest in acting and wanted to tell his own stories. While working at a scrapyard, he made his directing debut with the short film The Farmer's Wife (2012), followed by the short films Bradford Halifax London (2013) and The Last Smallholder (2014).

He had his breakthrough with the 2017 film God's Own Country, which received critical acclaim. He won prizes at the Sundance Film Festival and the Teddy Awards, the Breakthrough director award at the London Film Critics' Circle and the BAFTA Award for Best Debut Screenwriter.

Lee directed Ammonite, which was released in September 2020 and stars Kate Winslet and Saoirse Ronan as 19th century British palaeontologist Mary Anning and geologist Charlotte Murchison. The film centres on a speculative romantic relationship between the two.

In 2021 he stated that he's working on an upcoming horror film that explores themes of "class and queerness".

He divides his time between Yorkshire and London.

== Filmography ==
Year	Film	Credited as		Notes
Year	Film	Director	Writer	Notes
2012	The Farmer's Wife	Yes	Yes	Short film
2013	Bradford Halifax London	Yes	Yes	Short film
2014	The Last Smallholder	Yes	Yes	Short film
2017	God's Own Country	Yes	Yes	Feature debut
2020	Ammonite	Yes	Yes	
