= List of Line of Duty episodes =

Line of Duty title card

Line of Duty is a British police procedural and serial drama television series created and written by Jed Mercurio for the British Broadcasting Corporation (BBC). Mercurio originally pitched the programme to BBC One, but was turned down and directed towards BBC Two, which commissioned the series nine months later. It premiered on 26 June 2012 with a five-episode first series which concluded on 24 July. The programme performed well and quickly earned a commission for a second series. The six-episode second series aired from 2 February to 19 March 2014. Although viewing figures were slightly lower than the first, BBC Two commissioned a third and fourth series of the programme. The third began broadcasting on 24 March 2016 and finished six weeks later on 28 April. Series three surpassed the viewership of the first series and was the most viewed series on BBC Two in over ten years, leading to the commissioning of a fifth series.

Around the time of the commissioning of the new series, a restructuring of BBC television networks occurred, causing ownership over BBC One and BBC Two to become consolidated under Charlotte Moore. Following these changes, the decision was made to promote Line of Duty to BBC One for the fourth series onwards. Series four aired from 26 March to 30 April 2017 followed by the fifth from 31 March to 5 May 2019. Following the fourth, the programme was also commissioned for series six. A special mini-episode written by the Dawson Brothers aired on 13 March 2020 in support of Sport Relief. An additional episode was produced for the sixth series of the show; it began airing on 21 March 2021 with its finale being broadcast on 2 May. A seventh series was commissioned in 2025 for broadcast in 2027. Viewing figures increased significantly over the course of the series, leading to record breaking broadcasts and causing Line of Duty to become the highest-rated drama since modern records began in 2002. The series has since been the subject of critical acclaim, receiving nominations for several awards and gaining a large cult following.

The series primarily follows the actions of Anti-Corruption Unit 12 (AC-12), a task force located within the fictional Central Police Constabulary. AC-12 is led by Superintendent Ted Hastings, portrayed by Adrian Dunbar. Martin Compston and Vicky McClure also starred in all six series as AC-12 officers Steve Arnott and Kate Fleming, respectively. Each series features an additional actor who portrays a police officer that is being investigated by AC-12. These roles were performed by Lennie James, Keeley Hawes, Daniel Mays, Thandie Newton, Stephen Graham, and Kelly Macdonald. Other starring cast members include Craig Parkinson, Jessica Raine, Jason Watkins, and Anna Maxwell Martin. Over the course of the programme, an overarching storyline develops that connects numerous characters to an organised crime group which is found to be involved in a large conspiracy with high-ranking officers of the police department. Produced by World Productions, the series was primarily filmed in Belfast although filming for the first series took place in Birmingham. It was distributed internationally by Content Media Group, which was eventually purchased by Kew Media Distribution, and ultimately ITV Studios following Kew Media's collapse.

During the course of the programme, 36 episodes of Line of Duty aired over six series, between 26 June 2012 and 2 May 2021.

== Series overview ==
Line of Duty series overview
Series	Episodes	Originally released			Average viewership (in millions)
Series	Episodes	First released	Last released	Network	Average viewership (in millions)
1	5	26 June 2012	24 July 2012	BBC Two	3.80
2	6	12 February 2014	19 March 2014	BBC Two	3.43
3	6	24 March 2016	28 April 2016	BBC Two	4.81
4	6	26 March 2017	30 April 2017	BBC One	8.24
5	6	31 March 2019	5 May 2019	BBC One	11.10
Sport Relief special		13 March 2020		BBC One	—N/a
6	7	21 March 2021	2 May 2021	BBC One	13.67
7	6	2027	2027	BBC One	TBA

== Episodes ==
=== Series 1 (2012) ===
Line of Duty series 1 episodes
No. overall	No. in series	Title	Directed by	Written by	Original release date	UK viewers (millions)
1	1	"Episode 1" "A Disastrous Affair"	David Caffrey	Jed Mercurio	26 June 2012	3.76
2	2	"Episode 2" "The Assault"	David Caffrey	Jed Mercurio	3 July 2012	3.84
3	3	"Episode 3" "In the Trap"	David Caffrey	Jed Mercurio	10 July 2012	3.80
4	4	"Episode 4" "Terror"	Douglas Mackinnon	Jed Mercurio	17 July 2012	3.87
5	5	"Episode 5" "The Probation"	Douglas Mackinnon	Jed Mercurio	24 July 2012	3.72

=== Series 2 (2014) ===
Line of Duty series 2 episodes
No. overall	No. in series	Title	Directed by	Written by	Original release date	UK viewers (millions)
6	1	"Episode 1" "The Ambush"	Douglas Mackinnon	Jed Mercurio	12 February 2014	2.74
7	2	"Episode 2" "Carly"	Douglas Mackinnon	Jed Mercurio	19 February 2014	3.21
8	3	"Episode 3" "Behind Bars"	Douglas Mackinnon	Jed Mercurio	26 February 2014	3.34
9	4	"Episode 4" "Blood Money"	Daniel Nettheim	Jed Mercurio	5 March 2014	3.46
10	5	"Episode 5" "Last Words"	Daniel Nettheim	Jed Mercurio	12 March 2014	3.73
11	6	"Episode 6" "The Caddy"	Daniel Nettheim	Jed Mercurio	19 March 2014	4.12

=== Series 3 (2016) ===
Line of Duty series 3 episodes
No. overall	No. in series	Title	Directed by	Written by	Original release date	UK viewers (millions)
12	1	"Episode 1" "Monsters"	Michael Keillor	Jed Mercurio	24 March 2016	3.31
13	2	"Episode 2" "The Process"	Michael Keillor	Jed Mercurio	31 March 2016	5.11
14	3	"Episode 3" "Snake Pit"	Michael Keillor	Jed Mercurio	7 April 2016	4.97
15	4	"Episode 4" "Negative Pressure"	John Strickland	Jed Mercurio	14 April 2016	4.82
16	5	"Episode 5" "The List"	John Strickland	Jed Mercurio	21 April 2016	5.09
17	6	"Episode 6" "Breach"	John Strickland	Jed Mercurio	28 April 2016	5.58

=== Series 4 (2017) ===
Line of Duty series 4 episodes
No. overall	No. in series	Title	Directed by	Written by	Original release date	UK viewers (millions)
18	1	"Episode 1" "In the Shadow of Truth"	Jed Mercurio	Jed Mercurio	26 March 2017	7.40
19	2	"Episode 2" "Who Sows the Wind"	Jed Mercurio	Jed Mercurio	2 April 2017	7.26
20	3	"Episode 3" "In the Trap"	John Strickland	Jed Mercurio	9 April 2017	7.37
21	4	"Episode 4" "Moral Superiority"	John Strickland	Jed Mercurio	16 April 2017	8.48
22	5	"Episode 5" "Lying Nest"	John Strickland	Jed Mercurio	23 April 2017	9.03
23	6	"Episode 6" "Royal Hunting Ground"	John Strickland	Jed Mercurio	30 April 2017	9.92

=== Series 5 (2019) ===
Line of Duty series 5 episodes
No. overall	No. in series	Title	Directed by	Written by	Original release date	UK viewers (millions)
24	1	"Episode 1" "Operation Pear Tree"	John Strickland	Jed Mercurio	31 March 2019	11.37
25	2	"Episode 2" "The Head of Medusa"	John Strickland	Jed Mercurio	7 April 2019	10.30
26	3	"Episode 3" "Code Zero"	John Strickland	Jed Mercurio	14 April 2019	10.34
27	4	"Episode 4" "The Betrayal"	John Strickland	Jed Mercurio	21 April 2019	10.46
28	5	"Episode 5" "On Your Own"	Sue Tully	Jed Mercurio	28 April 2019	11.42
29	6	"Episode 6" "The Intrigue"	Sue Tully	Jed Mercurio	5 May 2019	12.69

=== Sport Relief special (2020) ===
Line of Duty Sport Relief special episode
Title	Written by	Original release date
"Line of Duty Sport Relief Special"	Dawson Brothers	13 March 2020

=== Series 6 (2021) ===
Line of Duty series 6 episodes
No. overall	No. in series	Title	Directed by	Written by	Original release date	UK viewers (millions)
30	1	"Episode 1"	Daniel Nettheim	Jed Mercurio	21 March 2021	13.49
31	2	"Episode 2"	Daniel Nettheim	Jed Mercurio	28 March 2021	12.45
32	3	"Episode 3"	Gareth Bryn	Jed Mercurio	4 April 2021	12.58
33	4	"Episode 4"	Gareth Bryn	Jed Mercurio	11 April 2021	12.77
34	5	"Episode 5"	Jennie Darnell	Jed Mercurio	18 April 2021	13.72
35	6	"Episode 6"	Jennie Darnell	Jed Mercurio	25 April 2021	14.89
36	7	"Episode 7"	Jennie Darnell	Jed Mercurio	2 May 2021	15.79

=== Series 7 ===
Line of Duty series 6 episodes
No. overall	No. in series	Title	Directed by	Written by	Original release date	UK viewers (millions)
37	1	"Episode 1"	Jennie Darnell	Jed Mercurio	2027	TBD
38	2	"Episode 2"	Jennie Darnell	Jed Mercurio	2027	TBD
39	3	"Episode 3"	Jennie Darnell	Jed Mercurio	2027	TBD
40	4	"Episode 4"	Jed Mercurio	Jed Mercurio	2027	TBD
41	5	"Episode 5"	Jed Mercurio	Jed Mercurio	2027	TBD
42	6	"Episode 6"	Jed Mercurio	Jed Mercurio	2027	TBD

== Viewing figures ==
Line of Duty : UK viewers per episode (millions)

Series	Episode number							Average
Series	1	2	3	4	5	6	7	Average
1	3.76	3.84	3.80	3.87	3.72	–		3.80
2	2.74	3.21	3.34	3.46	3.73	4.12	–	3.43
3	3.31	5.11	4.97	4.82	5.09	5.58	–	4.81
4	7.40	7.26	7.37	8.48	9.03	9.92	–	8.24
5	11.37	10.30	10.34	10.46	11.42	12.69	–	11.10
6	13.49	12.45	12.58	12.77	13.72	14.89	15.79	13.67
7	TBD	TBD	TBD	TBD	TBD	TBD	–	TBD

Audience measurement performed by Broadcasters' Audience Research Board
