= Line of Duty =

British police procedural drama television series (2012–present)

- Genre: Police procedural; Serial drama
- Created by: Jed Mercurio
- Showrunner: Jed Mercurio
- Written by: Jed Mercurio
- Starring: Lennie James; Martin Compston; Vicky McClure; Keeley Hawes; Adrian Dunbar; Jessica Raine; Craig Parkinson; Daniel Mays; Thandie Newton; Jason Watkins; Stephen Graham; Anna Maxwell Martin; Kelly Macdonald
- Theme music composer: Carly Paradis
- Opening theme: Line of Duty Opening Title Theme
- Ending theme: Line of Duty End Title Theme
- Composer: Carly Paradis
- Country of origin: United Kingdom
- Original language: English
- No. of series: 6
- No. of episodes: 36 (list of episodes)

Production
- Executive producers: Simon Heath; Stephen Wright; Jed Mercurio; Tommy Bulfin
- Producers: Jed Mercurio; Peter Norris; Cait Collins; Ken Horn
- Production locations: Birmingham; Belfast
- Cinematography: Ruairi O'Brien; Peter Robertson; Anna Valdez Hanks; Stephen Murphy; Tim Palmer; Ray Carlin
- Editors: Andrew McClelland; Steve Singleton; David Blackmore; Dominic Strevens
- Running time: 57–88 minutes
- Production companies: World Productions; ITV Studios

Original release
- Network: BBC Two
- Release: 26 June 2012 – 28 April 2016
- Network: BBC One
- Release: 26 March 2017 – present

Line of Duty is a British police procedural and serial drama television programme created by Jed Mercurio and produced by World Productions for the British Broadcasting Corporation (BBC). It began broadcasting on BBC Two on 26 June 2012. The programme performed well and was quickly commissioned for additional series that aired in 2014 and 2016. After becoming the highest-rated series on BBC Two in 10 years, Line of Duty was promoted to BBC One, beginning with the fourth series in 2017, the fifth in 2019, and the sixth in 2021. A seventh series is currently in production and is scheduled to air in 2027.

The series stars Martin Compston, Vicky McClure, and Adrian Dunbar, among others. It revolves around Anti-Corruption Unit 12 (AC-12), a team inside a fictional police force tasked with "policing the police". Mercurio originally pitched the series to BBC One in 2011 but was turned down and directed towards BBC Two. After the two networks were restructured, the programme was transferred to BBC One.

Mercurio has written the entirety of the series, directed some episodes, and served as producer and executive producer. Filming of the first series took place in Birmingham, England, before moving to Belfast, Northern Ireland, for the remainder of the programme. Simon Heath, Stephen Wright, and Tommy Bulfin are additional executive producers of the show, which was also produced with Northern Ireland Screen and BBC Northern Ireland.

Line of Duty has secured an international cult following despite complications with international distribution rights. The series has been praised by many critics, although it was criticised by some for its conclusion of a long story arc at the end of series six. It set viewership records and became the highest-rated drama in the UK since 2002. The programme has received several accolades, including multiple nominations for British Academy Television Awards (BAFTA TV).

== Synopsis ==
Line of Duty follows DS Steve Arnott, a former counter-terrorism officer who is transferred to Anti-Corruption Unit 12 (AC-12) after refusing to agree to cover up an unlawful shooting by his own team. At AC-12 Arnott is partnered with DC Kate Fleming, a highly commended undercover officer with a keen investigative instinct. They work under the supervision of Superintendent Ted Hastings, uncovering corruption within the fictional Central Police. Throughout the series, AC-12 investigates seemingly disparate cases involving apparently corrupt police officers such as DCI Tony Gates (series one), DI Lindsay Denton (series two), Sergeant Danny Waldron (series three), DCI Roseanne Huntley (series four), undercover officer DS John Corbett (series five), and DCI Joanne Davidson (series six), among others.

AC-12 realises the pervasive nature of corruption and the police's deep-rooted links to an organised crime group. A long-running story arc revolves around discovering the identity of "H", a corrupt person or persons of senior rank within the police force who are instrumental in running organised crime.

== Cast and characters ==
=== Main ===
Main cast overview for Line of Duty
Name	Portrayed by	Series						
Name	Portrayed by	1	2	3	4	5	6	7
Tony Gates	Lennie James	Main						
Steve Arnott	Martin Compston	Main						
Kate Fleming	Vicky McClure	Main						
Jackie Laverty	Gina McKee	Starring						
Ted Hastings	Adrian Dunbar	Starring	Main					
Matthew "Dot" Cottan	Craig Parkinson	Starring	Main (Note: Only receives main billing in the episodes in which they appear)		Guest			
Jools Gates	Kate Ashfield	Starring						
Derek Hilton	Paul Higgins	Starring			Starring			
Nigel Morton	Neil Morrissey	Starring						
Philip Osborne	Owen Teale	Starring					Starring	
Tommy Hunter	Brian McCardie	Starring						
Lindsay Denton	Keeley Hawes		Main (Note: In series three, Hawes is credited as a guest star in episode 2 and with the main cast in episodes 3–6.)					
Georgia Trotman	Jessica Raine		Main					
Mike Dryden	Mark Bonnar		Starring					Starring
Jo Dwyer	Liz White		Starring					
Lester Hargreaves	Tony Pitts		Starring		Guest	Starring		
Daniel Waldron	Daniel Mays			Main				
Gill Biggeloe	Polly Walker			Starring		Starring		
Rod Kennedy	Will Mellor			Starring				
Hari Bains	Arsher Ali			Starring				
Jackie Brickford	Leanne Best			Starring				
Terry Reynolds	Shaun Parkes			Starring				
Sam Railston	Aiysha Hart			Starring				
Joe Nash	Jonas Armstrong			Starring				
Maneet Bindra	Maya Sondhi			Starring				
Patrick Fairbank	George Costigan			Starring			Starring	
Roz Huntley	Thandie Newton				Main			
Tim Ifield	Jason Watkins				Main (Note: In series five, Watkins is credited with the main cast in episodes 1–2 and as a guest star in episode 5.)			
Nick Huntley	Lee Ingleby				Starring			
Jimmy Lakewell	Patrick Baladi				Starring		Guest	
John Corbett	Stephen Graham					Main (Note: In series six, Graham is credited with the main cast in episodes 1–4 and as a guest star in episode 6.)		
Patricia Carmichael	Anna Maxwell Martin					Main		
Lisa McQueen	Rochenda Sandall					Starring		
Jane Cafferty	Sian Reese-Williams					Starring		
Allison Powell	Susan Vidler					Starring		
Rohan Sindwhani	Ace Bhatti					Starring		
Andrea Wise	Elizabeth Rider					Starring		
Roisin Hastings	Andrea Irvine		Recurring			Starring		
Tatleen Sohota	Taj Atwal					Starring		
Joanne Davidson	Kelly Macdonald						Main	
Farida Jatri	Anneika Rose				Recurring		Starring	
Ian Buckells	Nigel Boyle	Recurring			Recurring		Starring	
Chloë Bishop	Shalom Brune-Franklin						Starring	
Chris Lomax	Perry Fitzpatrick						Starring	
Nicky Rogerson	Christina Chong		Recurring				Starring	
Steph Corbett	Amy De Bhrún					Recurring	Starring	
Haran Nadaraja	Prasanna Puwanarajah						Starring	
Ryan Pilkington	Gregory Piper	Recurring				Recurring	Starring	
Gail Vella	Andi Osho						Starring	
Medical counsellor	Steve Oram						Starring	
Dominic Gough	Tom Weston-Jones							Main
Shaun Massie	Robert Carlyle							Main
Paula Beckman	Laura Aikman							Starring
Luke Tobin	Levi Brown							Starring
Nira Rashid	Amy-Leigh Hickman							Starring

=== Recurring ===
- Claire Keelan as Leah Janson (series 1)
- Fiona Boylan as Karen Larkin (series 1)
- Faraz Ayub as Deepak Kapoor (series 1)
- Alison Lintott as Rita Bennett (series 1)
- Brian Miller as Alf Butterfield (series 1)
- Darren Morfitt as Colin Brackley (series 1)
- Neet Mohan as Simon Bannerjee (series 1)
- Tomi May as Miroslav Minkowicz (series 1, 5)
- Lauren O'Rourke as Keely Pilkington (series 1)
- Elliot Rosen (guest series 1) and Tommy Jessop (series 6, guest series 5) as Terry Boyle
- Steve Toussaint as Mallick (series 2)
- Maria Connolly as Alison Merchant (series 6, guest series 2)
- Henry Pettigrew as Jeremy Cole (series 2)
- Michael Nardone as O'Neill (series 2)
- Niall Macgregor as Richard Akers (series 2)
- Richard Huw as Nick Robson (series 2)
- Sacha Dhawan as Manish Prasad (series 2)
- Charlotte Spencer as Carly Kirk (series 2)
- Lisa Palfrey as Tracey McAndrew (series 3)
- James Edlin as Lambert (series 3)
- Shaun Parkes as Terry Reynolds (series 3)
- Gaite Jansen as Hana Reznikova (series 4)
- Claudia Jessie as Jodie Taylor (series 4)
- Patrick FitzSymons as Mark Moffatt (series 5, guest series 4)
- Mark Stobbart as Neil Twyler (series 4)
- Scott Reid as Michael Farmer (series 4)
- Elva Trill as Gemma Riley (series 4)
- Royce Pierreson as Jamie Desford (series 4)
- Vineeta Rishi as Rupal Pandit (series 4)
- Richard Pepple as Kyle Ferringham (series 5)
- Alastair Natkiel as Lee Banks (series 5, guest series 6)
- Rosa Escoda as Amanda Yao (series 6, guest series 5)

== Episodes ==
Line of Duty series overview
Series	Episodes	Originally released			Average viewership (in millions)
Series	Episodes	First released	Last released	Network	Average viewership (in millions)
1	5	26 June 2012	24 July 2012	BBC Two	3.80
2	6	12 February 2014	19 March 2014	BBC Two	3.43
3	6	24 March 2016	28 April 2016	BBC Two	4.81
4	6	26 March 2017	30 April 2017	BBC One	8.24
5	6	31 March 2019	5 May 2019	BBC One	11.10
Sport Relief special		13 March 2020		BBC One	—N/a
6	7	21 March 2021	2 May 2021	BBC One	13.67
7	6	2027	2027	BBC One	TBA

== Production ==
=== Development ===
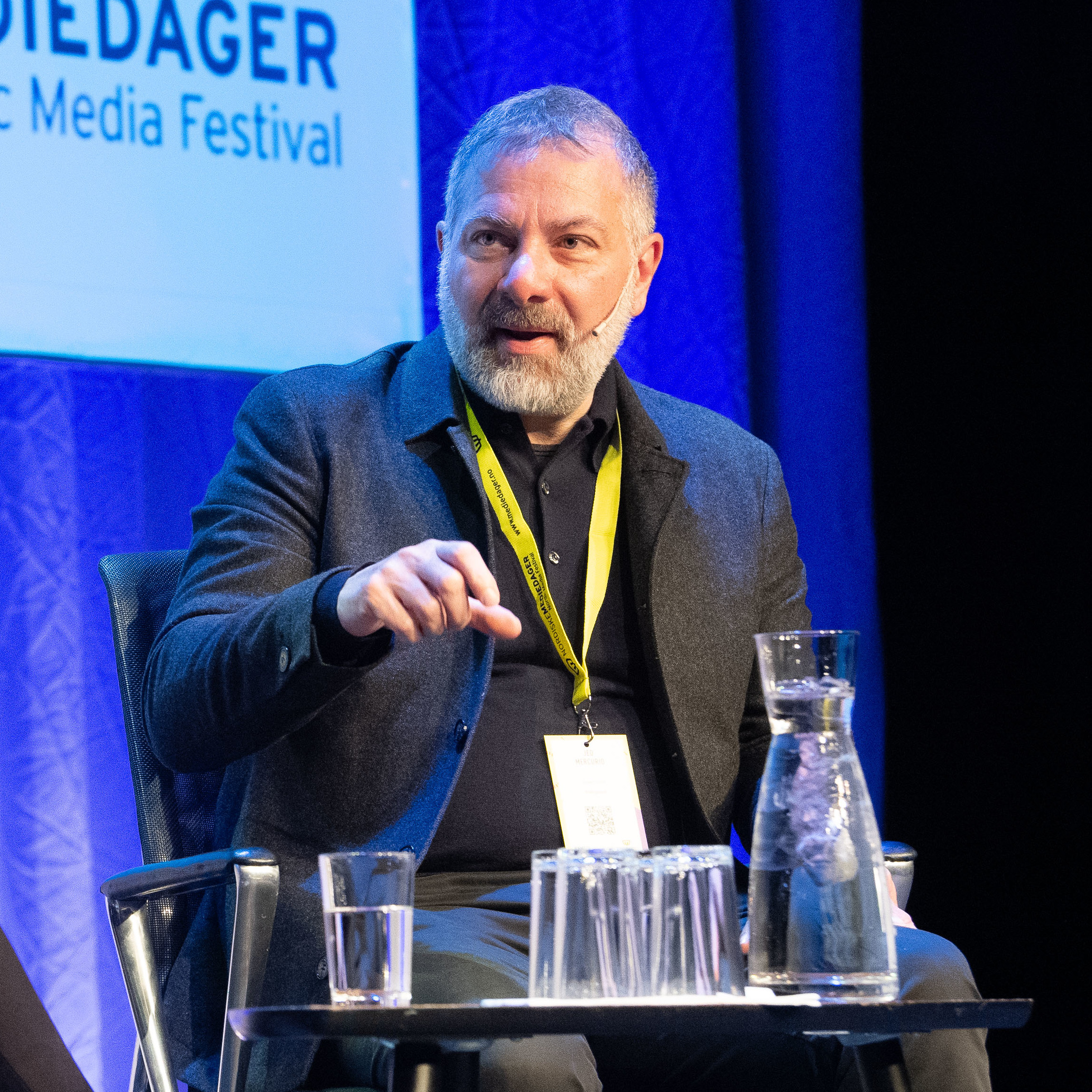
Jed Mercurio created Line of Duty.

Series creator and producer Jed Mercurio stated that he wanted to create something different from other programmes, and viewed the series as a "revisionist commentary on 21st-century policing". The series is produced by World Productions. Mercurio originally pitched it to BBC One, which turned him down, believing it to be too "problematic for a mainstream audience", and directed him toward BBC Two, which commissioned the series nine months later. Mercurio also served as the programme's showrunner. A second series was commissioned by the BBC on 25 July 2012. Mercurio became an executive producer from the second series onwards, alongside Simon Heath for World Productions and Stephen Wright for BBC Northern Ireland. Tommy Bulfin replaced Wright for the fifth and sixth series. A third and fourth series were commissioned in April 2014, followed by a fifth in May 2016. At the time of the fifth series renewal, it was announced that future editions of the programme, including the fourth, would move from BBC Two to BBC One. This decision came after the series's high viewing figures and a restructuring of the networks. Five days after broadcast transmission concluded on the fourth, Line of Duty was commissioned for a sixth series. In 2020, a special mini-episode was produced in support of Sport Relief. The special was promoted as a "deleted scene" from the fifth series and starred Compston, McClure, and Dunbar, along with Jason Isaacs and Lee Mack.

On 18 November 2025, the BBC confirmed a seventh series had been commissioned with Compston, McClure and Dunbar reprising their roles. Filming will commence in Belfast in Spring 2026.

=== Writing ===
A long-running story arc is the unknown identity of "H", a suspected corrupt police officer believed to be the highest connection to the organised crime group. Despite not introducing this storyline until the end of the third series, Mercurio stated that he had crafted it from the beginning and purposefully gave multiple characters names beginning with "H" so he could remake portions of the story if needed. He added that this also allowed him to intentionally mislead viewers. Mercurio wrote many characters to be morally grey so that they would feel more relatable. He attributed this to his belief that the world is "more complicated" than good versus evil. Mercurio also frequently kills off key characters to keep the audience engaged. Some of the storylines have been loosely based on true stories. The opening scene of the programme featured the shooting death of a man mistaken to be a suicide bomber; this was credited to the 2005 police shooting of Jean Charles de Menezes, in which a man was incorrectly believed to be part of bombings in London. Additionally, the story surrounding the Sands View Boys' Home in the third series included references to the Jimmy Savile sexual abuse scandal. The BBC was initially uncomfortable at the mention of Savile and wished to exclude it but was persuaded by Mercurio to keep it. The series six murder of Gail Vella was based on the 2017 assassination of journalist Daphne Caruana Galizia. This series also featured an 18-month time jump from the conclusion of the fifth. Many of the colloquialisms that Hastings uses were inspired by Mercurio's Italian father and Dunbar's Irish dad. Mercurio opted not to incorporate COVID-19 into the programme as four episodes of the sixth series had already been filmed when lockdown, face mask, and social distancing guidelines, were introduced and it would have been too expensive to re-film.

=== Casting ===
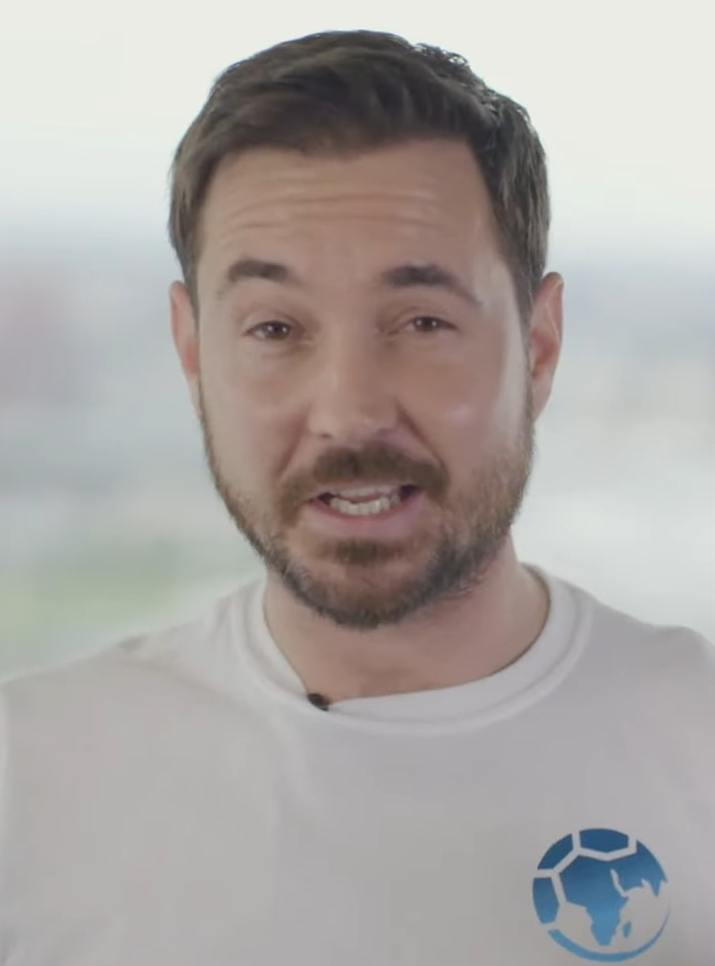
Martin Compston

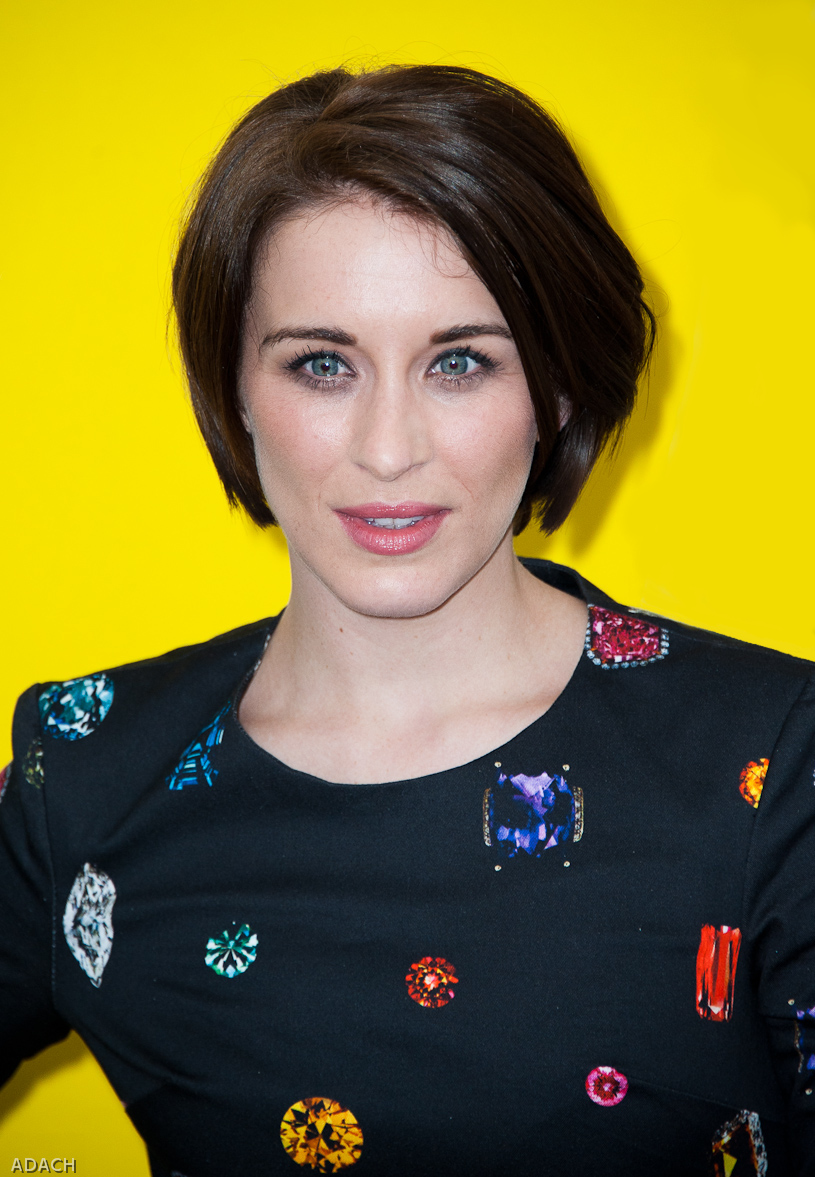
Vicky McClure

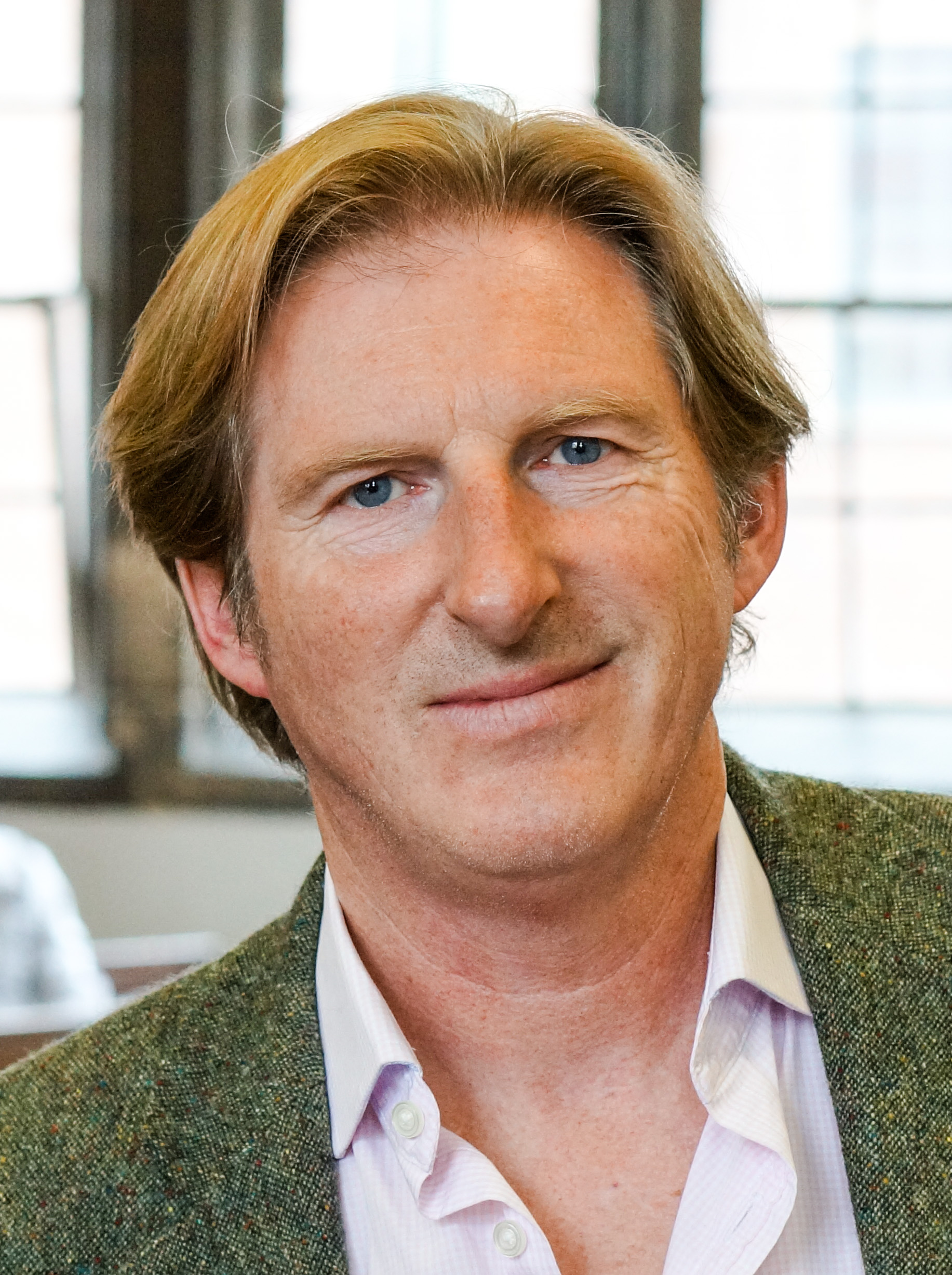
Adrian Dunbar

Compston, McClure, and Dunbar are the only cast members to appear in all six series.

Leading the main cast across all the series are Martin Compston and Vicky McClure, who portray Steve Arnott and Kate Fleming, respectively, two officers in AC-12. Adrian Dunbar also appeared in the first series in a supporting role as Ted Hastings and was promoted to the main cast beginning with the second series. Each series features an additional actor as part of the main cast who portrays a police officer who is being investigated by AC-12. These roles were performed by Lennie James in the first series, Keeley Hawes in the second series, Daniel Mays in the third series, Thandie Newton in the fourth series, Stephen Graham in the fifth series, and Kelly Macdonald in the sixth series. Craig Parkinson also held a supporting role in the first series and joined the main cast for the second and third. Parkinson originally auditioned for the role of Arnott but ultimately portrayed Matthew Cottan. Mercurio also decided to bring Hawes back for the third series as a result of her character's positive reception and made changes to the script. Mercurio killed off both Parkinson's and Hawes's characters at the conclusion of the third series. Despite this, Parkinson filmed new footage for flashback scenes in the fourth and fifth series. Jessica Raine and Jason Watkins each appeared briefly in the second and fourth series, respectively, and were both credited within the main cast. Anna Maxwell Martin was also featured as part of the starring cast in the fifth and sixth series but only appeared in the latter portion of each series. Line of Duty features a large supporting cast of recurring characters and guest stars.

=== Production design ===
Peter Anderson designed Line of Duty's opening title sequence. From series two onwards, Maggie Donnelly worked as the costume designer. She gave Hawes lower-end outfits to reflect "how far [Denton] had sunk in her grief", but also included power suits to show where "she would have been in her career if fate hadn't dealt her that hand". Other outfits included pieces from brands including A.P.C., Marks & Spencer, and Tommy Hilfiger for McClure, Theory for Newton, and ME+EM for both Macdonald and McClure. Compston regularly wears three-piece suits, and his character became notable for the waistcoats. Compston attributed this idea to a friend's experience working in a call centre.

In series six, the Hillside Lane police station was built inside a former school. Gillian Devenney was the series's production designer. She designed Davidson's apartment with "minimalist décor and cool tones" to illustrate it as a lonely place, while Buckells's office was expected to show his "shallowness and lack of commitment to his career". The older design of the police headquarters contrasted with the modern appearance of AC-12's offices. The interrogation room was described as a glass box due to its large windows instead of walls. This room originally existed on location but had to be replicated on a sound stage during the COVID-19 pandemic and was built with no roof to allow for ventilation.

=== Filming ===
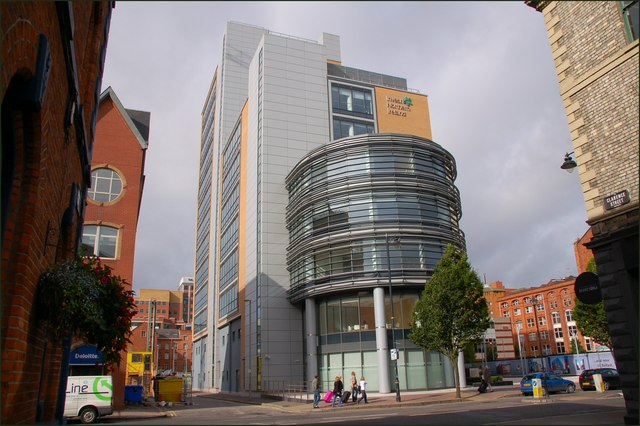
The Invest NI headquarters in Belfast depicts AC-12's headquarters.

Principal photography for the first series began in August 2011. Five hour-long episodes were directed by David Caffrey and Douglas Mackinnon. It was filmed over 11 weeks in Birmingham and utilised two cameras. The setting was later changed to the Midlands on the advice of the BBC. For the second series, filming moved to Belfast and began in mid-2013. The six episodes were split into two filming blocks, with Mackinnon returning to direct the first block of episodes and Daniel Nettheim directing the second. The headquarters of Invest Northern Ireland doubled as Anti-Corruption Unit 12's office building, while the exterior of Belfast Central Library served as the police headquarters' facade.

Filming for the third series began in March 2015. Michael Kellior directed the first three episodes while John Strickland directed the final three. Locations included BT Riverside Tower, McHugh's Bar, and Belfast City Hall. Filming for the fourth series took place from 29 August to 16 December 2016. Mercurio directed the first two episodes of the fourth series, and Strickland returned to direct the final four. Up to 20 hours of footage can be taken to create just 20 minutes of episodic content for the series. The fifth series was directed by Strickland and Sue Tully, with filming occurring between 3 September and 21 December 2018.

For the sixth series, Nettheim returned to direct alongside newcomers Gareth Bryn and Jennie Darnell. Filming began in February 2020 but was halted in March due to the UK's Government response to covid-19 pandemic. It later resumed production in August and concluded on 23 November. Once filming recommenced, changes to scripts were made to allow for social distancing because physical intimacy between performers had to be limited.

=== Music ===
"Line of Duty End Title Theme"
15-second sample of the Line of Duty End Title Theme

Carly Paradis was Line of Duty's composer for incidental music. She credited "Heaven" by Emeli Sandé and the theme song from The X-Files as inspirations for the theme music, stating that she "wanted to touch a little bit on the 1980s, the 1990s and the 2000s, so that it sounds contemporary but still harks back to cop series from the past". The opening and closing themes are designed around a four-note motif. Paradis also said she thought of the words "Line of Duty" when composing the theme.

==== Soundtrack ====
Line of Duty (Music from the Original Series)

Soundtrack album by Carly Paradis
- Released: 1 April 2014
- Length: 45:21

Carly Paradis chronology
Hearts to Symphony (2013)	Line of Duty (Music from the Original Series) (2014)	Nothing Is Something (2019)

A soundtrack album titled Line of Duty (Music from the Original Series) containing tracks from the first two series was released on 1 April 2014.

Line of Duty (Music from the Original Series) track listing
No.	Title	Length
1.	"The Ambush"	4:38
2.	"You're Finished"	0:49
3.	"Gates Goes Home to Kids"	1:42
4.	"The Glass"	1:11
5.	"Jackie You Killed a Man"	2:33
6.	"Fleming Follows"	2:26
7.	"Arnott Searches Online"	1:03
8.	"The Wrong Flat"	2:12
9.	"It's Your Choice Son"	1:51
10.	"Spent Months Sir"	0:36
11.	"Anti-Corruption"	1:36
12.	"Ryan Runs"	1:10
13.	"I Am"	3:13
14.	"Returns for My Eyes Only"	1:03
15.	"In Yer Dreams"	1:41
16.	"Have You Seen Denton"	2:59
17.	"AC12"	1:23
18.	"Masked Drivers"	3:01
19.	"Dryden in Jail"	1:31
20.	"Who Else Was Here"	0:40
21.	"Line of Duty Finale"	3:24
22.	"Line of Duty Opening Title Theme"	1:52
23.	"Line of Duty End Title Theme"	2:35
Total length:		45:21

=== Future ===
Since 2021, there has been interest in producing a seventh series. Mercurio stated that he concluded many of the loose threads during the sixth series, as a seventh had not been commissioned. He also said the BBC was "very supportive" of the series and that "conversations have been very reassuring from the standpoint of not having to wrap things up". Dunbar said in 2022 that he did not expect a full seventh series but anticipated the possibility of a three- to four- part miniseries or two 90-minute episodes. Compston, McClure and Dunbar all expressed interest in returning, if asked. Compston explained that there would only be a seventh series if Mercurio had a story to tell. Later reports suggested a three-episode series was set to air in 2023. In April 2024, Compston confirmed that there were no immediate plans for a seventh series. Series star Christina Chong said in a February 2025 interview that she had been contacted about her availability regarding another series. Two months later, The Sun reported that a seventh series of six episodes had been commissioned, with recording set to begin in January 2026 and transmission expected later that year. In July 2025, Dunbar stated that the show is to return in 2026.

A seventh series was confirmed by the BBC on 18 November 2025, to consist of six episodes.

== Release ==
=== Broadcast and streaming ===
The series was first broadcast on BBC Two beginning on 26 June 2012. Additional series followed in 2014 and 2016. It began airing on BBC One in 2017, with another series in 2019. The final series aired in 2021, concluding on 2 May 2021. The first series was also simulcast on BBC HD, while some series two episodes were simulcast on BBC Two HD. In 2020, series one and two were re-broadcast on BBC One due to COVID-19 filming shutdowns delaying production of series six. In the United Kingdom, the series streams on BBC iPlayer.

Content Media initially handled international distribution of Line of Duty. In the United States, the first four series were initially released on Hulu. They were also added to Acorn TV by 2018. Kew Media Group acquired Content Media in 2017, effectively taking over distribution duties. Acorn TV held exclusive distribution rights for the fifth series within the United States while continuing to share non-exclusive streaming rights to the first four. The first three series were broadcast on the American basic cable television network AMC in 2020. (Note: Acorn TV and AMC are both owned by AMC Networks Inc.) Following Kew Media Group's collapse in 2020, Quiver Entertainment purchased international distribution rights for the first five series, and ITV Studios acquired them for the sixth. Streaming rights for the sixth and any future series were exclusively issued to BritBox in the United States and Canada. In Canada and Australia, the series is available on Netflix and was briefly removed following uncertainty about the streaming rights after the Kew Media Group collapse.

=== Home media ===
Acorn Media distributed home media releases for Line of Duty in the United Kingdom and the United States. The series five DVD set was mistakenly released a day early in some Sainsbury's stores, prior to the series five finale television broadcast. Series six was released on Blu-ray in the United Kingdom on 31 May 2021. A Blu-ray box set of the complete programme was released on 12 July 2021.

Line of Duty home media releases
Title	DVD release dates		Number of episodes	Number of discs
Title	Region 1	Region 2	Number of episodes	Number of discs
Line of Duty - Series One	29 October 2013	3 February 2014	5	2
Line of Duty - Series 2	4 June 2014	24 March 2014	6	2
Line of Duty: Complete Series 1 & 2	—N/a	24 March 2014	11	4
Line of Duty: Series 3	9 August 2016	2 May 2016	6	2 (Note: 3 discs in region one)
Line Of Duty: Series 1-3	—N/a	2 May 2016	17	6
Line of Duty - Series 4	26 September 2017	8 May 2017	6	2
Line of Duty - Series 1-4	—N/a	8 May 2017	23	8
Line of Duty - Series 5	26 November 2019	6 May 2019	6	2
Line of Duty - Series 1-5 (Note: Titled Line of Duty: Series 1-5 Collection in region one)	26 November 2019	6 May 2019	29	10 (Note: 5 discs in region one)
Line of Duty - Series 6	—N/a	31 May 2021	7	2
Line of Duty - Series 1-6 Complete Box Set	—N/a	31 May 2021	36	12

== Reception ==
=== Viewing figures ===
The programme opened to strong viewing figures, with the first series averaging 4.1 million viewers overnight. The second series dipped slightly to a 3.4 million average before rising to 5.1 million for its third. The third series also maintained a 19.3% share. By the time the third series had concluded airing, Line of Duty was the highest-rated series to air on BBC Two since 2002. The fifth series was considered to be the "biggest show of 2019", drawing in 7.8 million in its premiere, up 2.8 million from the fourth. The sixth series averaged 9.9 million viewers in overnight data and maintained a 46.1% share. The finale peaked at 13.1 million with a 15.8% share in its final 15 minutes. This made the programme the highest-rated drama since records began in 2002.

=== Critical response ===
Critical response of Line of Duty
Series	Rotten Tomatoes	Metacritic
1	100% (6 reviews)	83 (4 reviews)
2	100% (6 reviews)	—N/a
3	100% (8 reviews)	—N/a
4	100% (16 reviews)	—N/a
5	90% (29 reviews)	88 (5 reviews)
6	86% (22 reviews)	85 (5 reviews)
Overall	96% (87 reviews)	86 (14 reviews)

On the review aggregator website Rotten Tomatoes, 96% of critics' reviews are positive. Metacritic, which uses a weighted average, assigned the series a score of 86 out of 100, based on 14 critics, indicating "universal acclaim". The first three series are often considered by critics to have been significantly better than the last three. It is considered to have a large cult following. A commonly cited strength of the programme is that along with its regular cast, each series revolves around a different guest lead. The programme has also been praised for its interrogation scenes. The segments, which have taken up as much as 46 minutes of an episode, are often credited with being the most intense moments of the series. The ending of a long-running story arc regarding the true identity of "H" was met with mixed reviews.

=== Awards and nominations ===
Over the course of the series, Line of Duty has won multiple awards and been nominated for several others. Most notably, the programme picked up nominations for several BAFTA awards, such as "Best Drama Series", at the 2015 and 2018 award ceremonies. Additionally, cast members McClure, Dunbar, Hawes, Newton, Macdonald, Mays, and Bonnar have all been nominated for acting-related accolades. Three scenes on the programme, "Urgent Exit Required", "Huntley's Narrow Escape", and "John Corbett's Death", received consideration for "Virgin TV's Must-See Moment". Composer Carly Paradis and director Andrew John McClelland have both been nominated for BAFTA Craft awards for their work on the show. Actors Graham and Compston have won Broadcasting Press Guild and TV Choice Awards. Each individual series of the programme has been nominated for "Best Drama Series" at Royal Television Society-related awards programmes, four of which were won across three series. (Note: Series two of Line of Duty won in both the main award programme as well as the Northern Ireland awards while series four and five only won once.) Mercurio has also received a number of nominations for his writing on the programme securing wins at the Broadcasting Press Guild Awards and the American Edgar Allan Poe Awards.
