= Line of Duty series 5 =

2019 British television series

Line of Duty
- Series 5
- United Kingdom DVD cover art
- Showrunner: Jed Mercurio
- Starring: Stephen Graham; Martin Compston; Vicky McClure; Adrian Dunbar; Anna Maxwell Martin
- No. of episodes: 6

Release
- Original network: BBC One
- Original release: 31 March – 5 May 2019

Series chronology
- ← Previous; Series 4 Next → Series 6

The fifth series of the British police procedural television programme Line of Duty was broadcast on BBC One between 31 March and 5 May 2019. Following the fourth, it is the second series to air on the channel after the first three series aired on BBC Two.

The series follows Anti-Corruption Unit 12 (AC-12), a fictional law enforcement unit tasked with "policing the police". AC-12 is led by Superintendent Ted Hastings (Adrian Dunbar) who is assisted by his team consisting of DS Steve Arnott (Martin Compston) and DI Kate Fleming (Vicky McClure). Together, they conduct an investigation into an organised crime group led by undercover officer John Corbett (Stephen Graham). Over the course of the case, Hastings himself becomes implicated as a suspect and is scrutinised by DCS Patricia Carmichael (Anna Maxwell Martin).

The series was initially commissioned following the third series. Line of Duty is written by Jed Mercurio, who also serves as an executive producer. The six episodes were directed by John Strickland and Sue Tully. Filming took place in late 2018 with cinematography from Stephen Murphy. The series experienced a significant increase in viewing figures and was nominated for 18 awards, 9 of which were won, and received mostly positive reviews from critics. A sixth series followed in 2021.

== Cast and characters ==
=== Main ===
- Stephen Graham as DS John Corbett / John Clayton (Note: Graham is credited with the main cast in episodes 1–4 and as a guest star in episode six)
- Martin Compston as DS Steve Arnott
- Vicky McClure as DI Kate Fleming
- Adrian Dunbar as Superintendent Ted Hastings
- Anna Maxwell Martin as DCS Patricia Carmichael (Note: Only receives main billing in the episodes in which she appears)

=== Starring ===
- Maya Sondhi as PC Maneet Bindra
- Rochenda Sandall as Lisa McQueen
- Aiysha Hart as DS Sam Railston
- Tony Pitts as DCS Lester Hargreaves
- Sian Reese-Williams as Sergeant Jane Cafferty
- Susan Vidler as DSU Alison Powell
- Polly Walker as Gill Biggeloe
- Ace Bhatti as PCC Rohan Sindwhani
- Elizabeth Rider as DCC Andrea Wise
- Andrea Irvine as Roisin Hastings
- Taj Atwal as PC Tatleen Sohota

=== Recurring ===
- Tomi May as Miroslav Minkowicz
- Alastair Natkiel as Lee Banks
- Amy De Bhrún as Steph Corbett
- Gregory Piper as Ryan Pilkington
- Patrick FitzSymons as Mark Moffatt
- Richard Pepple as Sergeant Kyle Ferringham

=== Guest ===
- Maanuv Thiara as Vihaan Malhotra
- Caroline Koziol as Mariana
- Tommy Jessop as Terry Boyle
- Richard Sutton as PC Bloom
- Rosa Escoda as Amanda Yao
- Laura Elphinstone as DI Michelle Brandyce
- Natalie Gavin as PS Tina Tranter
- Peter De Jersey as Rossport
- Craig Parkinson as DI Matthew "Dot" Cottan

== Episodes ==
Line of Duty series 5 episodes
No. overall	No. in series	Title	Directed by	Written by	Original release date	UK viewers (millions)
24	1	"Episode 1" "Operation Pear Tree"	John Strickland	Jed Mercurio	31 March 2019	11.37
An organised crime group (OCG), including senior members John Clayton and Lisa McQueen, hijack a police convoy transporting seized drugs and kill three armed officers. Sergeant Jane Cafferty survives the attack, drawing suspicion. AC-12 suspect that undercover police may be involved; they speculate that McQueen is the undercover officer because she had the opportunity to kill Cafferty but didn't. PC Maneet Bindra is interviewed by Superintendent Hastings, DS Steve Arnott and DI Kate Fleming, due to her involvement with her cousin, Vihaan Malhotra, in spying on AC-12 and leaking information to the organised crime group for ACC Derek Hilton. In a further attempt to protect Malhotra, she contacts the organised crime group. Clayton accuses her of infiltration and she is killed. AC-12 discover that the undercover officer (UCO) is not McQueen, and is instead DS John Corbett using the alias Clayton.
25	2	"Episode 2" "The Head of Medusa"	John Strickland	Jed Mercurio	7 April 2019	10.30
Lisa McQueen visits Cafferty who is recovering at home and speaks to her in private. Another police leak enables the OCG to carry out a raid led by Corbett on a weapons convoy. Further accusations against Cafferty are raised when Arnott, in the process of investigating her, finds a brown envelope belonging to her with £5,000. Corbett visits Arnott and attempts to convince him that he isn't dirty. Hastings is approached by Mark Moffatt regarding his failed property investment. Moffatt hands him a brown envelope similar to that of Cafferty's. Afterwards, Roisin insists on getting a divorce from Ted. Cafferty admits to giving the OCG information and identifies those who recruited her through photographs.
26	3	"Episode 3" "Code Zero"	John Strickland	Jed Mercurio	14 April 2019	10.34
Fleming and Hastings are shocked when Arnott tells them about his meeting with Corbett, but they decide to move forward with his plan. AC-12 discover the OCG are using flats for sex trafficking. AC-12 conduct raids on a print shop they suspect the OCG is using as a front, as well as the flats. Arnott is informed by Corbett of an upcoming raid at a police storage facility who says that a corrupt senior office will be present. AC-12 decides to stakeout the raid to arrest the officer. However, when an urgent request for backup comes in over the radio, Arnott and other officers split off to assist. They later discover the call was a distraction. This leads Corbett to shoot the senior officer to prevent him from escaping. DCS Hargreaves is revealed as the officer. After learning of Hargreaves death, Corbett flees and uses false identification to get to Roisin.
27	4	"Episode 4" "The Betrayal"	John Strickland	Jed Mercurio	21 April 2019	10.46
Arnott arranges to meet Corbett again, this time backed by armed officers. Corbett admits to attacking Roisin who is now in hospital. Hastings orders Arnott to shoot Corbett, but Arnott refuses. After making Arnott disable his listening device, Corbett reveals the location of an upcoming meeting between the OCG and 'H', a long term suspect of AC-12's, and then escapes. AC-12 and the cybercrime unit impersonate 'H' and make contact with the OCG. Afterwards, the OCG transport a group of women who are to be trafficked. Corbett wants to free the women and believes that McQueen will support him in this. McQueen initially goes along with his plan; however, the OCG kill him after realizing that he is an undercover officer.
28	5	"Episode 5" "On Your Own"	Sue Tully	Jed Mercurio	28 April 2019	11.42
The OCG dump the bodies of Corbett and Jackie Laverty (Note: Laverty's murder was depicted in the first series.), who was killed by the OCG in 2012, which are later found by the police. AC-12's investigation into Operation Pear Tree is suspended. Hastings continues to make contact with the OCG as 'H'. He persuades McQueen and Miroslav Minkowicz that he can sell the items acquired in their raid. Armed officers later catch up with Hastings during his meeting with the OCG. Minkowicz is killed and McQueen is arrested. AC-12 discover that Hastings visited Lee Banks in prison, leading Fleming to raise concerns with senior officers. Hastings is suspended and an investigation into him is opened by DCS Patricia Carmichael who subsequently charges him with conspiracy to murder Corbett.
29	6	"Episode 6" "The Intrigue"	Sue Tully	Jed Mercurio	5 May 2019	12.69
Carmichael and her team continue to question Hastings about the £50,000 they found in his hotel room. Gill Biggeloe sits in on the interview and identifies procedural errors in the search of Hastings's room. This leads Carmichael's team to investigate Hastings's communications data for further evidence. Fleming and Arnott revisit Steph and Powell. They discover that Biggeloe was involved in selecting Corbett for Operation Pear Tree, and talked him into investigating Hastings. Upon interrogating Biggeloe, they realize that she is working for the OCG. Biggeloe texts the OCG for escape, but they are stopped by AC-12. One of Carmichael's team, attempts to stab Biggeloe but is shot by Arnott. Operation Pear Tree is officially closed. Fleming receives a commendation for her investigation. Arnott was commended alongside her after an independent panel clears him in the shooting. McQueen and Biggeloe receive immunity in exchange for providing information about the OCG. Ryan Pilkington joins the police academy. Hastings receives a final written warning and continues to lead AC-12. Moffatt claims in trial that the £50,000 in Hastings's hotel room was only half of the sum. The remaining £50,000 is never found, but Hastings is seen approaching Steph with an envelope.

=== Sport Relief special ===
A special mini-episode was produced in support of Sport Relief in 2020. The special was promoted as a "deleted scene" from the fifth series and starred Compston, McClure, and Dunbar along with Jason Isaacs as DC Taylor and Lee Mack as David Rickman. It was written by the Dawson Brothers and aired on BBC One on 13 March 2020. The plot includes elements of the main programme, but the events of the supplemental episode do not fall within the continuity of Line of Duty.

Line of Duty Sport Relief special episode
Title	Written by	Original release date
"Line of Duty Sport Relief Special"	Dawson Brothers	13 March 2020
Arnott, Fleming, and Hastings, believing they finally know who "H" is, interview DC Taylor hoping to find connections to the organised crime group. Taylor maintains his innocence while being poorly defended by David Rickman, an incompetent legal counsellor. Rickman continuously, but unintentionally, makes Taylor appear guiltier. Rickman eventually tries to get AC-12 to let Taylor go by bribing them. Just as Rickman gives Taylor a plausible alibi, Taylor receives a phone call from "H". Taylor is arrested. After everyone else leaves the interrogation room, Rickman admits out loud to being "H". Fleming returns to collect the interview tape, stating that she forgot to press stop on the recording, incriminating Rickman.

== Production ==
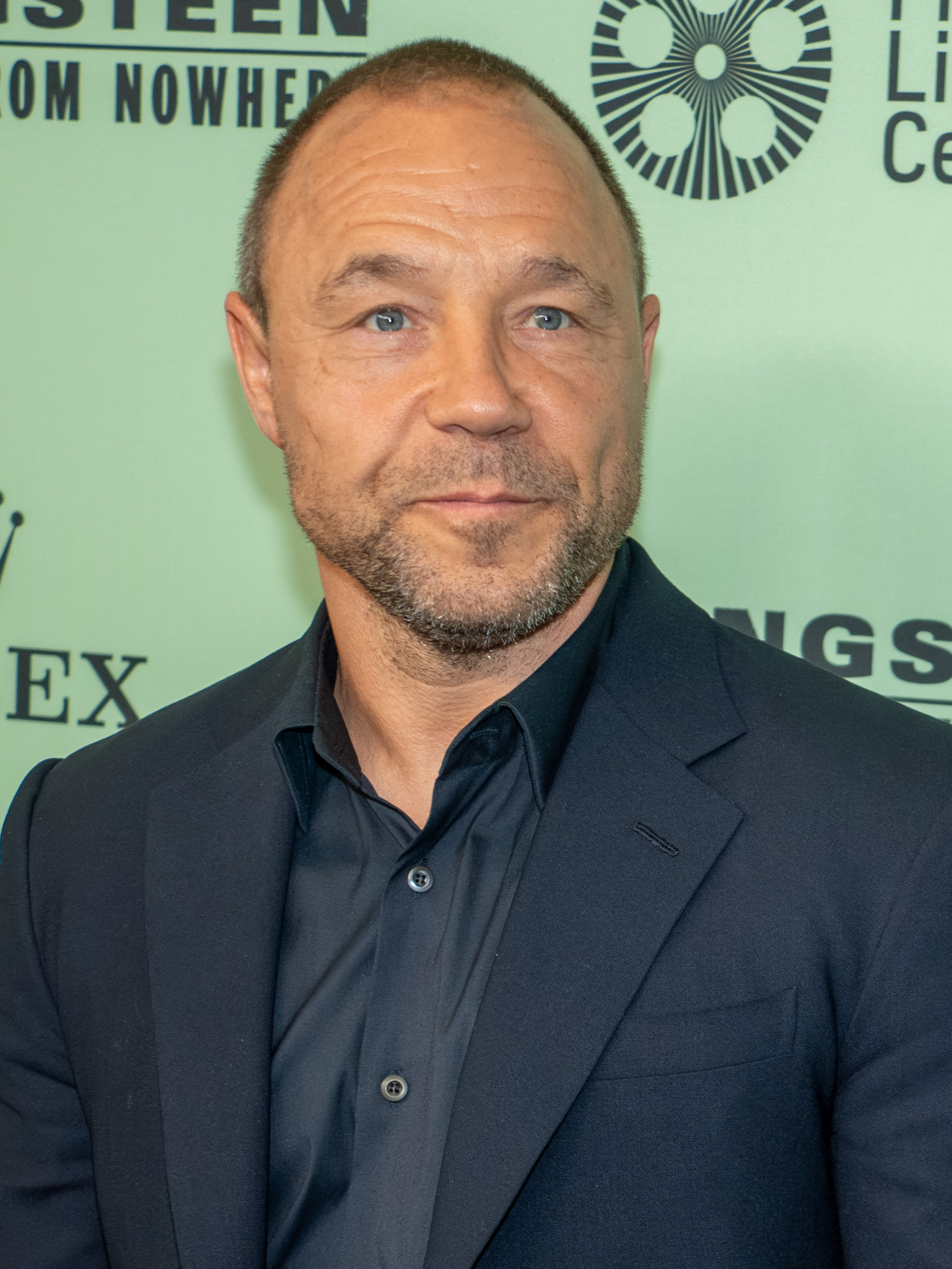
Stephen Graham

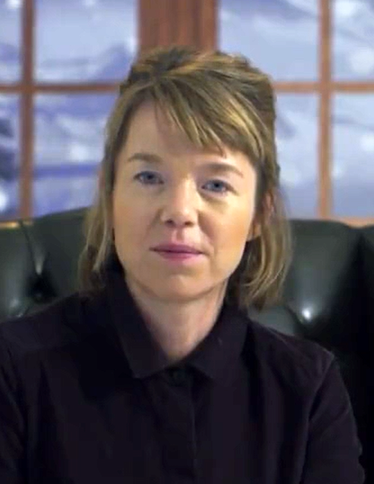
Anna Maxwell Martin

Graham and Maxwell Martin joined the main cast for the series.

On 6 May 2016 it was reported that Line of Duty would return for a fifth series. At this time, the BBC confirmed that the fourth and fifth series would move from BBC Two to BBC One, following a consolidation of the two channel's controllers. The series was commissioned by Piers Wagner, controller of BBC Drama, and Charlotte Moore, director of BBC Content. It was produced by Ken Horn and executive produced by Jed Mercurio, Simon Heath, Priscilla Parish, Tommy Bulfin. Mercurio also wrote the series. World Productions is the show's production company along with financing provided by Northern Ireland Screen.

Martin Compston, Vicky McClure, and Adrian Dunbar all returned to the programme, performing as Steve Arnott, Kate Fleming, and Ted Hastings, respectively. Joining the cast for the series are Stephen Graham and Rochenda Sandall. Graham portrayed John Corbett, an undercover officer using the alias John Clayton. Graham said that prior to taking on the role of Corbett, he spoke to a friend and Army Intelligence Officer who had done real life undercover work to gain insight. Sandall played Lisa McQueen, a high-ranking member in an organised crime group and stated that she felt McQueen's origins were "very much grounded in reality". Anna Maxwell Martin was also added to the cast for the final two episodes.

Other returning cast members include Maya Sondhi, Polly Walker, Aiysha Hart, Tony Pitts, and Andrea Irivine. Newcomers included Taj Atwal, Susan Vidler, Sian Reese-Williams, Ace Bhatti, and Elizabeth Rider. They are joined by guest stars Tommy Jessop, Richard Sutton, and Natalie Gavin. Gregory Piper reprised his role as Ryan Pilkington, a character last seen in the first series when Piper was 13 years-old. Piper had to re-audition for the part and believed that it could have been given to someone else. Craig Parkinson made a cameo appearance as Dot Cottan through footage that was filmed during production of series four, but went unused at the time.

Filming for the series took place from 3 September to 21 December 2018. The first four episodes were directed by John Strickland; Sue Tully directed the final two. Stephen Murphy was the cinematographer. Principal photography took place in Belfast, Northern Ireland. The cast and crew were spotted filming at Obel Tower. Additional recording took place across County Down, including in the town of Dundonald. Balaclavas had to be imported from London because sales of the item in Belfast are restricted. The series consisted of five hour-long episodes and an extended feature-length finale. The sixth series was broadcast on BBC One in 2021.

== Release ==
=== Broadcast and streaming ===
The series was first broadcast in the United Kingdom on BBC One from 31 March 2019. It concluded six weeks later on 5 May. In the United States Acorn TV acquired first-run streaming rights for the series that were previously held by Hulu. Acorn simulcast the series alongside its BBC One broadcast. It was later added to Hulu by 2021. After Kew Media collapsed in 2020, Quiver Entertainment purchased global distribution rights. In Canada and Australia the series streams on Netflix.

=== Home media ===
Line of Duty series 5 home media releases
Name	DVD release dates		Number of episodes	Number of discs
Name	Region 1	Region 2	Number of episodes	Number of discs
Line of Duty – Series 5	26 November 2019	6 May 2019	6	2
Line of Duty – Series 1–5 (Note: Titled Line of Duty: Series 1–5 Collection in region one)	26 November 2019	6 May 2019	29	10 (Note: 5 discs in region one)
Line of Duty – Series 1–6 Complete Box Set	—N/a	31 May 2021	36	12

== Reception ==
=== Viewing figures ===
The fifth series saw a notable increase in viewing figures from previous series. The first episode peaked at 8 million viewers, a 2.8 million increase from the first episode of the fourth series, and holding a 38% share. At the time the final episode was broadcast, it had the largest overnight viewing figures of the year so far, peaking at 9.6 million viewers and maintaining a 44.1% share.

No.	Title	Air date	Overnight ratings	Consolidated ratings		Total viewers (millions)	Ref(s)
No.	Title	Air date	Viewers (millions)	Viewers (millions)	Rank	Total viewers (millions)	Ref(s)
1	Episode 1	31 March 2019	7.80 (Note: Ranked first)	3.57	1	11.37	
2	Episode 2	7 April 2019	7.10	3.20	1	10.30	
3	Episode 3	14 April 2019	7.40	2.94	1	10.34	
4	Episode 4	21 April 2019	6.40	4.06	1	10.46	
5	Episode 5	28 April 2019	8.00	3.42	1	11.42	
6	Episode 6	5 May 2019	9.10	3.59	1	12.69	

=== Critical response ===
On the review aggregator website Rotten Tomatoes, 90% of 29 critics' reviews are positive, with an average rating of 8.70/10. The website's consensus reads: "Line of Duty's sterling ensemble all maintain a stiff upper lip, but audiences' limbs will be quavering throughout this tense fifth season that dives deep into moral murk." Metacritic, which uses a weighted average, assigned the series a score of 88 out of 100, based on 5 critics, indicating "universal acclaim". Reviewing the series premiere for The Guardian, Lucy Mangan opined that the series' opening moments were "ridiculous, unbearably tense and instantly addictive." Jasper Rees from The Daily Telegraph echoed similar sentiments, writing that "it's criminal how reliably gripping this thriller is."

Radio Times critic Eleanor Bley Griffiths praised Graham's acting, explaining that he held up to previous antagonists Keely Hawes and Thandie Newton, and stating that "he exudes menace from every balaclava-covered pore and you would not want to cross him. It's an inspired piece of casting." The Times' Hugo Rifkind wrote about the complexity of the series', saying that "you can't really call any of this formulaic, because the formula is its own, but the pattern of potential surprises feels as if it ought to be fairly well charted by now." The final episode received more mixed reviews from critics; with some believing it to be rewarding while others believed it underperformed. Sara Hughes, also with The Guardian, said that she appreciated the series ended on a "more downbeat conclusion than in previous series". Hughes expanded on the thought by explaining that she enjoyed the programme "for its quieter moments rather than its ever-so-twisty twists and enjoyed the fact that final revelations largely made sense instead of milking shock moments for all they were worth."

=== Accolades ===
Year	Award	Category	Nominee(s)	Result	Ref(s).
2019	Edinburgh TV Awards	Drama Series	Line of Duty	Nominated	
2019	Rockie Awards	Showrunner of the Year	Jed Mercurio	Won (Note: Also for Bodyguard)	
2019	Royal Television Society Midlands Awards	Acting Performance – Female	Vicky McClure	Won	
2019	Royal Television Society Midlands Awards	Writer	Jed Mercurio	Nominated	
2019	Royal Television Society Northern Ireland Awards	Best Drama	Line of Duty	Won	
2019	TV Choice Awards	Best Drama Series	Line of Duty	Won	
2019	TV Choice Awards	Best Actress	Vicky McClure	Nominated	
2019	TV Choice Awards	Best Actor	Adrian Dunbar	Won	
2019	TV Choice Awards	Best Actor	Martin Compston	Nominated	
2020	British Academy Television Awards	Virgin TV's Must-See Moment	"John Corbett's Death"	Nominated	
2020	Broadcasting Press Guild Awards	Best Actor	Stephen Graham	Won (Note: Also for A Christmas Carol and The Virtues)	
2020	Casting Director Guild Awards	Best Casting In A Television Drama	Kate Rhodes James, Daniel Edwards, and Gordon Cowell	Nominated	
2020	Celtic Media Festival Awards	Drama Series	Line of Duty	Nominated	
2020	Edgar Allen Poe Awards	Best Episode in a TV series	Jed Mercurio for "Episode 4"	Won	
2020	Irish Film & Television Awards	Actor in a Leading Role	Adrian Dunbar	Nominated	
2020	National Television Awards	Outstanding Drama Series	Line of Duty	Nominated	
2020	Televisual Bulldog Awards	Best Drama Series	Line of Duty	Won	
2020	Television and Radio Industries Club Awards	Crime Programme	Line of Duty	Won	
