= Line of Duty series 3 =

2016 series of Line of Duty

Line of Duty
- Series 3
- United Kingdom DVD cover art
- Showrunner: Jed Mercurio
- Starring: Daniel Mays; Martin Compston; Vicky McClure; Adrian Dunbar; Craig Parkinson; Keeley Hawes
- No. of episodes: 6

Release
- Original network: BBC Two
- Original release: 24 March – 28 April 2016

Series chronology
- ← Previous; Series 2 Next → Series 4

The third series of the British police procedural television programme Line of Duty, was broadcast on BBC Two between 24 March and 28 April 2016. It is the final series to air on BBC Two with all subsequent series airing on BBC One

The series follows the fictional Anti-Corruption Unit 12, a team tasked with "policing the police". AC-12 is led by Superintendent Ted Hastings (Adrian Dunbar), who is assisted by his team, DS Steve Arnott (Martin Compston), DC Kate Flemming (Vicky McClure), and DI Matthew "Dot" Cottan (Craig Parkinson). The unit investigates the actions of Sergeant Daniel Waldron (Daniel Mays), who is suspected of wrongfully shooting and killing a suspect. Waldron leads a team of authorised firearms officers backed by PC Rod Kennedy (Will Mellor), PC Harinderpal "Hari" Bains (Arsher Ali), and PC Jackie Brickford (Leanne Best). Lindsay Denton (Keeley Hawes), a former DI, returns as an officer formerly investigated by AC-12. Supporting characters include Gill Biggeloe (Polly Walker), Chief Superintendent Terry Reynolds (Shaun Parkes), DS Sam Railston (Aiysha Hart), Joe Nash (Jonas Armstrong), Maneet Bindra (Maya Sondhi), Chief Superintendent Patrick Fairbank (George Costigan), and DC Nigel Morton (Neil Morrissey).

The series was created and written by Jed Mercurio, who also serves as an executive producer. Six episodes were directed by Michael Keillor and John Strickland with cinematographer Peter Robertson. Filming took place in Belfast in 2015. The series received mostly positive reviews and was nominated for 13 awards, two of which were won. The fourth series, which had previously been commissioned with the third, was broadcast in 2017. Following the series, a fifth was also commissioned due to the third series success.

== Cast and characters ==
=== Main ===
- Daniel Mays as Sergeant Daniel Waldron (Note: Only receives main billing in the episodes in which he appears)
- Martin Compston as DS Steve Arnott
- Vicky McClure as DC Kate Fleming
- Adrian Dunbar as Superintendent Ted Hastings
- Craig Parkinson as DI Matthew "Dot" Cottan
- Keeley Hawes as Lindsay Denton (Note: Hawes is credited as a guest star in episode two and with the main cast in episodes 3–6)

=== Starring ===
- Polly Walker as Gill Biggeloe, special counsel to AC-12
- Will Mellor as PC Rod Kennedy
- Arsher Ali as PC Harinderpal "Hari" Bains
- Leanne Best as PC Jackie Brickford
- Shaun Parkes as Chief Superintendent Terry Reynolds
- Aiysha Hart as DS Sam Railston
- Jonas Armstrong as Joe Nash
- Maya Sondhi as PC Maneet Bindra
- George Costigan as Chief Superintendent Patrick Fairbank
- Neil Morrissey as DC Nigel Morton

=== Recurring ===
- Lisa Palfrey as Inspector Tracy McAndrew
- James Edlin as AFO Lambert

=== Guest ===
- Shane Gately as Ronan Murphy
- Louis Rolston as Linus Murphy
- Kiran Landa as Laila Bains
- Rebecca O'Mara as Rachel O'Conner
- Adjoa Andoh as prosecutor
- Brian Ferguson as Robin Stewart
- Mandana Jones as Superintendent Madeline Summers

== Episodes ==
Line of Duty series 3 episodes
No. overall	No. in series	Title	Directed by	Written by	Original release date	UK viewers (millions)
12	1	"Episode 1" "Monsters"	Michael Keillor	Jed Mercurio	24 March 2016	3.31
Sergeant Danny Waldron and his team of armed officers are deployed to detain Ronan Murphy, a suspect wanted in connection with a murder plot. The suspect flees into a nearby housing estate, where Waldron corners him. Murphy surrenders his gun, but Waldron shoots him in cold blood and manipulates the scene to make it look like self-defence. When the rest of his team arrives, Waldron orders them to aid in the cover-up. Waldron denies any wrongdoing to AC-12. Superintendent Ted Hastings sends DC Kate Fleming undercover in Waldron's squad. On their next call, they are tasked with raiding the home of a drug-dealer where Waldron pockets an illegal firearm. Waldron spies on Ronan Murphy's funeral and follows Murphy's uncle, Linus, home from the funeral. Holding Linus at gunpoint, Waldron admits to killing Ronan for revenge, and begins to torture Linus. Back at his flat, Waldron leaves a list of names in an envelope addressed to DS Steve Arnott. Unhappy with her actions at an earlier call, Waldron attempts to sideline Fleming when his team raids another house. When Fleming hears a gunshot, she rushes upstairs anyway to find Waldron bleeding out.
13	2	"Episode 2" "The Process"	Michael Keillor	Jed Mercurio	31 March 2016	5.11
Fleming attempts to provide first aid to Waldron, who dies. The remaining members of his team are interviewed by AC-12 and claim Waldron shot himself. Hastings arrests them, but counsellor Gill Biggeloe convinces him to rescind the arrest. The police search Waldron's flat where DI Matthew Cottan discovers the stolen firearm, a photograph of a young Waldron and other boys alongside the Murphys, and the envelope containing Waldron's list. Cottan takes the list and later destroys it. Arnott locates Linus Murphy's decapitated body, then finds the head in a storage room rented by Waldron. Lindsay Denton, a former officer investigated by AC-12, has appealed her conviction for conspiracy to murder Tommy Hunter. Denton claims in court that she had sex with Arnott, which puts strains on his relationship with DS Sam Railston. The next morning, PC Rod Kennedy, a member of Waldron's team, is found hanged by apparent suicide in a warehouse. The remaining two members, PC Hari Bains and PC Jackie Brickford, now claim to AC-12 that Kennedy shot Waldron. Bains receives a package containing a burner phone, and is congratulated on his deception.
14	3	"Episode 3" "Snake Pit"	Michael Keillor	Jed Mercurio	7 April 2016	4.97
Fleming asks Cottan to organise a second examination of Kennedy's body, which Cottan intentionally neglects to do. The photo of young Waldron is traced to Sands View boys' home. Arnott identifies Joseph Nash, another boy in the picture, and interviews him. Nash explains Linus Murphy was the caretaker at Sands View, and allowed the boys to be sexually abused by Ronan and other men. He identifies one of the abusers as city councillor Dale Roach, who is unable to stand trial. Brickford decides to confess the truth about Waldron and Ronan's death. Arnott orders a second post-mortem on Kennedy's body which indicates he was murdered. AC-12 moves to arrest Bains, but Cottan warns him. Bains travels to the warehouse where Kennedy was hung and is framed by Cottan for a second murder attempt. Bains is arrested. At the conclusion of Denton's trial, the jury finds her guilty of perverting the course of justice but not guilty of conspiracy to murder. She is released with time already served. Burner phones found in a search of Bains' home suggest he was acting on orders. As Cottan watches the news footage of Denton's release, a number of mobile phones begin to ring simultaneously.
15	4	"Episode 4" "Negative Pressure"	John Strickland	Jed Mercurio	14 April 2016	4.82
Denton demands a formal apology from AC-12 for her wrongful conviction. She later records an exploitative parole sponsor pressuring her into sex. Cottan is awarded with a commendation for arresting Bains. He then proceeds to tell Biggeloe and Fleming he is concerned about Arnott's behaviour. Bains confesses to killing Waldron on the demands of his unknown contact, but insists he did not murder Kennedy. AC-12 eventually interviews former Vice Chief Superintendent Patrick Fairbank in connection to a possible Sands View police cover up, but he claims to remember no details of the case. Cottan meets former colleague DC Nigel Morton and threatens to derail his pension if he does not hand over a mobile phone and SIM card with records of Cottan's calls made to Hunter. Cottan later creates a profile for 'The Caddy', a known associate to Hunter presumed to be a police officer, which he deliberately engineers to fit Arnott. Morton later hands the phone and SIM card to Cottan, who then destroys the SIM card in a car park, but it is revealed it was a duplicate and Morton still possesses the items in his car.
16	5	"Episode 5" "The List"	John Strickland	Jed Mercurio	21 April 2016	5.09
Cottan continues to attack Arnott by pressuring PC Maneet Bindra to keep key forensics on the envelope found in Waldron's flat private, and then by spreading rumours surrounding Arnott's conduct. Arnott is suspended by a hesitant Hastings. Meanwhile, Fairbank is called in for another interview and maintains his ignorance as he is presented with images of alleged abusers. Nash is shown a photograph of Fairbank, ostensibly to identify him as an officer that had overlooked accusations, but his extreme reaction suggests to Fleming that Fairbank was one of the abusers. Arnott and Denton investigate the possibility that Waldron hid another copy of his list of abusers. Denton surmises the list is kept digitally, so she tricks Arnott into pursuing a false lead while she goes to an internet cafe near Waldron's flat to access his emails. She finds a photograph of the list in his drafts folder and transfers it to hers as insurance. Cottan, in Arnott's stolen service vehicle, is outside and summons her to his car. He offers Denton money for the list. Denton, staying true to her morals as a former police officer, rejects this and defiantly emails the list to Hastings, for which Cottan kills her.
17	6	"Episode 6" "Breach"	John Strickland	Jed Mercurio	28 April 2016	5.58
Hastings receives the list sent by Denton which identifies Fairbank as one of the abusers. Arnott reports his service vehicle missing as Hastings attends a call where Denton's body has been discovered in Arnott's car. Arnott is arrested on suspicion of murder. During questioning, evidence is presented identifying Arnott as 'The Caddy'. Arnott concludes another officer has set him up, but has no way of proving it. With outside authorisation, Fleming has been carrying out an undercover operation into AC-12 officers. New evidence allows Hastings and Fleming to interview Cottan about holes in his evidence against Arnott. Cottan stalls and sends a text reading "Urgent exit required." An armed officer enables Cottan to escape. Fleming gives chase, but Cottan is rescued by a getaway car. Fleming shoots the driver which stops the car. As she approaches, Cottan jumps in front of three final shots from within the car, saving Fleming. Cottan records a dying declaration that directly leads to Fairbank being imprisoned. Arnott is exonerated and returns to AC-12, where Hastings and Fleming also remain. Fleming receives a commendation and is promoted to Detective Sergeant. Denton receives posthumous recognition for her contributions. Morton retires on full pension plus disability benefits.

== Production ==
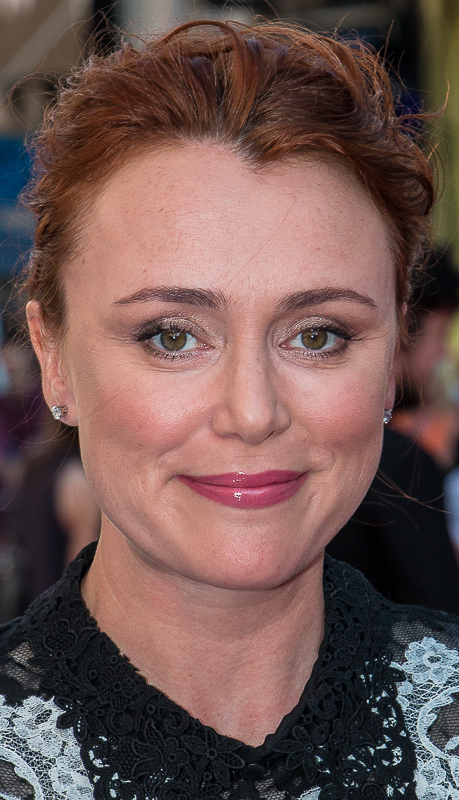
Keeley Hawes

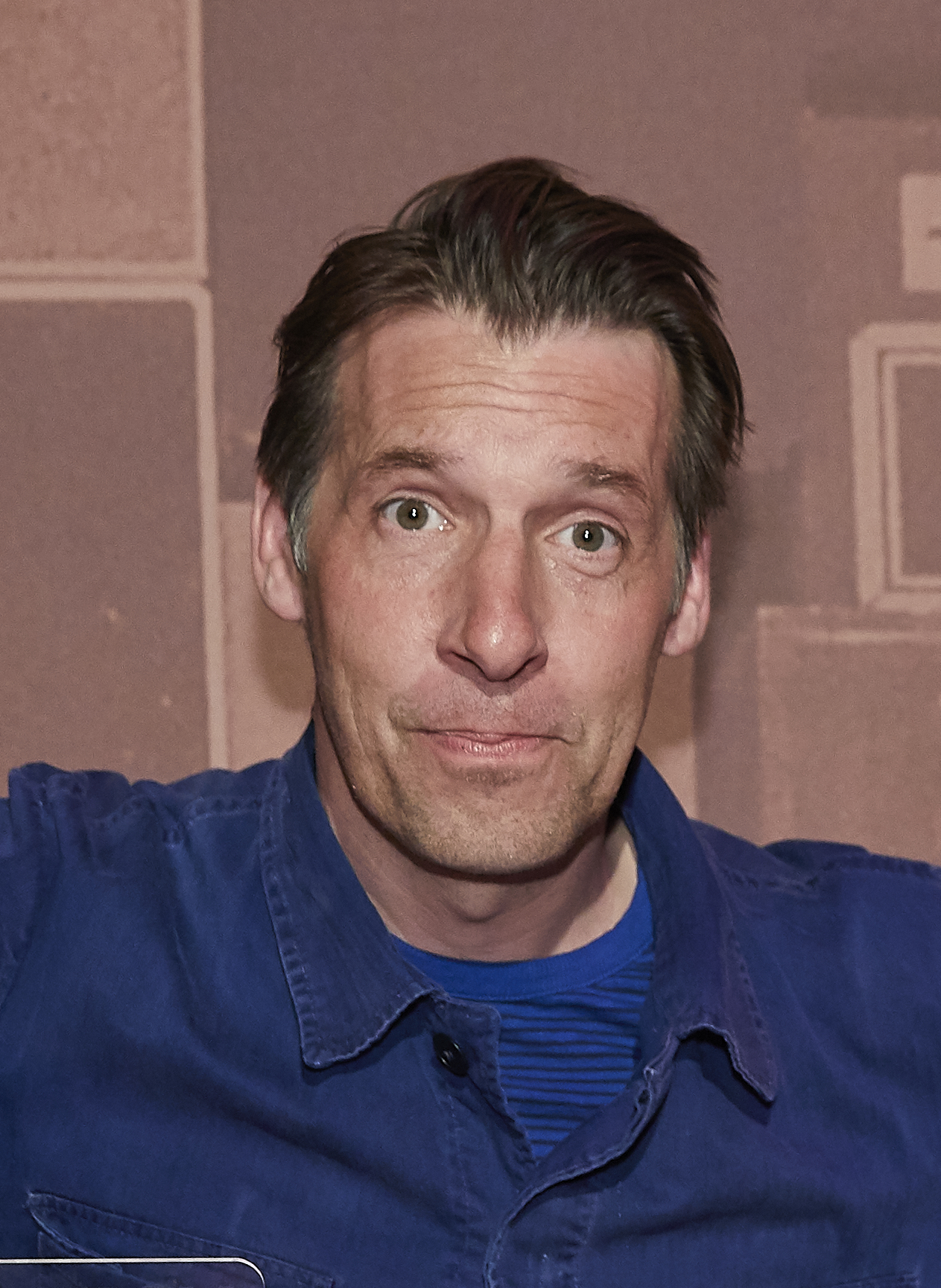
Craig Parkinson

DI Lindsay Denton (portrayed by Hawes) and DI Matthew "Dot" Cottan (portrayed by Parkinson) were killed off in the series penultimate and finale episodes, respectively.

In March 2014, while the second series was still airing it was reported that discussions were already occurring on a potential third series of Line of Duty. On 8 April, it was officially commissioned for a third and fourth series by BBC Two. Series creator and writer Jed Mercurio returned to executive produce alongside Simon Heath and Stephen Wright for World Productions and BBC Northern Ireland, respectively, and producer Peter Norris.

Cast members Martin Compston, Vicky McClure, and Adrian Dunbar all returned to the series. Actor Daniel Mays was announced to be joining the series cast as Daniel Waldron, the latest officer to be investigated by the fictional Anti-Corruption Unit 12 (AC-12). Craig Parkinson also reprised his role as Matthew "Dot" Cottan. Keeley Hawes, who starred in series two as DI Lindsay Denton, initially stated that she would not return to Line of Duty due to her conflicting filming on the Fungus the Bogeyman television adaptation. Will Mellor, Arsher Ali, and Leanne Best also joined the cast in supporting roles. Mellor, Ali, and Best portrayed a group of authorised firearms officers, led by Mays' character. Mercurio later decided to bring Hawes back to the series as a result of Denton's positive reception and made changes to a script to allow for Waldron's death. On her return, Hawes stated that she didn't expect to ever return to the series, but was glad to be given the opportunity. Mercurio also considered not killing Parkinson's character, but believed viewers wanted justice. Other supporting cast members include the returning Neil Morrisey and newcomers Polly Walker, Shaun Parkes, Aiysha Hart, Jonas Armstrong, Maya Sondhi, and George Costigan.

Filming began in Belfast in March 2015. Michael Kellior directed the first three episodes while John Strickland directed the final three. Peter Robertson provided cinematography work. Filming locations included BT Riverside Tower, McHugh's Bar, Belfast City Hall, and Invest Northern Ireland. The series consisted of five hour-long episodes and an extended feature-length finale. Due to the success of the series a fifth series was commissioned on 6 May 2016, with the fourth and fifth series moving to BBC One.

== Release ==
=== Broadcast and streaming ===
The series was first broadcast on BBC Two in the United Kingdom on 24 March 2016, and concluded six weeks later on 28 April. In the United States the series was released on Hulu on 1 May 2016. It was added to Acorn TV in November 2017. Additionally, it can be streamed on BritBox and was later broadcast on the American basic cable channel AMC beginning 20 June 2020. (Note: Acorn TV and AMC are both owned by AMC Networks Inc.) In Canada and Australia the series streams on Netflix.

=== Home media ===
Line of Duty series 3 home media releases
Name	DVD release dates		Number of episodes	Number of discs
Name	Region 1	Region 2	Number of episodes	Number of discs
Line of Duty: Series 3	9 August 2016	2 May 2016	6	2 (Note: 3 discs in region one)
Line Of Duty: Series 1-3	—N/a	2 May 2016	17	6
Line of Duty - Series 1-4	—N/a	8 May 2017	23	8
Line of Duty - Series 1-5 (Note: Titled Line of Duty: Series 1-5 Collection in region one)	26 November 2019	6 May 2019	29	10 (Note: 5 discs in region one)
Line of Duty - Series 1-6 Complete Box Set	—N/a	31 May 2021	36	12

== Reception ==
=== Viewing figures ===
By the time the fourth episode had concluded airing, Line of Duty was the highest-rated series to air on BBC Two since 2002. The series maintained a 19.3% share in consolidated data.

No.	Title	Air date	Overnight ratings	Consolidated ratings		Total viewers (millions)	28-day viewers (millions)	28-day rank	Ref(s)
No.	Title	Air date	Viewers (millions)	Viewers (millions)	Rank	Total viewers (millions)	28-day viewers (millions)	28-day rank	Ref(s)
1	Episode 1	24 March 2016	—N/a	—N/a	1	3.31	3.53	1	
2	Episode 2	31 March 2016	3.63	1.48	1	5.11	6.02	1	
3	Episode 3	7 April 2016	3.40	1.57	1	4.97	5.73	1	
4	Episode 4	14 April 2016	3.30	1.52	1	4.82	5.55	1	
5	Episode 5	21 April 2016	3.40	1.67	1	5.09	5.72	1	
6	Episode 6	28 April 2016	4.10	1.48	1	5.58	5.93	1	

=== Critical response ===
On the review aggregator website Rotten Tomatoes the series holds an approval rating of 100% based on seven reviews. Reviewing the series premiere for Den of Geek, Louisa Mellor wrote about how Waldron's character developed from being just dirty cop to a victim as well, and how this deceit was a result of Mercurio's depth of writing Mays' acting. Sara Hughes with The Guardian stated that it was a strong premiere for a returning series. Hawes's return as Denton was praised by many critics who noted the passion and complexity behind the performance as well as her unexpected death. The series was also mentioned for its impact on gender equality as a result of its strong female leads. CultBox's Rob Smedley appreciated the morally gray characters for their complexity.

After the series concluded, Mercurio's writing was further applauded by Smedley, writing that Mercurio has the "rare ability to make watching an interview scene feel like tip-toeing across a minefield, and to make that an experience you crave more of." Mellor further complimented these scenes by observing that two of them together used over forty minutes of screentime. She further elaborated stating that "interview scenes are what stops us getting whiplash from the speed at which Line Of Duty zooms through plot" and mentioning the contrast between the programme's interview and action scenes. The final scene of the series, which featured gunfights and a car chase, received largely mixed reviews from critics; some condemned it for being unrealistic, while others commended it as uncharted territory for a British television series.

A former Metropolitan Police homicide detective criticised the accuracy of the series, stating that it "suggests a culture where fatal shootings are not thoroughly investigated and where dangerous officers can be re-issued with firearms."

=== Accolades ===
Year	Award	Category	Nominee(s)	Result	Ref(s).
2016	British Academy Scotland Awards	Director Film/Television	Michael Keillor	Nominated	
2016	Royal Television Society Northern Ireland Awards	Best Drama	Line of Duty	Nominated	
2016	TV Choice Awards	Best Drama	Line of Duty	Nominated	
2017	British Academy Television Awards	Virgin TV's Must-See Moment	"Urgent Exit Required"	Nominated	
2017	British Academy Television Awards	Best Supporting Actor	Daniel Mays	Nominated	
2017	Broadcast Magazine Awards	Best Drama Series	Line of Duty	Nominated	
2017	Broadcasting Press Guild Awards	Best Drama Series	Line of Duty	Nominated	
2017	Broadcasting Press Guild Awards	Best Actress	Keely Hawes	Won (Note: Also for The Durrells and The Missing)	
2017	Celtic Media Festival	Drama Series	Line of Duty	Won	
2017	Diversity in Media Awards	TV Moment of the Year	"Urgent Exit Required"	Nominated	
2017	Royal Television Society Programme Awards	Best Drama Series	Line of Duty	Nominated	
2017	Royal Television Society Programme Awards	Best Drama Writer	Jed Mercurio	Nominated	
2017	Royal Television Society Scotland Awards	Television Director of the Year	Michael Keillor	Nominated	
