= Line of Duty series 2 =

2014 series of Line of Duty

Line of Duty
- Series 2
- United Kingdom DVD cover art
- Showrunner: Jed Mercurio
- Starring: Keeley Hawes; Martin Compston; Vicky McClure; Adrian Dunbar; Jessica Raine; Craig Parkinson
- No. of episodes: 6

Release
- Original network: BBC Two
- Original release: 12 February – 19 March 2014

Series chronology
- ← Previous; Series 1 Next → Series 3

The second series of the British police procedural television programme Line of Duty was broadcast on BBC Two between 12 February and 19 March 2014.

The series follows the actions of the fictional Anti-Corruption Unit 12. AC-12 is led by Superintendent Ted Hastings (Adrian Dunbar), who is assisted by his team DS Steve Arnott (Martin Compston), DC Kate Fleming (Vicky McClure), and DI Matthew "Dot" Cottan (Craig Parkinson). The unit investigates DI Lindsay Denton (Keeley Hawes), the sole survivor of an attack on police officers, and the possibility of a corrupt police officer conspiring to murder a protected witness in the ambush. Jessica Raine stars in a single episode as DC Georgia Trotman. Beginning with this series, Dunbar and Parkinson are credited as main cast members in the opening credits. Supporting characters include DCC Mike Dryden (Mark Bonnar), Jo Dwyer (Liz White), DCS Lester Hargreaves (Tony Pitts), DC Nigel Morton (Neil Morrissey), and Tommy Hunter (Brian McCardie).

The series was created and written by Jed Mercurio, who also serves as an executive producer. Filming took place in Belfast in 2013. Six episodes were directed by Douglas Mackinnon and Daniel Nettheim with cinematographer Ruairi O'Brien. The series received positive reviews and multiple accolades, most notably for Hawes's performance as Denton, leading to the commission of a third and fourth series.

== Cast and characters ==
=== Main ===
- Keeley Hawes as DI Lindsay Denton
- Martin Compston as DS Steve Arnott
- Vicky McClure as DC Kate Fleming
- Adrian Dunbar as Superintendent Ted Hastings
- Jessica Raine as DC Georgia Trotman (Note: Only receives main billing in the episodes in which they appear)
- Craig Parkinson as DI Matthew "Dot" Cottan

=== Starring ===
- Mark Bonnar as DCC Mike Dryden
- Liz White as Jo Dwyer
- Tony Pitts as DCS Lester Hargreaves
- Neil Morrissey as DC Nigel Morton
- Brian McCardie as Tommy Hunter

=== Recurring ===
- Steve Toussaint as Chief Superintendent Raymond Mallick
- Andrea Irvine as Roisin Hastings
- Henry Pettigrew as DC Jeremy Cole
- Michael Nardone as Sergeant O'Neill
- Niall Macgregor as Richard Akers
- Richard Huw as Nick Ronson, Evening Post journalist
- Christina Chong as DS Nicola Rogerson
- Sacha Dhawan as DS Manish Prasad
- Charlotte Spencer as Carly Kirk

=== Guest ===
- Allison McKenzie as DS Jayne Akers
- David Maybrick as Sergeant Alex Wallis
- Antonio Magro as PC Vincent Butler

== Episodes ==
Line of Duty series 2 episodes
No. overall	No. in series	Title	Directed by	Written by	Original release date	UK viewers (millions)
6	1	"Episode 1" "The Ambush"	Douglas Mackinnon	Jed Mercurio	12 February 2014	2.74
A police convoy escorting a witness under protection is attacked. The witness is hospitalised, and all police officers are killed – with the exception of DI Lindsay Denton, who organised transport, and only informed DCC Mike Dryden. Superintendent Ted Hastings asks DS Steve Arnott and DC Kate Fleming to investigate Denton, but Fleming asks not to take part. She explains that she trained with DS Jayne Akers, one of the dead officers, but does not disclose that she has also been having an affair with Akers's husband, Richard. She is replaced by DC Georgia Trotman, an ambitious but less-experienced officer. Trotman and Arnott quickly grow close and begin a personal relationship. Hastings tries to keep up appearances with his estranged wife, Roisin. Denton is transferred to a missing persons unit and Fleming goes undercover as her assistant. Fleming follows Denton to the nursing home where her mother lives and sees Denton ring the hospital where the witness is being treated from a payphone. Trotman and Arnott race to the hospital and confront a man disguised as a nurse. Arnott is knocked unconscious, Trotman is thrown out of a window, and the witness is killed.
7	2	"Episode 2" "Carly"	Douglas Mackinnon	Jed Mercurio	19 February 2014	3.21
Trotman is found dead as a result of her injuries. Arnott discovers that a nurse on the witness's ward, Claire Tindall, was threatened into giving the killer access. Denton begins her work in missing persons with the case of a vanished 15-year-old, Carly Kirk. As they work together, Fleming attempts to gain Denton's confidence, but Denton sees through this, assaults Fleming and steals her phone. Denton is interviewed by AC-12 and claims that she called the hospital to ask that the witness exonerate her, but the team do not believe her, and Hastings arrests her for conspiracy. At this point Denton turns the tables and gives evidence, on the record, that Arnott made an unofficial romantic visit to Claire, Hastings has financial problems (something he previously cited as making Denton vulnerable to bribery), and Fleming's mobile phone has an "interesting" call history (alluding to her affair with Richard Akers). Meanwhile, a story surfaces in the press that DCC Dryden took penalty points for his wife when she committed a driving offence.
8	3	"Episode 3" "Behind Bars"	Douglas Mackinnon	Jed Mercurio	26 February 2014	3.34
Denton is denied bail and remanded in custody, where she is victimised by both staff and prisoners and warned not to assist AC-12. Hastings requests witness protection records allowing AC-12 to discover the witness was Tommy Hunter, the gang leader previously arrested by DCI Tony Gates. (Note: As seen in series 1) Fleming visits Denton who claims she is being set up. Denton's accusations cause friction between Hastings and Arnott. Meanwhile, Dryden's driving offence continues to occupy the press. To draw attention away from himself, Dryden leaks the information that Denton is the officer under investigation. Now a DI, "Dot" Cottan, who previously worked under Gates, is assigned to AC-12 by Dryden. Arnott sleeps with DS Nicola Rogerson of Major Violent Crimes, who passes him information. At the site where Fleming's cover was blown, Arnott and Fleming discover a body, assumed to be that of Carly Kirk. Fleming re-interviews Denton, who claims that Dryden had an affair with her and has set her up. Fleming discovers that Dryden and Denton previously worked together. Cottan discovers from forensic accountants that Jayne Akers received a large sum of cash shortly before she died. Arnott visits Denton in prison and informs her that he believes her.
9	4	"Episode 4" "Blood Money"	Daniel Nettheim	Jed Mercurio	5 March 2014	3.46
Arnott and Fleming persuade Hastings to bring Dryden in for questioning, but find him uncooperative. AC-12 face a further problem when the Major Violent Crimes team bring in Richard Akers before they can do so. Arnott mistakenly assumed Rogerson would tell him if they were going to and that Akers was unaware of his wife's corruption and decided he was not a priority. When they do interview Akers, he reveals that Jayne kept recordings of Hunter as leverage and stored them at a PO Box. The recordings show Hunter threatening to inform on various parties, including corrupt police officers, unless they ensure his protection and immunity. AC-12 begin seeking the identity of 'The Caddy', the codename of a corrupt police officer mentioned by Hunter. Denton is granted permission to visit her dying mother at her nursing home. On the return journey, Denton's prison van is run off the road. Fleeing for her life, Denton finds herself confronted by two police officers, who unbeknownst to her are corrupt: DS Manish Prasad and Trotman's killer, DC Jeremy Cole. Prasad and Cole shove Denton in the boot of their car and drive away.
10	5	"Episode 5" "Last Words"	Daniel Nettheim	Jed Mercurio	12 March 2014	3.73
Prasad and Cole torture Denton in a parking garage hoping to find out what she has told investigators, and she reveals only that Dryden set her up. Prasad kills Cole for being "a liability" before Denton manages to escape from her kidnappers. Using the car, she pins Prasad to the wall and forces him to record a dying confession implicating Dryden before calling Arnott. She escapes on foot and goes to see her mother again who has since died. Arnott allows her some quiet time before she is returned to custody. AC-12 find themselves forced to decide where their loyalties lie between Denton and Dryden. Photos are discovered showing Dryden having participated in sexual acts with Kirk. This results in Arnott and Fleming arresting Dryden when they also believe he is the last one to have seen Kirk alive. However, when presented with AC-12's evidence, Dryden strongly maintains he is also being set up. Meanwhile, Cottan approaches DC Nigel Morton from his old team. Morton is the officer who sold the story about Dryden's driving offence to the papers, and Cottan blackmails him into falsely saying Cole, the deceased kidnapper, was nicknamed "The Caddy" by fellow officers.
11	6	"Episode 6" "The Caddy"	Daniel Nettheim	Jed Mercurio	19 March 2014	4.12
Dryden claims that Denton was stalking him and was at the car park when he was photographed with Kirk. Arnott finds a large amount of money hidden among the possessions Denton took from her mother's room. The buried body turns out not to be Kirk's. Prasad gives evidence against Denton in return for reduced sentencing. Morton and Cottan agree not to inform on each other. Dryden receives a suspended sentence for perverting the course of justice for the driving offence and resigns from the police force. Denton is convicted of conspiracy to murder and given a life sentence. Cottan is asked to remain in AC-12. In flashback, prior to the ambush, Denton follows Dryden to the reception, where she sees Kirk flirting with him. Denton follows Kirk and Dryden, where she sees Hunter assault Kirk after leaving Dryden's car. She later approaches Hunter, but DS Akers intervenes. Akers visits Denton at home to request help in saving Kirk by handing Hunter over to his criminal associates. With a pay-off, Akers persuades Denton to assist in the handover, which also involves Cottan. Akers and Hunter are killed to protect Cottan's identity, and Denton is left alive to take the blame.

== Production ==
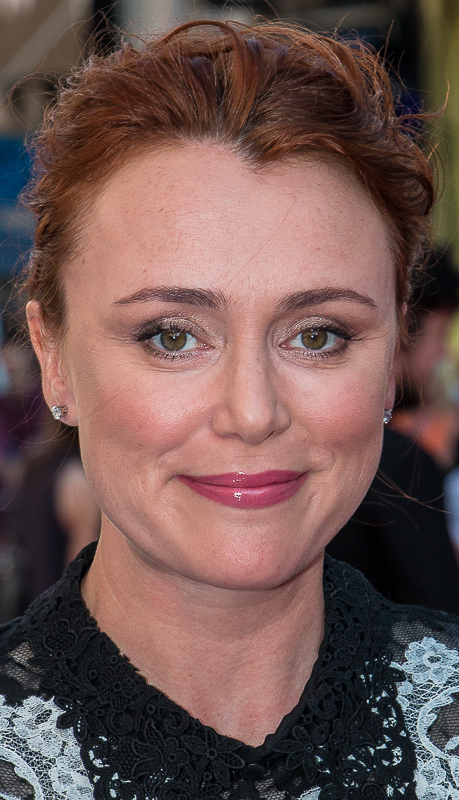
Keeley Hawes received critical acclaim for her performance in the series as DI Lindsay Denton, earning the nickname "Steely Keeley."

On 25 July 2012, the day after the first series had concluded, BBC Two commissioned a second series of Line of Duty from World Productions. Creator Jed Mercurio wrote the series's episodes and executive produced it alongside Simon Heath for World Productions and Stephen Wright for BBC Northern Ireland. Peter Norris produced the series.

Actors Martin Compston and Vicky McClure returned from the first series. Adrian Dunbar also returned to the series and was promoted to the main cast. Craig Parkinson reprised his role beginning in episode three. Keely Hawes, Robert Lindsay, and Jessica Raine were announced as new members of the cast. Lindsay departed from the series after two days of filming due to "creative differences" and was later replaced by Mark Bonnar. Hawes stated that when she first received the script Mercurio had not yet decided if her character would actually be a corrupt police officer. Supporting cast members include Neil Morrissey, Brian McCardie, and Tony Pitts.

For the second series filming moved to Belfast and began in mid-2013. The six hour-long episodes were split into two filming blocks with Douglas Mackinnon returning to direct the first block of episodes and Daniel Nettheim directing the second. Ruairi O'Brien also returned as the series's Director of Photography. The headquarters of Invest Northern Ireland doubled as Anti-Corruption Unit 12's office building, while the exterior of Belfast Central Library served as the police headquarters façade. One scene filmed with McClure, Compston, and Bonnar covered 18 pages of a script. Due to the success of the second series a third and fourth series were commissioned in April 2014.

== Release ==
=== Broadcast and streaming ===
The series was first broadcast in the United Kingdom on BBC Two beginning 12 February 2014 and concluding six weeks later on 19 March. Some episodes also aired on BBC Two HD. In the United States the series is available to stream on Acorn TV, BritBox, and Hulu. It was also broadcast on the American basic cable channel AMC beginning 9 May 2020. (Note: Acorn TV and AMC are both owned by AMC Networks Inc.) In Canada and Australia the series streams on Netflix. The series was later re-broadcast on BBC One beginning 6 February 2021 due to COVID-19 filming shutdowns delaying production of the sixth series.

=== Home media ===
Line of Duty series 2 home media releases
Name	DVD release dates		Number of episodes	Number of discs
Name	Region 1	Region 2	Number of episodes	Number of discs
Line of Duty Series 2	4 June 2014	24 March 2014	6	2
Line of Duty: Complete Series 1 & 2	—N/a	24 March 2014	11	4
Line Of Duty: Series 1-3	—N/a	2 May 2016	17	6
Line of Duty - Series 1-4	—N/a	8 May 2017	23	8
Line of Duty - Series 1-5 (Note: Titled Line of Duty: Series 1-5 Collection in region one)	26 November 2019	6 May 2019	29	10 (Note: 5 discs in region one)
Line of Duty - Series 1-6 Complete Box Set	—N/a	31 May 2021	36	12

== Reception ==
=== Viewing figures ===
By the time the third series had concluded airing, Line of Duty was the eighth-highest-rated series to air on BBC Two since 2002. The series maintained a 12.3% share in consolidated data.

No.	Title	Air date	Overnight ratings	Consolidated ratings		Total viewers (millions)	Ref(s)
No.	Title	Air date	Viewers (millions)	Viewers (millions)	Rank	Total viewers (millions)	Ref(s)
1	Episode 1	12 February 2014	1.80	0.94	7	2.74	
2	Episode 2	19 February 2014	2.20	1.01	4	3.21	
3	Episode 3	26 February 2014	2.20	1.14	2	3.34	
4	Episode 4	5 March 2014	2.30	1.16	3	3.46	
5	Episode 5	12 March 2014	2.60	1.13	2	3.73	
6	Episode 6	19 March 2014	3.30	0.82	1	4.12	

=== Critical response ===
On the review aggregator website Rotten Tomatoes the series holds a 100% rating based on five reviews. The Huffington Post's Caroline Frost said that the series opened to a story stronger than that of its predecessor. Reviewing the series premiere for Den of Geek, Louisa Mellor praised Hawes' performance, comparing it favorably with that of Lennie James from the first series. Yvonne Roberts from The Guardian also admired the performance of Hawes, writing that the series "smash[ed] gender stereotypes". Rob Smedley of Cult Box mentioned the moral ambiguity between the officers being investigated and AC-12 themselves. Following the series finale Mellor stated that the final episode once again felt rushed. Alex Fletcher, writing for Digital Spy, commended Mercurio's scripts for ending the series on a less-than satisfying resolution. Smedley also applauded the series use of an ensemble cast. During its 2021 re-broadcast on BBC One ahead of the sixth series, The Daily Telegraph's Michael Hogan wrote that this series was Line of Duty at its best. Euan Ferguson later ranked the series number one on The Guardian's "Best British TV dramas of 2014" list.

=== Accolades ===
Accolades received by Line of Duty series 2
Year	Award	Category	Nominee(s)	Result	Ref(s).
2014	British Academy Scotland Awards	Best Television Actor	Mark Bonnar	Nominated	
2014	Crime Thriller Awards	Best TV Dagger	Line of Duty	Nominated	
2014	Crime Thriller Awards	Best Actress	Keely Hawes	Won	
2014	Crime Thriller Awards	Best Supporting Actress	Vicky McClure	Nominated	
2014	Freesat Awards	Best TV Drama	Line of Duty	Won	
2014	Royal Television Society Craft & Design Awards	Editing	Andrew McClelland	Nominated	
2015	Broadcast Magazine Awards	Best Drama Series	Line of Duty	Nominated	
2015	Broadcast Magazine Awards	Best Independent Production Company	World Productions	Nominated	
2015	Broadcast Magazine Awards	International Programme Sales	Kew Media Distribution	Nominated	
2015	British Academy Television Awards	Best Mini-Series	Line of Duty	Nominated	
2015	British Academy Television Awards	Best Leading Actress	Keely Hawes	Nominated	
2015	British Academy Television Awards	Best Supporting Actress	Vicky McClure	Nominated	
2015	British Academy Television Craft Awards	Best Writer - Drama	Jed Mercurio	Nominated	
2015	Broadcasting Press Guild Awards	Best Drama Series	Line of Duty	Nominated	
2015	Broadcasting Press Guild Awards	Best Actress	Keely Hawes	Nominated	
2015	Broadcasting Press Guild Awards	Best Writer	Jed Mercurio	Nominated	
2015	Royal Television Society Northern Ireland Awards	Best Drama	Line of Duty	Won	
2015	Royal Television Society Programme Awards	Best Drama Series	Line of Duty	Won	
2015	South Bank Sky Arts Awards	TV Drama	Line of Duty	Nominated	
2015	Televisual Bulldog Awards	Best Drama Serial	Line of Duty	Nominated	
2015	Televisual Bulldog Awards	Best Editing	Andrew McClelland	Nominated	
2015	Writers' Guild of Great Britain Awards	Best Long Form TV Drama	Jed Mercurio	Nominated	
