= Line of Duty series 1 =

2012 series of Line of Duty

Line of Duty
- Series 1
- United Kingdom DVD cover art
- Showrunner: Jed Mercurio
- Starring: Lennie James; Martin Compston; Vicky McClure
- No. of episodes: 5

Release
- Original network: BBC Two
- Original release: 26 June – 24 July 2012

Series chronology
- Next → Series 2

The first series of the British police procedural television programme Line of Duty was broadcast on BBC Two between 26 June and 24 July 2012.

The series follows the actions of the fictional Anti-Corruption Unit 12. AC-12 is led by Superintendent Ted Hastings (Adrian Dunbar), who recruits DS Steve Arnott (Martin Compston) and is backed by undercover officer DC Kate Fleming (Vicky McClure), as they lead an investigation into the corrupt actions of DCI Tony Gates (Lennie James). Gates leads Tactical Operations Unit 20 (TO-20), which includes DS Matthew "Dot" Cottan (Craig Parkinson) and DC Nigel Morton (Neil Morrissey). Supporting characters include Jackie Laverty (Gina McKee), Jools Gates (Kate Ashfield), Chief Superintendent Derek Hilton (Paul Higgins), Chief Inspector Philip Osborne (Owen Teale), and Tommy Hunter (Brian McCardie).

The series was created and written by Jed Mercurio, who also serves as a producer. Filming took place in Birmingham in late 2011. Five episodes were directed by David Caffrey and Douglas Mackinnon with cinematographer Ruairi O'Brien. Despite being censured by Ofcom, the series received mostly positive reviews and was nominated for multiple awards, leading to the commission of a second series.

== Cast and characters ==
=== Main ===
- Lennie James as DCI Tony Gates
- Martin Compston as DS Steve Arnott
- Vicky McClure as DC Kate Fleming

=== Starring ===
- Gina McKee as Jackie Laverty
- Adrian Dunbar as Superintendent Ted Hastings
- Craig Parkinson as DS Matthew "Dot" Cottan
- Kate Ashfield as Jools Gates
- Paul Higgins as Chief Superintendent Derek Hilton
- Neil Morrissey as DC Nigel Morton
- Owen Teale as Chief Inspector Philip Osborne
- Brian McCardie as Tommy Hunter

=== Recurring ===
- Claire Keelan as DS Leah Janson
- Fiona Boylan as PC Karen Larkin
- Faraz Ayub as DC Deepak Kapoor
- Alison Lintott as Rita Bennett, civilian police investigator
- Brian Miller as Alf Butterfield
- Darren Morfitt as PS Colin Brackley
- Neet Mohan as PC Simon Bannerjee
- Gregory Piper as Ryan Pilkington
- Tomi May as Miroslav Minkowicz
- Lauren O'Rourke as Keely Pilkington
- Nigel Boyle as DI Ian Buckells

=== Guest ===
- Elisa Lasowski as Nadzia Wojcik, waitress at the Sunflower Cafe
- Dylan Duffus as Wesley Duke
- Heather Craney as DCI Alice Prior
- Elliot Rosen as Terry Boyle
- Marie Critchley as Jane Hargreaves, social worker

== Episodes ==
Line of Duty series 1 episodes
No. overall	No. in series	Title	Directed by	Written by	Original release date	UK viewers (millions)
1	1	"Episode 1" "A Disastrous Affair"	David Caffrey	Jed Mercurio	26 June 2012	3.76
A police raid on the wrong flat causes the death of an innocent man. DS Arnott refuses to help cover it up and is recruited to AC-12, an anti-corruption team led by Superintendent Hastings. Arnott's first investigation is on DCI Gates, the senior officer of TO-20, who is suspected of laddering – adding additional charges to the same defendant to increase the number of successful cases. Hastings interviews Gates about his failure to report accepting a free breakfast. Gates reassures his mistress, Jackie Laverty, after she claims to have hit a dog while drink driving. Laverty reports her car stolen, and Gates helps fake a break-in at her home. He later discovers that Laverty killed a man. Fleming, currently undercover, requests to join Gates's team. TO-20 stakes-out two suspected drug dealers, but Cottan and Kapoor leave their post early and the two dealers are found murdered, with their fingers cut off. Laverty makes a statement about the hit and run to a civilian police employee but fails to disclose her role. When the victim is identified as Laverty's accountant at her business Laverty Holdings, Gates deletes the missing persons report – but not before Arnott manages to take a look.
2	2	"Episode 2" "The Assault"	David Caffrey	Jed Mercurio	3 July 2012	3.84
TO-20 continues their investigation into the double murder. PC Bannerjee and PC Larkin respond to an alarm and catch a burglar, Lee Plater, who confesses to multiple other offences under coercion. Arnott interviews the waitress who gave Gates the free breakfast, and she reveals that a woman was with Gates. A search on the police database reveals that many burglaries committed by Plater were at properties owned by Laverty Holdings. After visiting one of these properties, Arnott suspects that Laverty is laundering money. The investigating team realise that the dealers' murderers cannot have found what they were looking for but find an empty secret hiding place where they suspect the drugs may have been stashed. Gates confronts Laverty over the death of her accountant, and Gates realises that she was laundering money. Gates arrests her, but she persuades him to release her. Another drug dealer is found dead hanging from a lamp post with his fingers cut off, but Fleming realises that Gates has disappeared and informs Arnott. While Gates and Laverty are together in her house, masked intruders knock Gates unconscious, and Laverty is murdered. The intruders place Gates's fingerprints on the murder weapon.
3	3	"Episode 3" "In the Trap"	David Caffrey	Jed Mercurio	10 July 2012	3.80
Arnott arrives at Laverty's house to find Gates claiming that he was already there to arrest Laverty. Gates takes his whisky glass and wipes his prints from the bottle. Arnott hopes to prove that Gates was at Laverty's before she disappeared. Hastings and Arnott bring Gates in for questioning. Gates confirms that Laverty was an old flame, but denies knowledge of the money laundering. The Laverty case is reassigned to DI Ian Buckells. Fleming looks at CCTV from the night of the double murder and suggests the killers circled the area until Cottan and Kapoor left. Gates tries to dispose of the whisky glass from Laverty's house. The murder suspect car is spotted, and Gates and Morton give chase. During the pursuit, Gates is kidnapped and taken to a warehouse where he is shown Laverty's body and told to stay quiet, or the weapon with his fingerprints will be handed to the police. Arnott acts on a tip that the whisky glass is hidden in a storm drain, based on false information that Gates gave to his officers to test their loyalty. Kapoor is forced to leave Gates's team. Arnott messages Hastings and Fleming to tell them he quits.
4	4	"Episode 4" "Terror"	Douglas Mackinnon	Jed Mercurio	17 July 2012	3.87
Fleming suggests to Arnott that the link between Laverty's money laundering scam and Gates may be his children's expensive school fees. The school confirms that Laverty paid the tuition and fees in cash. Arnott agrees to stay with AC-12. Hastings interviews the rest of Gates's squad over the laddering charge. Morton refuses to comment, and Fleming sticks to her cover. During Hastings' interrogation of Cottan, Cottan claims that Gates ordered him and Kapoor to leave the stake-out early. Forensic evidence at the crime scene and Arabic books belonging to the victims leads Gates to make up a cover story regarding a possible terrorism plot. Gates finds the location where he was held, but Laverty's body is gone. He receives a call from 'Tommy', who informs him that he wants Arnott out of the way. Morton catches Fleming with two phones; realising she is an AC-12 mole, he assaults her. Arnott receives a phone call from one of Laverty's tenants claiming to have information linking Gates to the gang. When Arnott arrives at the meeting, he finds Gates colluding with the gang. Arnott is ambushed and tied to a chair while Gates drives away.
5	5	"Episode 5" "The Probation"	Douglas Mackinnon	Jed Mercurio	24 July 2012	3.72
Gates returns to rescue Arnott who believes that Gates is innocent of the murders. With her cover blown, Fleming leaves TO-20. Cottan is assigned to replace Gates on the triple murder case, while Arnott's former Chief Inspector is brought in to oversee the operation into apprehending the suspected terrorists. Fleming interviews Ryan Pilkington, the teenager who acts as a courier for the organised crime group, who denies any knowledge of 'Tommy' or the murder of Laverty. Arnott meets with Gates, who tries to convince Arnott that he was forced to turn rogue by the sequence of events. Hastings agrees to put a tap on the phone network used by 'Tommy' until one of his phone numbers is re-activated. When the phone number is re-activated, Gates, Arnott and Fleming trail 'Tommy' to a golf club. Gates arrests Tommy Hunter, who reveals that his boys were responsible for the murder of Laverty and the three drug dealers. As Arnott and Fleming catch up with them, Gates, realising his career is over, tells Arnott to say that he was killed in the line of duty before committing suicide. After Hunter is arrested, Cottan privately tips him off about the terrorism theory. It is revealed that Cottan was Hunter's golf caddy in the past.

== Production ==
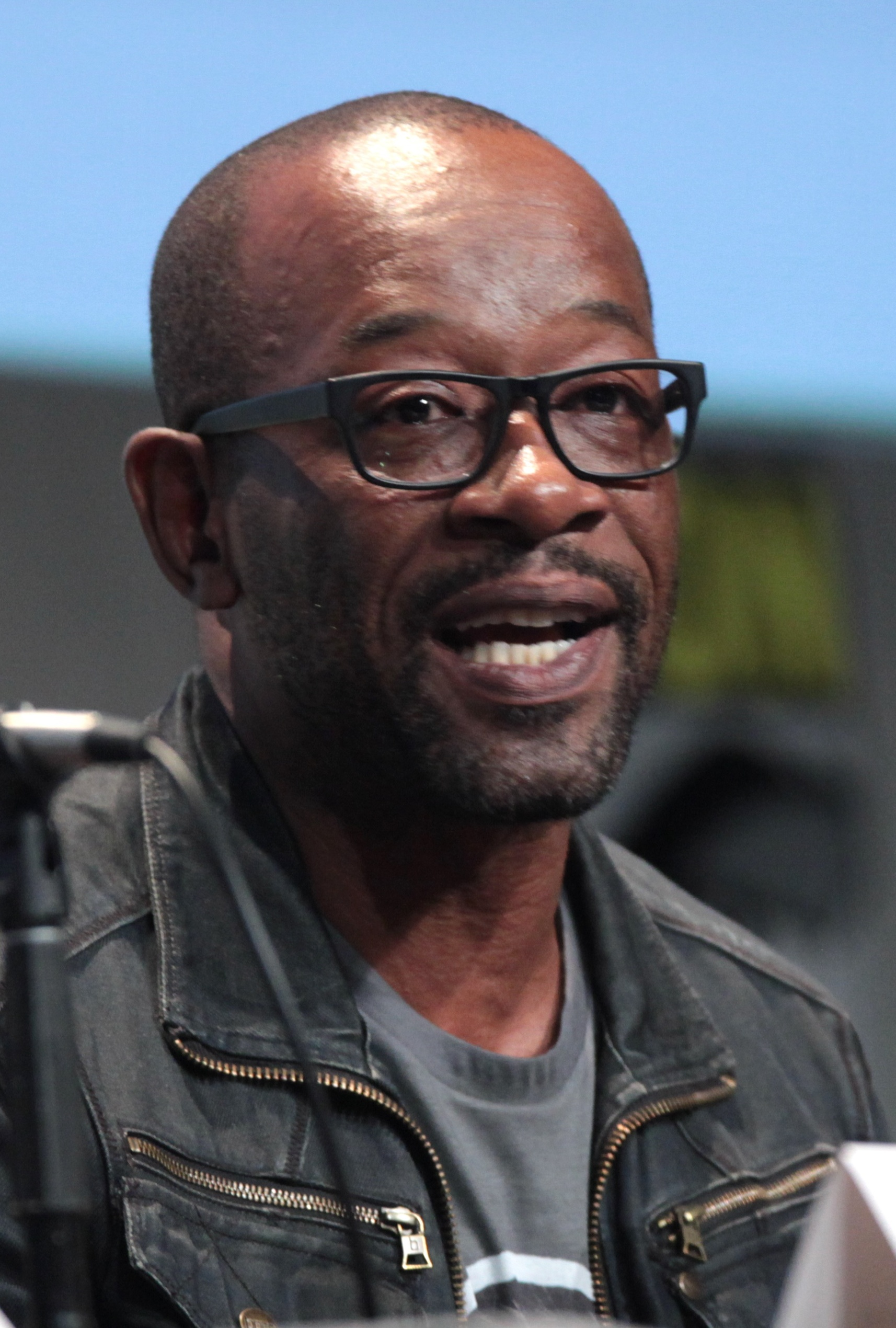
Lennie James starred as DCI Tony Gates

Series creator and producer Jed Mercurio stated that, when creating Line of Duty, he wanted to create something different than other already existing programmes and viewed the series as a "revisionist commentary on 21st-century policing". The series is produced by World Productions. Mercurio originally pitched the series to BBC One who turned him down, believing the series was too "problematic for mainstream audiences," and directed him to BBC Two.

Leading the main cast are Lennie James, playing DCI Tony Gates, as well as Martin Compston and Vicky McClure, who portrayed two officers in the fictional Anti-Corruption Unit 12 (AC-12). James was offered the role without an audition and returned to the UK from Los Angeles for filming. He described his character as morally grey, comparing the concept to the people involved in the Syrian civil war. Compston ultimately played the role of Steve Arnott, having to assume an English accent for the series. While auditioning, McClure read parts of the script with multiple people who were recalled for the role of Arnott and performed extensive research into the police force before portraying of DC Kate Flemming. Gina McKee, Neil Morrissey, Adrian Dunbar, Kate Ashfield, and Craig Parkinson all held supporting roles. Parkinson originally auditioned for the role of Arnott.

Principal photography began in August 2011 with an anticipated airing in early 2012. Five hour-long episodes were directed by David Caffrey and Douglas Mackinnon for BBC Two. Ruairi O'Brien worked as the cinematographer on all five episodes which were filmed over 11 weeks in Birmingham and utilized two cameras. Mercurio later said that, despite filming in Birmingham, the setting was later changed to the Midlands at the advice of the BBC. Following the series broadcast, Ofcom held an industry meeting and censured the BBC for not exercising a "duty of care" for Gregory Piper, a 13-year-old actor who was "exposed to sexually explicit language" and adult situations during production. The BBC responded saying they had acquired permission from Piper's parents to which Ofcom cited their policy of requiring a counsellor or psychologist on set to evaluate the possibility of emotional effects. A second series was commissioned by the BBC on 25 July 2012.

== Release ==
=== Broadcast and streaming ===
On BBC Two the series was first broadcast beginning on 26 June 2012 and concluding five weeks later on 24 July. It was also simulcast on BBC HD. In the United States Line of Duty was released on Hulu weekly between 21 August and 18 September 2012 and was later added to Acorn TV in 2018 and BritBox by 2021. It was also broadcast on the basic cable television network AMC beginning on 4 April 2020. (Note: Acorn TV and AMC are both owned by AMC Networks Inc.) In Canada and Australia the series is available on Netflix. The series was later re-broadcast on BBC One beginning 3 August 2020 due to COVID-19 filming shutdowns delaying production of the sixth season.

=== Home media ===
Line of Duty series 1 home media releases
Name	DVD release dates		Number of episodes	Number of discs
Name	Region 1	Region 2	Number of episodes	Number of discs
Line of Duty - Series One	29 October 2013	3 February 2014	5	2
Line of Duty: Complete Series 1 & 2	—N/a	24 March 2014	11	4
Line Of Duty: Series 1-3	—N/a	2 May 2016	17	6
Line of Duty - Series 1-4	—N/a	8 May 2017	23	8
Line of Duty - Series 1-5 (Note: Titled Line of Duty: Series 1-5 Collection in region one)	26 November 2019	6 May 2019	29	10 (Note: 5 discs in region one)
Line of Duty - Series 1-6 Complete Box Set	—N/a	31 May 2021	36	12

== Reception ==
=== Viewing figures ===
By the time the first series had concluded airing, Line of Duty was the fifth highest-rated series to air on BBC Two since 2002. The series maintained a 15.7% share in consolidated data.

No.	Title	Air date	Overnight ratings	Consolidated ratings		Total viewers (millions)	Ref(s)
No.	Title	Air date	Viewers (millions)	Viewers (millions)	Rank	Total viewers (millions)	Ref(s)
1	Episode 1	26 June 2012	3.35 (Note: 3.14 million on BBC Two, 215,000 on BBC HD)	0.41	1	3.76	
2	Episode 2	3 July 2012	3.12 (Note: 2.91 million on BBC Two, 211,000 on BBC HD)	0.72	2	3.84	
3	Episode 3	10 July 2012	3.13 (Note: 2.93 million on BBC Two, 207,000 on BBC HD)	0.67	1	3.80	
4	Episode 4	17 July 2012	3.23 (Note: 2.97 million on BBC Two, 263,000 on BBC HD)	0.64	1	3.87	
5	Episode 5	24 July 2012	3.30 (Note: 3.06 million on BBC Two, 263,000 on BBC HD)	0.42	1	3.72	

=== Critical response ===
On Rotten Tomatoes, a review aggregator website, the series holds a 100% rating based on five reviews. Metacritic, which uses a weighted average, gives it an 83/100 indicating "critical acclaim". Writing for The A.V. Club, Sonia Saraiya notes that the story being told from a journalistic standpoint with minimal backstory, and the use of a small main cast, make for a unique series. Reviewing the series as a whole, The Guardian's Rhik Samadder opines that it's difficult to follow the pacing, stating, "One minute it's Men Behaving Badly, the next someone with Down's syndrome is being slapped in the face."

Sarah Hughes, also with The Guardian, wrote individual episode reviews and says after episode one that it's hard to oppose the character of Tony Gates with the captivating acting from Lennie James. Following episode 3 she writes that Line of Duty performs better in its slower paced episodes compared to action-packed ones. Reviewing the final episode of the series, Hughes reaches the conclusion that it would have been better with more episodes believing some story elements were rushed.

CultBox also published individual episode reviews from Rob Smedley, who stated, "Jed Mercurio has already crafted a police drama that feels as claustrophobic and threatening as a night sharing a cell with a convict and his dog" and that its challenging plot is rewardingly rare for a series in the summer timeslot. Ceri Radford from The Daily Telegraph believes that the difference between the characters' personal and professional lives were balanced properly.

=== Accolades ===
Year	Award	Category	Nominee(s)	Result	Ref(s).
2012	Crime Thriller Awards	TV Dagger	Line of Duty	Nominated	
2012	Royal Television Society Midlands Awards	Best Drama	Line of Duty	Nominated	
2012	Royal Television Society Midlands Awards	Best Male Actor	Lennie James	Nominated	
2012	Royal Television Society Midlands Awards	Best Newcoming Actor	Gregory Piper	Nominated	
2013	Broadcast Magazine Awards	Best Drama Series or Serial	Line of Duty	Nominated	
2013	Broadcasting Press Guild Awards	Best Drama Series	Line of Duty	Nominated	
2013	Broadcasting Press Guild Awards	Best Writer	Jed Mercurio	Nominated	
2013	Royal Television Society Programme Awards	Best Drama Series	Line of Duty	Nominated	
2013	Royal Television Society Programme Awards	Best Male Actor	Lennie James	Nominated	
2013	Royal Television Society Programme Awards	Best Writer	Jed Mercurio	Nominated	
2013	South Bank Sky Arts Award	TV Drama	Line of Duty	Nominated	
