= Line of Duty series 6 =

BBC police procedural TV show, 2021 series

Line of Duty
- Series 6
- DVD cover
- Showrunner: Jed Mercurio
- Starring: Kelly Macdonald; Martin Compston; Vicky McClure; Adrian Dunbar; Anna Maxwell Martin
- No. of episodes: 7

Release
- Original network: BBC One
- Original release: 21 March – 2 May 2021

Series chronology
- ← Previous; Series 5 Next → Series 7

The sixth series of Line of Duty, consisting of seven episodes, began broadcasting on BBC One on 21 March 2021. The story follows the actions of AC-12, led by Superintendent Ted Hastings (Adrian Dunbar) and DI Steve Arnott (Martin Compston), as they investigate DCI Joanne Davidson (Kelly Macdonald) and her team, including former AC-12 officer DI Kate Fleming (Vicky McClure).

== Cast ==
=== Main cast ===
- Kelly Macdonald as DCI/Acting DSU Joanne Davidson
- Martin Compston as DS/DI Steve Arnott
- Vicky McClure as DI Kate Fleming
- Adrian Dunbar as Superintendent Ted Hastings
- Anna Maxwell Martin as DCS Patricia Carmichael

=== Supporting cast ===
- Ace Bhatti as PCC Rohan Sindwhani
- Owen Teale as Chief Constable Philip Osborne
- Elizabeth Rider as DCC Andrea Wise
- Nigel Boyle as DSU Ian Buckells
- Christina Chong as DI Nicola Rogerson
- Perry Fitzpatrick as DS Chris Lomax
- Kwaku Fortune as DS Marks
- Shalom Brune-Franklin as DC Chloe Bishop
- Rosa Escoda as Amanda Yao, police cyber crime expert
- Anneika Rose as PS Farida Jatri
- Sherise Blackman as PS Ruby Jones
- Tara Divina as PC Lisa Patel
- Gregory Piper as PC Ryan Pilkington
- Tommy Jessop as Terry Boyle
- Andi Osho as Gail Vella
- Prasanna Puwanarajah as Nadaraja
- Sara Dylan as Boyle's solicitor
- Amy De Bhrún as Steph Corbett
- Kerri McLean as Deborah Devereux
- Patrick Baladi as Jimmy Lakewell
- Alastair Natkiel as Lee Banks
- Maria Connolly as Alison Merchant, corrupt prison officer
- George Costigan as former CS Patrick Fairbank
- James Nesbitt as former DI Marcus Thurwell
- Steve Oram as the medical counsellor

== Episodes ==
Line of Duty series 6 episodes
No. overall	No. in series	Title	Directed by	Written by	Original release date	UK viewers (millions)
30	1	"Episode 1"	Daniel Nettheim	Jed Mercurio	21 March 2021	13.49
Based at Hillside Lane police station, DCI Joanne Davidson is the Senior Investigating Officer (SIO) of Operation Lighthouse, the investigation into the murder of journalist Gail Vella. Fleming is now in her team. They are tipped off by a covert human intelligence source (CHIS) that someone using the alias Ross Turner had boasted of killing Vella and are given his address. Buckells orders them to wait until the morning. Davidson, whilst in a convoy of armed police speeding to the address, orders it to intercept an apparent hold-up at a betting shop. One suspect is shot dead and the others arrested; the convoy is delayed but Terry Boyle, a man with Down syndrome, who has previously been abused and coerced into helping the organised crime group in earlier series, is eventually arrested. PS Farida Jatri reports her concerns about Davidson to AC-12's DS Steve Arnott, who covertly begins looking into Davidson's conduct with regard to the betting shop hold-up. Neither her team nor Arnott is aware of Davidson's affair with PS Jatri, with whom she has just had a messy break-up. Two sets of fingerprints are found in both Turner's flat and in Boyle's home: those of Boyle and those of Carl Banks, a known criminal. The body of the missing CHIS is discovered. When Hastings gives Arnott the order to investigate Davidson, Arnott goes to inform Fleming, and finishes by saying, "Either you're our CHIS or you're embedded as a UCO (undercover officer). That's why I'm giving you a heads-up, Kate." She does not commit herself.
31	2	"Episode 2"	Daniel Nettheim	Jed Mercurio	28 March 2021	12.45
Arnott and Bishop learn from Nadaraja, Gail Vella's TV producer, that she was developing a podcast about high-level police corruption, and that her home had been ransacked – details Davidson seemingly overlooked – which might indicate an OCG hit. PS Jatri requests a transfer for personal reasons. Her replacement is PC Ryan Pilkington. Carl Banks's body is found in a condition reminiscent of an OCG execution, with a knife nearby containing the dead CHIS's fingerprints. Hastings promotes Arnott to temporary DI. AC-12 raid Hillside Lane to seize evidence for their investigation, but are thwarted when Davidson reveals she put in a request to restrict access to Operation Lighthouse documents, causing a 24-hour delay in the investigation. Arnott and Hastings realise that Fleming tipped Davidson off. After Arnott sees Hastings with Steph Corbett, he drives to her house. She witnesses his suffering and his addiction to painkillers. Davidson is summoned to an AC-12 interview. As she is placed under arrest, Davidson suggests that AC-12 should investigate all who have had access to the CHIS's information. PS Jatri is sent to prison when a search of her house reveals a stash of burner phones. She tearfully insists that she is being framed and reveals her personal relationship with Davidson. Davidson is released; she drives herself to take delivery of another burner phone. Alone in her car, she is distraught.
32	3	"Episode 3"	Gareth Bryn	Jed Mercurio	4 April 2021	12.58
After a witness identifies him as having argued with the deceased CHIS regarding Vella's murder, Boyle is brought in for further questioning. He comes close to sharing new information about a man who "did [the murder]", but Davidson halts the interview. Pilkington, accompanying PC Lisa Patel who is driving Boyle home, diverts to a different route. He forces the car into a reservoir, drowns Patel, and attempts to drown Boyle. Fleming had been tailing them and arrives in time to thwart him. She notices a window in the vehicle where Pilkington was sitting is open, and reports her findings to AC-12. Arnott recognises Pilkington and Fleming remembers interviewing him as a juvenile, in connection with the Tony Gates AC-12 case. Steph tells Hastings of Arnott's painkiller addiction; Arnott makes an unsuccessful attempt to get clean. He spends a platonic night with Steph. When she leaves to go to work, he searches her house; discovering a large amount of money in the loft. After Boyle's freezer is found in a dump, samples of Jackie Laverty's blood are found inside. In Brentiss Prison, Jatri is prevented from attending an AC-12 interview when an OCG warder breaks her wrist. DSU Buckells and Deborah Devereux, the witness who named Boyle, have had a sexual relationship. Buckells is handed over to AC-12. At home, Davidson messages an unknown individual on a laptop that everything has been taken care of.
33	4	"Episode 4"	Gareth Bryn	Jed Mercurio	11 April 2021	12.77
Buckells is interviewed by AC-12 and charged. Wise informs Hastings she intends to merge AC-12, AC-3 and AC-9 to form one unit and to reduce the staff by 90% and that he should take retirement to avoid further disciplinary action. A betting shop robber is interviewed by Lomax and Fleming in gathering more information about firearms. As forensic analysis at Jatri's home is completed, Davidson watches before sending another message through her laptop, "I'm finished". Arnott asks DI Rogerson to hold off. He deletes emails from Occupational Health about discussing his drug test. Arnott recognises the voice of jailed solicitor Jimmy Lakewell on a recording obtained from Vella's office. Davidson tells Pilkington she will complete his commendation and then discharge him from her team. When Arnott and Bishop interview Lakewell in prison, he is afraid to talk. In moving him into secure custody, the OCG ambush the convoy. In the shootout, PS Ruby Jones is killed by a sniper, whom Arnott then kills with his handgun. Pilkington explains to Davidson why he will not be removed from Operation Lighthouse. Lakewell is murdered by OCG prisoner Lee Banks in his prison cell as Buckells watches. Forensic results from Jatri's house reveal Davidson's fingerprints were found, but that a DNA test found a match to a nominal located on other police databases.
34	5	"Episode 5"	Jennie Darnell	Jed Mercurio	18 April 2021	13.72
Arnott and Bishop examine the cell where Lakewell was found "hanged", and are frustrated at having no CCTV footage. Arnott tells Bishop to look into Lawrence Christopher, the case that Vella was investigating before her death. Lomax debriefs Fleming and Davidson on the potential locations where workshopped firearms may have been made. Fleming meets AC-12 and is shocked to learn that Davidson has a partial DNA match to Tommy Hunter, the results indicating this arose from incest. The team watch a press briefing by Osborne, after which Hastings learns from Sindwhani that he should continue to investigate the situation before his retirement. Arnott discovers that the missing £50k from their last case was given to Steph Corbett by Hastings, which he reveals to Fleming. MIT run a sting operation against the sites investigated by Fleming, only to find that the first is empty. Pilkington is observed by AC-12 using a concealed phone to contact the OCG, two members of which attempt to remove the machinery, but are killed by AC-12 AFOs. Fleming is informed of the actions of Pilkington but no arrest is made. Bishop explains to Hastings and Arnott about the Christopher case, leading Arnott to discover that Thurwell was involved in a previous AC-12 case about child sexual exploitation at Sands View, which was covered up. Davidson attempts to force Fleming to submit a transfer request but she refuses, annoying Davidson who is under orders to "get rid of her". Arnott tries questioning Fairbank but gets nowhere; back at the office, Bishop tells him that Vella tried to interview many of AC-12's former adversaries such as Manish Prasad, Hari Bains and Roz Huntley, but only Lee Banks had agreed to talk. Arnott talks to Banks and learns of Hastings's involvement in "tipping off" the OCG about a rat in their team. Davidson lures Fleming to a disused industrial site, but Fleming also tells Arnott. He is delayed due to the arrival of DCS Patricia Carmichael; while AC-12 are en route, Fleming and Pilkington have a stand off with weapons drawn. Two shots are fired.
35	6	"Episode 6"	Jennie Darnell	Jed Mercurio	25 April 2021	14.89
AC-12 arrive at the industrial estate to find Pilkington's body, with two gunshot wounds to the chest. Having fled the scene, Fleming and Davidson go to Arnott's home and take his car. Davidson shows Fleming the shuttered print shop opposite Boyle's flat, and tells her to search it. They are immediately ambushed by police vehicles, and reluctantly surrender. Carmichael assumes control of AC-12, and reveals to Hastings that they were detected so quickly because AC-12 vehicles have tracking devices, as neither she nor Chief Constable Osborne trust them. Davidson is interviewed first, and although she is shaken to learn the truth of her parentage, she initially gives 'no comment' answers. She also covers for Fleming by lying that she had shot Pilkington whilst disarming her. As questioning continues, Davidson shares details of being coerced by the OCG, although Carmichael repeatedly tries to steer away from this subject. Carmichael terminates the interview, and Davidson is charged. Fleming is released, now the most senior officer in the MIT, and she and Arnott order the floor to the weapons workshop to be excavated. Bishop calls them back to AC-12, where police in Spain are raiding Thurwell's suspected residence. They find two decomposing bodies. In prison, as Davidson is being taken to her cell, she is confronted by two OCG prison guards, who note the two CCTV cameras monitoring the entrance to her cell and retreat.
36	7	"Episode 7"	Jennie Darnell	Jed Mercurio	2 May 2021	15.79
A lockbox is discovered beneath the floor of the workshop, containing the weapons used to kill Vella, Laverty and former AC-12 officer Maneet Bindra. Arnott finally meets Occupational Health. Davidson is unexpectedly taken to a prison transport van, seemingly for further interview. An order for her elimination from the "Fourth Man" is obtained by AC-12, who intercept the van and arrest the OCG hitmen and prison guards. Davidson is offered witness protection, and names Fairbank as her believed father. The Fourth Man is finally identified as Buckells, who declares that he will take immunity and witness protection, and admits that he has been the OCG's point man for years, passing on orders to other corrupt officers. However, he is informed that he will be ineligible for either immunity or witness protection, and is arrested. After being confronted by his team, Hastings confesses to giving bribe money to Steph Corbett. He tells Carmichael that it was due to wilful institutional blindness that Buckells was able to be promoted so far, despite his apparent incompetence and actual corruption. He also confesses to accidentally tipping off the OCG about Corbett. In an epilogue, Social Services rehouses Boyle, charges against Jatri are dropped, and Davidson begins a new life in Witness Protection with a new girlfriend. Darren Hunter is investigated for his part in the murder of Christopher. Osborne seeks public interest immunity for proceedings against Buckells, in order to prevent evidence of institutional corruption from being heard in court, and his structural overhaul of anticorruption units proceeds, weakening AC-12's abilities.

== Background, production and release ==
On 5 May 2017, Line of Duty was renewed by the BBC for a fifth and sixth series. The fifth series began broadcasting on 31 March 2019, and finished on 5 May. In November 2019, it was announced that Kelly Macdonald would join the cast of the sixth series. Filming took place in Belfast, beginning in February 2020, but stopped the following month due to the COVID-19 pandemic, before resuming in September and finishing in November. The sixth series is over seven episodes rather than the usual six.

We have taken lots of precautions for cast and crew. We have filmed on studio sets which is a departure from previous series where we have shot in an actual working building. The reason why is because we can ventilate the set and social distance our cast and crew. We have had rigorous measures in place during the shoot.

— Creator Jed Mercurio on filming during the COVID-19 pandemic

On 5 March 2021, Vicky McClure and Adrian Dunbar appeared on The Graham Norton Show to promote the sixth series, and the full-length trailer was released on 9 March. The series's initial broadcast date was brought forward because of its popularity, with some episodes still being in post-production only days before the premiere of the first episode.

The sixth series was released on DVD and Blu-ray on 31 May 2021.

=== Distribution ===
Following Kew Media's collapse in early 2020, it was announced that ITV Studios would be handling global sales and distribution for Line of Duty's sixth series. BritBox exclusively premiered the sixth series in both the United States and Canada on 18 May 2021.

== Reception ==
=== Viewing figures ===
The series averaged 9.9 million viewers and maintained a 46.1% share. The penultimate episode was the highest overnight audience for a BBC drama since Doctor Who's 2008 Christmas special, "Voyage of the Damned", which was viewed by 11.7 million. The finale episode peaked at 13.1 million with a 15.8% share in its final 15 minutes. This caused Line of Duty to be the highest rated drama since modern records began in 2002. Across all channels and other genres (Note: Includes reality, comedy, and variety programming; excludes news and sports.) it was the fifth highest rated broadcast since 2014 when those records began. Appreciation Index (AI) ratings for all seven episodes fell within ten percent of each other. The AI for the finale rated seven points higher than the premiere.

No.	Title	Air date	Overnight ratings	Consolidated ratings		Total viewers (millions)	Ref(s)
No.	Title	Air date	Viewers (millions)	Viewers (millions)	Rank	Total viewers (millions)	Ref(s)
1	Episode 1	21 March 2021	9.60	3.89	1	13.49	
2	Episode 2	28 March 2021	8.90	3.55	1	12.45	
3	Episode 3	4 April 2021	8.60	3.98	1	12.58	
4	Episode 4	11 April 2021	8.50	4.27	1	12.77	
5	Episode 5	18 April 2021	9.92	3.80	1	13.72	
6	Episode 6	25 April 2021	10.90	3.99	1	14.89	
7	Episode 7	2 May 2021	12.80	2.99	1	15.79	

=== Critical response ===
The review aggregator Rotten Tomatoes gave the series an 84% approval rating, with an average of 7.20/10, based on 25 reviews. The critical consensus reads, "Unnecessarily dense storytelling and an oversaturation of acronyms gives the sense that this sturdy procedural may be overextending itself, but Kelly Macdonald reports in for duty to provide some fresh blood and intrigue.”. On Metacritic, the series has a weighted average score of 85 out of 100 based on 5 reviews, indicating "universal acclaim”.

Episode 1

The Guardian's Lucy Mangan gave the first episode a rating of four out of five, writing that the show "seems just as good, if not better, than ever", while Anita Singh of The Daily Telegraph gave it the same rating, stating that the episode "played to all of Line of Duty's strengths – taut, edge-of-the-seat stuff." Ed Cumming of The Independent gave it five out of five, noting that the "first episode of series six returns to what Line of Duty does best". Carol Midgley of The Times, however, criticised the series debut, describing it as "wilfully turgid".

Episode 2

The Daily Telegraph's Singh dropped her rating for the second episode to two out of five, describing it as "exhausting" and "frustrating", while Midgley of The Times saw it as a "slight" improvement on the first episode, though still a "little dull".

Episode 3

Both Singh of The Daily Telegraph and Midgley of The Times awarded the third episode three out of five, with the former stating that it saw the series "heating up nicely", and the latter writing that "there was more intrigue in episode three than in the previous two combined".

Episode 4

The fourth episode was well received. Singh of The Daily Telegraph gave a perfect rating and described it as an "absolute belter" delivered after "three lacklustre weeks". Similarly, Louisa Mellor of Den of Geek praised the episode, and described the ambush scene as "tremendous television". In the Radio Times, David Butcher stated that the episode is "Line of Duty at its best", and Midgley of The Times awarded a rating of four out of five.

Episode 7

The final episode received mixed reviews. Rachel Cooke with the New Statesman said that the series "ended with a whimper, not a bang". Lucy Mangan of The Guardian gave episode seven a three out of five rating. Harry Fletcher of Metro gave the same rating. The Times' Ben Dowell gave the episode a four out of five rating, as did Singh of The Daily Telegraph, describing it as "genuine edge-of-the-seat stuff".

=== Accolades ===
Year	Award	Category	Nominee(s)	Result	Ref(s).
2021	Australian Directors' Guild Awards	Best Direction in a Television Miniseries	Daniel Nettheim for "Episode 1"	Nominated	
2021	British Academy Television Scotland Awards	Actress Television	Kelly McDonald	Nominated	
2021	British Academy Television Scotland Awards	Audience Award	Kelly McDonald	Nominated	
2021	British Academy Television Scotland Awards	Audience Award	Martin Compston	Nominated	
2021	Irish Film & Television Awards	Best Drama	Line of Duty	Nominated	
2021	Irish Film & Television Awards	Lead Actor in a Drama	Adrian Dunbar	Nominated	
2021	National Television Awards	Best Returning Drama	Line of Duty	Won	
2021	National Television Awards	Best Drama Performance	Martin Compston	Nominated	
2021	National Television Awards	Best Drama Performance	Adrian Dunbar	Nominated	
2021	National Television Awards	Best Drama Performance	Vicky McClure	Nominated	
2021	National Television Awards	Special Recognition	Line of Duty	Won	
2021	TV Choice Awards	Best Drama	Line of Duty	Won	
2021	TV Choice Awards	Best Actor	Martin Compston	Won	
2021	TV Choice Awards	Best Actor	Adrian Dunbar	Nominated	
2021	TV Choice Awards	Best Actress	Vicky McClure	Won	
2021	TVTimes Awards	Favourite Drama	Line of Duty	Won	
2021	TVTimes Awards	Favourite Actor	Martin Compston	Nominated	
2021	TVTimes Awards	Favourite Actress	Vicky McClure	Nominated	
2022	British Academy Television Craft Awards	Best Editing: Fiction	Andrew John McClelland	Nominated	
2022	British Academy Television Craft Awards	Original Music	Carly Paradis	Nominated	
2022	British Academy Television Craft Awards	Best Sound: Fiction	Pietro Dalmasso, Ronan Hill, Paul Maynes, and Ian Wilkinson	Nominated	
2022	British Academy Television Cymru Awards	Director - Fiction	Gareth Bryn	Nominated	
2022	Broadcasting Press Guild Awards	Best Drama Series	Line of Duty	Nominated	
2022	Celtic Media Festival Awards	Best Drama	Line of Duty	Nominated	
2022	DIVA Awards	Media Moment of the Year	Line of Duty	Won	
2022	Royal Television Society Northern Ireland Awards	Drama	Line of Duty	Nominated	
2022	Royal Television Society Northern Ireland Awards	Original Music	Carly Paradis	Nominated	
2022	Satellite Awards	Best Drama Series	Line of Duty	Nominated	
2022	Satellite Awards	Best Actress in a Drama Series	Kelly McDonald	Nominated	
