= John Strickland =

British film and television director

- Occupation: Film/television director
- Years active: 1982–present

John Strickland is a British film and television director.

Some of his credits include The Murder of Princess Diana, Maigret, The Bill, Clocking Off, Trust, P.O.W., Bodies, Hustle, Apparitions, Bedlam, Line of Duty, The Rig and the American series Big Love. His only full length feature film and cinema release to date is G:MT – Greenwich Mean Time, released on 1st October in 1999.
