= Broadcasting Press Guild =

British association of journalists

- Type: Journalist association
- Industry: Entertainment industry
- Founded: 1974
- Headquarters: London, United Kingdom
- Key people: Manori Ravindran (Chair), Kate Bulkley (Awards Chair)

The Broadcasting Press Guild (BPG) is a British association of journalists dedicated to the topic of general media issues.

== History ==
The Guild was established in 1974 as a breakaway of The Critics' Circle and celebrated its 50th anniversary in 2024. Its membership includes more than 100 staff and freelance journalists who write and broadcast about TV, radio, streaming and the media for UK national newspapers, specialist journals and online outlets.

One of the Guild's most recognized activities is the hosting of luncheons where leading industry figures are engaged in dialogue. The Guild has entertained most BBC director-generals and chairs and government ministers responsible for broadcasting along with a wide range of top executives from TV and radio channels in the UK and overseas. Previous lunch speakers include Sally Wainwright, Peter Fincham, David Abraham, Charlotte Moore, John Whittingdale, Chris Patten, Jeremy Hunt, Greg Dyke, Kevin Lygo, Carolyn McCall, Michael Grade, Martin Sorrell, Mark Thompson and Gary Lineker.

== Awards ==
- BPG TV & Radio Awards — Presented annually since 1974 to recognize outstanding programmes and performances in British television and radio, the awards ceremony is considered an important media event in Britain. Since 2010 the sponsors have included Dave, Virgin Media, Discovery, Pact, BBC Studios, Netflix and Prime Video.
- Harvey Lee Award for Outstanding Contribution to Broadcasting — Awarded since 1992 and named after the British journalist Harvey Lee, who was also Secretary and Chairman of the BPG. Recipients include Denis Forman, David Frost, Terry Wogan, Lenny Henry and Moira Stuart

The BPG’s Best Actress winners include Diana Rigg, Eileen Atkins, Helen Mirren, Peggy Ashcroft, Gillian Anderson, Vanessa Redgrave, Maxine Peake, Anne-Marie Duff, Zoe Wanamaker, Gina McKee, Julie Walters, Olivia Colman and Juliet Stevenson.

The BPG Best Actor award has been presented to Alec Guinness, Albert Finney, Kenneth Branagh, Colin Firth, Charles Dance, Robert Hardy, Jim Broadbent, Christopher Ecclestone, Benedict Cumberbatch, Ben Whishaw and Dominic West among others.

Complete list of all the BPG Awards winners, year-by-year

== In the news ==
It is common for major media announcements or changes in policy to be made at the BPG's luncheons. In 2012, Richard Klein, the BBC Four Controller, announced the network would be pulling broadcasts of Top of the Pops re-runs in the wake of the Jimmy Savile scandal. At the same event, Klein announced that the network had purchased the broadcast rights for the NBC comedy series Parks and Recreation.

In a 2012 luncheon, Lord Patten announced that some BBC freelancers, including Fiona Bruce and Graham Norton, would be offered staff contracts following a review of the BBC's tax arrangements, while at the same time denying that the broadcaster had engaged in tax dodging. During the same event, Patten also broke his silence about the Jimmy Savile scandal, clarifying widespread allegations of a corporate cover-up.

Speakers sometimes make news during the annual BPG Awards ceremony. In 2016, the former Doctor Who boss Russell T Davies criticised the lack of gay characters on TV.

At a BPG lunch in 2024, Gary Lineker discussed his Goalhanger podcast productions and the controversy over his Twitter pronouncements.

To mark its 50th anniversary in 2024, the Guild invited its members to choose their Top 50 Landmark TV Programmes. The top spot went to the ‘7 Up’ series of documentaries started by Granada Television in 1964.
