= Danny Cohen (cinematographer) =

English cinematographer

- Born: Daniel Cohen; 1963 (age 62–63); London, England
- Years active: 1994–present

Daniel Cohen, BSC (born 1963) is an English cinematographer.

== Early life ==
Daniel Cohen was born in London in 1963. Cohen studied social science at Sheffield Polytechnic (now Sheffield Hallam University).

== Career ==
Cohen began his professional career as a photographic technician at Middlesex Polytechnic.

He subsequently spent eight years working as a camera assistant across various documentaries, adverts and feature films.

Cohen had a long-term collaboration with director Tom Hooper, receiving a nomination for the Academy Award for Best Cinematography with The King's Speech.

== Filmography ==
=== Short film ===
Year	Title	Director	Notes
1998	The Snatching of Bookie Bob	John Sharian	
1999	Wiper	Marc Charach	
2001	My Other Wheelchair Is a Porsche	Ravi Kumar	
2002	About Time 2	Mike Figgis	Segment of Ten Minutes Older: The Cello
2002	My Wrongs 8245–8249 & 117	Chris Morris	
2004	Old Street	Angus Jackson	
2005	Rob of the Rovers	Ashley Horner	
2006	Scummy Man	Paul Fraser	
2011	Jess//Jim	Luke Snellin	

=== Feature film ===
Year	Title	Director
2000	Dead Babies	William Marsh
2004	Only Human	Dominic Harari; Teresa Pelegri
2004	Creep	Christopher Smith
2004	Dead Man's Shoes	Shane Meadows
2005	Festival	Annie Griffin
2005	Pierrepoint	Adrian Shergold
2005	33X Around the Sun	John Hardwick
2006	This Is England	Shane Meadows
2009	The Boat That Rocked	Richard Curtis
2009	Glorious 39	Stephen Poliakoff
2010	The King's Speech	Tom Hooper
2011	Johnny English Reborn	Oliver Parker
2012	Les Misérables	Tom Hooper
2014	X+Y	Morgan Matthews
2015	London Road	Rufus Norris
2015	Room	Lenny Abrahamson
2015	The Danish Girl	Tom Hooper
2015	The Program	Stephen Frears
2016	Florence Foster Jenkins	Stephen Frears
2017	Final Portrait	Stanley Tucci
2017	Victoria & Abdul	Stephen Frears
2017	Disobedience	Sebastián Lelio
2018	King of Thieves	James Marsh
2020	Downhill	Nat Faxon; Jim Rash
2020	Eurovision Song Contest: The Story of Fire Saga	David Dobkin
2026	Onwards and Sideways	John Madden

=== Television ===
Year	Title	Director	Notes
1999-2001	Shockers	David Blair; Bharat Nalluri	Episodes "Ibiza - £99 Return" and "Cyclops"
2003	The Book Group	Annie Griffin	Season 2
2005	Nathan Barley	Chris Morris	All 6 episodes
2005	Murder in Suburbia	Roger Goldby	2 episodes
2012	The Hollow Crown	Rupert Goold	Episode "Richard II"
2022-2025	Slow Horses	James Hawes; Saul Metzstein; Adam Randall	Series 1, 3, 4 and 5

TV movies

Year	Title	Director
2001	Baited Breath	Jon Wilson
2002	Daddy's Girl	Bill Eagles
2006	Longford	Tom Hooper
2006	Born Equal	Dominic Savage
2007	Coming Down the Mountain	Julie Anne Robinson
2007	Joe's Palace	Stephen Poliakoff
2007	A Real Summer	Stephen Poliakoff
2007	Capturing Mary	Stephen Poliakoff
2008	Poppy Shakespeare	Benjamin Ross
2010	Dive	Dominic Savage
2019	Brexit: The Uncivil War	Toby Haynes
2026	But When We Dance	John Madden

Miniseries

Year	Title	Director	Notes
2002	Menace	Bill Eagles	
2008	John Adams	Tom Hooper	Episodes "Don't Tread on Me" and "Reunion" (With Tak Fujimoto)
2010	This Is England '86	Tom Harper; Shane Meadows	2 episodes
2011	This Is England '88	Shane Meadows	
2018	A Very English Scandal	Stephen Frears	
2023	The Gallows Pole	Shane Meadows	

Documentary film

Year	Title	Director	Notes
2008	Portraits of a Lady	Neil Leifer	With Peter Franchella and Howie Leifer

=== Music video ===
Year	Title	Artist	Director
2006	Leave Before the Lights Come On	Arctic Monkeys	John Hardwick
2018	Pink Lemonade	James Bay	Philip Andelman
2024	Under the Tree	Ed Sheeran	Richard Curtis

== Accolades ==
Year	Award	Category	Title	Result
2010	Academy Awards	Best Cinematography	The King's Speech	Nominated
2010	American Society of Cinematographers	Outstanding Achievement in Cinematography	The King's Speech	Nominated
2012	American Society of Cinematographers	Outstanding Achievement in Cinematography	Les Misérables	Nominated
2010	BAFTA Awards	Best Cinematography	The King's Speech	Nominated
2012	BAFTA Awards	Best Cinematography	Les Misérables	Nominated
2008	Primetime Emmy Awards	Outstanding Cinematography for a Limited Series (For episode "Don't Tread on Me")	John Adams	Nominated
