= 59th British Academy Film Awards =

2006 film award ceremony

- Date: 19 February 2006
- Site: Odeon Leicester Square, London
- Hosted by: Stephen Fry

Highlights
- Best Film: Brokeback Mountain
- Best British Film: Wallace & Gromit: The Curse of the Were-Rabbit
- Best Actor: Philip Seymour Hoffman; Capote
- Best Actress: Reese Witherspoon; Walk the Line
- Most awards: Brokeback Mountain (4)
- Most nominations: The Constant Gardener (10)

The 59th British Academy Film Awards, more commonly known as the BAFTAs, took place on 19 February 2006 at the Odeon Leicester Square in London, honouring the best national and foreign films of 2005. Presented by the British Academy of Film and Television Arts, accolades were handed out for the best feature-length film and documentaries of any nationality that were screened at British cinemas in 2005.

Brokeback Mountain won Best Film, Best Director for Ang Lee, Best Supporting Actor for Jake Gyllenhaal, and Best Adapted Screenplay. Philip Seymour Hoffman won Best Actor for Capote and Reese Witherspoon won Best Actress for Walk the Line. The Constant Gardener received the most nominations with 10; the film only received one award: Best Editing for Claire Simpson. Wallace & Gromit: The Curse of the Were-Rabbit, directed by Nick Park and Steve Box, was voted Outstanding British Film of 2005.

Stephen Fry hosted the ceremony for the fifth consecutive year.

== Winners and nominees ==
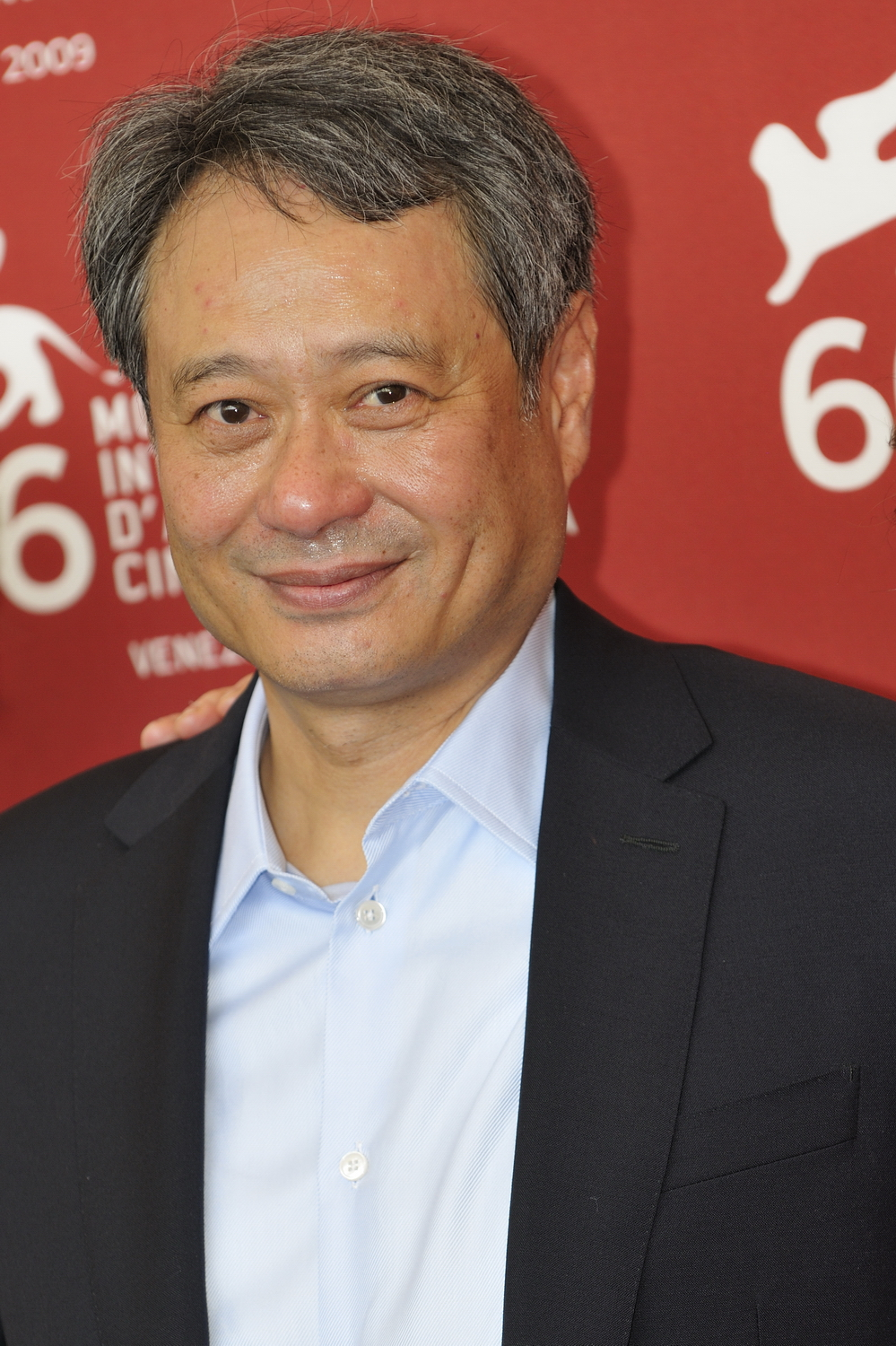
Ang Lee, Best Director winner

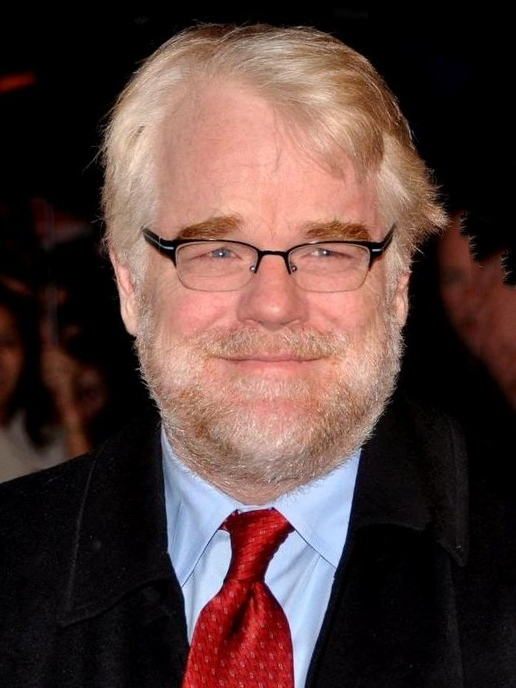
Philip Seymour Hoffman, Best Actor winner

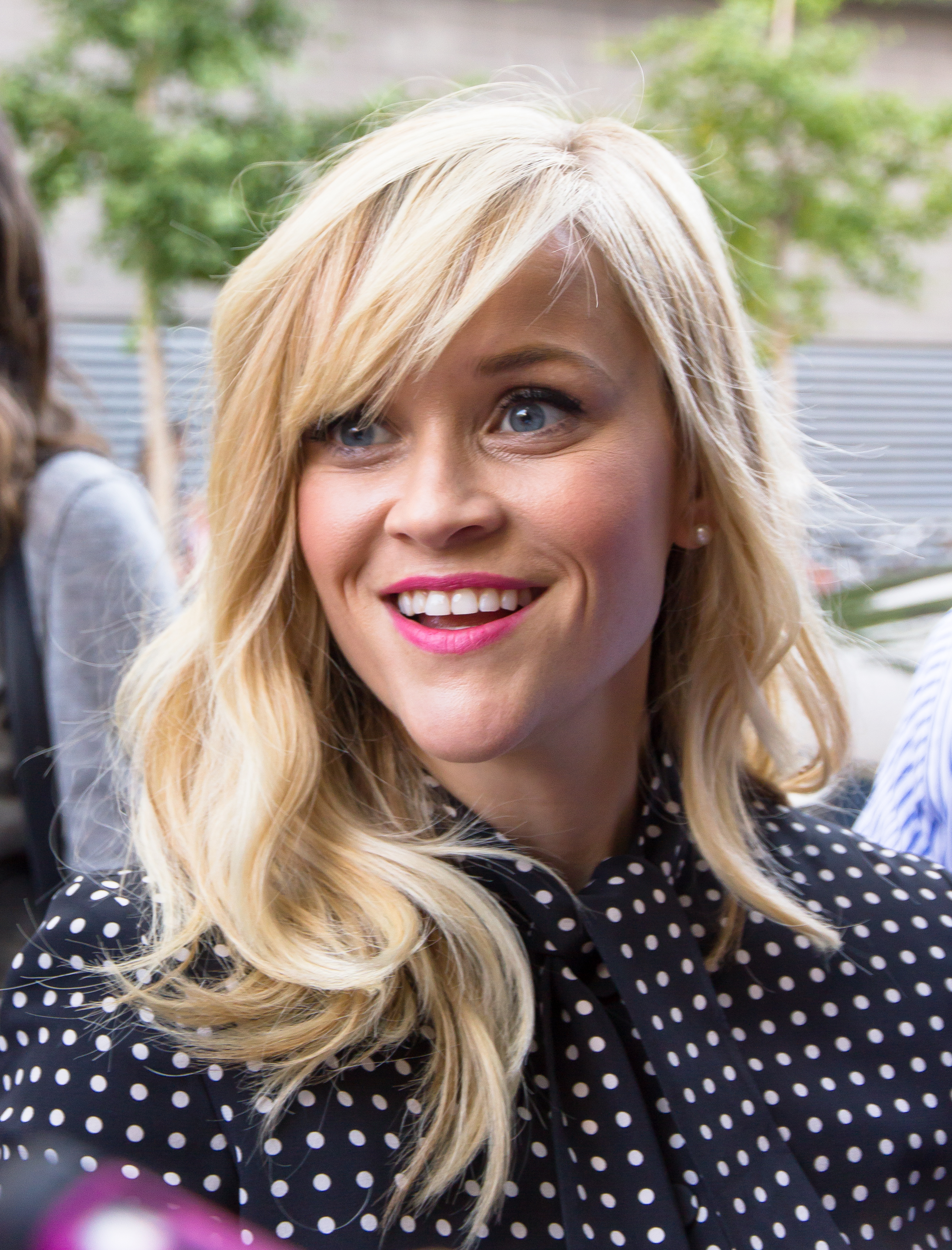
Reese Witherspoon, Best Actress winner

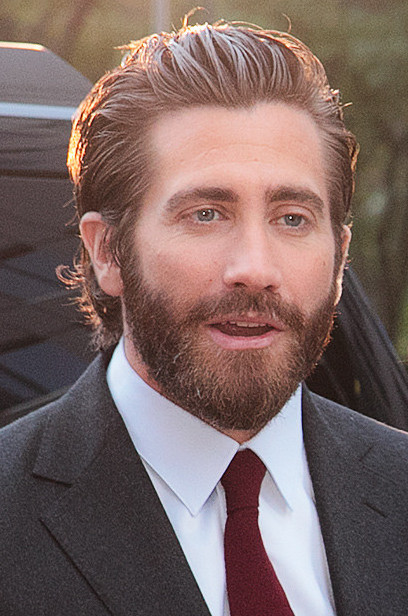
Jake Gyllenhaal, Best Supporting Actor winner

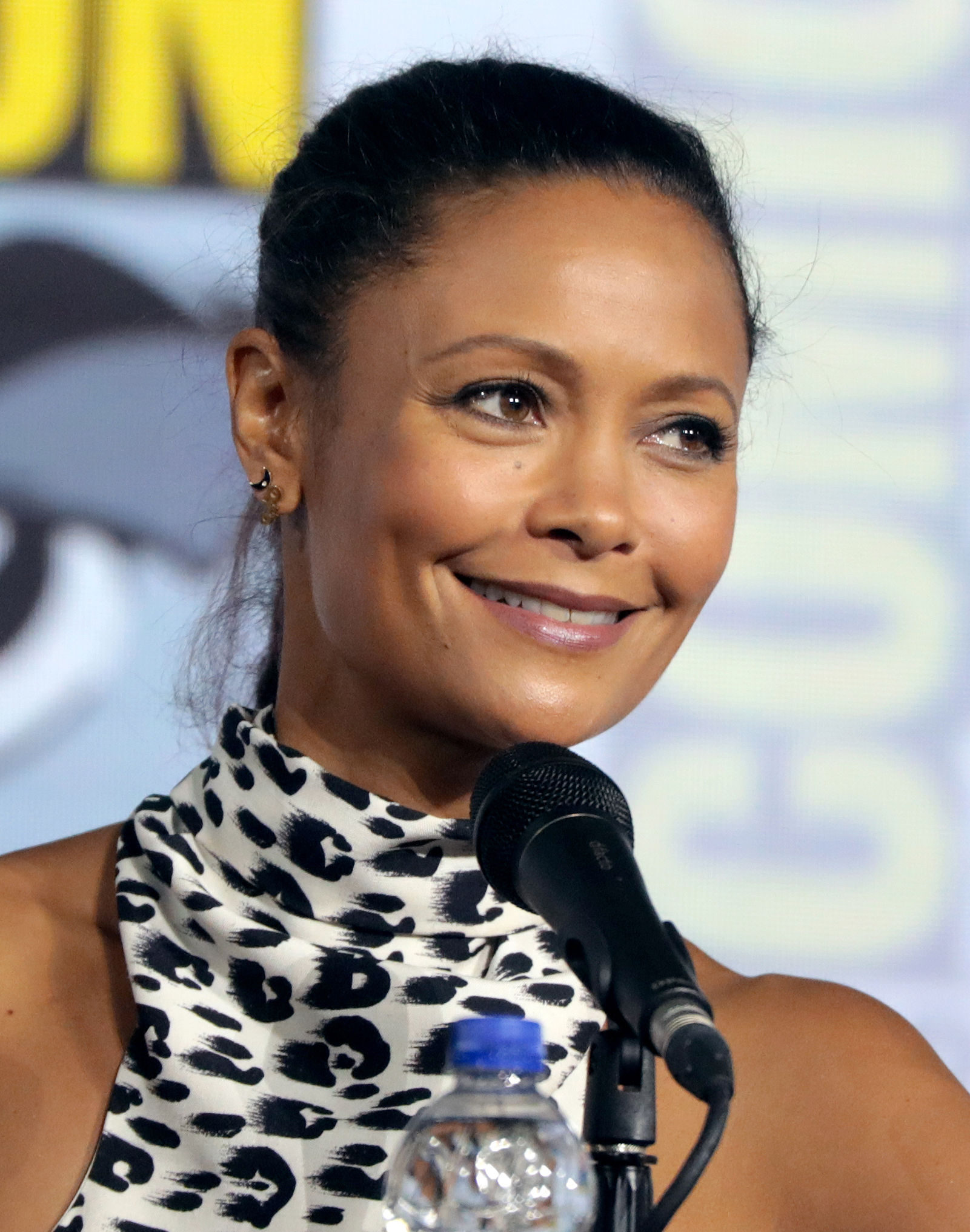
Thandiwe Newton, Best Supporting Actress winner

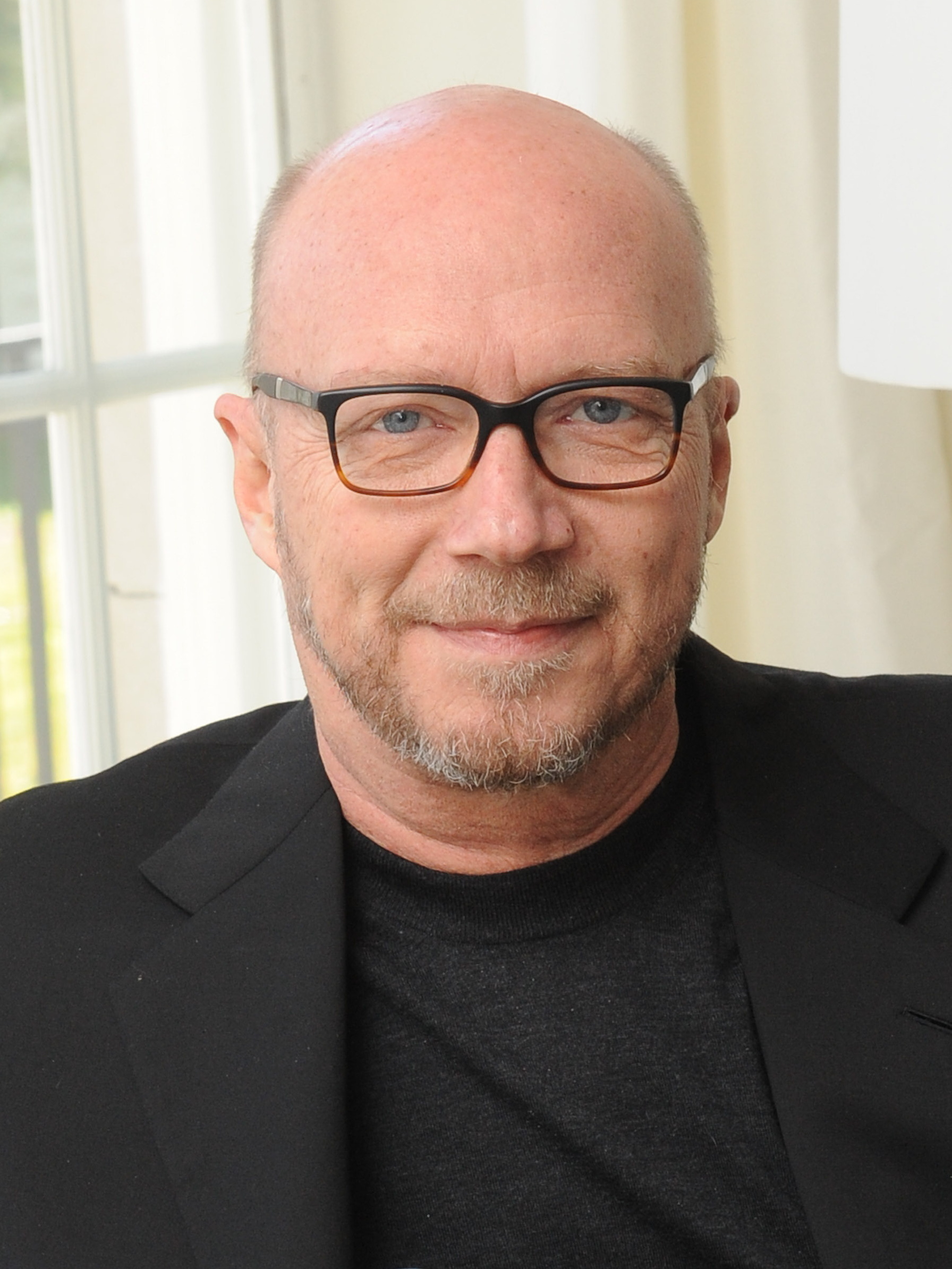
Paul Haggis, Best Original Screenplay co-winner

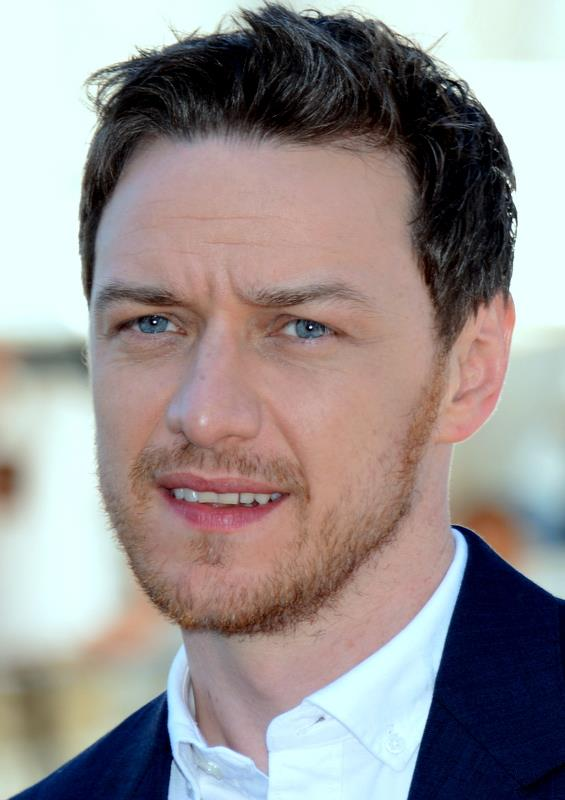
James McAvoy, Orange Rising Star Award winner

=== BAFTA Fellowship ===
- **David Puttnam**

=== Outstanding British Contribution to Cinema ===
- **Robert 'Chuck' Finch** and **Billy Merrell**

=== Awards ===
Winners are listed first and highlighted in boldface.

**Best Film**: **Brokeback Mountain – Diana Ossana and James Schamus**; Capote – Caroline Baron, William Vince and Michael Ohoven; The Constant Gardener – Simon Channing Williams; Crash – Cathy Schulman, Don Cheadle and Bob Yari; Good Night, and Good Luck – Grant Heslov	**Best Direction**: **Ang Lee – Brokeback Mountain**; George Clooney – Good Night, and Good Luck; Paul Haggis – Crash; Fernando Meirelles – The Constant Gardener; Bennett Miller – Capote
**Best Actor in a Leading Role**: **Philip Seymour Hoffman – Capote as Truman Capote**; Ralph Fiennes – The Constant Gardener as Justin Quayle; Heath Ledger – Brokeback Mountain as Ennis Del Mar; Joaquin Phoenix – Walk the Line as Johnny Cash; David Strathairn – Good Night, and Good Luck as Edward R. Murrow	**Best Actress in a Leading Role**: **Reese Witherspoon – Walk the Line as June Carter Cash**; Judi Dench – Mrs Henderson Presents as Laura Henderson; Charlize Theron – North Country as Josey Aimes; Rachel Weisz – The Constant Gardener as Tessa Abbott-Quayle; Ziyi Zhang – Memoirs of a Geisha as Chiyo Sakamoto / Sayuri Nitta
**Best Actor in a Supporting Role**: **Jake Gyllenhaal – Brokeback Mountain as Jack Twist**; Don Cheadle – Crash as Detective Graham Waters; George Clooney – Good Night, and Good Luck as Fred W. Friendly; George Clooney – Syriana as Bob Barnes; Matt Dillon – Crash as Sergeant John Ryan	**Best Actress in a Supporting Role**: **Thandiwe Newton (Note: Credited as Thandie Newton) – Crash as Christine Thayer**; Brenda Blethyn – Pride & Prejudice as Mrs. Bennet; Catherine Keener – Capote as Nelle Harper Lee; Frances McDormand – North Country as Glory Dodge; Michelle Williams – Brokeback Mountain as Alma Beers Del Mar
**Best Original Screenplay**: **Crash – Paul Haggis and Bobby Moresco**; Cinderella Man – Cliff Hollingsworth and Akiva Goldsman; Good Night, and Good Luck – George Clooney and Grant Heslov; Hotel Rwanda – Keir Pearson and Terry George; Mrs Henderson Presents – Martin Sherman	**Best Adapted Screenplay**: **Brokeback Mountain – Larry McMurtry and Diana Ossana**; Capote – Dan Futterman; The Constant Gardener – Jeffrey Caine; A History of Violence – Josh Olson; Pride & Prejudice – Deborah Moggach
**Best Cinematography**: **Memoirs of a Geisha – Dion Beebe**; Brokeback Mountain – Rodrigo Prieto; The Constant Gardener – César Charlone; Crash – J. Michael Muro; March of the Penguins – Laurent Chalet and Jerome Maison	**Best Costume Design**: **Memoirs of a Geisha – Colleen Atwood**; Charlie and the Chocolate Factory – Gabriella Pescucci; The Chronicles of Narnia: The Lion, the Witch and the Wardrobe – Isis Mussenden; Mrs Henderson Presents – Sandy Powell; Pride & Prejudice – Jacqueline Durran
**Best Editing**: **The Constant Gardener – Claire Simpson**; Brokeback Mountain – Geraldine Peroni and Dylan Tichenor; Crash – Hughes Winborne; Good Night, and Good Luck – Stephen Mirrione; March of the Penguins – Sabine Emiliani	**Best Makeup and Hair**: **The Chronicles of Narnia: The Lion, the Witch and the Wardrobe – Howard Berger, Gregory Nicotero and Nikki Gooley**; Charlie and the Chocolate Factory – Peter Owen and Ivana Primorac; Harry Potter and the Goblet of Fire – Nick Dudman, Amanda Knight and Eithné Fennell; Memoirs of a Geisha – Noriko Watanabe, Kate Biscoe, Lyndell Quiyou and Kelvin R. Trahan; Pride & Prejudice – Fae Hammand
**Best Original Music**: **Memoirs of a Geisha – John Williams**; Brokeback Mountain – Gustavo Santaolalla; The Constant Gardener – Alberto Iglesias; Mrs Henderson Presents – George Fenton; Walk the Line – T Bone Burnett	**Best Production Design**: **Harry Potter and the Goblet of Fire – Stuart Craig**; Batman Begins – Nathan Crowley; Charlie and the Chocolate Factory – Alex McDowell; King Kong – Grant Major; Memoirs of a Geisha – John Myhre
**Best Sound**: **Walk the Line – Paul Massey, Doug Hemphill, Peter Kurland and Donald Sylvester**; Batman Begins – David Evans, Stefan Henrix and Peter Lindsay; The Constant Gardener – Joakim Sundström, Stuart Wilson, Mike Prestwood Smith and Sven Taits; Crash – Richard Van Dyke, Sandy Gendler, Adam Jenkins and Marc Fishman; King Kong – Hammond Peek, Christopher Boyes, Mike Hopkins and Ethan Van der Ryn	**Best Special Visual Effects**: **King Kong – Joe Letteri, Christian Rivers, Brian Van't Hul and Richard Taylor**; Batman Begins – Janek Sirrs, Dan Glass, Chris Corbould and Paul Franklin; Charlie and the Chocolate Factory – Nick Davis, Jon Thum, Chas Jarrett and Joss Williams; The Chronicles of Narnia: The Lion, the Witch and the Wardrobe – Dean Wright, Bill Westenhofer, Jim Berney and Scott Farrar; Harry Potter and the Goblet of Fire – Jim Mitchell, John Richardson, Tim Webber and Tim Alexander
**Outstanding British Film**: **Wallace & Gromit: The Curse of the Were-Rabbit – Claire Jennings, David Sproxton, Nick Park, Steve Box, Mark Burton and Bob Baker**; A Cock and Bull Story – Andrew Eaton, Michael Winterbottom and Frank Cottrell-Boyce; The Constant Gardener – Simon Channing Williams, Fernando Meirelles and Jeffrey Caine; Festival – Christopher Young and Annie Griffin; Pride & Prejudice – Tim Bevan, Eric Fellner, Paul Webster, Joe Wright and Deborah Moggach	**Outstanding Debut by a British Writer, Director or Producer**: **Pride & Prejudice – Joe Wright (Director)**; Everything – Richard Hawkins (Director); Festival – Annie Griffin (Writer/Director); Shooting Dogs – David Belton (Producer); Tsotsi – Peter Fudakowski (Producer)
**Best Short Animation**: **Fallen Art – Jarek Sawko, Piotr Sikora and Tomasz Bagiński**; Film Noir – Osbert Parker; Kamiya's Correspondence – Sumito Sakakibara; The Mysterious Geographic Explorations of Jasper Morello – Anthony Lucas, Julia Lucas and Mark Shirrefs; Rabbit – Run Wrake	**Best Short Film**: **Antonio's Breakfast – Howard Stogdon, Amber Templemore-Finlayson and Daniel Mulloy**; Call Register – Kit Hawkins, Adam Tudhope and Ed Roe; Heavy Metal Drummer – Amanda Boyle and Luke Morris Toby MacDonald; Heydar, an Afghan in Tehran – Homayoun Assadian and Babak Jalali; Lucky – Bex Hopkins and Avie Luthra
**Best Film Not in the English Language**: **The Beat That My Heart Skipped – Pascal Caucheteux and Jacques Audiard**; Joyeux Noël – Christophe Rossignon and Christian Carion; Kung Fu Hustle – Stephen Chow, Chui Po Chu and Jeffrey Lau; Le Grand Voyage – Humbert Balsan and Ismaël Ferroukhi; Tsotsi – Peter Fudakowski and Gavin Hood	**Rising Star Award**: **James McAvoy**; Chiwetel Ejiofor; Gael García Bernal; Michelle Williams; Rachel McAdams

== Statistics ==
Films that received multiple nominations
Nominations	Film
10	The Constant Gardener
9	Brokeback Mountain
9	Crash
6	Good Night, and Good Luck
6	Memoirs of a Geisha
6	Pride & Prejudice
5	Capote
4	Charlie and the Chocolate Factory
4	Mrs Henderson Presents
4	Walk the Line
3	Batman Begins
3	The Chronicles of Narnia: The Lion, the Witch and the Wardrobe
3	Harry Potter and the Goblet of Fire
3	King Kong
2	Festival
2	March of the Penguins
2	North Country
2	Tsotsi

Films that received multiple awards
Awards	Film
4	Brokeback Mountain
3	Memoirs of a Geisha
2	Crash
2	Walk the Line

== See also ==
- 78th Academy Awards
- 31st César Awards
- 11th Critics' Choice Awards
- 58th Directors Guild of America Awards
- 19th European Film Awards
- 63rd Golden Globe Awards
- 26th Golden Raspberry Awards
- 20th Goya Awards
- 21st Independent Spirit Awards
- 11th Lumière Awards
- 17th Producers Guild of America Awards
- 10th Satellite Awards
- 32nd Saturn Awards
- 12th Screen Actors Guild Awards
- 58th Writers Guild of America Awards
