= List of This Life episodes =

This Life is a British drama television series created by Amy Jenkins and follows the lives of a group of twentysomething law students who share a house in south London. It broadcast on BBC Two from 18 March 1996 to 7 August 1997 for two series and 32 episodes. It returned for a one-off special on 2 January 2007.

== Series overview ==
Series
Series	Episodes	Originally released	
Series	Episodes	First released	Last released
1	11	18 March 1996	3 June 1996
2	21	17 March 1997	7 August 1997
Special		2 January 2007	

== Episodes ==
=== Series 1 (1996) ===
No. overall	No. in series	Title	Directed by	Written by	Original release date
1	1	"Coming Together"	Sam Miller	Amy Jenkins	18 March 1996
Three twenty-something lawyers, Miles, Milly and her boyfriend Egg, share a house in London and are looking for two new lodgers. Anna, a former one-night stand of Miles, arrives for an interview at his firm. She and Milly are old friends and Anna moves in, to Miles's annoyance since he has already attempted unsuccessfully to reignite their relationship. At Milly's firm, both Egg and another newly-qualified student, Warren, are hired. Guest Cast:Su Elliott (Maggie), Charles Harrison (Osteopath), Susan Tordoff (Personnel Officer)
2	2	"Happy Families"	Sam Miller	Amy Jenkins	25 March 1996
Working with Warren is beginning to irritate Egg, and matters aren't helped when the others offer Warren the remaining room in the house. Miles falls for a client of Anna, Delilah – an out-of-work model, also a drug addict. Warren is panicked when his cousin Kira begins to work at the firm, due to his fear of his family discovering he is gay. Guest cast: Charlotte Bicknell (Delilah), Keith-Lee Castle (Truelove), Sacha Craise (Kelly), Nicholas Sidi (Solicitor)
3	3	"Living Dangerously"	Sam Miller	Amy Jenkins	1 April 1996
Anna is annoyed Miles has moved Delilah into the house, and Miles accuses Anna of jealousy. Egg gets friendly with a client who has cancer, and is devastated when he dies. Warren realises Delilah is bulimic and tries to help by lending her money, which she then spends on drugs. The house is later burgled, with the others pointing the finger at her. Guest Cast: Charlotte Bicknell (Delilah), Keith-Lee Castle (Truelove), Simon Kunz (McCleary), Tara Williams (Doorgirl)
4	4	"Sex, Lies and Muesli Yoghurt"	Audrey Cooke	Richard Zajdlic	8 April 1996
Delilah continues to cause upset in the house, particularly with Warren and Anna. Egg meanwhile is becoming increasingly frustrated with his job in comparison to Warren who is relishing it. Delilah moves out, to Anna's glee and Miles's annoyance. Warren informs Miles that he should take an HIV test due to having had unprotected sex with Delilah, while she was also sleeping with her drug-addicted boyfriend. Guest Cast: Charlotte Bicknell (Delilah), Keith-Lee Castle (Truelove), Sacha Craise (Kelly) Ralph Ineson (Jessop)
5	5	"Fantasy Football"	Audrey Cooke	Richard Zajdlic	15 April 1996
Increasingly frustrated with work, Egg loses his sex drive. Miles frets about the possibility that he may be HIV positive and along with Warren tracks Delilah down in order for her to take a test. Anna, worried about her lack of assignments, attempts to network at a party to little success. Delilah's results prove negative, while after some soul searching, Egg quits his job at the firm. Guest Cast: Charlotte Bicknell (Delilah), Christopher Bramwell (Mr. Webb), Keith-Lee Castle (Truelove), Clare Clifford (Sarah Newley), Michael Elwyn (Montgomery), Maria McErlane (Mrs Webb)
6	6	"Family Outing"	Audrey Cooke	Patrick Wilde	22 April 1996
Concerned for Milly and Egg, Anna and Warren organise a special dinner for them. Working on a big case, Miles reluctantly enlists his father for help to no avail. Much to Warren's initial worry, Kira discovers that he is gay, but promises not to tell their family. Later, Warren's brother Dale visits. Guest Cast: Richard Cant (Phil), Paul Cottingham (Man in Park), Michael Elwyn (Montgomery), Mark Lewis Jones (Dale)
7	7	"Brief Encounter"	Audrey Cooke	Patrick Wilde	29 April 1996
In attempt to bond, Miles's father helps him with his case. With Milly concerned about Egg's lack of ambition, he announces that he's going to write a novel. Warren meets up with Dale for a drink, but declines to tell him that he's gay. Anna has a one-night stand with colleague Jo, which he mistakenly believes is the beginning of a relationship. Guest Cast: Michael Elwyn (Montgomery), Mark Lewis Jones (Dale), Nicholas Palliser (Rattigan)
8	8	"Cheap Thrills"	Nigel Douglas	Matthew Graham	6 May 1996
Egg starts a job in telesales, but gets fired within the same day. Anna, in attempt for work, socialises at her boss's birthday party. She manages to clear things with Jo, who had been very hostile towards her. Egg's father, Jerry arrives at the house with the news that he has split from his wife. Guest Cast: Chris Crooks (Muldoon), Paul Copley (Jerry)
9	9	"Just Sex"	Nigel Douglas	Matthew Graham	13 May 1996
Warren meets up with a motorcycle courier, Ferdy and has sex with him. Jerry tells Egg that he's written a novel which has received interest, Egg meanwhile goes to the job centre in an attempt to find work. Milly is working late again, but fails to notice that her boss is paying her much interest. Warren, having immediately fallen in love is shocked when Ferdy tells him that he's straight and is engaged to be married. Warren finally tells Dale that he's gay. Guest Cast: Paul Copley (Jerry), Mark Lewis Jones (Dale), Charlotte Longfield (Woman at Job Centre), Ramon Tikaram (Ferdy)
10	10	"Father Figure"	Nigel Douglas	Amy Jenkins	20 May 1996
As Milly and O'Donnell are coming back from a meeting, a man on rollerblades knocks Milly over. O'Donnell punches him and Milly subsequently begins to form a crush. Egg becomes frustrated by his lack of work and gets annoyed with his father who is still staying in the house. Miles defends a client who has been charged with indecent exposure. Anna believes the man to be innocent until he confronts her in the toilet and exposes himself. Later, after talking Anna and Jerry end up in bed together. Milly goes out to dinner with O'Donnell, but resists the temptation of taking it further. Guest Cast: Paul Copley (Jerry), Stuart Organ (Monk), Saul Reichlin (Pemberton)
11	11	"Let's Get It On"	Nigel Douglas	Amy Jenkins	3 June 1996
Milly is confused by her feelings about O'Donnell as Egg becomes suspicious. Together they see a counsellor. Anna continues her relationship with Jerry and they go out on a drug-fuelled night together. The following day Anna is shocked to discover that her client is the drug dealer from the night before. Warren talks to Dale, but Dale refuses to accept that Warren is gay. Jerry throws a party at the house to celebrate that his book is to be published. Milly and Egg make up, while Anna begins to reconsider her feelings for Miles. Guest Cast: Paul Copley (Jerry), Mark Lewis Jones (Dale), Roger McClennahan (Roy)

=== Series 2 (1997) ===
No. overall	No. in series	Title	Directed by	Written by	Original release date
12	1	"Last Tango in Southwark"	Sallie Aprahamian	Richard Zajdlic	17 March 1997
Miles and Anna have spent the night together after the party. Warren nurses a hangover, as a new trainee, Rachel, arrives at the office. Jerry decides to move out and Egg wishes him the best of luck. Miles and Anna agree to meet for a drink to discuss their relationship, but Anna is furious when she finds him talking to another woman. Guest Cast: Paul Copley (Jerry), Martin Freeman (Stuart), Mike Hayward (Leonard Ryder), Georgia Reece (Mrs. Reid)
13	2	"Guess Who's Coming to Dinner?"	Sallie Aprahamian	Richard Zajdlic	24 March 1997
Anna is co-defending with Miles in a court case. Anna gets her client to change his plea without telling Miles, and Miles’s client carries the can, much to his annoyance. Kira is angry that Kelly has returned to work and taken her job back as receptionist. Warren is surprised when Ferdy calls to the house. He tells him that the wedding never took place due to his fiancée finding out that he was bisexual. Warren allows him to stay at the house for a while. Guest Cast: Michael Begley (Terry Cole), Martin Hancock (Philip Becks), Julia Worsley (Tania Johnson)
14	3	"The Bi Who Came in From the Cold"	Sallie Aprahamian	Matthew Graham	31 March 1997
The housemates come to an agreement that Egg can cook for them by paying him for groceries each week. Egg loses the money at the bookmakers and claims that he was mugged. Ferdy is still upset at having split from his fiancée, although Warren is adamant that he is gay. Anna, now up for tenancy at her chambers, has not impressed the other barristers with her underhand tactics against Miles. Egg applies for a job as a chef. Guest Cast: James Bowers (Mick), Richard Dixon (Angus)
15	4	"How to Get in Bed by Advertising"	Dominic Lees	Matthew Graham	7 April 1997
Miles has placed a lonely hearts advert in a magazine and sets himself up on some dates – with limited success. Egg is enjoying his new job at the café working with a girl called Nicki. Warren is frustrated with Ferdy staying at the house as Ferdy is showing no interest in him. To relieve his anguish he goes to the local park to pick up a man, but is arrested by the police. Guest Cast: Steph Bramwell (Mrs. Cochrane), Andrew Charleson (Dougie), Liz Izen (Cora), Janine Wood (Judy)
16	5	"Small Town Boyo"	Dominic Lees	Mark Davies Markham	14 April 1997
Warren tells O'Donnell what has happened, but as a reporter shows up at the office, O'Donnell becomes uneasy about the bad publicity. Anna assists Miles on a case and helps him to win. With Warren's story in the newspaper O'Donnell asks him to consider handing in his resignation. When Warren refuses, O'Donnell is forced to sack him. Guest Cast: Benedict Sandiford (Brian), Danielle Tarento (Mia), Paul Medford (Paul)
17	6	"Unusual Suspect"	Dominic Lees	Mark Davies Markham	21 April 1997
Warren attends a line-up and is being defended by Milly. Kira has asked Jo out, but she has a plan to play hard to get. Egg is paranoid that Nicki fancies him and feels awkward when they go out for a drink together until she tells him that he's not her type. O'Donnell tells Milly that she must drop Warren's case. Milly passes it onto Anna, who gets him off with a small fine. Guest Cast: Mark Lewis Jones (Dale), Rod Arthur (Hughie Slater), Steph Bramwell (Mrs. Cochrane), Colin MacLachlan (I.D. Inspector), Michael Moreland (Police Officer), Christopher Staines (Dex)
18	7	"He's Leaving Home"	Joy Perino	Joe Ahearne	28 April 1997
Warren has decided to leave and travel the world – beginning with Australia. Egg discovers that Nicki has a five-year-old son. The others begin to discuss whom to rent Warren's room out to. Milly is angered when Rachel is suggested, due to her increasing dislike of her co-worker. Dale calls to see Warren, but they are unable to reconcile their differences. Later, a farewell party is thrown for Warren before he sets off on his travels the following morning. Guest Cast: Steph Bramwell (Mrs. Cochrane), Mark Lewis Jones (Dale), Paul Medford (Paul)
19	8	"Room With a Queue"	Joy Perino	Ian Iqbal Rashid	8 May 1997
An advert is placed in the local newspaper for a new housemate. A number of people are interviewed but none of them are deemed suitable. Miles calls Rachel to tell her to move in, but when Milly finds out she is annoyed and tells Ferdy he can have the room. Kira and Jo go out on a date, and Kira's hard to get act is making Jo eager for more. Guest Cast: Nitin Chandra Ganatra (Salim), Jackie Stirling (Muriel)
20	9	"Men Behaving Sadly"	Joy Perino	Ian Iqbal Rashid	15 May 1997
Now that Rachel has been told that she hasn't got the room, she tries to avoid Miles' advances. Egg begins to become more involved with his work, working longer hours. He has introduced Milly to Nicki and has met her son. Ferdy meets up with his ex-fiancée and asks if he can call round to collect his belongings. He is shocked when he discovers that she is now living with an ex-co-worker of his. Ferdy leaves the flat in rage and smashes up the man's car. Guest Cast: Clare Clifford (Sarah Newley), Danny Midwinter (Seb), Greg Prentice (George), Danielle Tarento (Mia), Richard Zajdlic (Man)
21	10	"When the Dope Comes In"	Harry Bradbeer	Amelia Bullmore	22 May 1997
O'Donnell asks Milly to go to Paris with him for a conference. Milly agonises over her decision, but ultimately declines. Ferdy gets some hashish and while he's out of the house, the police call to question him about the vandalised car. Miles and Egg, who is stoned, are left to deal with them. On returning, Ferdy lies and gives Miles and Egg as alibis, much to Miles' fury. Guest Cast: Alan Stocks (Police Officer)
22	11	"She's Gotta Get It"	Harry Bradbeer	Amelia Bullmore	29 May 1997
Miles is suspicious about lesbian solicitor Sarah Newley who is sending a lot of work Anna's way. Jo and Kira finally cement their relationship by having sex. Ferdy goes out clubbing with the effeminate Paul, but decides it is not his scene. Egg meets up with his father, who tells him that he's getting back with his mother. The vote for Anna's tenancy takes place and after an anguished wait, she's told that she has it. The housemates celebrate, unaware that Miles voted against her. Guest Cast: Paul Copley (Jerry), Michael Elwyn (Montgomery), Clare Clifford (Sarah), Paul Medford (Paul), Helene Kvale (Caroline)
23	12	"The Plumber Always Rings Twice"	Harry Bradbeer	Eirene Houston	5 June 1997
With O'Donnell and Rachel back from Paris, Milly is finding herself jealous. A handyman, Lenny calls round to fix the broken boiler in the house. Ferdy falls for him and they end up in bed together. Miles' father calls round regarding his impending wedding, but Miles refuses to go until Anna talks him round. Guest Cast: Tony Curran (Lenny), Steph Bramwell (Mrs. Cochrane), Michael Elwin (Montgomery), Gregg Prentice (George)
24	13	"Wish You Were Queer"	Sallie Aprahamian	Annie Caulfield	12 June 1997
Miles has met a woman and embarked on a relationship. Anna discovers that Miles voted against her in the tenancy and is angry with him. Sarah Newley congratulates Anna on her tenancy and admits she has fallen in love with her. Anna kisses her, but can't bring herself to go any further. Egg throws a themed Mexican night in the café. Guest Cast: Clare Clifford (Sarah)
25	14	"Who's That Girl?"	Sallie Aprahamian	Annie Caulfield	19 June 1997
Miles introduces the others to his girlfriend, Francesca. Kira and Jo have sex, but Jo is panicked after his condom comes off. Milly's dislike of Rachel is intensifying and she has a row with her in the office. The housemates find out about Ferdy and Lenny's relationship. Meanwhile, Miles announces his engagement. Guest Cast: Tony Curran (Lenny), Rachel Fielding (Francesca)
26	15	"From Here to Maternity"	Sallie Aprahamian	Jimmy Gardner	26 June 1997
Jo continues to fret that Kira may be pregnant. Anna is given an important case, working alongside an experienced colleague. The owner of the café tells Egg and Nicki that she's putting it up for sale. Egg looks into buying the lease and persuades Miles' father to be his guarantor. Milly finally gives into her feelings and sleeps with O'Donnell. Anna receives news that her mother has died, but she shows little grief. Guest Cast: Tony Curran (Lenny)
27	16	"One Bedding and a Funeral"	Joe Ahearne	Jimmy Gardner	3 July 1997
Egg's teenage brother Nat arrives for a holiday. Anna is ready to go to her mother's funeral, but decides not to bother. Kira gets her period, much to Jo's relief that she's not pregnant, but she breaks off the relationship. Her colleague Kelly subsequently tries to chat him up, but after she is turned down, she sleeps with Nat. Guest Cast: Damian Zuk (Nat)
28	17	"The Secret of My Excess"	Joe Ahearne	William Gaminara	10 July 1997
After a drunken night, Anna wakes up late for work and an important meeting with Graham. She attempts to get herself together by taking cocaine, but is later found out by Graham. With her career in jeopardy she is taken off the case. She later confides in Miles and admits she misses her mother. They end up sleeping together, despite Francesca being in Miles' bed upstairs. Miles goes in to Chambers and makes a plea for Anna's behaviour saying that she is still grieving. Egg is excited about the opening of the café, while Milly obsesses about her relationship with O'Donnell. Guest Cast: Rachel Fielding (Francesca), Lauretta Gavin (Girl)
29	18	"Diet Hard"	Joe Ahearne	William Gaminara	17 July 1997
The café opens to little success, leaving Egg deflated. Milly starts to see a counsellor about her troubles. As a condition to keeping her job, Anna is instructed to attend Alcoholics Anonymous, but she finds it of little help. Ferdy is unsettled by Lenny's plan of introducing him to his family and ends up sleeping with a woman. The next morning Miles informs her of his sexual orientation and Ferdy thumps him. Guest Cast: Tony Curran (Lenny), Daisy Beaumont (Gina), Kathleen McGoldrick (Lizzie)
30	19	"Milly Liar"	Morag Fullarton	Joe Aherne	24 July 1997
Miles and Graham win the case on the back of the work Anna had done. She declines to celebrate with them. Ferdy and Lenny make up as do Ferdy and Miles. Milly's relationship with O'Donnell continues, but becomes ever more complicated. Anna finds out and during an argument, tells Milly that she doesn't approve because of Egg. Guest Cast: Tony Curran (Lenny), Rachel Fielding (Francesca)
31	20	"Secrets and Wives"	Morag Fullarton	Richard Zajdlic	31 July 1997
Milly is surprised when O'Donnell's wife shows up at the office, but O'Donnell reassures her that they have separated. Anna continues to give Milly the cold shoulder. Miles' stag party comes around and he celebrates with the housemates, including Anna. Later, he tells Anna that he loves her and is willing to call off the wedding if she wants. Spying on O'Donnell, Milly sees that his marital relationship is far from over. Guest Cast: Tony Curran (Lenny), Rachel Fielding (Francesca)
32	21	"Apocalypse Wow!"	Morag Fullarton	Richard Zajdlic	7 August 1997
Milly is furious that O'Donnell has lied to her and ends their relationship. She makes up with Anna, who confides in her about Miles. Jo invites Kira to the wedding and she accepts. The wedding day arrives and as Anna refuses to reveal to Miles that she does indeed love him, it goes ahead. Egg asks Milly to marry him and she happily accepts. At the reception Rachel enquires to Milly about the now-spare room. Milly tells her that she has never liked her and that she will not be moving in. Rachel subsequently tells Egg about Milly and O'Donnell's affair. Egg is devastated and in fury breaks up with Milly. Ferdy has invited Lenny to the wedding and he tells him that he loves him. Milly realises that Rachel has spilled the beans and walks up to her and whacks her across the face in front of everyone. Warren arrives unseen during the ensuing fracas, declaring the scene "outstanding". Guest Cast: Tony Curran (Lenny), Michael Elwyn (Montgomery), Rachel Fielding (Francesca)

=== Special (2007) ===
No. overall	Title	Directed by	Written by	Original release date	UK viewers (millions)
33	"+ 10"	Joe Ahearne	Amy Jenkins	2 January 2007	3.58
The group meet again at Ferdy's funeral. Egg, now a successful author, is being filmed by a documentary-maker who is eager to meet the people behind the inspirations for Egg's novel (a fictionalised account of life in Benjamin Street). She suggests that the group should stage a reunion, which she will film. The reunion is arranged at Miles's mansion in Sussex, where he lives with his Vietnamese second wife Me Linh. Anna, still a barrister, visits a sperm bank, but is told there is a five-year waiting list. Milly and Egg's relationship survived her affair with O'Donnell and they now have a three-year-old son called Oscar. Milly, now a full-time mother, is not entirely happy with the sacrifice of her career for motherhood, and faces hostility from Anna. Warren, boasting of his "life-affirming" therapy venture is secretly battling depression. Me Linh leaves Miles and it becomes apparent that his business has failed as the bailiffs move in. Milly tells Egg that she wants to break up with him, but her feelings change when Egg decides to abandon the documentary and quits his career as a writer. Warren agrees to have a baby with Anna, and a penniless Miles decides to go travelling. Guest Cast: Jodie Whittaker (Clare), Linh Dan Pham (Me-Linh), Deborah Findlay (Doctor), Nick Sampson (Priest), Mark Lawson (Interviewer), James Greene (Judge), Joanne McQuinn (Audience Member), Nicholas Beveney (Bailiff), Shakeel Orr-Deen (Oscar), Stephen Humby (Passer By)
