= Undercover Heart =

- Genre: Crime drama
- Created by: Peter Bowker
- Directed by: John Strickland; Richard Signy
- Starring: Steven Mackintosh; Daniela Nardini; Lennie James; Lisa Coleman; David Troughton; Tony Curran; Trevor Laird; Buffy Davis; Leonie Elliott
- Theme music composer: Nick Bicât
- Country of origin: United Kingdom
- Original language: English
- No. of series: 1
- No. of episodes: 6

Production
- Executive producer: Edwina Craze
- Producer: Jane Fallon
- Cinematography: John McGlashan
- Running time: 50 minutes

Original release
- Network: BBC One
- Release: 1 October – 5 November 1998

Undercover Heart is a six-part British television crime drama series, first broadcast on 1 October 1998, that aired on BBC One. The series centres on an undercover vice squad detective, Tom Howarth (Steven Mackintosh), who goes missing while investigating the murder of a prostitute. His wife Lois (Daniela Nardini), and his best friend Matt (Lennie James), who are also detectives, set out to search for him, but end up falling in love with one another. The series was produced by Liquid Television and created by screenwriter Peter Bowker.

The series also starred Lisa Coleman, David Troughton, Tony Curran, Trevor Laird, Buffy Davis and Leonie Elliott in supporting roles. The series was also screened in Australia in 2004. Notably, the series has never been released on DVD.

== Cast ==
- Steven Mackintosh as Tom Howarth
- Daniela Nardini as Lois Howarth
- Lennie James as Matt Lomas
- Lisa Coleman as Sarah May
- David Troughton as Jim Ryan
- Tony Curran as Jimmy Hatcher
- Trevor Laird as Wesley Carter
- Buffy Davis as Annie Gibson
- Leonie Elliott as Holly Lomas
- Daniel Kobby Erskine as Richard Davis
- Jennifer Hennessy as Saffron
- Andy Dennehy as Harry Blake
- Nimmy March as Fiona Cullen
- Mossie Smith as Jade Lennox
- Samantha Dent as Shelley Marsh
- Michael Bertenshaw as Peter Drew
- Julian Harries as Patrick Iriving
- Stephen Churchett as Supt. Knowles

== Episodes ==
No.	Title	Directed by	Written by	Original release date	Viewers (millions)
1	"Episode 1"	John Strickland	Peter Bowker	1 October 1998	6.49
When an undercover vice squad detective, Tom Howarth, goes missing while investigating the murder of a prostitute, his wife Lois and his best friend Matt, who are also detectives, set out to search for him.
2	"Episode 2"	John Strickland	Peter Bowker	8 October 1998	6.45
Matthew and Lois are caught in a struggle between loyalty and desire, made evermore intense as their search for Tom reveals his risky undercover game.
3	"Episode 3"	John Strickland	Peter Bowker	15 October 1998	7.44
As the investigation into the murder continues, the evidence suggests that Tom's life maybe in danger. Events spiral out of control, and Lois is forced to make a tough decision about Matthew.
4	"Episode 4"	Richard Signy	Peter Bowker	22 October 1998	7.33
Matt, deeply involved with Lois, wants to carry on their affair. Meanwhile Lois must face up to further revelations about Tom's undercover life as a pimp.
5	"Episode 5"	Richard Signy	Peter Bowker	29 October 1998	7.25
The truth is out and as Lois and Tom go through the agonies of post-adultery jealousy, and a devastated Matt wonders whether he can put the affair behind him.
6	"Episode 6"	Richard Signy	Peter Bowker	5 November 1998	7.74
Are Tom's worst fears about the murder going to be confirmed? And will he and Lois stay together?
