= He's Leaving Home =

He's Leaving Home may refer to:

- "He's Leaving Home" (Black Books), a 2000 television episode
- "He's Leaving Home" (This Life), a 1997 television episode

== See also ==
- "She's Leaving Home", a song by the Beatles
