= Tube Tales =

- DVD cover
- Directed by: Amy Jenkins; Stephen Hopkins; Menhaj Huda; Charles McDougall; Bob Hoskins; Ewan McGregor; Jude Law; Armando Iannucci; Gaby Dellal
- Written by: Amy Jenkins; Stephen Hopkins; Armando Iannucci; Gaby Dellal; Ed Allen; Paul Fraser; Atalanta Goulandris; Mark Greig; Nick Perry; Harsha Patel
- Cinematography: Sue Gibson; Brian Tufano; David Johnson
- Edited by: Liz Green; Niven Howie
- Distributed by: Amuse Video Inc.
- Release date: 16 November 1999 (UK)
- Running time: 84 minutes
- Country: United Kingdom
- Language: English

Tube Tales is a 1999 British anthology film of nine short films based on the true-life experiences of London Underground (aka The Tube) passengers as submitted to Time Out magazine. The stories were scripted and filmed independently of each other. Filming took place on the London Underground network in 1999 by nine directors including Stephen Hopkins, Charles McDougall and Bob Hoskins, with directorial debuts by Ewan McGregor and Jude Law. The film was produced by Richard Jobson and is also Simon Pegg's film debut, in a small role.

== The films ==
In order of screening:

=== Mr Cool ===
Director: Amy Jenkins
Writer: Amy Jenkins
Originator: Sue Smallwood
Starring: Jason Flemyng, Dexter Fletcher and Kelly Macdonald
Synopsis: After failing to impress his dream girl, Mr Cool suffers the embarrassment of becoming trapped on a train to nowhere.
Cast: (in alphabetical order) Jason Flemyng (Luke); Dexter Fletcher (Joe); Kelly Macdonald (Emma).

=== Horny ===
Director: Stephen Hopkins
Writer: Stephen Hopkins
Originator: Alex Piro
Starring: Denise van Outen and Tom Bell
Synopsis: A young woman flirts with a businessman somewhere under Liverpool Street.
Cast: (in alphabetical order) Denise van Outen (Alex); Liz Smith (Old Lady); Tom Bell (Old Gent); Leah Fitzgerald (Little Girl).

=== Grasshopper ===
Director: Menhaj Huda
Writer: Harsha Patel
Originator: Gary Dellaway
Starring: Dele Johnson, Ray Panthaki and Stephen Da Costa
Synopsis: Two ticket inspectors close in on a suspected fare dodger, only to discover their target is not quite what he seemed, in a bizarre case of mistaken identity.
Cast: (in alphabetical order) Stephen Da Costa (Mr X); Alicya Eyo (Shantel); Roger Griffiths (Charlie); Dele Johnson (Stevie); Preeya Kalidas (Reena); Peter McNamara (Roy); Mazhar Munir (Mazaar); Raiyo Panthaki (Mo); Ashish Raja (Bulla); Marcia Rose (Miss Clinique); Jake Wood (James).

=== My Father the Liar ===
Director: Bob Hoskins
Writer: Paul Fraser
Originator: Christine Barry
Starring: Ray Winstone and Tom Watson
Synopsis: A young boy and his father witness an incident that causes the father to lie to his son.
Cast: (in alphabetical order) Edna Doré (Bag Lady); Frank Harper (Ticket Examiner); William Hoyland (Suicide Victim); Richard Jobson (Vendor); Tom Watson (The Son); Ray Winstone (The Father).

=== Bone ===
Director: Ewan McGregor
Writer: Mark Greig
Originator: Sam Taggart
Starring: Nicholas Tennant and Kay Curram
Synopsis: A musician invents a fantasy world surrounding the owner of a lost travel card displayed in the window of the ticket office.
Cast: (in alphabetical order) Corrinne Charton (Pot Plant Lady); Kay Curram (Louise); Joe Duttine (Flamboyant Soloist); Douglas L. Mellor (Concert Hall Manager); Nicholas Tennant (Gordon).

=== Mouth ===
Director: Armando Iannucci
Writer: Armando Iannucci
Originator: Peter Hart
Starring: Daniela Nardini
Synopsis: A crowded compartment's attentions are drawn to an attractive well-groomed woman, but she doesn't quite live up to their individual expectations.
Cast: (in alphabetical order) Buster Bevis (Father); Helen Coker (Bride To Be); Mark Frost (Dude); Sky Glover (Girlfriend); Simon Greenall (Business Man); Dominic Holland (Cello Player); Daniela Nardini (Heroine); Matthew Xia (Boyfriend).

=== A Bird in the Hand ===
Director: Jude Law
Writer: Ed Allen
Originator: Jim Sillavan
Starring: Alan Miller
Synopsis: When a trapped bird stuns itself on a window, a couple of passengers debate the bird's fate before an elderly man liberates it above ground.
Cast: (in alphabetical order) Ed Allen (Youth 2); Frank Harper (Ticket Examiner); Morgan Jones (Youth 1); Alan Miller (Old Man); Cleo Sylvestre (Woman).

=== Rosebud ===
Director: Gaby Dellal
Writers: Gaby Dellal and Atalanta Goulandris
Originator: Tracey Finch
Starring: Rachel Weisz
Synopsis: A mother is separated from her daughter and experiences agonising panic as she searches for her, whilst the child discovers a surreal wonderland.
Cast: (in alphabetical order) Joao Costa Menezes (?); Doña Croll (Elizabeth); Leonie Elliott (Rosebud); Danny Cerqueira (Station Guard); Frank Harper (Ticket Examiner); Ian Puleston-Davies (Typewriter Man); Rachel Weisz (Angela).

=== Steal Away ===
Director: Charles McDougall
Writer: Nick Perry
Originator: TJ Austin
Starring: Hans Matheson and Carmen Ejogo
Synopsis: Two young opportunists steal a briefcase, which turns out to contain wads of money. Their victim shoots at them, but they seem to escape unscathed onto an unused platform where they board a mysterious train. A preacher reads from the bible and a young boy washes passengers' feet. Leaving the train the couple leave the money with a tramp before heading to the exit where only one of their tickets is valid.
Cast: (in alphabetical order) Tim Barlow (Elderly Drunk); Darren Carr (Black Boy); Jim Carter (Ticket Inspector); Emma Cunniffe (Drained Young Woman); Clint Dyer (Walkman Boy); Jello Edwards (Middle Aged Woman); Annette Ekblom (Boy's Mum); Carmen Ejogo (Girl); Simon Kunz (White Pinstripe Suit Man); Hans Matheson (Michael); Simon Pegg (Clerk); Sean Pertwee (Driver); Lee Ross (Male Reveller); Don Warrington (Preacher).
