= Peter Jenkins (journalist) =

British newspaper columnist and editor

- Born: Peter George James Jenkins; 11 May 1934
- Died: 27 May 1992 (aged 58) London, England
- Occupation: Journalist, editor
- Education: Trinity Hall, Cambridge
- Period: 1958–1992
- Subjects: British politics
- Spouse: Charlotte Strachey (died) Polly Toynbee (m. 1970)
- Children: Amy

Peter George James Jenkins (11 May 1934 – 27 May 1992) was a British journalist and Associate Editor of The Independent. During his career he wrote regular columns for The Guardian, The Sunday Times as well as The Independent.

== Early life and education ==
Peter Jenkins was born at 5, Penn Road, Beaconsfield, Buckinghamshire, son of pharmaceutical chemist Kenneth Edmund Jenkins (1906-1993) and teacher Joan Evelyn (1907-1981), née Croger, and grew up at Bury St Edmunds, Suffolk, where his father had a successful chemist's shop. He was educated at Culford School and Trinity Hall, Cambridge, where he took a BA in history. He later attended the University of Wisconsin–Madison on a Harkness Fellowship, where he was a socialist activist. He performed his National Service in the Royal Navy in the Mediterranean fleet.

== Journalistic career ==
He began his career as a journalist with the Financial Times (1958–60) and progressed to The Guardian where he was variously their Labour Correspondent (1963–67), Washington Correspondent (1972–74), and Political Commentator and Policy Editor (1974–85). He was a political columnist for The Sunday Times from 1985 to 1987 and Associate Editor of The Independent from 1987 until his death.

During his tenure at The Guardian Jenkins became, according to The Times, the "leading chronicler of the Labour governments of the 1960s and 1970s, notably of their internecine warfare". He was committed to a vision of a European Britain, anti-communist but more socially inclusive than the American model of society. He belonged to a group of "Königswinter journalists", who during meetings with politicians and civil servants in Königswinter near Bonn, the West German capital, attempted to build a pan-European group of opinion-formers, leaving behind the enmities of the past and looking forward to European community.

Jenkins was also theatre critic for The Spectator from 1978 to 1981 and his first stage play, Illuminations, was performed at the Lyric Theatre, Hammersmith, in 1980. He also wrote the comedy series Struggle, broadcast on Channel 4 (1983–84), a satire on the Conservative–Labour battles in local government at the time.

Peter Jenkins was a visiting Fellow of Nuffield College, Oxford. His awards included 'Granada TV Journalist of the Year' for 1978.

== Personal life ==
Jenkins was married twice: his first wife, Charlotte Strachey, died from leukemia. He later married Polly Toynbee in 1970, and they remained married until his death. Amy Jenkins, author of the 1990s TV serial This Life, is his daughter.

== Later life ==
Jenkins, a longtime smoker who stopped in the final years of his life, died from respiratory failure, caused by idiopathic pulmonary fibrosis, at University College Hospital in London on 27 May 1992, aged 58. Numerous political figures paid tribute, including Neil Kinnock. John Major called Jenkins a "gregarious man of lively wit and great charm, and an undisputed master of his profession", and David Owen said he was "an exceptional journalist with a deep understanding of the Labour movement".

John Birt, then director-general of the BBC, wrote in The Times:

He was a superb political journalist who understood what motivated the personalities and the players on the political stage; who had a profound and detailed understanding of all the key policy issues at home and abroad; and who had a sharp grasp of how these played into the political process. He cared about the issues; and he routinely produced a rounded, beautifully literate and astute commentary on our political times. He was its chief chronicler; and he will be greatly missed.

== Works ==
- Jenkins, Peter (1970). The Battle of Downing Street. London: Knight. ISBN 978-0-85314-068-9.
- Jenkins, Peter (1977). Where Trotskysm got lost: the restoration of European democracy after the Second World War. Nottingham: Spokesman Pamphlet 59.
- Jenkins, Peter (1987). Mrs Thatcher's revolution: the ending of the socialist era. London: Cape. ISBN 978-0-674-58832-5.

Moreover, some of his work has been collected in an edited book:

- Brivati, Brian, and Richard Cockett, eds. Introduction by Polly Toynbee (1995). Anatomy of decline : the political journalism of Peter Jenkins. London: Cassell. ISBN 0-304-34476-1.

== Bibliography ==
- Marr, Andrew. My trade. A short history of British journalism. London: Pan Macmillan, 2005. (p. 354 ff.)
