= This Life (1996 TV series) =

British television series

- Series logo
- Created by: Amy Jenkins
- Starring: Amita Dhiri; Jack Davenport; Jason Hughes; Andrew Lincoln; Daniela Nardini; Ramon Tikaram; Luisa Bradshaw-White; Steve John Shepherd; Natasha Little; David Mallinson; Juliet Cowan; Sacha Craise; Cyril Nri
- Country of origin: United Kingdom
- Original language: English
- No. of series: 2
- No. of episodes: 33 (list of episodes)

Production
- Running time: 50 minutes
- Production company: World Productions

Original release
- Network: BBC Two
- Release: 18 March 1996 – 2 January 2007

This Life is a BBC television drama that was produced by World Productions and screened on BBC Two. Two series were broadcast from 18 March 1996 to 7 August 1997, with a later reunion special on 2 January 2007. It centres on a group of law graduates in their twenties, embarking upon their careers while sharing a house in south London. There are no courtroom scenes in either the first or second series, and only one brief scene in the TV sequel.

The show became a popular word-of-mouth hit and was included on BFI's list of the 100 greatest British television programmes.

== Production ==
The series was created by Amy Jenkins, who was also its principal writer. Other writers contributed scripts, including Joe Ahearne (who also directed some episodes—the only person to do both on the series), Ian Iqbal Rashid, Amelia Bullmore, and Matthew Graham. Tony Garnett was the executive producer and Jane Fallon worked as a producer on both series.

== Broadcast ==
The first series premiered in 1996. It was neither a critical nor a ratings success. It was only its repeat run of the first series, beginning 2 January 1997, then every Wednesday evening from 3 January in a post-Newsnight slot, that the show really began to attract serious, but still relatively moderate, viewer attention. This rerun ran smoothly into the start of the new second series, from Monday 17 March 1997, restored to its peak-time slot, by which time it was attracting praise as a cult hit. By the time the second series ended, the show was attracting strong audience figures for a BBC Two show of around four million, and became a national talking point, regularly making headlines in both tabloid and broadsheet newspapers.

Both of the series were then repeated late-night from 12 June to 2 August 2000.

Another screening of the first series only was shown on Sunday evenings between 30 March and 13 July 2003. As a run-in to the reunion, the BBC repeated every episode, two each night Monday to Thursday, starting 6 November 2006, on BBC Two.

In March 2013, the entire series including This Life +10 and That Life (a short documentary about the reunion special) was made available via Virgin On Demand.

From 3 February 2020, series one of This Life was repeated on BBC4, carrying a dedication to its executive producer, Tony Garnett, who had died aged 83 during the previous month.

To celebrate the show’s 30th anniversary on 18 March 2026, it was repeated on BBC Four.

== Episodes ==
Series
Series	Episodes	Originally released	
Series	Episodes	First released	Last released
1	11	18 March 1996	3 June 1996
2	21	17 March 1997	7 August 1997
Special		2 January 2007	

=== Series one (1996) ===
This Life is based around life in a London law firm and barristers' chambers of trainee solicitors and pupil barristers, but is essentially a character-driven drama.

Egg and Milly have been dating since they were at university, but their career choices create tension between them. Conscientious Milly is ambitious, spending a lot of time working with her older boss Mr O'Donnell. Egg suffers a crisis of dissatisfaction with a career in law, and soon resigns from the firm.

Anna and Miles had a brief fling at university, and Anna is fixated on the indifferent Miles. Their love–hate relationship makes their work and home life frequently tense.

The other housemate Warren is a gay man. He spends some time dealing with issues around his sexuality, especially in relation to coming out to friends and family. In an unusual plot device, he is frequently seen discussing his feelings with a therapist who is heard and only rarely seen by the viewer.

Miles appears sometimes to dislike Warren, and subjects him to occasional homophobic abuse when angered. Miles's manipulative girlfriend, the drug-addicted and bulimic Delilah, moves in with him. This results in conflict in the house. When Miles, who has not been practising safe sex with Delilah, discovers that she is still sleeping with her heroin addict ex, Truelove, he has an HIV scare. Milly clashes with Egg over his perceived lack of ambition, and becomes attracted to O'Donnell.

=== Series two (1997) ===
During the second series, storylines were expanded to include other connected characters. These included Ferdy (Ramon Tikaram), briefly Warren's boyfriend; Rachel (Natasha Little) a new junior trainee at Milly's law firm; and Francesca, Miles's girlfriend and later fiancée. Previously secondary characters Jo (Steve John Shepherd) and Warren's cousin, Kira (Luisa Bradshaw-White) feature more heavily as they embarked upon a relationship. Moore Spencer Wright receptionist Kelly (Sacha Craise) also became much more prominent. Ferdy was a bisexual character, seen as a replacement for Warren when Jason Hughes decided to leave the show (he did return for the final scene). Finding a relationship with Anna impossible, Miles began a relationship with Francesca, a woman nearly a decade older than he was. Miles proposed to Francesca, but still harboured feelings for Anna.

Rachel had a long-running passive-aggressive feud with Milly, although on the surface the pair were able to work together without mention of their mutual dislike. Milly's dislike of Rachel was very strong, viewing her as a threat to her relationship with O'Donnell, and disliking her apparently perfect demeanour. Milly confided in Anna that she found Rachel almost suffocatingly "nice". The tension between the two went unresolved throughout the second series, culminating in the final scene, in the episode "Apocalypse Wow!" At Miles and Francesca's wedding reception, after Milly learns that Rachel has told Egg of her affair with O'Donnell, Milly punches Rachel in the face.

=== This Life + 10 (2006) ===
In 2006, the BBC reconvened the original cast for a special one-off 80-minute special, looking at what had happened to the lead characters in the intervening ten years. The episode begins with the original five housemates reuniting for Ferdy's funeral. Milly and Egg are together, though not married, and have had a young son, but Miles is divorced from Francesca and has a new Vietnamese wife, Me Linh. The circumstances of both Ferdy's death and Miles's divorce are not revealed.

This new episode was entitled + 10 onscreen, and kept the original title sequence and programme title This Life. It was screened on 2 January 2007, and was a co-production between BBC Wales and the original producers World Productions. This Life + 10 was written by Jenkins, directed by Ahearne and produced by Garnett. It gained 3.5 million viewers, with a 14% audience share.

== Cast ==
- Jack Davenport as Miles Stewart
- Amita Dhiri as Djamila "Milly" Nassim
- Andrew Lincoln as Edgar "Egg" Cooke
- Daniela Nardini as Anna Forbes
- Jason Hughes as Warren Jones
- Ramon Tikaram as Ferdinand "Ferdy" Garcia
- David Mallinson as Michael O'Donnell
- Luisa Bradshaw-White as Kira
- Steve John Shepherd as Jo
- Natasha Little as Rachel
- Juliet Cowan as Nicki
- Sacha Craise as Kelly
- Cyril Nri as Graham
- Geoffrey Bateman as Hooperman
- Gillian McCutcheon as Therapist
- Tony Curran as Lenny
- Paul Copley as Jerry Cooke
- Mark Lewis Jones as Dale Jones
- Rachel Fielding as Francesca
- Michael Elwyn as Montgomery
- Clare Clifford as Sarah Newly
- Charlotte Bicknell as Delilah
- Keith-Lee Castle as Truelove
- Paul J. Medford as Paul

=== Guest cast ===
- The Office and Sherlock star Martin Freeman appears in the first episode of the second series, pictured stealing money from Milly and Egg's bedroom after a party, and accidentally drinking Egg's urine from a can, believing it to be beer.
- Ralph Ineson, also from The Office, featured in an early episode as a client of Milly, as the character Jessop.
- EastEnders actor Nitin Ganatra appeared in an episode of the second series playing a prospective housemate who manages to upset Milly.
- Another later well-known actor appearing early in the second series is Martin Hancock, who went on to star in Coronation Street as Spider, followed by Holby City as Reg Lund.
- Clare Clifford played lesbian lawyer Sarah Newly who propositions Anna in episode five of the first series.
- Stuart Organ, best known as Mr Robson in Grange Hill, appeared as a flasher in the first series.
- Jodie Whittaker, later the Thirteenth Doctor in Doctor Who, plays Clare in This Life +10.

== Characters ==
This Life initially featured a core cast of five main characters sharing a rented house in Southwark, with a supporting cast drawn from their professional and private lives.

=== Main cast ===
Egg (series 1–2 & +10 special)

Born Edgar Cooke in Manchester, Egg is an English graduate with a conversion in law, and is in a full-time relationship with girlfriend Milly. At the beginning of the series he interviews for, and is successful in gaining, a junior position with solicitors firm Moore Spencer Wright. Egg met Milly at university and they have been in a solid relationship since then. In the first series, Egg struggles to fit in at his legal firm, feeling demotivated by the tedium of the job. Early in the series, he is assigned one of his boss's clients as a case, but the client, who has cancer, dies by unexpectedly taking his own life and Egg realises law is not for him, quitting the firm midway through series 1. After brief stints attempting to write a novel and working at telesales, from which he is fired for going off-script after only one day on the job, Egg finds his passion early in series 2 when he gets a job in a café working alongside single mum Nicki. Enjoying the work, despite the low pay, Egg decides to purchase the café after its owner Mrs Cochrane moves to Ireland and puts it up for sale.

Egg also has challenges with his family – his father, Jerry, visits from Manchester and reveals that his mother has been having an affair with a family friend, although they are later reconciled in the second series. It is revealed also that Egg is a keen football fan and supports Manchester United.

Egg's relationship with Milly is initially strained in the first series – she is unhappy with his lack of motivation and being the sole breadwinner after he quits his job, although they rekindle their passion after a therapy session and have sex for the first time in months in the final episode of series 1. Throughout the second series, Egg spends less time with Milly owing to their increased time at their respective jobs. Milly begins an affair with O'Donnell, which is revealed via Rachel at the climax of the second series at Miles' wedding; a devastated Egg splits from Milly.

Ten years later, Egg is a successful author, and he and Milly have reconciled and have a young son called Oscar. Milly and Egg again are close to separation, but a series of events make them realise they deeply care for each other and they remain together.

Milly (series 1–2 & +10 special)

Jamilla Nassim was born in Barnet to an Indian emigrant family and, while studying for a law degree, met Egg and they began a relationship. Milly is, at the beginning of the series, a solicitor who has just completed her final training and is a junior partner at Moore Spencer Wright. Milly is hardworking and, despite her relative youth, is keen to secure the best outcomes for her clients. When Egg quits the firm midway through the first series, Milly finds it hard to deal with his apathetic attitude and harbours romantic thoughts towards her boss Michael O'Donnell. At the climax of the first series, Egg and Milly visit a therapist and initially resolve their differences.

In the first episode of the second series, Milly meets a new trainee at her firm, Rachel. Initially put out that she was not informed the firm was getting a trainee, Milly and Rachel form an uneasy working relationship, although Milly finds Rachel's extremely positive demeanour irritating and is jealous of the relationship she has with her boss. After a brief romantic encounter at the end of the first series, Milly embarks on a full-blown affair with O'Donnell in the latter half of the second series, but the relationship ends when she discovers he has lied about separating from his wife.

Throughout the second series, the underlying tensions between Milly and Rachel increase and, after Warren leaves early in the second series, Rachel wants to move into the shared house that Milly and the others live in, which Milly is deeply opposed to. After Miles marries Francesca, Rachel enquires again about the possibility of moving into the shared house, at which point Milly reveals her complete antipathy towards Rachel. Rachel gains revenge by telling Egg about the affair between Milly and O'Donnell, at which point Milly marches across the dancefloor and punches Rachel in the face.

Ten years later, Milly and Egg are married with a young son called Oscar. Milly is resentful at having given up a promising career in law to raise Oscar, while Egg has become a successful writer. Although initially planning to separate from Egg, she later reverses her decision and they remain together at the close of the series.

Anna (series 1–2 & +10 special)

Anna Forbes was born in Glasgow. It is revealed in the first episode that her childhood was difficult, with an alcoholic mother who neglected her frequently. Despite her difficult upbringing, Anna is a tenacious, charismatic and talented barrister, albeit one who frequently takes risks on behalf of her clients.

In the first series, Anna interviews for a position at chambers but is unsuccessful. Nonetheless, chambers clerk Jo suggests that she "squat" and undertake supplementary work and unwanted cases in order to earn an income. Anna moves into the shared house and is reunited with her former boyfriend Miles, whom she dated at university. The on/off relationship between Miles and Anna is one of the main storylines that runs throughout the entire series. Anna and Miles initially reunite as friends, although Anna is uncomfortable early in the first series when Miles is dating drug addict and thief Delilah, and helps to sabotage the relationship. Near the end of the first series, Anna sleeps with Egg's father, Jerry, although at a house party to celebrate his book being accepted by a publisher, she hides from him and ends up sleeping with Miles. At the beginning of the second series, Anna sees Miles talking to another woman at a bar and, misunderstanding the situation, thinks he is cheating on her and promptly dumps him.

The head of chambers, James Hooperman, decides to hold a vote on Anna's tenancy midway through series 2. The majority of the chambers partners vote in favour of Anna gaining a tenancy, partly because Anna has been successful at getting extra work from the law firm Rankin-Jamall. The increased work is, in part, due to Anna flirting with Rankin-Jamall lesbian barrister Sarah Newley and, although the relationship never progresses any further, some of the partners at chambers remain sceptical about Anna's abilities as a barrister, in particular Miles (who does not support her tenancy vote) and Graham (who abstains from voting). When Anna finds out Miles voted against her, she is furious, although she later reconciles with him when he admits he was jealous of the extra work she was receiving.

Later in the second series, Anna manages to be assigned the Aylmore case, involving a teacher who has allegedly had an affair with one his pupils. Working with Graham as his junior brief, Anna correctly deduces, after reviewing witness testimonies and social services reports, that the girl fabricated her story and is lying. Unfortunately, Anna's work on the case occurs at the same time her mother dies from her alcoholism and, after initially refusing to attend the funeral, later relies on alcohol and drugs to sustain her work. After Graham catches her snorting cocaine in chambers toilets, she is nearly fired but Hooperman offers her a conditional return, subject to her attending AA meetings. Miles takes over the Aylmore case and helps Graham win it, but Anna is resentful of this given the hard work she put in. Anna finds out about Milly's affair with O'Donnell and is angry that her friend did not listen to her advice, although they later reconcile.

Ten years later, Anna is a very successful barrister but is unmarried and has no children. Desperately wanting a child, she visits a sperm bank and is told there is an extensive waiting list. After reuniting with the others, she makes amends with Milly, and it is implied that she and Miles sleep together before he departs to travel the world.

Miles (series 1–2 & +10 special)

Miles Stuart is introduced at the start of the series as a junior barrister in chambers. Born into a wealthy and privileged family, Miles initially displays views and makes comments that are considered racist, sexist and (in particular) homophobic.

At the beginning of the first series, Miles is reunited with former flame Anna, although they keep their relationship platonic initially. Miles embarks on a relationship with drug addict and thief Delilah, whom he meets while Anna is defending her boyfriend Truelove at court. Miles remains oblivious to Delilah's true nature, even after she is accused of stealing from his housemates and continuing to take drugs with Truelove. After Delilah moves out, Miles believes they have turned against him and lashes out at Anna and Warren in particular, although he later makes up and apologises to both of them. Miles' homophobic views again come to fore in the second series after Warren leaves and Ferdy replaces him as a housemate. The pair frequently argue, more so after Miles is forced to perjure himself to prevent Ferdy being arrested for property damage.

Midway through the first series, Miles is offered the brief in the Sherringham case, a high-level trial that involves fraudulent stock exchanges. Realising, after a conversation with Graham, that he is protecting people that are privileged like himself, he looks for a way out of the case. By chance, Miles' father, Montgomery, was one of the key witnesses to Sherringham's innocence and this enables Miles to recuse himself from the case to avoid professional embarrassment. The relationship between Miles and Montgomery is contentious. Miles blames his father for being absent when he was a child and, despite his sizeable inheritance, initially wants nothing more to do with him. In the second series, Montgomery makes amends to Miles and reveals to his son that he is going to marry Caroline, a young fundraiser he met at a charity event. Miles is initially sceptical and refuses to go to the wedding, but Anna convinces him otherwise.

Miles himself becomes engaged later in series two after meeting designer and store purchaser Francesca. Despite Francesca being nearly ten years older than he is, they announce their wedding, which takes place at in the final episode of the second series. Unbeknown to Francesca, Miles had sex with Anna a few days after their engagement while he was comforting her after her mother's death. Miles continue to wind up Ferdy, but later stops after he punches him in the face and Anna reveals he had witnessed them having sex in the front room.

Ten years later, Miles has divorced Francesca and is married to a Vietnamese woman called Me Linh, and it is implied that he has left chambers to found his own businesses. The relationship between husband and wife is strained, more so when Anna returns and Miles reveals that he is in severe financial trouble owing to his businesses failing. Penniless and homeless after his mansion is repossessed by the bailiffs, Miles leaves to go travelling around the world.

Warren (series 1–2 & +10 special)

Warren Jones is a solicitor originally from Wales. During the early episodes in series 1, it is revealed that his family are working class and that he seeks a better life for himself in London. Like Egg, he interviews and is successful in gaining a position at solicitor's firm Moore Spencer Wright. Initially, Egg is antagonistic towards him, but softens and invites him to rent with them as the fifth housemate.

Warren's sexuality and others' acceptance of it are a major part of the character in the first series. However, he is worried that his family back home, who are unaware that he is gay, may reject him. In order to deal with his anxieties, he regularly visits a therapist who encourages him to embrace his sexuality and tell his friends. While Egg, Milly, Miles and Anna are initially all aware, other colleagues and family members are not. Near the beginning of the first series, both Warren's cousin Kira and his older brother Dale come to visit him at various times. Kira gets a job at Moore Spencer Wright and Warren struggles to hide the truth about his sexuality from her until one night when he is cottaging in a nearby park and she fends off a man who she mistakenly thinks is attacking Warren. While Kira is happy and accepting of his sexuality, Dale (who is on leave from the Army) is extremely uncomfortable and refuses to accept it. The relationship between the brothers is permanently damaged and, despite the best efforts of Kira, Dale refuses to make amends.

While Warren's professional life is going well, he struggles to find a suitable partner. Near the end of the first series, he meets motorbike courier Ferdy, although he later discovers that he is engaged and coming to terms with his sexuality. Ferdy and Warren meet again early in series 2 after Ferdy splits from his fiancée; they embark on a brief romance while Ferdy sleeps in the front room.

Warren's private life comes uncomfortably to the fore when he goes cottaging one night and is caught up in a sting operation with an undercover police operative who is assaulted by another man whom Warren was about to have sex with. Instead of fleeing the scene, he stays to see if the assaulted policeman is OK, and while doing so, he is arrested for gross indecency. He is bailed, pending a trial. Warren finds that his private life becomes tabloid fodder and he is fired by his boss O'Donnell after bringing the firm into disrepute. Following a police line-up, he is cleared of assault and Anna successfully defends him in court, with only a small fine to pay for breach of the peace.

With his redundancy pay, Warren decides to go travelling around the world, starting in Australia. Dale makes a final visit and tries to convince Warren not to tell his parents the truth about why he is leaving and his sexuality. Warren refuses, at which point Dale calls him selfish and walks out of Warren's life for good. The housemates bid him a fond farewell and he leaves Southwark in a taxi. Warren keeps in touch with his friends via postcards through the rest of series 2 and makes a cameo appearance at the very end of the final episode during Miles and Francesca’s wedding (in doing so, Warren becomes the character to have uttered both the first and last lines of the series, not including the +10 special).

Ten years later, Warren has his own online therapy organisation, but is battling severe depression and initially tries to keep it a secret from his former housemates. After they mistakenly believe he is trying to commit suicide, he reveals his true mental state and they collectively support him.

Ferdy (series 1 guest, series 2 main)

Ferdinando Garcia, known to his friends as Ferdy, is introduced in the penultimate episode of series 1 as a motorbike courier of Mexican descent delivering documents to Moore Spencer Wright, where he catches the eye of Warren. After visiting a bar together, they later have sex, although Ferdy admits it is a mistake and he is engaged to be married. While drunk, Warren phones Ferdy’s home, but ends up mistakenly getting his father on the other end of the line and confessing what has happened to him. Ferdy is furious and comes round and attacks Warren before telling him to stay out of his life for good.

Ferdy returns in the second series and reveals that his fiancée Mia found out that he had been seeing other men and called off the engagement while his parents disowned him and kicked him out of their home. Ferdy stays on the sofa in the shared house and rekindles his relationship with Warren, accepting that he is attracted to men as well as women and is bisexual. After Warren leaves to go travelling around the world, Ferdy is offered his room and agrees to become a paying tenant.

Continuing to struggle with his sexuality, Ferdy tries to reconcile with Mia, but discovers she is now seeing his former rival and co-worker Seb. Adding insult to injury, Mia reveals it was Seb who told her about Ferdy's affairs with other men while Seb taunts Ferdy about his sexuality. In a rage, Ferdy trashes Seb's car although the police are unable to link him to the crime as both Miles and Egg act as unwitting alibis. Miles is furious about having lied to the police and the animosity between him and Ferdy remains throughout most of series two until the final episodes of the series when he invites him to his wedding to Francesca.

Ferdy continues a stream of relationships throughout the latter half of series two. He initially tries to involve himself in the gay club scene with Warren's friend Paul but finds it is too camp and leaves. Later, he begins a relationship with Lenny, a Scottish handyman who visits the house after the boiler breaks. Despite their intimacy, Ferdy finds their gay-presenting relationship unsettling and picks up a girl from a local club, although she leaves after Miles reveals Ferdy likes men, too. Ferdy later reconciles with Lenny and they attend Miles and Francesca's wedding together, take drugs and have sex in the toilets, where Ferdy tells Lenny that he loves him.

Ten years later, it is revealed that Ferdy has died – his funeral is the catalyst for the original five housemates to reunite. In the interim period, Ferdy and Warren reunited, living together for five years prior to Ferdy's death.

== Music ==
An unknown Ricky Gervais, partner of producer Jane Fallon, was credited as "Music Advisor" for the series, and commissioned the theme tune written by The Way Out. In 2000, BBC Music issued a compilation CD featuring the theme tune and songs from the 1990s by bands including Blur, The Charlatans, The Lightning Seeds, Pulp, Jamiroquai, Manic Street Preachers, Suede, Oasis, The Divine Comedy, Everything but the Girl, New Order, Skunk Anansie, The Clash, Happy Mondays, The Prodigy, and Supergrass.

== Legacy ==
The second series ended with a close-up of an advert for the house, and the original intention was to re-cast with new characters. The provocative stage writer Mark Ravenhill was involved in drafting storylines and early scripts for a third series, but the plans were aborted, and the decision was taken to end the programme "on a high".

In 1998, Adam Buxton and Joe Cornish parodied This Life in their sketch show The Adam and Joe Show

In 2001, NBC broadcast a loosely adapted American remake titled First Years. It attracted scathing reviews and low ratings.

The young production team behind This Life went on to further success:

- Jane Fallon went on to become Executive Producer on the Channel 4 series Teachers, which also starred Andrew Lincoln.
- Joe Ahearne later went on to write and direct the cult Channel 4 series Ultraviolet (1998), which also starred Jack Davenport. He also directed episodes of the first series of the revived Doctor Who in 2005.
- Matthew Graham co-created the BBC One series Life on Mars (2006) and has written episodes of Hustle, Spooks, and three episodes of Doctor Who, one in 2006 and two in 2011.
- Ian Iqbal Rashid went on to write and direct the feature films Touch of Pink (Sony Pictures Classics, 2004) and How She Move (Paramount Vantage, 2008). He is also writer and executive producer on the Peabody Award winning series Sort Of (CBC/HBO Max, 2020–2024).

== Home media ==
Title	Release date	# discs	BBFC rating
The Complete Series 1	27 February 2006	2	18
The Complete Series 2	27 February 2006	6	18
Complete Series 1 & 2	27 February 2006	8	18
+10	26 February 2007	1	15
The Complete Collection	18 April 2016	9	18
