= Daniela Nardini =

Scottish actress (born 1966)

- Born: 26 April 1966 (age 60)
- Education: St Mary's Primary School; Royal Scottish Academy of Music and Drama
- Occupations: psychotherapist and former actress

Daniela Nardini (born 26 April 1966) is a Scottish psychotherapist and former actress who played Anna Forbes in the BBC Two television series This Life. The role earned her a BAFTA Best Actress award in 1998 and also earned her a Scottish BAFTA. She won a second Scottish BAFTA in 2009 for her role in Annie Griffin's New Town.

== Early life and education ==
Nardini was educated at St Mary's Primary School in Largs, a Catholic primary school; her secondary school was Largs Academy, the local mixed-religion comprehensive. She then trained as an actress at the Royal Scottish Academy of Music and Drama in Glasgow. Her parents managed Nardini's, an ice cream parlour and restaurant in Largs. This was mentioned on the BBC lexicographical programme Balderdash and Piffle. She spoke about her family in the context of the mysterious history of the 99 Flake ice cream.

When she was 16, Nardini's elder brother was killed in a car accident. She was on the point of giving up acting and training to become a drama teacher when she was offered the part of Anna in This Life.

In 2024, Nardini qualified as a psychotherapist.

== Career ==
She played ruthless estate agent, Meredith McIlvanney, in the Annie Griffin comedy-drama New Town, shown on BBC Four in February 2009, for which she won a Scottish BAFTA. Other television appearances include Reckless (1997); Big Women (1998); Undercover Heart (1998); Love in the 21st Century (1999); Tube Tales (1999); Rough Treatment (2000); Sirens (2002); Outside the Rules (2002) and Quite Ugly One Morning (2004).

She appeared as Lady Huntly in the four-hour BBC epic Gunpowder, Treason & Plot in 2004, and played a shopaholic in Shiny, Shiny Bright New Hole in My Heart, again for the BBC, in 2006. Also in 2006, she reprised the role of Anna Forbes for the 10th anniversary reunion episode of This Life (This Life +10), which was shown on BBC Two in January 2007, and in November 2007, she read a story for Junior Jackanory on CBeebies. She appeared in an episode of the Inspector Morse spin-off series Lewis in 2008. In 2010 she also appeared in an episode of "Vera" entitled "The Crow Trap" based on the book by Ann Cleeves.

She has appeared in several films, including Elephant Juice (1999), written by This Life creator Amy Jenkins; Cargo (2004), and Festival (2005), a film comedy about the Edinburgh Festival. Although the film was not well received by critics and performed poorly at the box office, it was nominated for six Scottish BAFTAs. She also has extensive stage experience including the lead role in David McVicar's production of Camille at the Lyric, Hammersmith in 2003; Top Girls at the Citizens Theatre, Glasgow (2004) and Cue Deadly at the Riverside Studios (2004). In 2005, Nardini appeared in the title role in Etta Jenks at the Finborough Theatre, London. Between July and October 2009, she appeared in A Streetcar Named Desire at the Donmar Warehouse in London.

In 2007 Nardini played Servalan in B7 Productions Blake's 7 Audio adventures.

In late November 2012, Nardini joined the cast of BBC One's drama Waterloo Road for the third instalment of its eighth series, filming on location in Greenock, Scotland. Her character, Esther Fairclough, is a passionate, driven but maverick science teacher who has an unconventional approach to inspiring her pupils. Nardini says: "Esther is mildly dangerous with the potential to get more so. She is passionate about her cause but unfortunately doesn't know how to encourage and promote her views without getting carried away."

Nardini plays Chris Guthrie's mother in the 2015 film Sunset Song.

In 2025, Psychology Today listed Nardini as a qualified and practising psychotherapist, having qualified the previous year.

== Personal life ==
In an interview in 2020, Nardini said she lived in Glasgow with her daughter.
