= Sirens (2002 serial) =

- Genre: Crime drama
- Written by: Chris Lang
- Directed by: Nicholas Laughland
- Starring: Daniela Nardini; Greg Wise; Robert Glenister; Sarah Parish; Anthony Calf
- Country of origin: United Kingdom
- Original language: English
- No. of series: 1
- No. of episodes: 2

Production
- Executive producers: Judy Counihan; Kumari Saldago
- Producer: Margaret Mitchell
- Running time: 90 minutes (w/advertisements)
- Production company: SMG Productions

Original release
- Network: ITV
- Release: 13 October – 14 October 2002

Sirens is a two-part British television crime drama, broadcast on ITV on 13 and 14 October 2002. The serial stars Daniela Nardini as D.C. Jay Pearson, a detective within the serious crime group, tasked with investigating a serial rapist who is attacking lone young women in and around Islington. The serial received good reception, with 6.99 million viewers tuning in for episode 1, and 6.46 million tuning in for episode 2.

Production on the serial began in June 2001. A DVD of the serial was released on 3 October 2006 in the United States.

== Cast ==
- Daniela Nardini as D.C. Jay Pearson, SCG detective
- Greg Wise as Oliver Rice, Ali's boyfriend and a main suspect in the case
- Robert Glenister as D.I. Clive Wilson, Jay's boss and nemesis
- Sarah Parish as Ali Pearson, Jay's sister and Oliver's girlfriend
- Anthony Calf as Anthony Soames, a patient of Rice's who also comes under suspicion
- Nisha Nayar as D.C. Kate Oakley, Jay's work partner
- Roger Griffiths as D.C. Steve Copley, a fellow SCG detective
- Alan Williams as D.C.I. Struther, head of department
- Ifan Meredith as D.C. Perry Collins, a fellow SCG detective

== Critical reception ==
Andrew Anthony of The Guardian said the series "was unique in that it was worth watching — almost all the way up until its, inevitably, silly end. A sort of homage to modern American movies, that are in turn a homage to film noirs, it boasted a lush score, a sharp script, frisky camera work, sound acting and some imaginative locations. A little too imaginative in some cases."

== Episodes ==
No.	Title	Directed by	Written by	Original release date	UK viewers (millions)
1	"Episode 1"	Nicholas Laughland	Chris Lang	13 October 2002	6.99
A series of sex attacks on lone woman walking home in Islington leads the Serious Crime Group to believe that a serial rapist is on the loose. With a lack of DNA or forensic evidence to suggest a suspect, D.I. Clive Wilson (Robert Glenister) finds his investigation is dwindling. D.C. Jay Pearson (Daniela Nardini) uncovers a piece of evidence from the scene of one of the attacks which could point towards the identity of the attacker, but Wilson refuses to let her follow it up, having developed a grudge against her after she rebuffed his drunken advances two nights previously. Meanwhile, Jay's sister, Ali (Sarah Parish) has just moved down to London with her new boyfriend Oliver (Greg Wise). As Ali and Jay begin to get re-acquainted, the attacker strikes again. Jay decides to follow up on her initial find in her own time, but her subsequent investigation leads her to a possible name, much to the dismay of D.I. Wilson. Meanwhile, D.C. Oakley (Nisha Nayar) uncovers CCTV evidence which points the finger towards Ali's boyfriend, Oliver, who is seen near to the scene of the latest attack - forcing Jay to choose between her newfound family loyalty and her career when Oliver is pulled in for questioning by D.I. Wilson.
2	"Episode 2"	Nicholas Laughland	Chris Lang	14 October 2002	6.46
Jay follows up on the theory that Anthony Soames (Anthony Calf) could be the man they are looking for, and when bank statements confirm that the payslip found at the scene of one of the assaults belongs to him, Wilson organises an arrest. However, whilst Soames is in custody, a further attack occurs, which convinces Wilson that Rice was their man all along. D.C. Copley (Roger Griffiths) subsequently uncovers information to suggest that Rice was previously accused of rape back in 1987. Wilson orders Jay and Kate to interrogate Rice's girlfriend, forcing Jay to make a difficult moral decision. Forensics uncovers evidence supposedly found on Rice's clothing relating to the latest attack - so when Rice is subsequently arrested, Jay is forced to admit that she was with him at the time of the latest assault - securing his alibi, but leading to her suspension, and placing Wilson under investigation for tampering with the evidence. Also suspended, Wilson continues to conduct his own investigation, once again speaking to the woman who previously accused Rice of rape fifteen years ago. Wilson confronts Jay with the evidence, leading to a shocking and tragic confrontation for everyone involved in the case.
