= Annmarie Morais =

Jamaican-Canadian screenwriter (born 1973)

- Born: 1973 (age 52–53); Jamaica
- Education: Bachelor of Fine Arts
- Alma mater: York University, Toronto, Ontario, Canada
- Occupation: Screenwriter
- Known for: Writing the film How She Move
- Notable work: How She Move was accepted into the 2007 Sundance, Film Festival.
- Awards: Nicholl Fellowship in Screenwriting

Annmarie Morais (born 1973 in Jamaica) is a Jamaican-Canadian screenwriter best known for writing the film How She Move. She earned a BFA from York University in Film and Video in 1995.

Morais won funding for two Vision TV Cultural Diversity Drama Competition movies: Hotel Babylon and Da Kink in My Hair, which aired on Vision in 2004 and 2005. Hotel Babylon is the story of immigrants working in a hotel in Winnipeg, Canada. Kink was adapted from the Trey Anthony play about a beauty parlour in a Jamaican-Canadian neighbourhood. Morais was also a writer and story editor on the television series adapted from the play, which aired on Global in 2007.

== Nicholl Prize ==
Morais was the first Canadian to win the prestigious Nicholl Fellowship in Screenwriting. She was also the first person to win the Nicholl with a resubmitted script. Bleeding was a finalist in 1998, and she resubmitted it without changes in 1999. The prize, administered by the Academy of Motion Picture Arts & Sciences, garnered Morais $25,000.

== How She Move ==
While at York, Morais had produced a short documentary Steppin on step-dancing in Toronto's Jane-Finch neighborhood. In 2004, she received Telefilm financing to produce a feature film based on the same concept. Originally titled Step, the film How She Move was accepted into the 2007 Sundance Film Festival. At Sundance, a bidding war resulted in a $3.4 million offer from Paramount and MTV Films. The film received wide release in the United States and Canada in January 2007.

== Current projects ==
Splitting her time between Los Angeles and Toronto, Morais has created a television show for ABC Family about high-school cheerleaders, called The Flip Side. She is also writing a thriller set in London, The Collectors to be directed by fellow Jamaican-Canadian Clement Virgo and adapting Jane Finlay-Young's novel From Bruised Fell.

== Sources ==
- Brantford screenwriter hits it big Brantford Expositor February 1, 2008
- Sundance interview
