= The Book Group =

- The cast of The Book Group
- Genre: Sitcom
- Created by: Annie Griffin
- Starring: Anne Dudek; Michelle Gomez; James Lance; Rory McCann; Saskia Mulder; Bonnie Engstrom
- Country of origin: United Kingdom
- Original language: English
- No. of series: 2
- No. of episodes: 12

Production
- Running time: approx 23 minutes

Original release
- Network: Channel 4
- Release: 12 April 2002 – 28 February 2003

The Book Group is a British comedy drama that was broadcast on Channel 4 between 2002 and 2003 and ran for two seasons. It was written and directed by the American-born, Glasgow resident Annie Griffin, who also wrote and directed Festival. It was the winner of two BAFTA Scotland awards.

In January 2006, it was announced that screenwriter Andrew Davies would make a feature film adaptation of The Book Group for Film 4, but the project was never started.

== Plot ==
The Book Group revolved around the life of American Clare Pettengill (Anne Dudek) who at the start of the series had recently moved from Cincinnati, Ohio to Glasgow, Scotland. She starts a book club to try find friends with similar interests. Those she encounters are not what she expected; a drug-addled, egotistical postgraduate student (and subsequently his neurotic and ever-worrying brother), an easy-going disabled man who aims to be a writer, three discontented footballers' wives, and a straggler who hides his homosexuality with an obsession for football. All of the members are brought together not so much by the books that they read (if they read them at all) but their own longings for companionship, and ambitions to better their lives. Some episodes are titled for the book that is discussed in the group.

== Books ==
In each episode the club have a book that they are supposed to read and discuss.

=== Season one ===
1. On the Road, Jack Kerouac
2. The Alchemist, Paulo Coelho
3. Love in the Time of Cholera, Gabriel García Márquez
4. The Little Engine That Could, Watty Piper
5. A fictional book: 'Dark Alley' by 'Martin Logan'
6. The Diving Bell and the Butterfly, Jean-Dominique Bauby

=== Season two ===
1. Don Quixote, Miguel de Cervantes
2. Hunger, Knut Hamsun
3. Collected poetry by Rainer Maria Rilke
4. Driving Over Lemons: An Optimist in Andalucia, Chris Stewart
5. The Sexual Life of Catherine M., Catherine Millet
6. The Map of Love, Ahdaf Soueif

== Critical reception ==
Reviewing The Book Group for The Guardian, Gareth McLean stated "the acting is as cracking as the script and the production values" and described the show as "a genuine ensemble drama in which everyone plays a vital part".

== Cast ==
- Anne Dudek as Clare Pettengill
- Rory McCann as Kenny McLeod
- Derek Riddell as Rab
- Michelle Gomez as Janice McCann
- James Lance as Barney Glendenning/Lachlan Glendenning
- Saskia Mulder as Fist de Grooke
- Bonnie Engstrom as Dirka Nilssen
- Gotti Sigurdarson as Lars Nilssen
- Desmond Hamilton as Jackie McCann
- Jack McElhone as Wee Jackie McCann
- Karen Kilgariff as Jean Pettengill (Series 2)
- Kerry McGregor as Carol Ann (Series 2)
- Henry Ian Cusick as Miles Longmuir (Series 2)
- Ben Miller as Martin (Series 1, 2 episodes)
- Andoni Gracia as Anselmo (Series 2, 2 episodes)

== Crew ==
- Writer: Annie Griffin
- Director: Annie Griffin
- Producers: Anita Overland (series one), Derrin Schlesinger (season two)

== Episodes ==
=== Season one ===
1. "On The Road"
2. "The Alchemist"
3. "Magical Realism"
4. "Bedtime Stories"
5. "Dark Alley"
6. "A Little More Living"

=== Season two ===
1. "Sueños"
2. "Hunger"
3. "You Must Change Your Life"
4. "Drowning"
5. "Research"
6. "A'salaam Insha'lah"
