= List of Chef! characters =

This is a list of characters that appeared on the BBC sitcom Chef!, which aired from 1993 to 1996.

== Major characters ==
=== Gareth Blackstock ===
- Played By: Lenny Henry
- Appears In: Series 1-3

Gareth Blackstock is the chef de cuisine and sometime co-owner of Le Chateau Anglais, a restaurant in Oxfordshire, specializing in twists on traditional French cuisine. He has attained two Michelin stars. He buys Le Chateau Anglais in Series One, with his wife, Janice, and they own and manage the restaurant through to the end of Series Two. Blackstock's expertise is well known, and he finished first in an international cooking competition. His temper is also well known, and he can be exceptionally rude to his staff, customers, and family members.

=== Janice Blackstock ===
- Played By: Caroline Lee-Johnson
- Appears in: Series 1-3

Janice Blackstock is Gareth's wife; the two had been married for 8 years at the beginning of Series 1. She left a career in London to move to Oxfordshire with Gareth. When the couple purchase Le Chateau Anglais, she becomes the restaurant manager and attempts to impose restrictions on Gareth's free-spending ways in the kitchen in order to turn a profit. She also spends much of the time thinking of new avenues of publicity. In Series 3, she and Gareth split temporarily, but are reunited when she is discovered to be pregnant.

=== Everton Stonehead ===
- Played By: Roger Griffiths
- Appears in: Series 1–3

Everton Stonehead went to school with Gareth growing up and dreams of becoming a top chef one day. He convinces Gareth to take him on as an assistant for no wages to learn the trade while Everton is supported by an aunt. Everton bumbles through his early days in the kitchen, but eventually becomes adept at cooking, helping Gareth with Caribbean cuisine and developing a signature dish of his own. By the end of the series, Everton has become a sort of confidant for Gareth. Everton nearly always ends his sentences with "sort of thing," often to comical effect.

== Kitchen staff ==
=== Lucinda ===
- Played By: Claire Skinner
- Appears in: Series 1

Lucinda is promoted to sous chef at the beginning of Series I, being the most talented and capable of Gareth's kitchen staff. Despite her talent, it takes a budget cut to earn her promotion, which comes with no increase in pay. She has Gareth's respect and stands up to him more than any of the other staff will. Although generally more good-tempered than Gareth, angering Lucinda is just as unwise, as she is just as scathing and even more ruthless than he.

=== Gustave LaRoche ===
- Played By: Ian McNeice, 3 episodes in 1994 and Jeff Nuttal, 6 episodes in 1996
- Appears in: Series 2, 3

Gustave LaRoche was a talented chef about ten years before the setting of the show. His real name is Gary Lamston (spelling uncertain), but he changed his name because, in his day, one had to be French to be taken seriously as a chef. In Series 2 ("A River Runs Through It") Gareth seeks him out to replace Lucinda as sous chef. He is found working in The Provençal, a small restaurant in an out-of-the-way town. It is later revealed that his alcoholism forced him to such a small kitchen where he did not cook with wine. Gareth, Janice and Everton help him to receive treatment for his alcoholism, but he does have relapses. In series 3, he mostly dislikes Savannah but on occasion teams up with her to achieve a goal, such as firing Reeny/Renee.

=== Piers ===
- Played By: Gary Parker
- Appears in: Series 1

Piers is a kitchen laborer who often deals with the presentation of food. His penchant for smoking marijuana nearly gets Gareth into legal trouble while he is out searching for unpasteurized Stilton cheese. Piers frequently finds himself on the receiving end of Gareth's fiery temper, in fact he is a close second to Everton in the verbal abuse stakes.

=== Otto ===
- Played By: Erkan Mustafa
- Appears in: Series 1

Otto is a kitchen staff worker. He doesn't appear to be especially talented nor especially incompetent.

=== Crispin ===
- Played By: Tim Matthews
- Appears in: Series 2

Crispin is a kitchen staff worker. Crispin is revealed to come from a wealthy background and has picked up some amorous habits from his father.

=== Donald ===
- Played By: Gary Bakewell
- Appears in: Series 2

Donald is a kitchen staff worker. He has a poor relationship with his father.

=== Debra ===
- Played By: Pui Fan Lee
- Appears in: Series 2

Debra is a kitchen staff worker. She also is a hopeless romantic who is especially susceptible to the smell of onions.

=== Alice ===
- Played By: Hilary Lyon
- Appears in: Series 2

Alice is a kitchen staff worker. She especially dislikes Gustave, seeming to resent Gareth's decision to hire a sous chef from outside the restaurant instead of promoting her.

=== Savannah Concord ===
- Played By: Lorelei King
- Appears in: Series 3

Savannah is a talented sous chef who began working at Le Chateau between series 2 and 3. She is American, and frequently reminisces about her glamorous life at home. Savannah takes Alice's place as Gustave's main rival. Savannah becomes involved in several complicated romantic situations: she develops an attraction to Gareth, but spurns Cyril, the restaurant owner for part of the show's run. In the final episode, Gareth dramatically stops her from returning to America, leading her to threaten him with a knife, until he assures her that he only wants her to run the restaurant while he reconciles with Janice.

=== Renée Bryson ===
- Played By: Sophie Walker
- Appears in: Series 3

Renée is a kitchen staff worker and the daughter of Cyril, the owner of the restaurant. She has no talent for cooking and the other staff largely resents her presence. Renée is very sensitive about her name, and the rest of the staff mispronounces it (using the faux-British pronunciation "Reeney") to upset her frequently. She has a short-lived romance with Everton, but does not take their breakup nearly as hard as he does. They later reconcile.

== Support staff ==
=== Lola ===
- Played By: Elizabeth Bennett
- Appears in: Series 1

Lola serves as the Maître d' of Le Chateau Anglais. She is especially fond of food and spends much effort attempting to sample all of Gareth's dishes, noting that each is her “favourite.” She is surprisingly sensitive to Gareth's moods and how he might react to situations; in the first episode, she correctly guesses the right moment to interrupt Gareth's tirade at a customer and expresses astonishment that said customer has met people as rude as Gareth before.

=== Alphonse ===
- Played By: Jean Luc Rebaliati
- Appears in: Series 2

Alphonse is the new sommelier, and at some point takes over from Lola as Maître d'. Gareth appears to trust Alphonse and incorporates him in the occasional scheme to show Everton up. Alphonse also helps Gareth find satisfactory English wine to use in a cooking competition.

=== Cyril Bryson ===
- Played By: Dave Hill
- Appears in: Series 3

Cyril buys Le Chateau Anglais from Gareth and Janice when it goes into financial trouble. He is enamoured with Savannah, the American sous chef. Gareth and Cyril get into frequent arguments about business decisions, including Reneé's presence in the kitchen.
