= Jack McElhone =

Scottish actor

- Born: 1994 (age 31–32); Scotland
- Occupation: Actor
- Years active: 2002–2009

Jack McElhone (born 1994) is a Scottish former actor. He is famous for his role as Frankie in the 2004 film Dear Frankie, for which he was nominated for a BAFTA Scotland Award. He also had roles in Young Adam, The Book Group, Stacked and Nowhere Boy.

== Filmography ==
Year	Title	Role	Notes
2002–2003	The Book Group	Wee Jackie	TV series
2003	Young Adam	Jim Gault	Film
2004	Dear Frankie	Frankie	Film
2008	Stacked	Alex	TV series
2009	Nowhere Boy	Eric Griffiths	Film
