= Celluloid Dreams =

French film production and distribution company

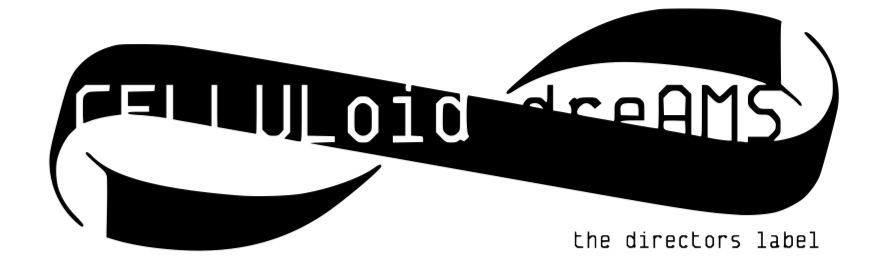
- Industry: Film production; Film distribution
- Founded: 1987; 39 years ago
- Founder: Hengameh Panahi
- Headquarters: Paris, France
- Area served: Worldwide
- Key people: Hengameh Panahi (Chairman)
- Website: www.celluloid-dreams.com

Celluloid Dreams (stylized as CELLULoid dreAMS) is a French film production and distribution company that also operates as an international sales company. Additionally, the company runs a video on-demand platform, The Auteurs, in conjunction with The Criterion Collection. Celluloid Dreams has been involved in films such as Palindromes, Son of Rambow, DiG!, I'm Not There, How She Move and Funny Games. The company has promoted films from areas with which Western moviegoers are unfamiliar, such as Iran, and films by a wide variety of directors, including Jia Zhangke, Shannon Murphy, and Alexander Sokurov.
