= TSAR Publications =

Toronto-based nonprofit book publisher

TSAR Publications is a Toronto-based nonprofit book publisher focusing on multicultural literature, particularly Canadian authors and subject matter.

TSAR Publications began as the literary journal The Toronto Review of Contemporary Writing Abroad (which was previously called The Toronto South Asian Review) in 1981, by M. G. Vassanji and Nurjehan Aziz, among others. Authors that appeared in the Toronto Review include Austin Clarke, Michael Ondaatje, David Dabydeen, Ian Iqbal Rashid and Dionne Brand. The press was established in 1985 with the publication of a volume of essays on South Asian literature in North America. TSAR has published works on Canadian Studies, Postcolonial literature, Women's Studies, African literature, Asian literature, Caribbean Literature, and Canadian Literature.

In 2015, TSAR Publications changed its name to Mawenzi House.
