= Leonie Elliott =

English actress (born 1988)

Leonie Samantha Elliott (born 1988) is an English actress, best known for her role as Lucille Anderson in the BBC series Call the Midwife. She also starred as Cherry Patterson in the Lenny Henry comedy-drama Danny and the Human Zoo.

== Early life ==
Elliott was born in Brent, London in 1988. Her family emigrated from Jamaica in the 1960s. She began acting at eight years old. She attended the Harris School of speech and drama and trained as an actress at the Identity School of Acting in London. Elliott attended the Ellen Wilkinson School for Girls in Ealing.

== Career ==
Elliott played Fiona in the British anthology series Black Mirror, in 2016. Also in 2016, she appeared in an episode of the BBC medical series Casualty.

She appeared as Cherry Patterson in the Lenny Henry comedy-drama Danny and the Human Zoo, shown on BBC One in August 2015. Other television appearances include Undercover Heart (1998); Tube Tales (1999); Holby City (2002) and The Bill (2004).

She has appeared in several films, including Wondrous Oblivion (1999), written by Paul Morrison, a rite of passage film about 11-year-old David Wiseman who is mad about cricket but no good at it. She played Jamaican immigrant Judith Samuels, a shy but gifted cricket player who quickly strikes up a friendship with David. Her stage roles include The Lion King at Lyceum Theatre, London (1998), Annie, UK Tour (1999). In 2012, Elliott appeared in Concrete Jungle written by Bola Agbaje at the Riverside Studios, London. Between November 2015 and January 2016, she appeared in The Lion, The Witch and the Wardrobe at the Birmingham Repertory Theatre in Birmingham.

In 2016, Elliott appeared in "Hated in the Nation," an episode of the anthology series Black Mirror.

In January 2018, she made her debut in the hit BBC series Call the Midwife as Jamaican nurse Lucille Anderson, whose character was based on the many Caribbean nurses who moved to the UK to assist the growing demand of the National Health Service in the 1960s.

On 14 September 2019, she appeared on the celebrity edition of The Chase on ITV, where she won £1,000 for the team, before eventually being eliminated in the Final Chase.

== Filmography ==
=== Film ===
Year	Title	Role	Notes
1999	Tube Tales	Rosebud	
2003	Wondrous Oblivion	Judy Samuel	
2018	Boogie Man	Sophie Cooke	
2023	Trinidad Remains	(TBA)	

=== Television ===
Year	Title	Role	Notes
1998	Undercover Heart	Holly Lomas	6 episodes
2003	Holby City	Josie Bond	Episode: "Going It Alone"
2003	The Bill	Natasha Harris	Episode: "135: Sunday Driver"
2013	Ones N Twos	Stephanie	—N/a
2015	Danny and the Human Zoo	Cherry Patterson	Television film
2016	Black Mirror	Fiona, Clara's Flatmate	Episode: "Hated in the Nation"
2016	Casualty	Natalie Stubbs	Episode: "Not in Holby Anymore"
2017	The Break	Fee	Episode: "Scotch Bonnet"
2018	Damned	Melanie (Teaching Assistant)	Episode #2.5
2018	Killed by My Debt	Hollie	Television film
2018	Children in Need	Lucille Anderson	Episode dated 16 November 2018
2018–2023	Call the Midwife	Nurse Lucille Anderson	33 episodes
2025	EastEnders	Charlotte	—N/a
