= Roger Griffiths =

English actor (born 1965)

- Born: 6 February 1965 (age 61); England
- Occupation: Actor
- Years active: 1986–present
- Television: Chef! Family Affairs; EastEnders

Roger Griffiths (born 6 February 1965) is an English actor who has had several roles in television.

== Career ==
He first rose to prominence opposite Lenny Henry as Gareth Blackstock's foil Everton Stonehead in BBC One 1990s sitcom Chef!. Before starring in Chef, Griffiths played a minor role as a news reporter in the Channel 4 British sitcom Desmond's in 1990. Later in 1990, he appeared in an episode of Birds of a Feather, series 2, episode 4: "Muesli", as Daryl's fellow inmate.

Following the run of Chef!, Griffiths played a pirate named Captain Kevin in the BBC educational numeracy television series Numbertime.

Since then, Griffiths has played recurring characters on British soap operas. In 1999 and 2000, he played the role of DS Paul Timpney on police drama The Bill for five episodes. He joined the cast of Holby City in 2006, after a run on EastEnders as DI Riddick, and on Family Affairs as Gabriel Drummond. He was a series regular in Vexed (2010–2012), and BBC One's Lenny Henry In Pieces in 2003. In 2010, he appeared in the Only Fools and Horses prequel, Rock & Chips, as Clayton Cooper. In 2016, he played the part of Newton Farrell in the Death in Paradise episode "The Blood Red Sea". He rejoined the cast of EastEnders in 2018 as Mitch Baker, the father of Keegan Baker. He left the series in December 2023.

Griffiths has also had minor film roles (such as Batman Begins and Buffalo Soldiers), and a minor role in the Doctor Who episode "Planet of the Ood". In 2018, he appeared in series 5 of Still Open All Hours.

== Filmography ==
=== Film ===
Year	Title	Role	Notes
1991	Ama	Joe	
1996	Hard Men	Lenny	
1999	Greenwich Mean Time	Denton	
1999	Tube Tales	Charlie	Segment: Grasshopper
2001	Buffalo Soldiers	Simmons	
2005	Batman Begins	Arkham Uniformed Policeman	
2007	Deadmeat	Froggy	
2013	Communion	Inspector Matthews	
2013	Life Sentence	Ray	Short film
2014	Dangerous Mind of a Hooligan	Rowentree	
2015	Hard Time Bus	Fitzy	
2017	Bonded by Blood 2	D.S. Lyons	
2022	The Mistress	Don	Short film

=== Television ===
Year	Title	Role	Notes
1986	London's Burning	Lloyd	Television film
1988	Small World	Cleaner	Mini-series; Episode 2: "The Lady of Situations"
1988	Me and My Girl	Brendan	Series 6; episode 7: "A Bit of Overtime"
1989	Hard Cases	Workman	Series 2; episode 5
1989	4 Play	Bike Messenger	Series 1; episode 6: "Shalom Joan Collins"
1990	Birds of a Feather	Gary	Series 2; episode 4: "Muesli"
1990–1991	Desmond's	Leroy Smart	Series 2; episode 3, and series 3; episode 3
1991	Casualty	Philip	Series 6; episode 4: "Hide and Seek"
1991	Lazarus & Dingwall	Suspect	Episode 6: "The Little Red Mark on the Side of the Head"
1992	The Bill	Malcolm Grant	Series 8; episode 6: "Fair Play"
1992	The Ruth Rendell Mysteries	Roy Smith (painter)	Series 6; episode 7: "An Unwanted Woman: Part Two"
1993–1996	Chef!	Everton Stonehead	Series 1–3; 19 episodes
1994	Class Act	Roy	Series 1; episode 6
1994	Finney	Doyle	Episodes 3–6
1996	Thief Takers	Jim Gillespie	Series 1; episode 2: "Company of Strangers"
1997	Captain Butler	Cliff	Episodes 1–6
1998–1999	Numbertime	Captain Kevin	Series 5–7; 20 episodes
1999	Mike & Angelo	Smith	Series 11; episode 5: "Men in Brown"
1999	Trust	Trevor Macer	2-part television film
1999–2000	Comin' Atcha!	Uncle Rudi	Series 1; episode 5, and series 2; episodes 4–7
1999–2000	The Bill	D.S. Paul Timpney	Series 15; episodes 33–36
2000	Forgive and Forget	Carlton	Television film
2000	Harry Enfield's Brand Spanking New Show		Episodes 1 & 8
2000	Lenny Henry in Pieces	Various	Unknown episodes
2001	Casualty	Royston Phillips	Series 15; episode 34: "Mix and Match"
2001	Heartbeat	Daniel Moketso	Series 11; episode 4: "Legacies"
2001	Dr. Terrible's House of Horrible	Mozim & Unim Pawtont	Episode 5: "Voodoo Feet of Death"
2002	Paradise Heights	Bobby Fulton	Series 1; episode 2
2002	Sirens	D.S. Steve Copley	2-part television film
2002–2003	Family Affairs	Gabriel Drummond	28 episodes
2004	French and Saunders		Series 6; episode 4
2004–2005	EastEnders	D.I. Chris Riddick	18 episodes
2005	Spider-Plant Man	Man on Train	Television short film (for Comic Relief). Uncredited role
2005–2009	Dubplate Drama	D-Brain	Series 1–3; 14 episodes
2006	Doctors	Patrick Turner	Series 8; episode 7: "Full Disclosure"
2006	My Family	Radio DJ	Series 6; episode 3: "The Spokes Person"
2008	Doctor Who	Commander Kess	Series 4; episode 3: "Planet of the Ood"
2009	Hustle	Lennie	Series 5; episode 5: "Politics"
2010	Rock & Chips	Clayton Cooper	Pilot episode
2010–2012	Vexed	Tony	Series 1; episodes 1–3, and series 2; episodes 1–6
2011	Doctors	Ian Milligan	Series 12; episode 196: "Saints and Sinners"
2014	Casualty	Paul Mason	Series 28; episode 39: "To Yourself Be True"
2016	Death in Paradise	Newton Farrell	Series 5; episode 7: "The Blood Red Sea"
2016	A Midsummer Night's Dream	Oberon	Television film (CBeebies version)
2016	Doctors	Graham McAllister	Series 18; episode 92: "Life Unexpected"
2017	Casualty	Marty Williams	Series 32; episodes 6, 10 & 16
2018	Still Open All Hours	Mr. Norman	Series 5; episode 6
2018	Enterprice	Paul	Series 1; episodes 1–4
2018–2023	EastEnders	Mitch Baker	439 episodes
2019	Waffle the Wonder Dog	Grand	Series 3; episode 11: "Waffle the Grand-dog"
2020–2021	The Rubbish World of Dave Spud	Headmaster	Series 2; 52 episodes
2021	Dodo	Tom Toosley	Series 1; episode 17: "Cosmic Frisbee"
2023–2025	Dreaming Whilst Black	Uncle Claude	12 episodes
2025	Shakespeare & Hathaway: Private Investigators	Paul Belch	Series 5; episode 3: "Destruction, Blood and Massacre"
