= João Costa Menezes =

Portuguese film director, producer, and actor

João Costa Menezes is a London-based Portuguese film actor, film producer and film director.

== Filmography (director/producer) ==
- 2010 – Loucura
- 2009 – Fado
- 2008 – Mulheres, Bah!
- 2007 – Remember my dream
- 2006 – Agur
- 2004 – Serial Killer
- 2001 – Akasha
- 2000 – Zero

== Filmography (actor) ==
- 2008 – Mulheres, Bah! (voice-over)
- 2005 – Perfect Day
- 2005 – Incessant
- 2004 – Serial Killer
- 2004 – Armed for Glory
- 2004 – Quality Indigo
- 2003 – Somnis entre boires
- 2001 – Akasha
- 2000 – Zero
- 2000 – Kiss Kiss (Bang Bang)
- 1999 – Honest
- 1999 – Gladiator
- 1999 – Jonathan Creek (TV)
- 1999 – Gormenghast (TV)
- 1999 – Tube Tales
- 1999 – Sunburn (TV)

== Filmography (crew) ==
- 2006 – Dirty Bomb (1st AD)
- 2006 – On The Other Side (2d AD)
- 2005 – Charlie (Production Assistant)
- 2005 – The Poker Academy (camera assistant)
- 1998 – Waves Without Sound (Script Supervisor)
- 1998 – The Maddest Man (Sound Assistant)
