= Touch of Pink =

- DVD cover
- Directed by: Ian Iqbal Rashid
- Written by: Ian Iqbal Rashid
- Produced by: Martin Pope; Jennifer Kawaja; Julia Sereny
- Starring: Jimi Mistry; Kyle MacLachlan; Kristen Holden-Ried
- Cinematography: David A. Makin
- Edited by: Susan Maggi
- Music by: Andrew Lockington
- Production companies: Sienna Films; Martin Pope Productions
- Distributed by: Sony Pictures Classics (Canada; through Mongrel Media); Redbus Film Distribution (United Kingdom and Ireland)
- Release dates: 19 January 2004 (Sundance); 16 July 2004
- Running time: 90 minutes
- Countries: Canada; United Kingdom
- Box office: $581,055

Touch of Pink is a 2004 Canadian-British gay-themed romantic comedy film written and directed by Ian Iqbal Rashid and starring Jimi Mistry, Kyle MacLachlan, and Kristen Holden-Ried. The film takes its title from the Cary Grant film That Touch of Mink.

== Plot ==
Alim is a young gay man, born in Kenya and raised in Toronto, Canada. He moved to London to get away from his conservative Muslim upbringing. When his widowed mother, Nuru, announces an unplanned visit that involves staying with him, it creates hardship in the relationship with his boyfriend Giles because they must pretend to be only flatmates, and forces Alim to deal with coming out to his mother. Meanwhile, Alim has an imaginary friend who appears as Cary Grant, and gives Alim advice when he is in trouble; unfortunately, the advice often seems to result in more trouble.

== Cast ==
- Jimi Mistry as Alim
- Suleka Mathew as Nuru Jahan
- Kristen Holden-Ried as Giles
- Kyle MacLachlan as the spirit of Cary Grant
- Veena Sood as Dolly
- Brian George as Hassan
- Liisa Repo-Martell as Delia
- Raoul Bhaneja as Khaled
- Malika Mendez as Sheruba
- Linda Thorson as Giles' mother
- Andrew Gillies as Raymond
- Dean McDermott as Alisdair Keith

== Reception ==
Touch of Pink premiered at the 2004 Sundance Film Festival to great acclaim, a bidding war, and eventually, a sale to Sony Pictures Classics for the world excluding the U.K., Ireland, India and Greece.

The film received mixed reviews in its theatrical release; the consensus states: "Kyle MacLachlan does a very good imitation Cary Grant in this forced and contrived tale."

The film grossed $564,535 domestically and $16,520 internationally for a worldwide total of $581,055.

== Soundtrack ==
1. "Sailing on the Real True Love" - Emilie-Claire Barlow
2. "Loving the World" - Emilie-Claire Barlow
3. "Lies of Handsome Men" - Cleo Laine
4. "O Rama" - Susheela Raman
5. "Nagumomo" - Susheela Raman
6. "Summer Son" - Texas
7. "When You Want Me" - Breakpoint feat. Jon Banfield
8. "Tu Jahan Jahan Chalega" (taken from Bollywood film Mera Saaya) - Lata Mangeshkar
9. "Xic" - Me and My
10. "Concierto Grosso in a Minor-1st MVT" - Antonio Vivaldi

== See also ==
- List of LGBTQ-related films by storyline
