= Clare Clifford =

British actress

Clare Clifford is a British actress, comedian and drama lecturer who appeared in the television dramas Angels and This Life.

She attended Selwyn Independent School for Girls in Matson, Gloucester, then studied at the Royal Central School of Speech and Drama and appeared on stage at the Oxford Playhouse and the National Theatre. Other television credits include Doctor Who, Bergerac, Cardiac Arrest, Peak Practice, The Bill, Cider with Rosie, Torchwood, and Casualty. In 2021, she appeared in an episode of the BBC soap opera Doctors as Patricia Stanton.

Clifford has made the transition from actress to feminist stand-up comedian and performed her routine at the Bad Wolf Doctor Who convention in Birmingham, July 2007. In 2010 she gained an MA in screenwriting from the London College of Communication which is part of the University of the Arts London.

== Roles ==
In This Life, Clifford played the recurring character Sarah Newly..

Her Doctor Who appearance was as Kyle in the serial Earthshock(1982), a role she later revisited in the documentary Tales of the TARDIS. Other television credits include Celia Beresford in Heartbeat, Lavinia in Drop the Dead Donkey, Harriet in Home to Roost,a doctor in Birds of a Feather, and Jay Harmsworth in Holby City She played Milton in Torchwood, where she is sometimes credited as "Claire Clifford".

Her film work includes Mrs. Haddon-Bell in Miss Potter(2006) and Margery in Miss Pettigrew Lives for a Day (2008). On stage, she appeared as Miss Ramsden in the National Theatre Live broadcast of Man and Superman
