= Ian Iqbal Rashid =

British film director and poet

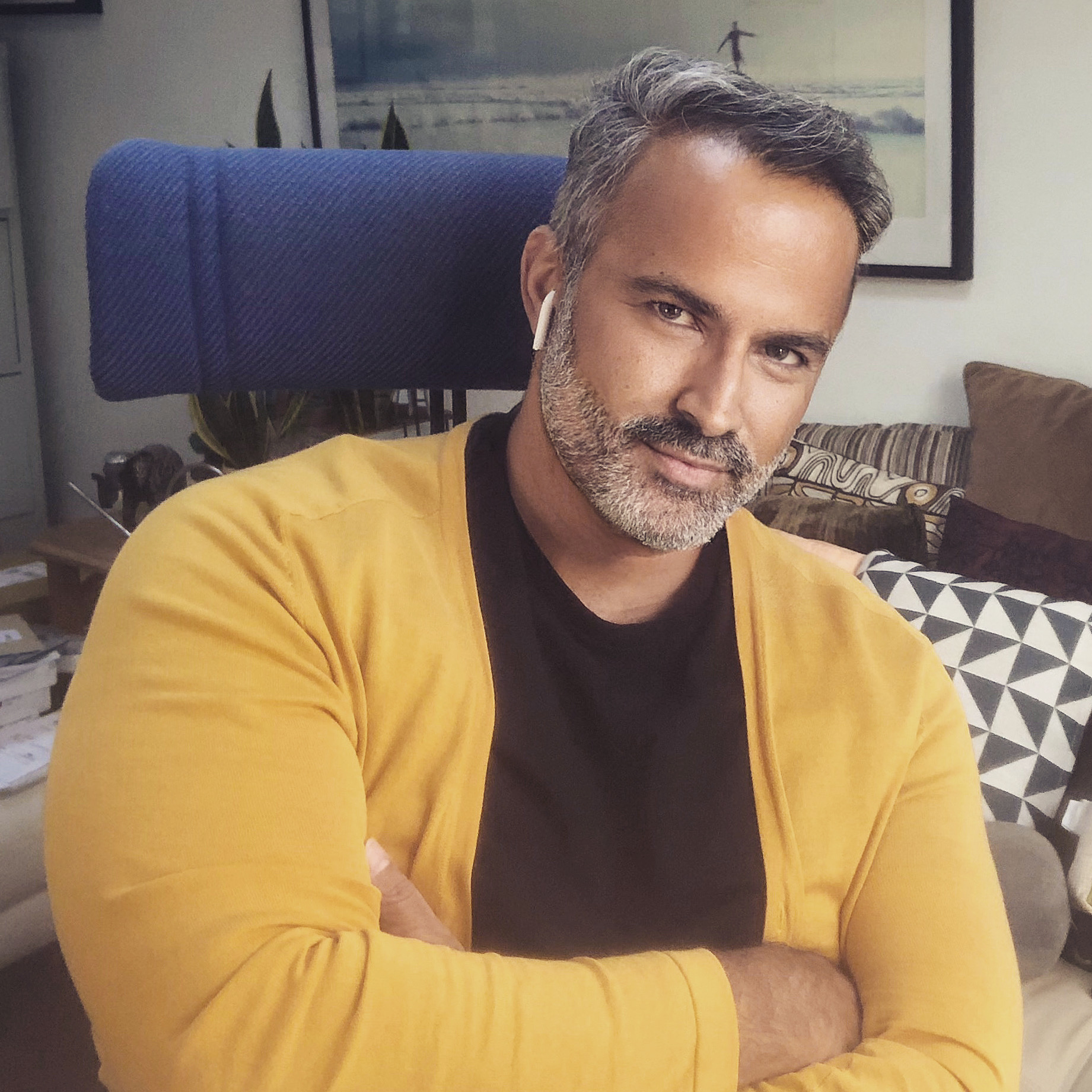
- Rashid in 2021
- Born: 1968 (age 57–58); Dar es Salaam, Tanzania
- Occupations: Filmmaker; screenwriter; poet

Ian Iqbal Rashid (born in Dar es Salaam, Tanzania) is a filmmaker, screenwriter, and poet, known for his volumes of poetry, for his work on the Peabody Award-winning and Canadian Screen Award-winning HBO Max/CBC TV series Sort Of (2021–2023), for writing on the cult British TV series This Life (1996), and for directing the feature films Touch of Pink (2004) and How She Move (2007), both of which premiered at the Sundance Film Festival to critical acclaim.

== Early life ==
Of Indian ancestry and raised in the Ismaili Muslim faith, Rashid's family lived in colonial East Africa for generations. Rashid's family was forced to leave Tanzania when he was a small child. After failing to secure asylum in the UK and US, they settled in Toronto. Rashid began his career as an arts journalist, critic, curator, and events programmer, particularly focussed on South Asian diasporic, Muslim and LGBTQ+ cultural work.

== Works ==
=== Television and radio ===
Rashid began working as a writer in UK television in the late 1990s, trained on the BBC's Black Screen internship. His early credits include Dilly Downtown, and the soap London Bridge (Carlton Television for ITV). For BBC's Woman's Hour Programme, Rashid wrote and directed Leaving Normal, a comedy serial about same-sex adoption starring Imelda Staunton and Meera Syal. Rashid first attracted notice for the cult, BAFTA-winning BBC TV series, This Life, for which he won a Writer's Guild of Great Britain award. Since then, Rashid has written for broadcasters and companies such as Showtime, Lionsgate, Amazon Prime Video, ITV (TV network) and Sphere Media.

Between 2021 and 2023, he wrote and co-executive produced across three seasons of the critically acclaimed and Peabody Award-winning TV series Sort Of, which has appeared on many end-of-year best lists. For Sort Of, he has been nominated for Best Writing in a Comedy Series at the 10th Canadian Screen Awards and at the 2022 Writers Guild of Canada Awards for his work on the episode titled "Sort Of Mary Poppins".

Rashid is currently developing Nobel Prize laureate Abdulrazak Gurnah's novel Afterlives into a series for Razor Film and Warp Films. He also has projects in development with Crave and the Canadian Broadcasting Corporation.

=== Film ===
Self-taught as a filmmaker, in 1991, Rashid made the short film Bolo Bolo! with Kaspar Saxena. The film, part of an HIV/AIDS cable access series called Toronto Living With AIDS, resulted in the series being pulled from Rogers Television after complaints about sexually suggestive content, though it later screened at film festivals internationally. Rashid went on to write two award-winning short films, Surviving Sabu (1999, Arts Council of England) and Stag (2001, BBC Films).

Touch of Pink, Rashid's first feature film, spent 12 years in development. In 2003, he finally had the chance to direct the project as a Canada-UK co-production. It premiered at the 2004 Sundance Film Festival to great acclaim, a bidding war, and eventually, a sale to Sony Picture Classics. The film has attracted extensive scholarly commentary. In 2024, the Sanghum Film Collective hosted a 20th-anniversary screening and celebration of the film at the legendary Paradise Theatre in Toronto.

His second feature film as a director, How She Move, received a similarly positive reception at the Sundance Film Festival in 2007, where it was nominated for a Sundance World Cinema Grand Jury Prize and subsequently purchased by Paramount Vantage. The film opened to positive reviews and strong box office.

=== Poetry and short stories ===
Rashid published his first poetry collection, Black Markets, White Boyfriends and Other Acts of Elision, in 1991. He later followed this with the chapbook Song of Sabu in 1993, and The Heat Yesterday in 1995. In 2018, Rashid began publishing poetry again.

His poems including "Another Country", "Could Have Danced All Night", "Hot Property", and "Early Dinner, Weekend Away" have appeared in journals and been anthologized in John Barton and Billeh Nickerson's 2007 anthology Seminal: The Anthology of Canada's Gay Male Poets. More of his poems are included in the 2009 anthology Forbidden Sex, Forbidden Texts: New India's Gay Poets. He is referenced in the Oxford Companion to Canadian Literature and Making a Difference: Canadian Multicultural Literature.

He wrote and read his short story, "Muscular Bridges", for BBC Radio 4's 50th HMT Windrush Anniversary, which later evolved into the feature film Touch of Pink.

=== Journalism ===
In the late 1980s, Rashid was a regular contributor to the Canadian LGBT magazine Rites, and the cultural journals Fuse and TSAR Publications. In 1995, he was the Guest Editor for Rungh magazine's Queer Special Issue. His curatorial catalogue essay for "Beyond Destinations", a show he curated for Ikon Gallery in 1993, was reprinted in Rungh in December 2019. He was also assistant editor of Bazaar Magazine, a quarterly journal covering the South Asian arts scene in the UK in the early 1990s. Ian's personal essays have also been published in Wasafiri, Third Text and The Globe and Mail.

=== Curating and festivals ===
Rashid has also curated film programmes and exhibitions for venues such as the National Film Theatre, the Institute of Contemporary Arts and Experimenta. He was the founder and first director of Desh Pardesh, Canada's first arts festival focusing on diasporic South Asian arts and culture.

== Personal life ==
Rashid is openly gay. In the early 1990s, Rashid moved to London, where he met his partner, the writer, curator, and academic Peter Ride.

== Awards ==
Rashid won the Writer's Guild of Great Britain Award for Television Series Writing (for This Life) and the Aga Khan Award for Excellence in the Arts.

He was selected as one of 2010's Breakthrough Brits on the prestigious UK Film Council (BFI) programme alongside Riz Ahmed, Yann Demange, Daniel Kaluuya and others. In 2022, Ian was awarded a fellowship on the CBC-BIPOC TV & Film Showrunner Catalyst in partnership with the Canadian Film Centre as an emerging television/streaming showrunner.

His work as a writer and executive producer on the show Sort Of earned him a Peabody Award in 2021 and another nomination in 2022. For Sort Of, he has also been nominated for Best Writing in a Comedy Series at the 10th Canadian Screen Awards and at the 2022 Writers Guild of Canada Awards for his work on the episode titled "Sort Of Mary Poppins".

His poetry has been nominated for the Gerald Lampert Award.
