= How She Move =

- Promotional film poster
- Directed by: Ian Iqbal Rashid
- Written by: Annmarie Morais
- Produced by: Brent Barclay; Colin Brunton; Jennifer Kawaja; Claire Prieto; Julia Sereny
- Starring: Rutina Wesley; Dwain Murphy; Tracey "Tre" Armstrong; Brennan Gademans; Clé Bennett; Kevin Duhaney
- Cinematography: André Pienaar
- Edited by: Susan Maggi
- Music by: Andrew Lockington
- Production companies: Sienna Films; Celluloid Dreams
- Distributed by: Mongrel Media (Canada); Paramount Vantage; MTV Films (International)
- Release dates: January 23, 2007 (Sundance); January 15, 2008 (Canada); January 25, 2008 (United States)
- Running time: 98 minutes
- Countries: Canada; United States; France
- Language: English
- Budget: $17 million
- Box office: $8.5 million

How She Move is a 2007 drama film directed by Ian Iqbal Rashid and starring Rutina Wesley, Clé Bennett and Romina D'Ugo. The film showcases the street culture of step dancing. The film was produced by Celluloid Dreams, Sienna Films, Paramount Vantage and MTV Films.

== Plot ==
Unable to afford the tuition needed to fund her private school education, Rayanna or Raya (Rutina Wesley) returns to her family home in the city while reluctantly re-evaluating her future. Upon learning that the top prize for an upcoming step-dancing competition is $50,000, Raya uses her impressive moves to earn a coveted slot in her good friend Bishop's (Dwain Murphy) predominantly male JSJ crew. Isolated from the local women due to jealousy and separated from her fellow dancers by her sex, the ambitious dancer is subsequently kicked off the team for showing off during a preliminary competition. Now, if Raya has any hope of realizing her medical school dreams, she will have to either earn back Bishop's trust or organize her own dance crew and start over from scratch. In the end, she eventually learns "how she move".

== Cast ==
- Rutina Wesley as Rayana 'Raya' Green
- Dwain Murphy as Bishop
- Clé Bennett as Garvey
- Romina D'Ugo as Selia
- Kevin Duhaney as E.C.
- Shawn Desman as Trey
- Nina Dobrev as Tall Girl In The Bathroom
- Brennan Gademans as 'Quake'
- Merwin Mondesir as Niko Niles
- Tré Armstrong as Michelle
- Jason Harrow as himself
- Jai Jai Jones as Lester Johnson
- Tristan D. Lalla as Manny 'Big Man Manny'
- Daniel Morrison as Wayne
- Keyshia Cole as herself
- DeRay Davis as himself
- Melanie Nicholls-King as Faye Green, Raya's Mom

== Production and release ==
How She Move was originally slated to open in Canada in March 2007, but when it picked up a distribution deal from American companies Paramount Vantage and MTV Films (both owned by Viacom) at the 2007 Sundance Film Festival, the release date was pushed back to allow for reshooting several of the dance sequences, particularly the finale. The film was shot on Super 16mm for $5 million, and Paramount invested another $2 million in the new sequences, re-editing and new sound mix. They created a new soundtrack with American and Canadian hip-hop artists. The film was originally set and shot in Toronto, however; Paramount edited out references of the team travelling from Toronto to Detroit for the dance competition following test audience screenings. They, along with MTV, spent another $10 million in promotion and distribution to 1500 theatres in the United States and 50 in Canada.

== Critical reception ==
How She Move received generally positive reviews. On the review aggregator website Rotten Tomatoes, 67% of 78 critics' reviews are positive. The website's consensus reads: "Despite a formulaic plot, the energetic and gritty How She Move is elevated by a commanding debut performance by Rutina Wesley." Metacritic, which uses a weighted average, assigned the film a score of 63 out of 100, based on 21 critics, indicating "generally favorable" reviews.

== Home media ==
The film was released on DVD on April 29, 2008.

== Soundtrack ==
According to the film's MySpace page, the official track listing is as follows:

1. "G-Slide (Tour Bus)" – Lil Mama feat. Kadar
2. "Out Here" – Mayhem Morearty
3. "My Boots" – Montell Jordan
4. "Perfect" – Carl Henry
5. "Jane & Finchin'" – Smugglaz
6. "It Don't Make Any Difference To Me" (acoustic version) – Kevin Michael feat. Akil Dasan
7. "Hot Hot Hot" – Montell Jordan
8. "Reflectionz" – Fenom
9. "Ms. Golly" – Lenn Hammond
10. "Rude Girl Remix" – Montell Jordan
11. "Monster" – Saukrates
12. "Work That Stick" – Montell Jordan
13. "Still Burnin'" – Fenom
14. "Don't Let It Slip Away" – Mood Ruff and Shadez
15. "Tempo" – K Smith
16. "Touch it" – Busta
