= Amy Jenkins =

English novelist and screenwriter

- Born: 1963 (age 62–63); London
- Occupations: Novelist; Screenwriter
- Years active: 1995–present
- Notable work: This Life
- Spouse: Jonathan Heawood (m. 2004)
- Children: 1
- Parents: Peter Jenkins; Polly Toynbee (stepmother)

Amy Jenkins (born 1963, in London) is an English novelist and screenwriter. She is the daughter of political journalist Peter Jenkins and the stepdaughter of The Guardian columnist and author Polly Toynbee. In 2004, she married Jonathan Heawood, and they have one son.

Jenkins was educated at Pimlico School, a state secondary, before attending the sixth form of the private Westminster School. She went on to study law at University College London. Jenkins turned to writing and in 1996 achieved her first significant success with This Life, a BBC television drama series about the lives and loves of a household of solicitors and barristers. She devised the series and wrote several episodes.

Other film, television and journalism work followed and in 1998 she secured a two-novel contract, her first novel, Honeymoon, appearing in 2000. Although it was the second biggest debut novel of the year, selling over 250,000 copies in the UK and Commonwealth, critics noted that a central plot device in Jenkins' work possessed a striking similarity to the premise of Noël Coward's play Private Lives. In Honeymoon a man and woman who seven years previously had a brief affair meet again when they find themselves staying in adjacent hotel rooms on their respective honeymoons; at the opening of Coward's play a divorced couple find themselves honeymooning in adjacent hotel rooms. Her second novel, Funny Valentine, was published in 2002. She wrote and produced the feature film Elephant Juice, released in 2000. She has directed three short films including the "Mr Cool" segment of Tube Tales.

An anniversary special of This Life was broadcast on BBC Two at 9 pm on 2 January 2007.

Jenkins wrote the biographical drama Daphne, screened on BBC Two in 2007, celebrating the centenary of the birth of Daphne du Maurier.

She co-wrote, with Peter Morgan, episode 4 of the second series of The Crown.
