= Annie Griffin =

American writer and director

- Born: 1960 (age 65–66); New York City, United States
- Occupations: Writer; Director
- Years active: 1987-present
- Notable work: The Blackbeard Pirate; Coming Soon; The Book Group; Festival

Annie Griffin (born 1960) is an American writer and director.

== Early life and education ==
Griffin was born in New York City and relocated to the United Kingdom in 1981.

== Career ==
Griffin started as an experimental theatre writer and director in the 1980s, with her first notable work being Blackbeard the Pirate in 1987, at the ICA in London. In the early 1990s she worked creating animated idents for MTV. In 1993 she worked as an actress in the Oscar nominated short animated film The Village (animated short film). Through the 1990s she worked on a number of short works including the Seven Sins:Wrath which featured Paul Kaye and David Walliams.

In 1999, Griffin wrote and directed Coming Soon.

Griffin wrote and directed The Book Group, a comedy drama which aired on Channel 4 in the United Kingdom between 2002 and 2003, and ran for two series. It was the winner of two BAFTA Scotland awards.

In 2005, Griffin wrote and directed Festival a black comedy set during the Edinburgh Festival Fringe.

In 2011, Griffin directed two episodes of the Channel 4 comedy-drama series Fresh Meat. When the series returned in 2012, she directed episodes five to eight, and also wrote episode six.
