= Festival (2005 film) =

- DVD cover
- Directed by: Annie Griffin
- Written by: Annie Griffin
- Produced by: Christopher Young
- Starring: Chris O'Dowd; Daniela Nardini; Stephen Mangan; Clive Russell
- Cinematography: Daniel Cohen
- Edited by: William Webb
- Music by: Jim Sutherland
- Distributed by: Pathé
- Release date: 15 July 2005
- Running time: 107 minutes
- Country: United Kingdom
- Language: English

Festival is a 2005 British black comedy film about a number of people at the Edinburgh Festival Fringe directed by Annie Griffin. The general shots of the festival were filmed during the 2004 event.

== Main characters and sub plots ==
The characters' stories become interconnected.

- Faith (Lyndsey Marshal) arrives in Edinburgh to put on her one-person play about Dorothy Wordsworth. She finds companionship with Brother Mike (Clive Russell), who is performing a show about paedophile priests, before eventually revealing himself as one.
- Tommy O'Dwyer (Chris O'Dowd) - an Irish stand-up, who tries to seduce local radio host Joan Gerrard (Daniela Nardini).
- Sean Sullivan (Stephen Mangan) - famous comedian. He antagonises many people, especially Gerrard and his fellow jurors at the Comedy Awards. His alcoholic assistant, Petra (Raquel Cassidy), feels particularly put-upon.
- Joan Gerard (Daniela Nardini) - local radio host covering the festival. An early argument with Sullivan during a live radio interview sets the tone for their antagonistic relationship. She is also a juror for the Comedy Awards. Sullivan taunts her during the discussion sessions because of her acquaintance with O'Dwyer, who is nominated.
- Nicky Romanowski (Lucy Punch) - ambitious young hack comedian and Award nominee.
- Micheline Menzies (Amelia Bullmore) - wife of an Edinburgh lawyer who is suffering from post natal depression, and runs off with a Canadian fringe festival actor Rick (Jonah Lotan).
