= List of awards and nominations received by Line of Duty =

Accolades for British TV series

Line of Duty awards and nominations
- Line of Duty title card
Awards and nominations
Award	Wins	Nominations
Association of Motion Picture Sound Awards	0	1
Australian Directors' Guild Awards	0	1
British Academy Cymru Awards	0	1
British Academy Scotland Awards	0	5
British Academy Television Awards	0	10
British Academy Television Craft Awards	0	5
British Screenwriters' Awards	1	1
Broadcast Magazine Awards	0	5
Broadcasting Press Guild Awards	4	12
Casting Director Guild Awards	0	1
Celtic Media Festival Awards	1	3
Crime Thriller Awards	1	4
DIVA Awards	1	1
Diversity in Media Awards	0	2
Edgar Allan Poe Awards	1	1
Edinburgh TV Awards	0	2
Freesat Awards	1	1
Irish Film & Television Awards	0	5
National Television Awards	1	7
Rockie Awards	1	1
Royal Television Society Craft & Design Awards	0	1
Royal Television Society Midlands Awards	2	5
Royal Television Society Northern Ireland Awards	2	7
Royal Television Society Programme Awards	1	7
Royal Television Society Scotland Awards	0	1
Satellite Awards	0	2
South Bank Sky Arts Awards	0	3
Television and Radio Industries Club Awards	1	1
Televisual Bulldog Awards	3	5
TV Choice Awards	5	9
TVTimes Awards	1	3
Writers' Guild of Great Britain Awards	0	2

Totals (Note: Certain award groups do not simply award one winner. They acknowledge several different recipients, have runners-up, and have third place. Since this is a specific recognition and is different from losing an award, runner-up mentions are considered wins in this award tally. For simplification and to avoid errors, each award in this list has been presumed to have had a prior nomination.)
- Wins: 27
- Nominations: 115

Line of Duty is a British police procedural and serial drama consisting of six series that was created by Jed Mercurio and broadcast by the British Broadcasting Corporation (BBC). The first three series spanned a total of 17 episodes and aired on BBC Two between 2012 and 2016. The remaining three series comprised 19 episodes and aired on BBC One from 2017 to 2021. Produced by World Productions, the series was primarily filmed in Belfast although filming for the first series took place in Birmingham. Mercurio wrote all 36 episodes and serves as an executive producer alongside Simon Heath and Stephen Wright. It was distributed internationally Content Media Group which was eventually purchased by Kew Media Distribution and later ITV Studios following Kew Media's collapse.

The series primarily follows the actions of Anti-Corruption Unit 12 (AC-12), a task force located within the fictional Central Police Constabulary. AC-12 is led by Superintendent Ted Hastings, portrayed by Adrian Dunbar, who appeared in the first series and was promoted to the main cast beginning with the second series. Martin Compston and Vicky McClure also starred in all six series as AC-12 officers Steve Arnott and Kate Fleming. Each series features an additional actor as part of the main cast who portrays a police officer that is being investigated by AC-12. These roles were performed by Lennie James in series one, Keely Hawes in series two, Daniel Mays in the third series, Thandie Newton in series four, Stephen Graham in series five, and Kelly Macdonald in the sixth and final series. Craig Parkinson was an additional member of the second and third series cast, while Hawes' role extended into the third. Parkinson also appeared in the first series prior to being promoted. The characters of Parkinson and Hawes were both killed off at the end of series three; Parkinson however, appeared as a guest star in one episode of each of the two following series in flashback scenes. Jessica Raine starred in a single episode of the second series and Jason Watkins appeared in two episodes of the fourth series; both were credited with the other principal cast members. Additionally, Anna Maxwell Martin was also featured as part of the starring cast in the fifth and sixth series, but only appeared in the latter portion of each series. Over the course of the series, an overarching storyline develops that connects numerous characters to an organised crime group which is found to be in a large conspiracy with high-ranking officers of the police department.

Viewing figures increased significantly over the course of the series, leading to record-breaking broadcasts and causing it to become the subject of critical acclaim as well as gaining a cult following. Line of Duty has been nominated for a total of 115 awards, winning 27 of them. A large portion of the nominations resulted from British Academy of Film and Television Arts and Royal Television Society-related awards, which are collectively responsible for 42 of them. A third of the series' successful awards were won at the TV Choice and Broadcasting Press Guild Awards. Dunbar and McClure tie for the most nominations received by cast members, each holding seven, followed by Compston with five and Hawes with three. McClure and Hawes have the most wins by a cast member with two each. Individual series and the programme as a whole secured a total of 46 nominations. The largest portion were acquired by the sixth series while the fifth and sixth series gained the most wins in this aspect. Four awards out of 12 nominations were given to Mercurio for his writing on the series. Internationally, Line of Duty has also picked up a win from the American Edgar Allan Poe Awards and a nomination in the Australian Directors' Guild Awards.

== Awards and nominations ==
List of awards and nominations received by Line of Duty
Award	Year (Note: The year listed refers to that in which the award ceremony took place.)	Category	Nominee(s)	Result	Ref(s).
Association of Motion Picture Sound Awards	2018	Excellence in Sound for a Television Drama	Pietro Dalmasso, Paul Maynes, Bea O'Sullivan, and Ian Wilkinson	Nominated	
Australian Directors' Guild Awards	2021	Best Direction in a Television Miniseries	Daniel Nettheim for "Episode 1"	Nominated	
British Academy Cymru Awards	2022	Director – Fiction	Gareth Bryn	Nominated	
British Academy Scotland Awards	2014	Best Television Actor	Mark Bonnar	Nominated	
British Academy Scotland Awards	2016	Best Director Film/Television	Michael Keillor	Nominated	
British Academy Scotland Awards	2021	Best Television Actress	Kelly Macdonald	Nominated	
British Academy Scotland Awards	2021	Audience Award	Kelly Macdonald	Nominated	
British Academy Scotland Awards	2021	Audience Award	Martin Compston	Nominated	
British Academy Television Awards	2015	Best Drama Series	Line of Duty series 2	Nominated	
British Academy Television Awards	2015	Best Leading Actress	Keely Hawes	Nominated	
British Academy Television Awards	2015	Best Supporting Actress	Vicky McClure	Nominated	
British Academy Television Awards	2017	Virgin TV's Must-See Moment	"Urgent Exit Required"	Nominated	
British Academy Television Awards	2017	Best Supporting Actor	Daniel Mays	Nominated	
British Academy Television Awards	2018	Best Drama Series	Line of Duty series 4	Nominated	
British Academy Television Awards	2018	Best Leading Actress	Thandie Newton	Nominated	
British Academy Television Awards	2018	Best Supporting Actor	Adrian Dunbar	Nominated	
British Academy Television Awards	2018	Virgin TV's Must-See Moment	"Huntley's Narrow Escape"	Nominated	
British Academy Television Awards	2020	Virgin TV's Must-See Moment	"John Corbett's Death"	Nominated	
British Academy Television Craft Awards	2015	Best Writer – Drama	Jed Mercurio	Nominated	
British Academy Television Craft Awards	2018	Best Editing: Fiction	Andrew John McClelland for "Episode 4"	Nominated	
British Academy Television Craft Awards	2022	Best Editing: Fiction	Andrew John McClelland	Nominated	
British Academy Television Craft Awards	2022	Original Music	Carly Paradis	Nominated	
British Academy Television Craft Awards	2022	Best Sound: Fiction	Pietro Dalmasso, Ronan Hill, Paul Maynes, and Ian Wilkinson	Nominated	
British Screenwriters' Awards	2017	Best Crime Writing on Television	Jed Mercurio	Won	
Broadcast Magazine Awards	2013	Best Drama Series	Line of Duty series 1	Nominated	
Broadcast Magazine Awards	2015	Best Drama Series	Line of Duty series 2	Nominated	
Broadcast Magazine Awards	2015	Best Independent Production Company	World Productions	Nominated	
Broadcast Magazine Awards	2015	International Programme Sales	Kew Media Distribution	Nominated	
Broadcast Magazine Awards	2017	Best Drama Series	Line of Duty series 3	Nominated	
Broadcasting Press Guild Awards	2013	Best Drama Series	Line of Duty series 1	Nominated	
Broadcasting Press Guild Awards	2013	Best Writer	Jed Mercurio	Nominated	
Broadcasting Press Guild Awards	2015	Best Drama Series	Line of Duty series 2	Nominated	
Broadcasting Press Guild Awards	2015	Best Actress	Keely Hawes	Nominated	
Broadcasting Press Guild Awards	2015	Best Writer	Jed Mercurio	Nominated	
Broadcasting Press Guild Awards	2017	Best Drama Series	Line of Duty series 4	Nominated	
Broadcasting Press Guild Awards	2017	Best Actress	Keely Hawes	Won (Note: Also for The Durrells and The Missing)	
Broadcasting Press Guild Awards	2018	Best Drama Series	Line of Duty series 4	Won	
Broadcasting Press Guild Awards	2018	Best Actress	Thandie Newton	Nominated	
Broadcasting Press Guild Awards	2018	Best Writer	Jed Mercurio	Won	
Broadcasting Press Guild Awards	2020	Best Actor	Stephen Graham	Won (Note: Also for A Christmas Carol and The Virtues)	
Broadcasting Press Guild Awards	2022	Best Drama Series	Line of Duty series 6	Nominated	
Casting Director Guild Awards	2020	Best Casting in a Television Drama	Gordon Cowell, Daniel Edwards, and Kate Rhodes-James	Nominated	
Celtic Media Festival Awards	2017	Drama Series	Line of Duty series 3	Won	
Celtic Media Festival Awards	2020	Drama Series	Line of Duty series 5	Nominated	
Celtic Media Festival Awards	2022	Drama Series	Line of Duty series 6	Nominated	
Crime Thriller Awards	2012	TV Dagger	Line of Duty series 1	Nominated	
Crime Thriller Awards	2014	TV Dagger	Line of Duty series 2	Nominated	
Crime Thriller Awards	2014	Best Actress	Keely Hawes	Won	
Crime Thriller Awards	2014	Best Supporting Actress	Vicky McClure	Nominated	
DIVA Awards	2022	Media Moment of the Year	Line of Duty series 6	Nominated	
Diversity in Media Awards	2017	TV Moment of the Year	"Urgent Exit Required"	Nominated	
Diversity in Media Awards	2017	TV Moment of the Year	"DCI Roz Huntley Interview"	Nominated	
Edgar Allan Poe Awards	2020	Best Episode in a TV series	Jed Mercurio for "Episode 4"	Won	
Edinburgh TV Awards	2018	Best UK Drama	Line of Duty series 4	Nominated	
Edinburgh TV Awards	2019	Best Drama Series	Line of Duty series 5	Nominated	
Freesat Awards	2014	Best TV Drama	Line of Duty series 2	Won	
Irish Film & Television Awards	2018	Best Drama	Line of Duty series 4	Nominated	
Irish Film & Television Awards	2018	Best Actor in a Leading Role	Adrian Dunbar	Nominated	
Irish Film & Television Awards	2020	Best Actor in a Leading Role	Adrian Dunbar	Nominated	
Irish Film & Television Awards	2021	Best Drama	Line of Duty series 6	Nominated	
Irish Film & Television Awards	2021	Best Actor in a Leading Role	Adrian Dunbar	Nominated	
National Television Awards	2018	Best Crime Drama	Line of Duty series 4	Nominated	
National Television Awards	2020	Outstanding Drama Series	Line of Duty series 5	Nominated	
National Television Awards	2021	Best Returning Drama	Line of Duty series 6	Won	
National Television Awards	2021	Special Recognition	Line of Duty series 6	Won	
National Television Awards	2021	Best Drama Performance	Martin Compston	Nominated	
National Television Awards	2021	Best Drama Performance	Adrian Dunbar	Nominated	
National Television Awards	2021	Best Drama Performance	Vicky McClure	Nominated	
Rockie Awards	2019	Showrunner of the Year	Jed Mercurio	Won (Note: Also for The Bodyguard)	
Royal Television Society Craft & Design Awards	2014	Editing	Andrew John McClelland	Nominated	
Royal Television Society Midlands Awards	2012	Best Drama	Line of Duty series 1	Nominated	
Royal Television Society Midlands Awards	2012	Best Male Actor	Lennie James	Nominated	
Royal Television Society Midlands Awards	2012	Best Newcoming Actor	Gregory Piper	Nominated	
Royal Television Society Midlands Awards	2019	Best Female Actress	Vicky McClure	Won	
Royal Television Society Midlands Awards	2019	Best Writer	Jed Mercurio	Nominated	
Royal Television Society Northern Ireland Awards	2015	Best Drama	Line of Duty series 2	Won	
Royal Television Society Northern Ireland Awards	2016	Best Drama	Line of Duty series 3	Nominated	
Royal Television Society Northern Ireland Awards	2017	Best Drama	Line of Duty series 4	Won	
Royal Television Society Northern Ireland Awards	2017	Original Music Score	Carly Paradis	Nominated	
Royal Television Society Northern Ireland Awards	2019	Best Drama	Line of Duty series 5	Won	
Royal Television Society Northern Ireland Awards	2022	Best Drama	Line of Duty series 6	Nominated	
Royal Television Society Northern Ireland Awards	2022	Original Music	Carly Paradis	Nominated	
Royal Television Society Programme Awards	2013	Best Drama Series	Line of Duty series 1	Nominated	
Royal Television Society Programme Awards	2013	Best Male Actor	Lennie James	Nominated	
Royal Television Society Programme Awards	2013	Best Writer	Jed Mercurio	Nominated	
Royal Television Society Programme Awards	2015	Best Drama Series	Line of Duty series 2	Won	
Royal Television Society Programme Awards	2017	Best Drama Series	Line of Duty series 3	Nominated	
Royal Television Society Programme Awards	2017	Best Drama Writer	Jed Mercurio	Nominated	
Royal Television Society Programme Awards	2018	Best Female Actress	Thandie Newton	Nominated	
Royal Television Society Scotland Awards	2017	Television Director of the Year	Michael Keillor	Nominated	
Satellite Awards	2022	Best Drama Series	Line of Duty series 6	Nominated	
Satellite Awards	2022	Best Actress in a Drama Series	Kelly Macdonald	Nominated	
South Bank Sky Arts Award	2013	TV Drama	Line of Duty series 1	Nominated	
South Bank Sky Arts Award	2015	TV Drama	Line of Duty series 2	Nominated	
South Bank Sky Arts Award	2018	TV Drama	Line of Duty series 4	Nominated	
Television and Radio Industries Club Awards	2020	Crime Programme	Line of Duty series 5	Won	
Televisual Bulldog Awards	2015	Best Drama Series	Line of Duty series 2	Nominated	
Televisual Bulldog Awards	2015	Best Editing	Andrew John McClelland	Nominated	
Televisual Bulldog Awards	2018	Best Drama Series	Line of Duty series 4	Won	
Televisual Bulldog Awards	2018	Best Writer	Jed Mercurio	Won	
Televisual Bulldog Awards	2020	Best Drama Series	Line of Duty series 5	Won	
TV Choice Awards	2016	Best Drama	Line of Duty series 3	Nominated	
TV Choice Awards	2019	Best Drama	Line of Duty series 5	Won	
TV Choice Awards	2019	Best Actress	Vicky McClure	Nominated	
TV Choice Awards	2019	Best Actor	Adrian Dunbar	Won	
TV Choice Awards	2019	Best Actor	Martin Compston	Nominated	
TV Choice Awards	2021	Best Drama	Line of Duty series 6	Won	
TV Choice Awards	2021	Best Actor	Martin Compston	Won	
TV Choice Awards	2021	Best Actor	Adrian Dunbar	Nominated	
TV Choice Awards	2021	Best Actress	Vicky McClure	Won	
TVTimes Awards	2021	Favourite Drama	Line of Duty series 6	Won	
TVTimes Awards	2021	Favourite Actor	Martin Compston	Nominated	
TVTimes Awards	2021	Favourite Actress	Vicky McClure	Nominated	
Writers' Guild of Great Britain Awards	2015	Best Long Form TV Drama	Jed Mercurio	Nominated	
Writers' Guild of Great Britain Awards	2018	Best Long Form TV Drama	Jed Mercurio	Nominated	
