= Invasion: Earth (TV series) =

- Genre: Science fiction
- Written by: Jed Mercurio
- Directed by: Patrick Lau; Richard Laxton
- Country of origin: United Kingdom
- Original language: English
- No. of series: 1
- No. of episodes: 6

Production
- Running time: 50 minutes

Original release
- Network: BBC
- Release: 8 May – 12 June 1998

Invasion: Earth is a BBC science fiction TV series. It was made in collaboration with the Sci Fi Channel, and released in 1998 as six fifty-minute episodes.

== Creation and production ==
Invasion: Earth is a dark science-fiction drama about the discovery of a planned invasion and conquest of Earth by a sinister race of inter-dimensional alien beings, and the efforts of a small NATO force who strive to counter the threat.

The series was conceived, written and co-produced by Jed Mercurio, a former physician who (under the pseudonym John MacUre) gained prominence in Britain the 1990s as the creator and writer of the offbeat medical drama series Cardiac Arrest.

The principal cast included Vincent Regan, Maggie O'Neill, Fred Ward and Anton Lesser.

Invasion: Earth was a co-production between BBC Scotland and the Sci-Fi Channel. It was shot on location in Scotland with considerable assistance from the British armed forces and is also notable as one of the first British TV series to feature extensive use of computer-generated imagery (CGI).

== Episode summary ==
=== Episode 1: "The Last War" ===
In 1944, during the height of The Blitz, an unidentified object crashes into an English suburb. A bomb disposal team, led by Lieutenant Charles Tyrell (Anton Lesser), arrive on the scene. The soldiers discover two of the crashed craft's occupants; one is shot dead by a soldier while attempting to flee, while the other, badly injured occupant falls out of the craft. It soon becomes apparent that the occupants are not human, with domed heads and speckled pale skin. Tyrell establishes a rapport with the survivor just as MI6 arrives.

Fifty-four years later, in the skies over the North Sea, RAF Flight Lieutenant Chris Drake (Vincent Regan) and his navigator, Flight Lieutenant Gerry Llewellyn (Stuart McQuarrie), intercept an unidentified craft. During the ensuing encounter, both the airfield and their Tornado interceptors are seemingly attacked by a weapon that shuts off electrical power, so Drake impulsively acts against orders and shoots down the craft. In the process, his own plane is damaged, and he and Llewellyn eject over the ocean. Drake is recovered alive, but Llewellyn suffers serious injuries during ejection and dies in the sea before he can be rescued. The guilt-ridden Drake is grounded as a result of his hasty actions. The UFO, meanwhile, crashes in Scotland.

During the UFO encounter, a local group of government-sponsored university researchers, who moonlight as amateur SETI watchers, pick up a strange transmission aimed at the far reaches of space. Led by Dr Amanda Tucker (Maggie O'Neill), the group comes to the conclusion that this is an extraterrestrial message. After hearing rumours of the UFO encounter, Tucker heads for Scotland, where she meets, and, after a fortuitous meeting, she joins forces with Drake. After uncovering some of the truth behind the recent events, they are reluctantly recruited by United States Air Force Major General David Reece (Fred Ward), who believes the transmission to be terrestrial rather than alien, to decipher its meaning.

Meanwhile, RAF personnel race to capture the downed UFO pilot and recover his craft. Equipped with alien technology, including a cloaking device, the pilot evades them (despite being wounded by pursuers) but finally stops a motorist, who takes him to hospital. Once located by the military and stripped of his strange garb and apparatus, the pilot is found to be none other than Tyrell, who refuses to communicate with his captors, even though they assume him to be a test pilot for a foreign nation's air force. Meanwhile, Tucker's associate, Nick Shay (Paul J. Medford), discovers that the signal sent by the alien craft has in fact been intercepted and jammed by another force, and suggests that they might be dealing with two distinct alien races who may be in conflict with each other.

=== Episode 2: "The Fourth Dimension" ===
As NATO attempts to analyse the alien landing pod, the danger that Tyrell poses to Earth becomes apparent when, during examination, he is found to have a tracking device in his tooth. Before it can be removed, a strange portal opens, apparently attempting to capture him. During the ensuing gunfire, a policeman is killed, although the gunfight also reveals that the invaders, which the NATO team dub "nDs", are physical entities who can be harmed. Thinking that the enemy power is trying to rescue him, Tucker rips out Tyrell's tooth, but this allows the portal to home in on her instead. She and a number of RAF personnel are drawn into another portal, vanishing into the beyond.

Tyrell is taken back to the airfield and interrogated, but reveals nothing. Reece is open-minded as to the pilot's reasons, while his second-in-command, Squadron Leader Helen Knox (Phyllis Logan), angry that he may have betrayed his country to a foreign power, orders his torture. The following day, Dr Tucker and the RAF personnel sucked into the portal are returned, suffering from terrible nightmares of being tortured by strange creatures. Attempts to press them further causes terrible seizures. During the night, the RAF personnel who were kidnapped by the nDs attempt to escape, killing their guards. All but one are recaptured, that being a NATO officer who is undergoing curious physiological changes, who manages to evade capture. Tucker, on the other hand, seems fine, although she's scratched the letters "nD" into her arm, leaving a wound that seems unable to heal.

=== Episode 3: "Only the Dead" ===
Drake and Tucker, having come to the conclusion that their enemy is now extraterrestrial in origin, and that the kidnapping aliens are part of a third force unrelated to Tyrell's faction, investigate further. They finally get Tyrell to tell his story: the alien survivor from 1944 was part of a peaceful race dubbed the "Echos", who have studied other planets. After being shot down during one of their surveys, the survivor was imprisoned in a mental hospital. Tended to and studied by Tyrell, Allied high command is adamant that the traveller is the test pilot of a V-2 rocket, chosen from the Nazi concentration camps due to his physical deformities. The Echo eventually dies from ill-treatment, but not before giving Tyrell a key to alert other Echos to his presence.

Tyrell, having lived with the Echos for more than fifty years, explains that the Echoes are locked in a life-or-death struggle with an alien species (the "nDs"), a race of inter-dimensional beings who harvest organic matter in order to absorb it into their machines. The nDs exist in multiple dimensions, using portals to manipulate and interact with our own reality, although they cannot survive long in normal Earth space. Tyrell helps the RAF activate his craft and send a distress signal to the Echos. In response, a lone Echo lands in Scotland, bringing a message that its entire species has committed self-genocide rather than allow the nDs to harvest their race for their malignant ends. As a coup de grâce, Tyrell kills the last surviving Echo and explains that Tucker was taken for a reason: she has been genetically changed in order to become half-human, half-nD, an overseer for the nDs' latest crop – humanity.

=== Episode 4: "The Fall of Man" ===
The previously escaped NATO officer is running amok in the countryside. He drives to a reservoir some miles away, cuts his brachial artery and throws himself into the dam, where he bleeds to death. Meanwhile, Tucker and the RAF team use a signal device from the Echo escape pod as a lure to attract and capture an nD, but the attempt goes disastrously wrong, with the nD easily escaping from confinement, killing several personnel and destroying much of their equipment.

=== Episode 5: "The Battle More Costly" ===
It becomes slowly apparent that the NATO officer found dead in the reservoir is part of a plan to infect a local town with an illness of alien origin. It also gradually becomes evident that the events in Scotland are part of a larger conspiracy designed by the nDs and only put in motion due to Tyrell's accidental landing on Earth. When the nDs again attempt to capture Tyrell, Drake is forced to shoot him as he is being dragged into the portal, to prevent him being taken alive. As the disease spreads through the townsfolk, portal kidnappings become more frequent, and the station personnel – ignored by their superiors and lacking reinforcements – attempt to hold off the vanguard of the nD invasion, racing to develop an experimental toxin which they hope will kill the nDs.

=== Episode 6: "The Shatterer of Worlds" ===
The nDs are kidnapping the populace in order to use them as living batteries. An amorphous mountain of alien tentacles and design appears on the outskirts of Kirkhaven, and it begins expanding, swallowing up and absorbing all the surrounding organic matter and transporting it back to the nDs' realm. The Earth forces attack the structure but soon discover that conventional weapons are powerless to damage or stop it. Wishing to atone for her earlier disbelief, Squadron Leader Knox flies a Tornado jet into the portal in order to carry out reconnaissance, but she does not return and she is presumably captured or killed. Aided by her growing self-awareness of the nD mindset, Amanda uses the data collected by Preston to discover a safe passage through the nD structure. With her guidance, Drake and Amanda fly into the structure to launch a missile directly into the portal, in the hope of causing a chain-reaction that will destroy it. The plan seems to work at first, and Drake's plane successfully escapes from the collapsing nD structure, but the joy of the Earth forces proves short-lived—within moments a new structure rises up in place of the first, expanding at an even greater rate. Amanda now realises that the plan has failed and that there are probably an infinite number of other nD structures which can be 'folded down' into normal space to replace any that are destroyed.

With Earth's future in the balance, and the world finally paying attention, it becomes clear that the only chance is the use of ultimate force, so the Prime Minister authorises the detonation of a thermonuclear bomb to destroy all the organic matter in a 50-mile radius around the portal, in hopes that this will starve the nDs of raw materials and stop the portal from growing any larger. The defenders resolve that same tactic must be used again and again whenever a new portal appears, anywhere in the world. As Dr Tucker's transformation continues unabated despite all efforts, she walks out to stand in the kill zone as the bomber approaches and releases its weapon. The screen blurs to white, accompanied by the rumbling roar of a detonation, as the final credits roll.

== Cast ==
- Vincent Regan as Flight Lieutenant Chris Drake
- Maggie O'Neill as Dr Amanda Tucker
- Fred Ward as Major General David Reece
- Phyllis Logan as Squadron Leader Helen Knox
- Anton Lesser as Lieutenant Charles Tyrell
- Sara Kestelman as Group Captain Susan Preston
- Paul Medford as Nick Shay (as Paul J. Medford)
- Jonathan Dow as Flight Lieutenant Jim Radcliffe
- Gerard Rooney as Sergeant Tuffley
- Christopher Fairbank as Wing Commander Friday (as Chris Fairbank)
- Nicola Buckingham as Echo
- Diana Payan as Gran
- Laura Harling as Emily Tucker
- Bob Barrett as Flight Lieutenant Stewart

== In other media ==
=== VHS ===
Invasion: Earth – Volume 1: Chapters 1–3 (The Last War/The Fourth Dimension/Only the Dead)
and
Invasion: Earth – Volume 2: Chapters 4–6 (The Fall of Man/The Battle More Costly/The Shatterer of Worlds)

Label: BMG Video
Release Date: 1998
Catalogue №: 74321 576 823 (Volume 1), 74321 576833 (Volume 2)
Availability: Deleted

Each tape also includes part of a two-part behind-the-scenes documentary called The Making of Invasion: Earth.

=== DVD ===
Invasion: Earth (2-disc Region 1 box set)

Label: A&E Television Networks
Release Date: 2005
Catalogue №: AAE-71413 (Disc 1: AAE-71414, Disc 2: AAE-71415)
Availability: Out now

DVD Features

- Production Notes
- History of Alien Invasion Films
- Cast Biographies

To date, Invasion: Earth has only been released on Region 1 DVD in the United States, and as far as is known there are currently no plans for a Region 2 release for the UK.

=== Tie-in publication ===
The Invasion: Earth Companion

Publisher: Headline Book Publishing
Year: 1998
Author: Peter Haining
Original Price: £9.99
ISBN №: 0-7472-7622-6
Availability: Out of print

A fully illustrated guide to Invasion: Earth, which includes a detailed look at the speculative science behind the fiction and exclusive interviews with the cast and crew. The book is no longer in print.
