= Comedy Premieres =

1997 series of television comedies

Comedy Premieres is a programming strand of four one-off television comedies, produced by Granada Television for the ITV network and broadcast throughout 1997.

== Premieres ==
Title	Directed by	Written by	Original release date
Cold Feet	Declan Lowney	Mike Bullen	30 March 1997
A serial philanderer (played by James Nesbitt) finally finds the woman of his dreams (played by Helen Baxendale), but the relationship breaks down when he gets cold feet. Spun off into Cold Feet in 1998.
The Chest	Suri Krishnamma	Peter Morgan	12 April 1997
A failed businessman (played by Neil Morrissey) hopes to clear his massive debts after finding a treasure map. He discovers that the location of the treasure has had a housing estate built on top of it. A rival (played by Jim Carter) tries to claim the treasure for himself.
The Grimleys	Declan Lowney	Jed Mercurio	5 July 1997
A schoolboy (played by James Bradshaw) falls in love with his English teacher (played by Samantha Janus) but has a love rival in the shape of his sadistic PE teacher (played by Jack Dee). Spun off into The Grimleys in 1999.
King Leek	Sam Miller	Billy Ivory	30 December 1997
Malcolm Cromer (played by Tim Healy) is so confident that his leeks will win a local competition that he bets the family home on it. His wife (played by Su Elliot) tries to sabotage the leeks by urinating on them, but this has the opposite effect of improving their growth.

== Production ==
The Premieres, all pilots for potential television series, were produced from 1995 to 1996 for intended broadcast in 1996. However, they were all postponed until 1997.

== Reception ==
Cold Feet received positive critical reaction from The Times; in The Times, Matthew Bond wrote that it is "an enjoyable one-off comedy aimed at anybody who's ever been single, married, or had children. With such catholic appeal further heightened by Helen Baxendale heading a talented cast, it showed just what ITV can do." An ITV committee selected Cold Feet to represent the network in the comedy-drama category at the Montreux Television Festival. The programme won the Silver Rose in the Humour category and the Golden Rose of Montreux, the festival's highest honour. Further acclaim came at the end of the year at the British Comedy Awards when Cold Feet won the Best Comedy Drama (ITV) award.

Alexander Chancellor previewed The Chest for The Observer, calling it "homely" and concluded that "If you don't mind implausible plots and inconclusive endings, you may find this quite enjoyable to watch; but don't expect to laugh very much." In The Independent, Tina Ogle noted that Neil Morrissey was playing a "typical fluffy bunny", but singled out Jim Carter as the best actor. Thomas Sutcliffe for the same newspaper was more critical of Morrissey, writing that he was putting on "his 10-year-old boy act", and concluded by saying The Chest "makes you want to run someone through with a cutlass." Matthew Bond criticised the story for being "a familiar variation of a familiar story" but complimented the main cast for holding it together.

The Grimleys received acclaim for its 1970s nostalgia. Mark Lawson called it "a rare example of a period sitcom" and compared Darren Grimley to Adrian Mole. John Millar for the Daily Record anticipated a full series would follow the pilot and Eddie Gibb for The Scotsman named it the best sitcom of the year. The broadcast was watched by 4.6 million, gaining a 42% audience share.

King Leek was described in The People as having "sheer comic class". The reviewer praised both the leads and the supporting cast and concluded by calling it the best of the four comedy premieres. Matthew Bond wrote that Billy Ivory had written "something so black that it was nigh on impossible to see the comedy at all." Desmond Christy of The Guardian was equally disappointed and hoped a series would not follow the pilot.

The Grimleys and Cold Feet were each commissioned for full series. The Grimleys ran for three series from 1999 to 2001, and Cold Feet ran for five series from 1998 to 2003 and, after a thirteen-year hiatus, for four more series from 2016 to 2020.
