= List of awards and nominations received by Steven Knight =

Steven Knight awards and nominations
Awards and nominations
Award	Wins	Nominations
Academy Awards	0	1
BAFTA Awards	0	2

The following is a list of awards and nominations received by English screenwriter and film director Steven Knight.

== Major associations ==
=== Academy Awards ===
Year	Category	Nominated work	Result	Ref.
2004	Best Original Screenplay	Dirty Pretty Things	Nominated	

=== British Academy Film Awards ===
Year	Category	Nominated work	Result	Ref.
2003	Best Original Screenplay	Dirty Pretty Things	Nominated	
2008	Outstanding British Film	Eastern Promises	Nominated	

== Other associations ==
=== British Independent Film Awards ===
Year	Category	Nominated work	Result	Ref.
2003	Best Screenplay	Dirty Pretty Things	Won	
2007	Best Screenplay	Eastern Promises	Nominated	
2013	Best Screenplay	Locke	Won	

=== British Screenwriters’ Awards ===
Year	Category	Nominated work	Result	Ref.
2014	Best British Feature Film Writing	Locke	Nominated	
2015	Best British Crime Writing	Peaky Blinders	Nominated	
2016	Best British TV Drama Writing	Peaky Blinders	Won	

=== Chlotrudis Awards ===
Year	Category	Nominated work	Result	Ref.
2015	Best Original Screenplay	Locke	Nominated	

=== Christopher Award ===
Year	Category	Nominated work	Result	Ref.
2008	Feature Films	Amazing Grace	Won	

=== David di Donatello Awards ===
Year	Category	Nominated work	Result	Ref.
2015	Best European Film	Locke	Nominated	

=== Edgar Award ===
Year	Category	Nominated work	Result	Ref.
2004	Best Motion Picture Screenplay	Dirty Pretty Things	Won	
2008	Best Motion Picture Screen Play	Eastern Promises	Nominated	

=== European Film Awards ===
Year	Category	Nominated work	Result	Ref.
2003	European Screenwriter	Dirty Pretty Things	Nominated	
2014	European Director	Locke	Nominated	
2014	European Screenwriter	Locke	Nominated	

=== Evening Standard British Film Awards ===
Year	Category	Nominated work	Result	Ref.
2008	Best Screenplay	Amazing Grace	Nominated	
2008	Best Screenplay	Eastern Promises	Nominated	

=== Genie Awards ===
Year	Category	Nominated work	Result	Ref.
2008	Best Original Screenplay	Eastern Promises	Won	

=== Gothenburg Film Festival ===
Year	Category	Nominated work	Result	Ref.
2014	International Debut Award	Locke	Nominated	

=== Humanitas Prize ===
Year	Category	Nominated work	Result	Ref.
2004	Feature Film Category	Dirty Pretty Things	Won	
2007	Feature Film Category	Amazing Grace	Nominated	

=== International Online Cinema Awards ===
Year	Category	Nominated work	Result	Ref.
2008	Best Original Screenplay	Eastern Promises	Nominated	

=== Italian Online Movie Awards ===
Year	Category	Nominated work	Result	Ref.
2008	Best Original Screenplay (Miglior sceneggiatura originale)	Eastern Promises	Nominated	

=== London Film Critics' Circle ===
Year	Category	Nominated work	Result	Ref.
2003	British Screenwriter of the Year	Dirty Pretty Things	Won	

=== Los Angeles Film Critics Association ===
Year	Category	Nominated work	Result	Ref.
2004	Best Screenplay	Dirty Pretty Things	Nominated	

=== New York Film Critics Circle ===
Year	Category	Nominated work	Result	Ref.
2003	Best Screenplay	Dirty Pretty Things	Nominated	

=== Online Film & Television Association ===
Year	Category	Nominated work	Result	Ref.
2008	Best Writing, Screenplay Written Directly for the Screen	Eastern Promises	Nominated	

=== Online Film Critics Society ===
Year	Category	Nominated work	Result	Ref.
2008	Best Original Screenplay	Eastern Promises	Nominated	

=== Royal Television Society ===
Year	Category	Nominated work	Result	Ref.
2014	Best Drama Series	Peaky Blinders	Won	
2014	Judges' Award	Peaky Blinders	Won	

=== San Diego Film Critics Society ===
Year	Category	Nominated work	Result	Ref.
2014	Best Original Screenplay	Locke	Nominated	

=== Sarasota Film Festival ===
Year	Category	Nominated work	Result	Ref.
2014	Narrative Feature Competition Winner	Locke	Nominated	

=== Satellite Awards ===
Year	Category	Nominated work	Result	Ref.
2007	Best Original Screenplay	Eastern Promises	Nominated	

=== St. Louis Film Critics Association ===
Year	Category	Nominated work	Result	Ref.
2014	Best Original Screenplay	Locke	Nominated	

=== Sydney Film Festival ===
Year	Category	Nominated work	Result	Ref.
2014	Best Film	Locke	Nominated	

=== Washington D.C. Area Film Critics Association ===
Year	Category	Nominated work	Result	Ref.
2003	Best Original Screenplay	Dirty Pretty Things	Nominated	

=== Writers Guild of America ===
Year	Category	Nominated work	Result	Ref.
2004	Best Original Screenplay	Dirty Pretty Things	Nominated	

=== Writers' Guild of Great Britain ===
Year	Category	Nominated work	Result	Ref.
1994	TV - Light Entertainment	Canned Carrott	Won	
2014	Best Long Form TV Drama	Peaky Blinders	Nominated	
2018	Best Long Form TV Drama	Taboo	Won	
