= Line of Duty series 4 =

2017 series of Line of Duty

Line of Duty
- Series 4
- United Kingdom DVD cover art
- Showrunner: Jed Mercurio
- Starring: Thandie Newton; Martin Compston; Vicky McClure; Adrian Dunbar; Jason Watkins
- No. of episodes: 6

Release
- Original network: BBC One
- Original release: 26 March – 30 April 2017

Series chronology
- ← Previous; Series 3 Next → Series 5

The fourth series of the British police procedural television programme Line of Duty was broadcast on BBC One between 26 March and 30 April 2017. It is the first series to air on the network after the first three were broadcast on BBC Two.

The series follows the fictional Anti-Corruption Unit 12. AC-12 is led by Superintendent Ted Hastings (Adrian Dunbar), who is assisted by his team of DS Steve Arnott (Martin Compston) and DS Kate Fleming (Vicky McClure). They are also aided by PC Maneet Bindra (Maya Sondhi) as well as DC Jamie Desford (Royce Pierreson), who is briefly assigned to the team. The unit investigates DCI Roz Huntley (Thandie Newton); she is suspected of arresting the wrong person after ignoring forensic evidence presented by Forensic Coordinator Tim Ifield (Jason Watkins). Over the course of the investigation she implicates her husband Nick (Lee Ingleby) and his lawyer Jimmy Lakewell (Patrick Baladi). Supporting characters include ACC Derek Hilton (Paul Higgins) and DS Sam Railston (Aiysha Hart).

The series was commissioned along with the third after the success of the second. Line of Duty was created by Jed Mercurio, who executive produces the series alongside Simon Heath and Stephen Wright. Cait Collins produced it. Filming took place in late 2016 with Mercurio directing two episodes and John Strickland directing four. Anna Valdez Hanks and Stephen Murphy provided cinematography. The series was nominated for 21 awards, six of which were won. It also received significantly higher viewing figures than previous series and mostly positive reviews from critics, leading to the commissioning of series six. The fifth series returned to BBC One in 2019.

== Cast and characters ==
=== Main ===
- Thandie Newton as DCI Roseanne "Roz" Huntley
- Martin Compston as DS Steve Arnott
- Vicky McClure as DS Kate Fleming
- Adrian Dunbar as Superintendent Ted Hastings
- Jason Watkins as FC Tim Ifield (Note: Watkins is credited with the main cast in episodes 1–2 and as a guest star in episode five)

=== Starring ===
- Paul Higgins as ACC Derek Hilton
- Aiysha Hart as DS Sam Railston
- Maya Sondhi as PC Maneet Bindra
- Lee Ingleby as Nick Huntley
- Patrick Baladi as Jimmy Lakewell

=== Recurring ===
- Gaite Jansen as Hana Reznikova
- Claudia Jessie as DC Jodie Taylor
- Patrick FitzSymons as DCI Mark Moffatt
- Mark Stobbart as DS Neil Twyler
- Scott Reid as Michael Farmer
- Anneika Rose as PC Farida Jatri
- Elva Trill as Gemma Riley
- Royce Pierreson as DC Jamie Desford
- Vineeta Rishi as FC Rupal Pandit
- Nigel Boyle as DCI Ian Buckells

=== Guest ===
- Harriet Cains as Jade Hopkirk
- Craig Parkinson as DI Matthew "Dot" Cottan
- Tony Pitts as DCS Lester Hargreaves

== Episodes ==
Line of Duty series 4 episodes
No. overall	No. in series	Title	Directed by	Written by	Original release date	UK viewers (millions)
18	1	"Episode 1" "In the Shadow of Truth"	Jed Mercurio	Jed Mercurio	26 March 2017	7.40
After saving Hana Reznikova from being murdered, DCI Roseanne "Roz" Huntley captures a suspected serial killer known as 'Balaclava Man'. The suspect is uncooperative under questioning and doesn't have an alibi. ACC Derek Hilton pressures Huntley to charge the suspect. FC Tim Ifield informs Huntley of discrepancies that could prove the suspect's innocence, but Huntley seems uninterested. Ifield alerts AC-12 to a possible miscarriage of justice. He tells DS Steve Arnott that he believes Huntley is deliberately ignoring forensic evidence and that forensics suggest someone has attempted to frame the suspect. Superintendent Ted Hastings authorises DS Kate Fleming to go undercover and investigate Huntley. Ifield visits Reznikova at a cafe and arranges for her to clean his flat. Huntley suspects Ifield of talking to AC-12 and turns up at his flat. Ifield admits this, and a row breaks out over the guilt of the suspect. Huntley causes Ifield to burn his hand and he slaps her. When she accuses him of assault, he pushes Huntley who hits her head, appearing fatal. Ifield departs to a hardware store, purchasing cutting tools in order to dispose of the body. While he's preparing to carve Huntley's body, she wakes up.
19	2	"Episode 2" "Who Sows the Wind"	Jed Mercurio	Jed Mercurio	2 April 2017	7.26
Michael Farmer, the alleged serial killer, remembers he was in the hospital when Leonie Collersdale, the second murder victim, was killed. This casts further doubt on his guilt. A dismembered female body is discovered and identified as Collersdale's. AC-12 interviews Huntley and questions the forensic evidence concerning the attack on Reznikova. When Ifield goes missing, Arnott goes to his flat and finds his body with three fingers having been amputated. Huntley arrives and takes charge of the crime scene, despite Arnott's protests. Inside, she notices blood spatter, which she believes to be hers. Huntley obtains a sample of Ifield's blood and replaces the collected evidence. Communications with Reznikova are found in Ifield's mobile phone records. Arnott learns from forensics that Ifield was wearing a forensic oversuit at the time of death and concludes that Huntley is Ifield's killer. Huntley takes a further sample of Ifield's blood and inserts it into evidence for Collersdale's murder. Fleming passes the Inspector's exam, but Hastings indicates that Arnott has seniority for promotion first. Huntley tells Hilton that evidence against Ifield undermines any evidence he gave AC-12 about her. She tells him she's convinced Ifield's murder and Farmer's crimes are connected.
20	3	"Episode 3" "In the Trap"	John Strickland	Jed Mercurio	9 April 2017	7.37
Huntley continually shuts Fleming out of meetings as the officers try to find links between Ifield and Farmer. In order to gain access to information from the investigation, AC-12 seize evidence forcibly. A security camera shot of Ifield purchasing the cutting tools in a balaclava is found at his flat but does not convince Arnott that Ifield is 'Balaclava Man'. Arnott theorises Huntley was the one to kill Ifield after her phone history proves suspicious. DC Jodie Taylor notices Fleming checking the forensics and reports back to Huntley. Reznikova is discovered to be a prostitute and admits to having slept with Ifield. Arnott begins questioning Huntley's husband, Nick Huntley, regarding her whereabouts on the night Ifield died. DC Jamie Desford is assigned to assist Arnott with the investigation. Having heard no response from Nick, Arnott returns to Nick's office to question him and misses messages from AC-12 warning him Nick may be dangerous, as his car was identified both approaching and departing from the area near Ifield's flat on the night of his murder. Once arrived, Arnott is attacked by a man in a balaclava and thrown down three flights of stairs.
21	4	"Episode 4" "Moral Superiority"	John Strickland	Jed Mercurio	16 April 2017	8.48
After the attack on Arnott, he is found to be badly injured, but alive. Nick is interviewed and denies attacking Arnott. He did not explain why his car was seen near Ifield's flat when Ifield was murdered. Nick's solicitor, Jimmy Lakewell, gets Nick released from custody. AC-12 find footage of a man in a balaclava around the time of Arnott's attack. Nick reveals to Huntley that he followed her on the night of Ifield's murder and witnessed her visit Ifield's flat. Huntley asks Hilton to help her make an official complaint against AC-12. Huntley's wrist injury is now worse; she has it examined by a doctor who takes a blood sample. AC-12 finds an anomaly in the second forensic examination of the blood-spatter from Ifield's flat: traces of fibres from a forensic oversuit. Huntley is interviewed by AC-12, and Hastings says he will recommend she be suspended from duty. Huntley then accuses Hastings of sexism and identifies Fleming as an undercover officer. Huntley brandishes a supporting letter from Hilton, recusing AC-12 from their inquiry. Hilton and Huntley meet again at his club, but Huntley rejects his sexual advances. Afterwards, PC Maneet Bindra gives a file to Hilton.
22	5	"Episode 5" "Lying Nest"	John Strickland	Jed Mercurio	23 April 2017	9.03
Hilton demands a copy of DI Matthew "Dot" Cottan's dying declaration, but Hastings refuses to provide it. Biometrics suggest the 'Balaclava Man' who attacked Arnott and the one seen in the area of Collersdale's murder are the same man, which would exonerate Farmer. More body parts of Collersdale's are discovered. Bindra uses Desford's password to access Cottan's dying declaration for Hilton. Hastings reprimands Desford who claims he is being scapegoated and requests a transfer. Believing the framing of Farmer could not have been random, Arnott finds that Farmer's former solicitor was Lakewell. Forensics reveal that Collersdale's latest remains had been frozen and were buried after Ifield's murder, further exonerating Farmer. Arnott recalls that the body of Jackie Laverty was buried after being kept in deep freeze, and men in balaclava masks were involved. He believes the two cases to be connected. Huntley faints and has her hand amputated due to MRSA. Huntley frames Nick for Ifield's murder and has him arrested. Hilton plays Hastings the recording of Cottan's dying declaration in which it is revealed that the corrupt official who promoted Cottan had a name beginning with 'H'. Hilton accuses Hastings of being 'H'.
23	6	"Episode 6" "Royal Hunting Ground"	John Strickland	Jed Mercurio	30 April 2017	9.92
Believing Huntley framed Nick, AC-12 narrow their search to a three-hour window before Ifield's body was discovered. Arnott works out that Huntley would only have had minutes to hide any evidence. They search a woodland area Huntley was seen driving towards and find incriminating evidence. It is also discovered the MRSA that infected Huntley is traceable to Ifield. Huntley is arrested for Ifield's murder. She admits to killing Ifield in self-defence and to framing Nick. Huntley then accuses Lakewell of perverting the course of justice. It is revealed that Lakewell used a burner phone to tip off Hilton, who then contacted the man who attacked Arnott. The same phone was used by the man who kidnapped Reznikova and planted evidence in Farmer's house. Huntley proves Hilton's involvement through a private number he gave her. Desford attempts to take Lakewell on Hilton's orders, but Arnott and Huntley stop him. Hilton is found dead the next day at the same location as a murder relating to Sands View boys' home. Huntley is sentenced to ten years for Ifield's manslaughter and subsequent cover-up. Lakewell pleaded guilty. Nick and Farmer are released without charge. The 'H' accusation against Hastings is dropped.

== Production ==
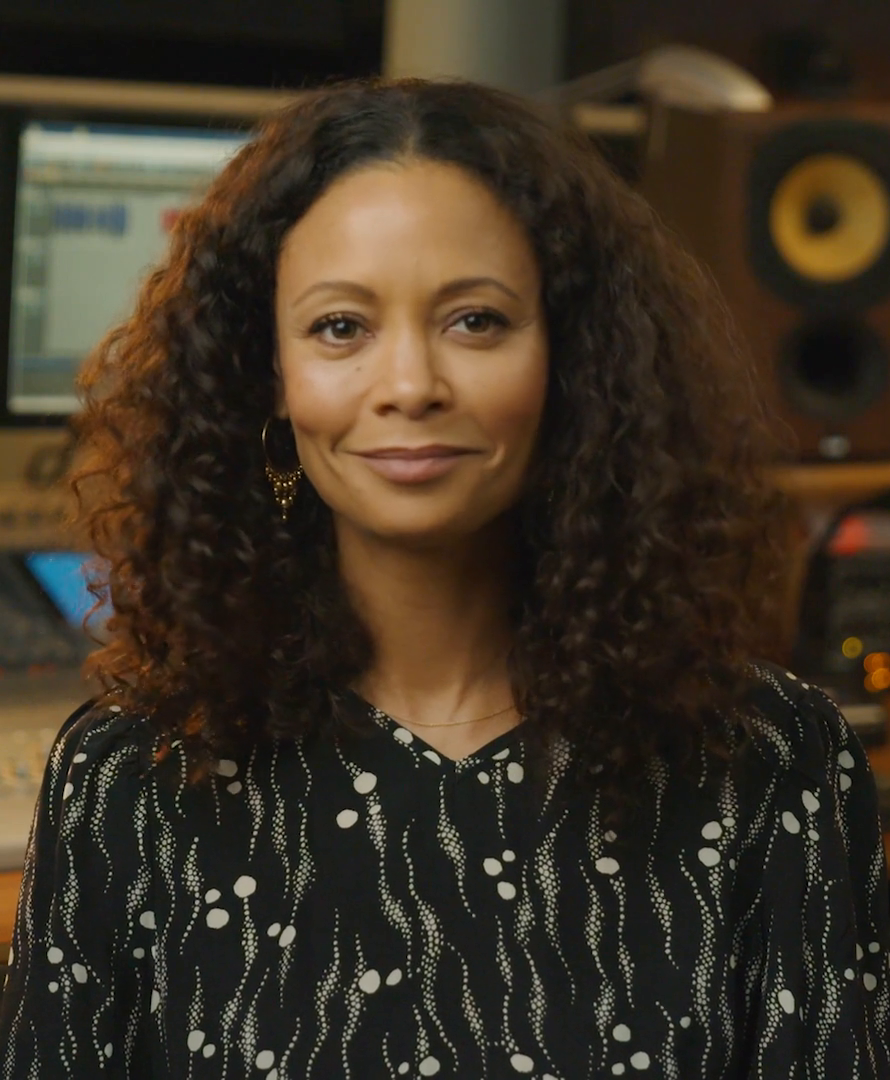
Thandie Newton starred in the series as DCI Roz Huntley

On 8 April 2014, the BBC confirmed that Line of Duty would return for a third and fourth series. Following the success of the third series, a fifth was commissioned, at which time it was reported that future editions of the programme would move from BBC Two to BBC One. Although BBC One originally passed on the series when creator Jed Mercurio pitched it to the network, the decision to move the show came after high viewing figures and a restructuring of the networks. Mercurio wrote the series and executive produced it alongside Simon Heath for World Productions and Stephen Wright for Northern Ireland Screen. The fourth series was produced by Cait Collins.

Actors Martin Compston, Vicky McClure, and Adrian Dunbar returned to the series. Thandie Newton joined the series as Detective Chief Inspector Roz Huntley, the latest police officer to be investigated by AC-12. Additionally, Jason Watkins was cast to portray Forensic Coordinator Tim Ifield. Aiysha Hart, Maya Sondhi, Lee Ingleby, Patrick Baladi, Royce Pierreson, and Tony Pitts also appear. Despite being killed off in the previous series, Craig Parkinson filmed new footage of his character's dying declaration.

Mercurio directed the first two episodes of the series while John Strickland returned to direct the final four episodes. Anna Valdez Hanks served as the cinematographer for episodes 1–3, and Stephen Murphy took over for the remaining three episodes. Filming on the series occurred in Belfast from 29 August to 16 December 2016. It consisted of six hour-long episodes. Five days after broadcast transmission concluded, Line of Duty was commissioned for a sixth series.

== Release ==
=== Broadcast and streaming ===
The series was first broadcast in the United Kingdom on BBC One from 26 March 2017 and concluded six weeks later on 30 April. In the United States, it was added to Hulu on 1 May 2017. It can also be streamed there on Acorn TV and BritBox. In Canada and Australia the series streams on Netflix.

=== Home media ===
Line of Duty series 4 home media releases
Name	DVD release dates		Number of episodes	Number of discs
Name	Region 1	Region 2	Number of episodes	Number of discs
Line of Duty - Series 4	26 September 2017	8 May 2017	6	2
Line of Duty - Series 1-4	—N/a	8 May 2017	23	8
Line of Duty - Series 1-5 (Note: Titled Line of Duty: Series 1-5 Collection in region one)	26 November 2019	6 May 2019	29	10 (Note: 5 discs in region one)
Line of Duty - Series 1-6 Complete Box Set	—N/a	31 May 2021	36	12

== Reception ==
=== Viewing figures ===
No.	Title	Air date	Overnight ratings	Consolidated ratings		Total viewers (millions)	28-day viewers (millions)	28-day rank	Ref(s)
No.	Title	Air date	Viewers (millions)	Viewers (millions)	Rank	Total viewers (millions)	28-day viewers (millions)	28-day rank	Ref(s)
1	Episode 1	26 March 2017	5.00	2.40	2	7.40	9.21	1	
2	Episode 2	2 April 2017	—N/a	—N/a	1	7.26	9.04	1	
3	Episode 3	9 April 2017	4.50	2.87	1	7.37	9.05	1	
4	Episode 4	16 April 2017	5.70	2.78	1	8.48	9.60	1	
5	Episode 5	23 April 2017	6.60	2.43	1	9.03	9.98	1	
6	Episode 6	30 April 2017	7.50	2.42	1	9.92	10.40	1	

=== Critical response ===
On the review aggregator website Rotten Tomatoes, 100% of 16 critics' reviews are positive, with an average rating of 8/10. Den of Geek's Louisa Mellor commended the amount of action in the series-opening episode stating that there was a "car accident, an abduction, an escape attempt, a police chase, a firebomb explosion and a rescue" all before the opening credits. Sam Wollaston, writing for The Guardian, considered the action to be over-the-top and suggested there were plot holes writing that "Perhaps that's what happens when writer and director are the same person. There is no one around to say: hang on a minute, are you sure?" Rachel Cooke of The New Statesman wrote that the second episode was "as well built as any in the last series" but feared that Line of Duty would become a "pastiche of itself" as Mercurio attempted to top himself.

Once the series concluded, Sarah Hughes, also with The Guardian, said she enjoyed the fulfilling end to the series and noted how it addressed real-world problems by saying "Tim Ifield and Huntley were victims of their own knowledge in that, as experienced police officers, both believed a plea of self-defence wouldn't save them and chose instead to try and cover up their crimes." Newton's character was, however, praised by critics who noted the complexity of Huntley's actions and the motivations behind them. The Irish Independent writer John Boland opined that the series "came to a nail-bitingly exciting end, or rather to three nail-bitingly exciting ends, two of them unforeseeable by even the most imaginative of viewers." The Guardian ranked the series number two on their "50 best TV shows of 2017" list. Digital Spy, however, considered the fourth series to be the worst out of the programme's six.

=== Accolades ===
Year	Award	Category	Nominee(s)	Result	Ref(s).
2017	British Screenwriters' Awards	Best Crime Writing on Television (Series/Single Drama)	Jed Mercurio	Won	
2017	Diversity in Media Awards	TV Moment of the Year	"DCI Roz Huntley Interview"	Nominated	
2017	Royal Television Society Northern Ireland Awards	Best Drama	Line of Duty	Won	
2017	Royal Television Society Northern Ireland Awards	Original Music Score	Carly Paradis	Nominated	
2018	Association of Motion Picture Sound Awards	Excellence in Sound for a Television Drama	Bea O'Sullivan, Paul Maynes, Ian Wilkinson, and Pietro Dalmasso	Nominated	
2018	British Academy Television Awards	Best Drama Series	Line of Duty	Nominated	
2018	British Academy Television Awards	Best Leading Actress	Thandie Newton	Nominated	
2018	British Academy Television Awards	Best Supporting Actor	Adrian Dunbar	Nominated	
2018	British Academy Television Awards	Virgin TV's Must-See Moment	"Huntley's Narrow Escape"	Nominated	
2018	British Academy Television Craft Awards	Best Editing: Fiction	Andrew John McClelland for "Episode 4"	Nominated	
2018	Broadcasting Press Guild Awards	Best Drama Series	Line of Duty	Won	
2018	Broadcasting Press Guild Awards	Best Actress	Thandie Newton	Nominated	
2018	Broadcasting Press Guild Awards	Best Writer	Jed Mercurio	Won	
2018	Edinburgh TV Awards	Best UK Drama	Line of Duty	Nominated	
2018	Irish Film & Television Awards	Best Drama	Line of Duty	Nominated	
2018	Irish Film & Television Awards	Best Actor in a Leading Role	Adrian Dunbar	Nominated	
2018	National Television Awards	Best Crime Drama	Line of Duty	Nominated	
2018	Royal Television Society Programme Awards	Best Actress	Thandie Newton	Nominated	
2018	South Bank Sky Arts Award	TV Drama	Line of Duty	Nominated	
2018	Televisual Bulldog Awards	Best Drama Series	Line of Duty	Won	
2018	Televisual Bulldog Awards	Best Writer	Jed Mercurio	Won	
2018	Writers' Guild of Great Britain Awards	Best Long Form TV Drama	Jed Mercurio	Nominated	
