= The Grimleys =

British TV comedy-drama series (1999–2001)

- Genre: Comedy drama
- Created by: Jed Mercurio
- Starring: Nigel Planer; James Bradshaw
- Country of origin: United Kingdom
- Original language: English
- No. of series: 3
- No. of episodes: 22

Production
- Running time: 30 minutes & 1x 45 minute Special
- Production company: Granada Television

Original release
- Network: ITV
- Release: 5 July 1997 – 1 April 2001

The Grimleys is a comedy-drama television series set on a council estate in Dudley, West Midlands, England in the mid-1970s. It was first broadcast by Granada TV for ITV in 1999, following a pilot in 1997, and concluded in 2001 after three series.

The show was written by Jed Mercurio, who had trained as a doctor and whose first series, Cardiac Arrest – written under the pseudonym 'John MacUre' – had attracted critical plaudits for its dark portrayal of life in a disintegrating British National Health Service.

The filming of the school took place in Salford, Buile Hill High, Hope High, and Pendleton College, and the characters' homes were filmed on Gatesgarth Road in Langley, Greater Manchester. Later series featured location filming in Dudley, including a scene at Dudley Zoo.

== Premise ==
The Grimleys follows the ups and downs of the dysfunctional Grimley family in their struggles with everyday life. Gordon Grimley (James Bradshaw) is an intellectual but feeble schoolboy who has a crush on his teacher, Miss Geraldine Titley (Amanda Holden; Samantha Janus in the pilot). His younger brother Darren (Ryan Cartwright), who also narrates the storyline and sets the scene, is fond of Gordon and sympathetic to his unrequited love for Miss Titley, but is frustrated by his brother's fey personality and his nickname, "The School Spanner". Their father Baz (Nigel Planer) is a bone-idle British Leyland car worker, who injured his back on his first day at the Longbridge plant and went on strike on the second. He has not moved from his armchair since then and spends his days watching television. He is particularly infuriated by Gordon's artistic leanings and is determined that he should do "a man's job" rather than go to university, unlike their hard-working mother Janet (Jan Ravens).

Other domestic characters are their older sister Lisa Grimley (Corrieann Fletcher) and their Nan (Barbara Keogh), who seems to be obsessed with the "Grimley curse". The Grimleys' next-door neighbours are the Titleys, consisting of Geraldine, plumber uncle Reg (Paul Angelis) and his son Shane (Simon Lowe), a Bay City Roller lookalike and self-styled ladies' man with a clapped-out Vauxhall Viva car.

To complicate matters further, Shane is dating Lisa, and Janet and Reg carry obvious torches for each other. Reg's sensitivity and surprisingly poetic tongue give rise to a question mark over Gordon Grimley's parentage, as does Shane Titley's oafish behaviour and idolisation of Baz Grimley.

Many of the scenes are set in the Grimley brothers' school, alongside their sadistic PE teacher Doug "Dynamo" Digby (Brian Conley; Jack Dee in the pilot), who lives in a corner of the school gymnasium. Doug always takes both pride and pleasure in bullying his pupils, perhaps due to the behaviour of his thuggish father (Lewis Collins). Doug is dating Geraldine Titley, much to Gordon Grimley's chagrin, leading to increasing tensions between them. Also present is Amazonian gym mistress Miss Thing (Ruby Snape), whom Digby seems to fancy.

The show also stars Noddy Holder, the former lead singer of Slade, in the role of music teacher Neville Holder (his own real name), and there are a number of cameos including one by the glam rock singer Alvin Stardust as a pub landlord. This leads to a series of in jokes, such as Holder and Stardust bemoaning the lost opportunities of their youth over a pint of beer, and Holder's character being described as "not exactly Mr Rock 'n' Roll".

Other guest stars were Bamber Gascoigne as the school's headmaster; Johnny Ball as a maths teacher in another school; Michael Cronin as "Bullet" Baxter (the role that he had played in Grange Hill); William Woollard as science teacher Mr Woollard; Elizabeth Berrington as a school inspector; Ron Atkinson as the manager of an opposing football team; Stephen Lewis playing a coach driver very similar to his character Inspector Blake in On the Buses; Jim Bowen as a militant trade unionist; and Pam Ayres as herself.

== Series 3 changes and conclusion ==
Series one and two features the same regular cast and runs in a continuous time frame, while series three is set later in the 1970s. Doug Digby's character is killed off in a gym accident in the first episode of the third series, and he is replaced in Geraldine Titley's affections by the scheming, manipulative woodwork teacher Dave Trebilcock (pronounced "Trebilco"), played by Craig Kelly. Geraldine has spent the time between the second and third series in a coma, which allows the series to shift its focus from the glam rock era to the punk era.

Gordon is now working as a trainee teacher at the school, where he is bullied and insulted by the pupils, many of whom, including his brother, Darren, are dressed as punks. Gordon and Darren enter a poem competition hosted by Pam Ayres, Darren wins with his poem called "Urban Jungle Boy", being told he is off to London to make the big time, however learning of Geraldine's departure to London, Darren gives the opportunity to Gordon. Gordon knowing of Geraldine's intentions goes to London to join her, meanwhile Geraldine discovers she is pregnant and decides to stay, Gordon ends up on TV and gets spotted by a talent scout, this leads Gordon to become an overnight star and is adored by screaming girls.

Their mother Jan, meanwhile, is now seeing Neville Holder, who now is headmaster of the school, this leads to her walking out on Baz, who on her departure confirms he believes Gordon is a Titley as she denies this and leaves, Geraldine is about to marry Dave Trebilcock, however she jilts Dave, running from the church into Gordon's arms, whilst the viewer is left wondering if the "Grimley Curse" will strike their happy union.

== Cast ==
- Nigel Planer as Barry "Baz" Grimley
- James Bradshaw as Gordon Grimley
- Samantha Janus as Geraldine Titley (pilot episode only)
- Amanda Holden as Geraldine Titley (from Series 1)
- Ryan Cartwright as Darren Grimley
- Jan Ravens as Janet Grimley
- Alex Leam as Jacob Grimley (pilot episode only)
- Corrieann Fletcher as Lisa Grimley (series 1 and 2)
- Barbara Keogh as Nan Grimley (series 1 and 2)
- Paul Angelis as Reg Titley (series 1 and 2)
- Woody Clements as Shane Titley (pilot only)
- Simon Lowe as Shane Titley (series 1 and 2)
- Jack Dee as Doug "Dynamo" Digby (pilot episode only)
- Brian Conley as Doug "Dynamo" Digby (series 1-3 Episode 1)
- Ruby Snape as Miss Thing
- Noddy Holder as Neville Holder
- Craig Kelly as Dave Trebilcock (series 3)
- Cameos:
  - Bamber Gascoigne as school headmaster
  - Johnny Ball as a teacher in the 'genius' school
  - Michael Cronin as Bullet Baxter
  - Jim Bowen as a militant trade union rep
  - Stephen Lewis as a coach driver
  - Pam Ayres as hostess and judge of a poetry competition
  - Elizabeth Berrington as a school inspector assessing Gordon's teaching-ability
  - Alvin Stardust as a pub landlord
  - Lewis Collins as Father Digby
  - Members of UFX (series 3 episode 5):
    - Ratfink as Gordon Bates
    - Johnny Volume as punk DJ
    - Dunk Rock and Chad Spandosa as Bates' gang
  - Tony Blackburn as man in pub (series 2, episode 8)
  - Patrick Mower as 'the million pound man' (series 2, episode 7)
  - Bobby Ball as President of Earth
  - William Woollard as the science teacher

== Logos ==
The pilot episode, shown in 1997, features a Grimleys logo on the opening titles that is never seen otherwise. Series one and two (as well as on the respective VHS releases and first soundtrack album) feature a green Grimleys logo showing the letters of "Grimleys" in platform shoes, with a lava lamp taking the place of the "I". A yellow silhouette of this logo made its way onto the cover of the VHS release of the pilot episode.

Series three was given a new logo to go with its late 1970s punk concept. The new logo of The Grimleys featured the letters of the words in red on individual pieces of white paper, highly remisicent of (and most likely inspired by) how the words "Swindle" appear on the cover of The Great Rock 'n' Roll Swindle (an album of the Sex Pistols).

== Music ==
The theme music of the first series is "Bye Bye Baby" by the Bay City Rollers over the title credits and either "Mama Weer All Crazee Now" or "Cum On Feel the Noize", both by Slade, over the end credits. Noddy Holder performs an acoustic version of "Cum On Feel the Noize" over the end credits of the episode "The Road Not Taken".

In the second series the end title credits vary between "Cum On Feel the Noize", "How Does It Feel?" and "Everyday", also by Slade. Holder performs an alternative Easter version of "Merry Xmas Everybody" during the episode "???", mimes "How Does It Feel?" on a piano in the episode "The Bionic Boy" and performs an acoustic version of "'Coz I Luv You" over the end credits of the Series 2 finale, "The Prime of Mr Doug Digby".

In the Series 3 finale , Holder performs an acoustic version of Everyday (Slade song) as he serenades Jan Grimley, this ends with them kissing for the first time, this was the original ending to what would have been a two part finale.

"Ever Fallen in Love (With Someone You Shouldn't've)" by the Buzzcocks is the theme music of the third series, which also features the song "Jilted John" by Jilted John (Graham Fellows) with its refrain "Gordon is a moron" for a punk disco scene in which the members of the Blackpool punk band UFX appear opposite Amanda Holden.

== Episodes ==
Series	Episodes	Originally released	
Series	Episodes	First released	Last released
0	1	5 July 1997	
1	6	8 March 1999	20 April 1999
2	10	9 January 2000	12 March 2000
3	6	22 January 2001	1 April 2001

=== Pilot (1997) ===
The pilot originally aired as the fourth installment of Comedy Premieres on 5 July 1997. The show was repeated on ITV2 and ITV3 for a few years after its original transmission and has not been repeated since.

Title	Original release date
"The Grimleys"	5 July 1997

=== Series 1 (1999) ===
No.	Title	Original release date
1	"Romeo and Juliet"	8 March 1999
2	"The Road Not Taken"	15 March 1999
3	"The Golden Whistle"	22 March 1999
4	"Something for the Weekend"	29 March 1999
5	"Kung Fu Fighting"	19 April 1999
6	"Survival of the Fittest"	20 April 1999

=== Series 2 (2000) ===
No.	Title	Original release date
7	"The Beautiful Game"	9 January 2000
8	"The Gold Star"	16 January 2000
9	"The Beast with Two Backs"	23 January 2000
10	"One Day in the Life"	30 January 2000
11	"The Search for Extraterrestrial Intelligence"	6 February 2000
12	"Driving Miss Titley"	13 February 2000
13	"The Bionic Boy"	20 February 2000
14	"The Pon Farr"	27 February 2000
15	"The Memory Gland"	5 March 2000
16	"The Prime of Mr Doug Digby"	12 March 2000

=== Series 3 (2001) ===
Series 3 ended with a 45 minute special to conclude the series, the original intention was this special to be concluded into two episodes, however due to failing ratings it was decided the series would be wrapped up quicker and these two episodes were merged into one, this is evident during the episode due to the narration and the gap in transmission.

No.	Title	Original release date
17	"The Big Sleep"	22 January 2001
18	"Death and the Maiden"	29 January 2001
19	"Ecce Homo"	5 February 2001
20	"An Inspector Calls"	12 February 2001
21	"Forbidden Fruit"	19 February 2001
22	"The Grimley Curse"	1 April 2001

== Home media ==
Very few episodes of The Grimleys have been released for public purchase.

Series 1 was released on VHS in 2000, both as a boxed set of the complete series and as two separate releases containing three episodes each. Series 2, Series 3 and the finale have not been released.

The pilot episode from 1997 was released on VHS in 2001, featuring a five-minute introduction to the series by Noddy Holder.

In 2000 a two-disc soundtrack album was released and peaked at number 17 in the UK Compilation Chart. Another two-disc soundtrack album was released in 2001. The first album focused on glam metal and pop songs from the 1970s, and was titled Get Down and Get With it, Here Come the Grimleys. The second album featured punk, post-punk and new wave songs from the late 1970s, and was titled The Official Soundtrack to the Hit TV Show The Grimleys.
