= Lost Souls (1998 film) =

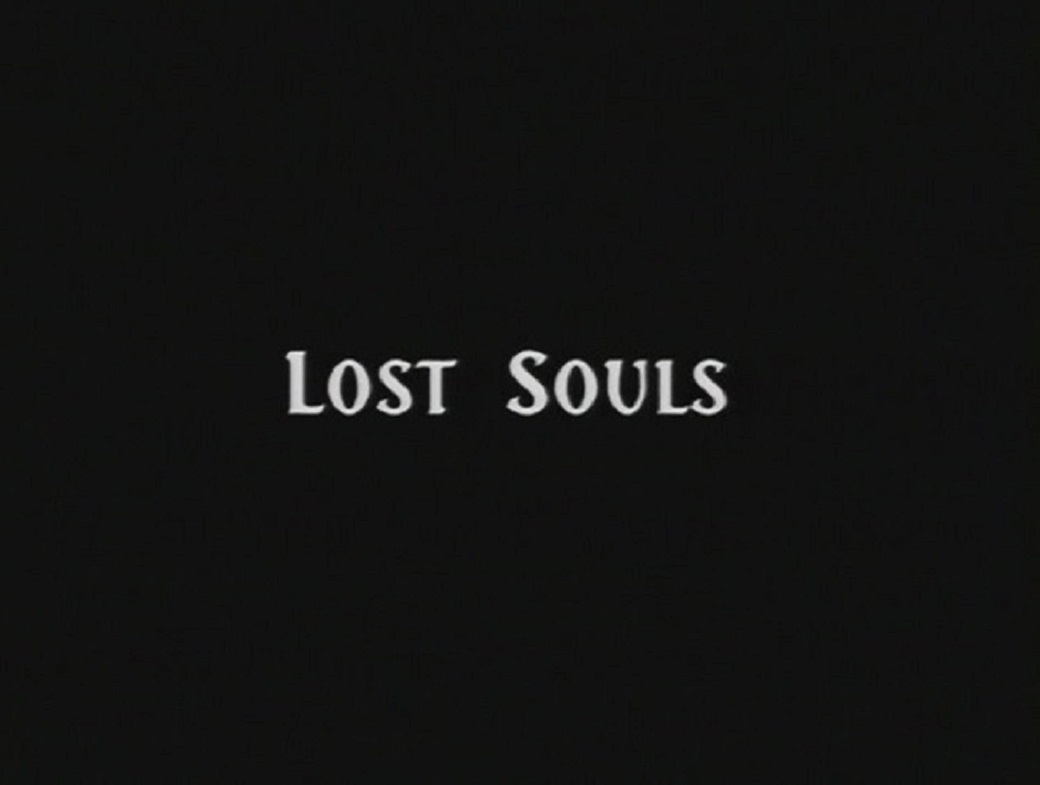
- Genre: Drama, Suspense
- Written by: Scott Peters
- Directed by: Jeff Woolnough
- Starring: John Savage; Barbara Sukowa; Richard Lintern; Laura Harling; Bob Sherman; Ted Rusoff; Gary Beadle
- Music by: Jonathan Goldsmith
- Country of origin: United States
- Original language: English

Production
- Producers: Ken Gord; Stephen Ujlaki
- Running time: 90 minutes
- Production companies: Alliance Atlantis Communications; CLT-UFA International; Delux Productions S.A.; Chesler/Perlmutter Productions

Original release
- Network: UPN
- Release: November 12, 1998

Lost Souls is a UPN television movie that debuted in 1998 as part of the "Thursday Night at the Movies" block that ran from 1998–2000. It is one of six movies created by the same production team and branded Nightworld. It aired frequently on the Fox Family Channel, including in its 13 Nights of Halloween special each October.

== Synopsis ==
Victor Robinson has just moved into a country home with his family. When his son, Jesse, finds an old Edison invention and begins to play it, he hears the sounds of children laughing and playing. This is followed by Victor's autistic 12-year-old daughter, Meaghan, painting and singing; this is surrounded by strange occurrences around the house. When Victor discovers that two children were murdered in the area years before, he believes they are trying to contact him; he also believes that their neighbor is responsible for the murders.

== Cast ==
- John Savage as Victor Robinson
- Barbara Sukowa as Sheila Robinson
- Nicolas Diegman as Jesse Robinson
- Laura Harling as Meghan Robinson
- Richard Lintern as Graham Scofield
- Robert Sherman as George Giffard
- Jean-François Wolff as Elson Garrett
- Ted Rusoff as Humphrey Garrett
- Christian Erickson as Jack Mennias
- Claudette Roche as Dr. Hollings
- Gary Beadle as Stuart Markle
- Mark O'Hagan as Young Elson
- Jody Scott as Helen Norris (deleted scene-uncredited)

== Filming locations ==
Although the movie takes place in Ulster County, New York, in the fictional city Chesapequa, it was filmed in various cities in Luxembourg such as scenes in the forested area of Berdorf called the Mullerthal Trail, which is a popular tourist attraction that leads to many caves such as the famous Hohllay Cave. The fictional Templeton House is located in the village of Lultzhausen, in Esch-sur-Sûre near the Upper Sûre Lake. Despite the house backing onto a cave system in the film, the house is actually on a peninsula, surrounded by the lake.

== Select cable showings ==
- November 12, 1998 - UPN
- April 1, 1999 - UPN
- October 21, 2000 - FOX Family
- January 18, 2001 - FOX Family
- February 25, 2001 - FOX Family
- March 3, 2001 - FOX Family
- June 3, 2001 - FOX Family
- August 19, 2001 - FOX Family
- October 20, 2001 - FOX Family
- October 26, 2001 - FOX Family
- October 31, 2001 - FOX Family
- November 17, 2001 - ABC Family
- December 30, 2001 - ABC Family
- January 31, 2002 - ABC Family
- March 3, 2002 - ABC Family
- October 19, 2002 - ABC Family
- October 23, 2002 - ABC Family
- October 24, 2002 - ABC Family
- May 19, 2007 - TNT

== Home media ==
In the United States, Lost Souls was released on DVD on June 15, 2010, by Echo Bridge Home Entertainment in several double feature DVD packs. Filmrise acquired distribution rights in 2019, and it is available to watch On Demand through Amazon Prime Video.

In Germany Lost Souls was released on May 16, 2014, on DVD by Pidax film media Ltd., with the title Haus der verlorenen Seelen.

In Japan Lost Souls was released on 2000 on VHS.

== Certifications ==
The film originally aired on Television under the rating of TV-PG, but was not submitted for rating for home media in the United States, and a "Not Rated" certification with "Brief Profanity" is listed on the DVD releases by Echo Bridge Home Entertainment.
