= Laura Harling =

British actress

Laura Anne Harling BEM
- Born: 21 March 1986 (age 39); Eastbourne, Sussex, England
- Occupations: Actress, theatre producer, artist
- Known for: Child acting, stage and opera roles, founding The Dot Collective
- Awards: British Empire Medal (2023)

Laura Anne Harling BEM (born 21 March 1986) is a British actress, theatre producer and artist who has played roles with the Royal Shakespeare Company and at the Royal Opera House. She began as a child actor on stage, in films and on television. After post-graduate training at the Drama Studio London, Harling has focused on stage and opera roles and producing. She co-founded First Draft Theatre (2010–2017), for which she was also artistic director, and in 2016 founded The Dot Collective, a registered charity which gives professional drama performances in care environments.

== Early life, child acting career and education ==
Harling was born in Eastbourne in Sussex in 1986, the daughter of Kevin K Harling and Susan M Harling (née Extence). In 1995, aged nine, she appeared as Anna in Morning and Evening at the Hampstead Theatre, and the same year she played the granddaughter of Belle, Scrooge's former fiancée, in an adaptation of Charles Dickens's A Christmas Carol with the Royal Shakespeare Company. She soon appeared in several television advertisements and next played Young Betsy in Catherine Cookson's film The Girl (1996) and Young Jane in the TV film Jane Eyre (1997). She then appeared in further television and film roles, including Young Sophia in The History of Tom Jones, a Foundling (1997), Emily in Invasion: Earth (1998), Meaghan in Lost Souls (1998), Ella in Polterguests, Poppy in Casualty (1999) and Little Em'ly in David Copperfield (1999), starring Daniel Radcliffe and Maggie Smith. These were followed by the roles of Ann in There's a Viking in My Bed (2000), Ethel in Gosford Park (2001), Lucy in My Family (2004), and Sylvanna in Silent Witness (2006).

Harling studied at the Drama Studio London, graduating in 2009.

== Adult career ==
In 2010 Harling appeared in London as Claire in The Long Christmas Ride Home by Paula Vogel, as Puck in A Midsummer Night's Dream at the Rose Theatre, Bankside, as Ascanius in Dido and Aeneas at The Actors' Church, Covent Garden, and in the one-woman play A Woman Alone by Dario Fo and Franca Rame at the Brockley Jack Theatre. The following year she appeared in the title role of Woman Bomb at the Edinburgh Festival and at the Tristan Bates Theatre in London. Miriam Gillinson, writing for Time Out, thought she was "cold and steely" in her portrayal of a suicide bomber. Also in 2011, she appeared as Magaret Mee in the premiere of the contemporary opera The Moonflower (2011). In 2012 and 2013 she appeared as Angel Archivist in the opera Written on Skin by George Benjamin, directed by Katie Mitchell, at Aix-en-Provence and other venues, followed by the Royal Opera House. She repeated this in New York City's Lincoln Center in 2015. In 2013, she appeared as Maryas and Henry Henry in Gertrude Stein's Say It With Flowers, also directed by Mitchell, at the Hampstead Theatre Downstairs. In 2015, among other roles, Harling appeared at the Arts Theatre as Joan in Lovesong of the Electric Bear by Snoo Wilson. In 2016 she starred as Anya in Turf at the King's Head Theatre in London.

She was the co-founder and artistic director of First Draft Theatre (2010–17), which presented original works and adaptations. In 2016 she formed The Dot Collective to produce theatre in care environments for those unable to attend the theatre. She has also worked as a producer for the London Festival Fringe, London Fringe Radio and Universal Citizens.

Harling was awarded the British Empire Medal (BEM) in the 2023 New Year Honours for services to professional theatre in care homes and supporting people with dementia.
