= Bodies (2004 TV series) =

British television medical drama

- Genre: Medical drama
- Created by: Jed Mercurio
- Written by: Jed Mercurio; Rachel Anthony; Richard Zajdlic
- Starring: Max Beesley; Patrick Baladi; Neve McIntosh; Keith Allen; Susan Lynch; Tamzin Malleson; Preeya Kalidas; Simon Lowe; Hattie Morahan; Vicky Hall; Nicholas Palliser; Saskia Reeves; Mary Stockley
- Theme music composer: John Lunn
- Country of origin: United Kingdom
- Original language: English
- No. of series: 2
- No. of episodes: 17

Production
- Executive producers: John Yorke; Mark Redhead; Gareth Neame
- Producer: Jed Mercurio
- Cinematography: Nick Dance
- Running time: 60 minutes
- Production company: Hat Trick Productions

Original release
- Network: BBC Three
- Release: 23 June 2004 – 13 December 2006

Bodies is a British television medical drama produced by Hat Trick Productions for the BBC. Created by Jed Mercurio, the series first broadcast on 23 June 2004, and is based on Mercurio's book of the same name. The series is centred on specialist registrar Rob Lake (Max Beesley), who starts in a new post in the obstetrics and gynaecology department at the fictional South Central Infirmary, under the guidance of consultant obstetrician Roger Hurley (Patrick Baladi).

The series differed from most other archetypal British hospital dramas, in that the surgical scenes were notable for their graphic nature, offering intimate detail of various procedures, and the operational complications dealt with in explicit detail. As a result, the themes were also often dark and depressing, including negligence, manipulation and death. Bodies has been described as a "dark, sometimes funny" take on a genre that had been made popular through shows such as Casualty and Holby City. In December 2009, The Times ranked Bodies in ninth place in its list of "Shows of the Decade", and in January 2010, The Guardian ranked Bodies number twenty of "The Greatest Television Dramas of All Time".

The first series was released on DVD on 30 October 2006. The second series, including the finale, was released on 26 December 2006. A complete box set was released on 9 April 2007. The show was made available via the BBC iPlayer service on 6 April 2019.

== Broadcast ==
The first series started on BBC Three, as the channel was trying to break into hour-long dramas. BBC Two aired the series at the end of 2004. The channels co-commissioned a second series and increased the number of episodes to ten. The second series started in September 2005. The BBC did not order a third series, so a feature-length final episode was subsequently broadcast to conclude the programme in December 2006. The entire first and second series were also broadcast to American audiences on digital channel BBC America during 2005. In 2022 Netflix began streaming the series in the UK.

== Cast ==
- Max Beesley as Mr. Rob Lake
- Patrick Baladi as Mr. Roger Hurley
- Neve McIntosh as Sister Donna Rix
- Keith Allen as Mr. Tony Whitman
- Susan Lynch as Dr. Maria Orton
- Tamzin Malleson as Miss Polly Grey
- Preeya Kalidas as Dr. Maya Dutta
- Simon Lowe as Dr. Tim Sibley
- Karen Bryson as Hazel Melrose
- Nicholas Palliser as Sir Paul Tennant
- Liz Hume Dawson as Dottie Sands
- Rhashan Stone as Tom Gorman
- Hattie Morahan as Dr. Beth Lucas
- Vicky Hall as Chrissy Farrell
- Ingeborga Dapkunaite as Katya Bredova
- Saskia Reeves as Ms Mary Dodd
- Mary Stockley as Susannah Marshall

Pailliser portrays the same character he did in Mercurio's previous medical drama, Cardiac Arrest.

== Episodes ==
=== Series 1 (2004) ===
Lake (Max Beesley) realises that despite his friendly, professional demeanour and strong academics, his boss, Hurley (Patrick Baladi), is an incompetent surgeon who regularly bungles surgical procedures, to the detriment of his patients. Hurley is, however, protected by the principle "Doctors look after doctors", a phrase often repeated throughout the series. Initially, Lake is also protected by this principle, when his involvement in a death of a patient is covered up, although this death haunts him. Initially, Lake seeks to become a whistleblower, after seeing Hurley's gross incompetence and negligence, particularly after he badly mishandles a birth in which an abruption occurs, leaving the mother with substantial brain damage. The anaesthetist for the operation, Dr. Maria Orton (Susan Lynch), makes an official complaint against Hurley, but her colleagues close ranks around him. The pregnant Dr. Orton is ostracised, and the stress of the situation causes her to miscarry. She is eventually sectioned and admitted to a psychiatric hospital. Pressure from outside authorities, hospital politics and blackmail from Hurley eventually forces Lake into silence. Unable to oust him yet forced to work with him, Lake soon seeks a way out and finds a post at another hospital. But Hurley, despite agreeing that he should move on, changes his mind, ruins Lake's chance to escape by informing his new employers of Lake's mistakes and his real reasons for wanting to leave. At the end of the season, Hurley is shown to be in line for promotion as the hospital's clinical director. Lake, trapped in his job, comes clean to the relatives of the patient whose death he caused, so that, in his own words, he may be judged. The series ends on this cliffhanger.

No.	Title	Directed by	Written by	Original release date
1	"Episode 1"	John Strickland	Jed Mercurio	23 June 2004
2	"Episode 2"	John Strickland	Jed Mercurio	30 June 2004
3	"Episode 3"	Richard Laxton	Jed Mercurio	6 July 2004
4	"Episode 4"	Richard Laxton	Jed Mercurio	13 July 2004
5	"Episode 5"	Jon East	Jed Mercurio	20 July 2004
6	"Episode 6"	Jon East	Jed Mercurio	27 July 2004

=== Series 2 (2005) ===
The series continues with the main overlying storyline of the constant struggle between Hurley and Lake. This season also saw the arrival of a new departmental manager, Chrissy Farrell (Vicky Hall). At the start of the second series, Lake is about to leave the hospital but, with no real job prospects elsewhere, he decides to remain. Lake and Hurley then begin to form a respectful professional relationship, with Lake turning a blind eye to Hurley's incompetence. Despite this, Donna Rix (Neve McIntosh), a nurse with whom Lake was having an affair, views Hurley's ineptitude with increasing alarm. She starts to voice her distress and sends anonymous letters to management in an attempt to bring wider attention to this issue. Lake, seeing this, pleads with Donna to act with restraint, claiming that Hurley will be brought down but not in this fashion. Towards the end of the series, Hurley's life begins to unravel. Attempts to have a third child are scuppered after he finds out he has a low sperm count and furthermore, is suspected of having an affair with a fellow doctor, soon leading to the breakdown of his marriage.

No.	Title	Directed by	Written by	Original release date
1	"Episode 1"	John Strickland	Jed Mercurio	18 September 2005
2	"Episode 2"	John Strickland	Jed Mercurio	1 October 2005
3	"Episode 3"	Iain B. Macdonald	Jed Mercurio	2 October 2005
4	"Episode 4"	Iain B. Macdonald	Jed Mercurio	9 October 2005
5	"Episode 5"	Douglas Mackinnon	Jed Mercurio	16 October 2005
6	"Episode 6"	Douglas Mackinnon	Jed Mercurio	23 October 2005
7	"Episode 7"	Iain B. Macdonald	Richard Zajdlic	6 November 2005
8	"Episode 8"	Iain B. Macdonald	Rachel Anthony	12 November 2005
9	"Episode 9"	Jed Mercurio	Jed Mercurio	20 November 2005
10	"Episode 10"	Jed Mercurio	Jed Mercurio	20 November 2005

=== Finale (2006) ===
No.	Title	Directed by	Written by	Original release date
1	"Finale"	John Strickland	Jed Mercurio	13 December 2006
Lake is now placed at a University Hospital, and is about to father a child with co-worker Polly Grey (Tamzin Malleson). Hurley's life, however, has continued to deteriorate. He is forced to resign from his position after being arrested for indecent exposure and takes up a new job, coincidentally at Rob's new place of work. Donna on the other hand has left nursing altogether and has become a journalist. When Lake and Hurley meet up once more, old tensions are revived. However, Hurley's reputation has experienced significant decline and is a far weaker figure in Lake's eyes. Consequently, he renews his attacks on Hurley's incompetence with renewed vigour, especially after encountering another maternal and foetal death at the hands of Hurley; and also by the fact Lake has begun to show symptoms of Creutzfeldt–Jakob disease due to Hurley cutting Lake during a surgical operation, so feels he has little to lose. Lake's girlfriend Polly then goes into labour. Complications soon arise and the baby has to be delivered surgically, giving Lake an opportunity to lay a trap for Hurley. Hurley begins to operate with Lake closely observing, and partway through Lake falsely claims to have seen him about to harm Polly and forces him to step aside. Lake then delivers the baby successfully, but Polly is so distraught by being used to entrap Hurley that she promises that he will never see her or his baby. Consequently Lake, without a family and with a potentially fatal disease, decides to ruin Hurley's career by falsely reporting to the General Medical Council that he had to stop Hurley cutting into Polly's bladder, which leads to Hurley's suspension from his position as consultant at University Hospital. The final scene shows Lake finding out whether or not he has contracted the human strain of Mad cow disease.

== Awards and nominations ==
Year	Association	Category	Nominee(s)	Result
2004	British Academy Television Awards	Best Drama Series	Jed Mercurio, Mark Redhead, Sue de Beauvoir	Nominated
2004	Royal Television Society Craft & Design Awards	Make Up - Drama	Davy Jones, Lin Davie	Won
2005	Royal Television Society Programme Awards	Best Drama Series	Jed Mercurio, Mark Redhead, Sue de Beauvoir	Nominated
2005	Royal Television Society Programme Awards	Best Drama Writer	Jed Mercurio	Nominated
2005	British Academy Television Awards	Best Drama Series	Jed Mercurio, Mark Redhead, Sue de Beauvoir	Nominated
2006	Royal Television Society Programme Awards	Best Drama Series	Jed Mercurio, Mark Redhead, Sue de Beauvoir	Won
2006	Royal Television Society Programme Awards	Best Drama Writer	Jed Mercurio	Nominated
2006	Royal Television Society Craft & Design Awards	Visual Effects - Special Effects	Neill Gorton, Rob Mayor, Millennium FX	Won
2007	Royal Television Society Craft & Design Awards	Visual Effects - Special Effects	Millennium FX, Neill Gorton, Rob Mayor	Won
