= Trinity (2026 TV series) =

American-British television series

- Genre: Thriller
- Created by: Jed Mercurio
- Written by: Jed Mercurio
- Directed by: Michael Cuesta
- Starring: Richard Madden; Gugu Mbatha-Raw; Marcia Gay Harden; JD Pardo
- Countries of origin: United States; United Kingdom
- Original language: English

Production
- Executive producers: Jed Mercurio; Michael Cuesta; Jimmy Mulville; Wendy Mericle
- Production companies: 20th Television; HTM Television

Original release
- Network: Netflix

Trinity is an upcoming thriller television series from Jed Mercurio, starring Richard Madden and Gugu Mbatha-Raw. It is set to be released on Netflix on December 1, 2026.

== Premise ==
A naval commander and the Secretary of Defence become involved in a conspiracy.

== Cast ==
=== Main ===
- Richard Madden as Secretary of Defence Webb Preston
- Gugu Mbatha-Raw as Commander Katherine Decker
- Marcia Gay Harden as Margaret Vandenburg
- JD Pardo as Tom Reyes

=== Recurring ===
- James Remar as President Paul Barnard
- Robert Wisdom as Griff Tatum
- Bruce Greenwood as Eric Colby
- Kirk Acevedo as Jock Campbell
- Ben Cotton as Jake Ryan
- Jason Ralph as Brooks Vandenburg
- Mark O’Brien as Brian York

== Production ==
=== Development ===
The eight-part series from 20th Television has Jed Mercurio as writer, showrunner and executive producer alongside Michael Cuesta, who is also directing episodes. Jimmy Mulville for Hat Trick Mercurio is also executive producer, with Wendy Mericle.

=== Casting ===
The cast is led by Richard Madden and Gugu Mbatha-Raw. In July 2025, Marcia Gay Harden and JD Pardo joined the main cast and James Remar, Robert Wisdom, Bruce Greenwood, Kirk Acevedo, Ben Cotton, Jason Ralph and Mark O’Brien joined the recurring cast.

=== Filming ===
Principal photogrqphy took place in Vancouver, Canada, starting in July and scheduled to last into November 2025.

== Release ==
The series will be available to stream on Netflix on December 1, 2026.
