= Vicky Hall =

British actress and nurse (born 1977)

- Born: 25 February 1977 (age 49); Newcastle upon Tyne, England
- Occupations: Actress; nurse

Vicky Hall (born 25 February 1977) is an English actress and nurse. She was born in Newcastle, England. She trained in drama at Queen Margaret University, Edinburgh.

Hall is best known for her character Lindsay in British comedy-drama Teachers. She has also appeared in television series Hustle, Bodies, Shameless, Holby City, Bonekickers, The Break, Byker Grove, Tracy Beaker Returns, and Inside No. 9, as well as Derek in 2014, Casualty and CBBC series So Awkward in 2015 and Vera in 2019. In 2019, inspired by her acting roles as a nurse, she enlisted and became a nurse at the Alexandra Hospital in Redditch, Worcestershire. Then in 2022, she appeared in three episodes of the BBC soap opera Doctors as Lydia Palmer.
