= American Adulterer =

2009 biographical novel by Jed Mercurio

American Adulterer is a 2009 novel written by Jed Mercurio focusing on the life of 35th President of the United States John Fitzgerald Kennedy. It mainly talks about his extramarital affairs, political ambitions, various physical ailments and his relationship with his wife Jackie and his children.

Kirkus Reviews stated that the author was sometimes "too insistent" on the subject, and that overall the work is "Stylish, intelligent, often persuasive".

Publishers Weekly stated that the work has an "empathetic" tone.

== See also ==
- An Unfinished Life: John F. Kennedy, 1917-1963
- The Dark Side of Camelot
- Jeff Golden#Books - Unafraid: A Novel of the Possible
