= Bodies (novel) =

Book by Jed Mercurio

First edition (publ. Jonathan Cape)

Bodies is the first novel written by the British doctor-turned-novelist and -scriptwriter Jed Mercurio. It was published in 2002 and formed the basis of the award-winning BBC medical drama Bodies.
