= Jonathan Dow =

English actor

- Born: Redditch, Worcestershire, England
- Other name: Jo Dow
- Occupation: Actor
- Years active: 1979–present
- Spouse: Anna Healy
- Children: 3

Jonathan Dow is a British actor and voiceover artist. He joined the National Youth Theatre at the age of 14, and after finishing his A levels he trained at the Guildhall Drama School. His first big television role was as Under Secretary Tim in No Job for a Lady (ITV, 1990) with Penelope Keith.

He has also appeared as P.C. Stringer in The Bill (ITV, 1990–1993) and Dr. James Mortimer in the Jed Mercurio series Cardiac Arrest (BBC, 1994–1996). He also appeared in one episode of Sooty & Co. as a police officer.

In 2018, Dow recorded a two-part interview for The Bill Podcast to discuss his life and career. In 2019, Dow appeared in the fifth series of Jed Mercurio's drama series Line of Duty.

== Personal life ==
Dow lives in London and has three sons.
