= Ascent (novel) =

2007 novel by Jed Mercurio

- First edition (publ. Jonathan Cape)
- Author: Jed Mercurio
- Publisher: Jonathan Cape
- Publication date: April 3, 2007
- ISBN: 978-0-224-07286-1

Ascent is a 2007 secret history novel by British writer Jed Mercurio. It follows the career of Yevgeni Yeremin, an orphan of Stalingrad, from his days as a MiG-15 pilot in the Korean War to his later years as a cosmonaut.

== Plot ==
The novel follows Yevgeni Yeremin, first as an orphan and then his time as a fighter pilot in the Korean War, where he crashes in a plane bearing USSR insignia. Although rescued by North Korean troops he is felt to have risked revealing that Soviet aircrew participated in the conflict and on cessation of hostilities he is exiled in disgrace to a polar base. He has been befriended by one of his groundcrew, (throughout referred to as 'The Widow'), who follows him north, and he eventually marries her. He becomes a trainee cosmonaut, with little hope of a mission; he eventually volunteers for a risky mission to attempt a lunar landing ahead of Apollo 11, in an untested lunar craft. He knows that if he fails, his death will lead to little comment, and be denied by the Soviet government. He succeeds in achieving a landing, on the far side of the Moon, but the lander rocket has malfunctioned, leaving him no hope of return. The novel ends with his descending from the doomed craft to walk on the lunar surface, as the lights in the stranded craft gradually go out.

== Literary significance and reception ==
Ascent achieved excellent reviews in the United Kingdom, notably by The Telegraph and Michel Faber in The Guardian. The Guardian included Ascent in their list of "1000 Novels Everyone Must Read Before They Die". American reviews were mixed. Booklist called it a "stunning debut from a writer who bears close attention." The San Diego Union-Tribune said that absent the human components that would have made the journey more complete. But in space, untethered, it's a nerve-shredding, unsettling and, ultimately, a deeply satisfying techno-adventure." Kirkus Reviews were more critical in their commentary saying "the author displays high ambition, covering themes of duty, disgrace and redemption, and Yefgenii's story possesses a certain grandeur. But the character himself is a cipher, a prop to build a plot around. The protagonist never quite comes alive, and so neither does the novel." Publishers Weekly had similar thoughts on the character of Yeremin saying "too many details of training pad out a short book, and nothing in it really tells us enough about Yeremin to make us care what happens to him."

== Adaptations ==
The novel was serialised in 10 episodes in the BBC's Book at Bedtime in August 2007.

A graphic novelisation of Ascent was published in 2011. The original text was abridged by Mercurio and illustrated by Wesley Robins. It was generally well received. Rachel Cooke in The Observer wrote it was "gripping drama,[with] a certain emotional brevity, a way of turning technical terms into a kind of poetry ... poignant and atmospheric drawings".
