= James Bradshaw (actor) =

English actor

- Born: Stamford, England
- Education: Birmingham School of Acting
- Occupation: Actor
- Years active: 1997–present

James Bradshaw is an English actor, known for his roles as Gordon Grimley in the Granada series The Grimleys, D.S Geoff Thorpe in Hollyoaks, and Dr. Max DeBryn in Endeavour.

== Early life and education ==
Robert Bradshaw was born in Stamford, Lincolnshire, England.

He attended the Birmingham School of Acting.

== Career ==
=== TV ===
Bradshaw's television roles include parts in Mile High, Primeval, Heartbeat, the 2000 film Longitude, and Noah Claypole in Alan Bleasdale's 1999 adaptation of Oliver Twist, which starred Robert Lindsay. Bradshaw has worked at the Birmingham Rep, Hampstead Theatre, and the Royal National Theatre in House/Garden, directed by Sir Alan Ayckbourn. In 2006, he played Polly Tompkins in The Line of Beauty.

In July 2011 he made a guest appearance as a surveyor in Coronation Street and as an environmental health inspector named Matthew Grindlay in EastEnders in November 2012. From November 2014 Bradshaw played the recurring role of DS Geoff Thorpe in Channel 4 soap opera Hollyoaks, until DS Thorpe was killed off in March 2018.

From 2012 he performed the role of pathologist Dr. Max DeBryn in the ITV series Endeavour, the prequel series to Inspector Morse.

=== Film ===
Bradshaw's film roles include appearances in Minotaur and Irish Jam. In 2008 he appeared as Mr Samgrass in the film adaptation of Evelyn Waugh's Brideshead Revisited.

=== Stage ===
In 2009, he joined the cast of Breakfast at Tiffany's at the Theatre Royal, Haymarket.

== Filmography ==
Film
Year	Title	Role	Notes
2006	Minotaur	Ziko	
2006	Irish Jam	Malachy McNulty	
2008	Brideshead Revisited	Mr Samgrass	
2011	Recompense	Cedric	Short film
2012	Undefeated	Mr Ward	
2015	Convenience	Clive	
2018	Scenes From The Life Of A Priest	Harold	Short film
2019	The Car: Road to Revenge	Yasha	

Television
Year	Title	Role	Notes	Ref.
1997, 1999–2001	The Grimleys	Gordon Grimley		
1999	Oliver Twist	Noah Claypole	Episode 2	
2000	Longitude	Callboy		
2001	In a Land of Plenty	Simon Freeman	3 episodes	
2003	Mile High	Gary	Episode 1.10	
2004	The Afternoon Play	Eric	Episode: "Drive"	
2004	Heartbeat	Don	Episode: "No Hard Feelings"	
2005	Doctors	Kevin	Episode: "Doctor's Orders"	
2006	The Line of Beauty	Polly Tompkins	3 episodes	
2007–2011	Primeval	Duncan	4 episodes	
2008	Doctors	Ray Dillon	Episode: "The Man Who Wasn't There"	
2008	Casualty	Alan Smith	Episode: "Broken Homes"	
2009	Garrow's Law	Edgar Cole	Episode 1.3	
2011	Doctors	James	Episode: "My Hero"	
	Coronation Street	Surveyor	1 episode	
2012–2023	Endeavour	Dr. Max DeBryn		
2012	EastEnders	Matthew Grindley	1 episode	
2013	Lucan	Charlie Benson		
2014	Doctors	Geoff Smith	Episode: "The Wicca Man"	
2014–2018	Hollyoaks	D.S. Geoff Thorpe	75 episodes	
2016	Close to the Enemy	Mr. Emmanuel	3 episodes	
2018	The Reluctant Landlord	Gareth	Episode: "Win, Lose Or Brewery"	
2020	Doctors	Clive Keep	Episode: "After Dark"	
2022	Four Lives	DI Ian Duffield	Episode 3	
2024	Doctors	Kevin Hill	Episode: "At What Cost?"	
2026	The Witness	DI Tony Nash	Episode 3	

== Stage ==
Year	Title	Role	Notes	Ref.
	Violent Outing	Rich	Soho Theatre	
2000	Terracotta	Ian	Hampstead Theatre, Birmingham Repertory Theatre	
2000	House & Garden	Jake Mace	Royal National Theatre	
2001–2002	The Wind in the Willows	Mr Mole	Birmingham Repertory Theatre	
2002–2003	The Hobbit	Bilbo Baggins	Vanessa Ford Productions	
2007	Plunder	Oswald Veal	Watermill Theatre, Greenwich Theatre	
2009–2010	Breakfast at Tiffany's	Rusty Trawler	Theatre Royal Haymarket	
2013–2014	Heather Gardner	George Desmond	Birmingham Repertory Theatre	
2023	The Way Old Friends Do	Edward	Park Theatre (London)	

=== Radio ===
Year	Title	Role	Notes	Ref.
2000	Summer of Love	Colin	BBC Radio 4	
2004	What Hetty Did	Ted	BBC Radio 4	
2005	The Rotter's Club	Ben Trotter	BBC Radio 4	
