= Jed Mercurio =

British TV writer, director (born 1966)

Jed Mercurio OBE
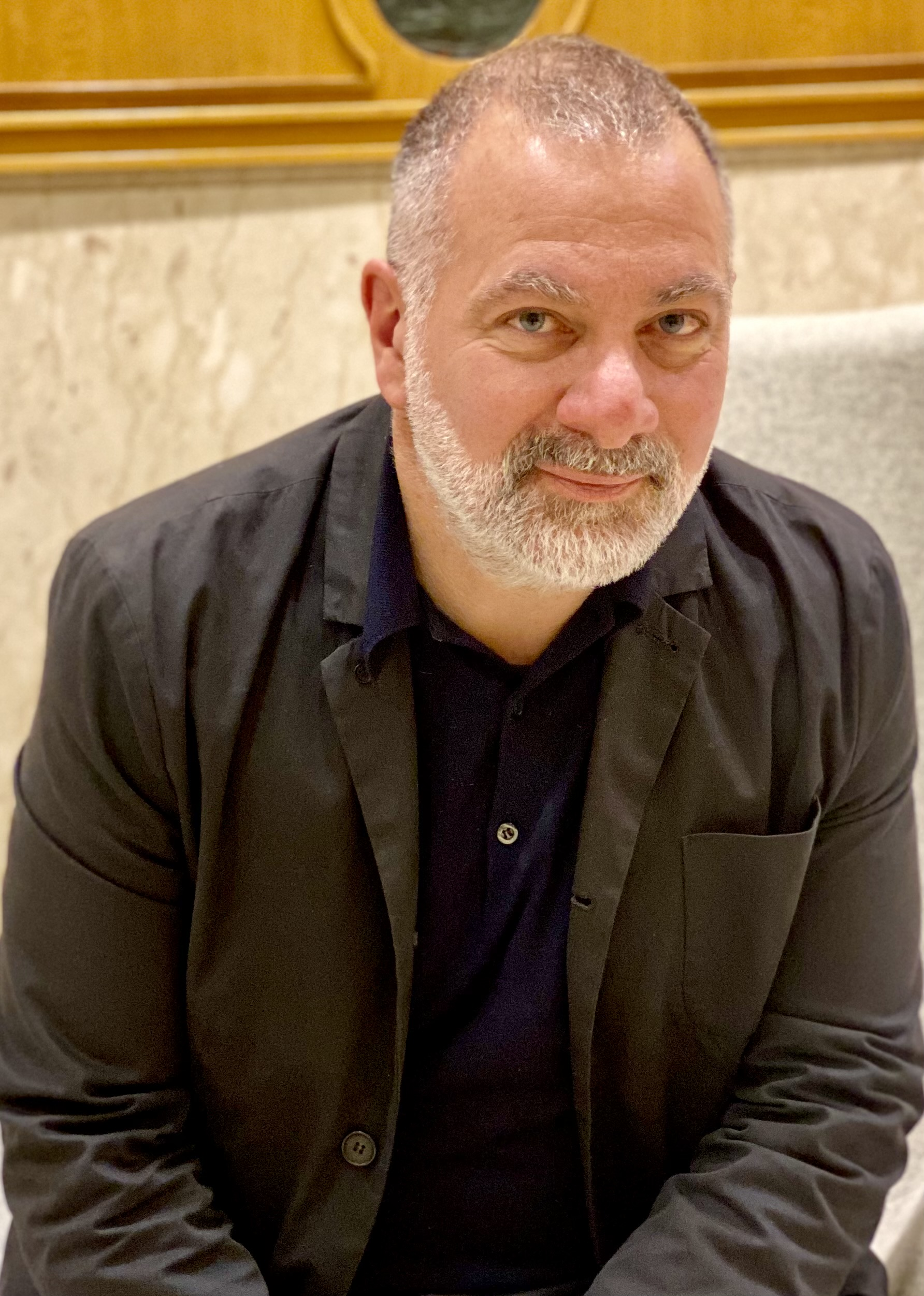
- Mercurio in 2021
- Born: Gerald Gary Mercurio; September 1966 (age 60); Nelson, Lancashire, England
- Education: University of Birmingham Medical School
- Occupations: Television writer, producer, director and novelist
- Known for: Bodies (2004–2006); Line of Duty (2012–present); Bodyguard (2018)
- Partner: Elaine Cameron
- Children: 2

Gerald Gary Mercurio OBE (born September 1966) is a British television writer, producer, director and novelist. A former hospital doctor and Royal Air Force officer, Mercurio has been ranked among UK television's leading writers. In 2017, Mercurio was awarded a Fellowship of the Royal Television Society and the Baird Medal by RTS Midlands.

Mercurio's works for television include the series Line of Duty, Bodyguard, Bodies (based on his 2002 novel), The Grimleys, and Cardiac Arrest. His books are Bodies (2002), Ascent (2007), American Adulterer (2009) and, for children, The Penguin Expedition (2003).

== Early life ==
Mercurio was born in Nelson, Lancashire, but grew up in Cannock, Staffordshire. His parents were Italian immigrants, with his father working as a coal miner. He studied at the University of Birmingham Medical School. During his third year, in August 1988, he was commissioned as a pilot officer in the Royal Air Force Medical Branch. He received flying training with the University Air Squadron, with the intention of specialising in aviation medicine. He was promoted to flying officer in June 1991, but resigned his commission in February 1992.

During practice as a hospital physician, Mercurio answered an advertisement in the British Medical Journal and, despite little writing experience, scripted the BBC medical drama Cardiac Arrest under the pseudonym John MacUre. Subsequently he retired from medicine to pursue a writing career under his own name.

== Career ==
=== 1990s ===
Mercurio's writing debut, Cardiac Arrest (1994–96), caused controversy due to its realistic depiction of hospital life. The series was twice nominated in the Best Original Drama category by the Writers' Guild of Great Britain and topped a poll of UK medical professionals as the most realistic medical drama of all time. Mercurio served as medical adviser on the second series of Cardiac Arrest, which he cites as his apprenticeship in producing/directing.

Mercurio wrote and produced the science fiction drama series Invasion: Earth, which ran for six episodes on BBC1 in 1998.

Jed Mercurio entered a new genre when he created The Grimleys, a comedy series set in the Black Country, which ran for three series (1999–2001) on ITV.

=== 2000s ===
Mercurio adapted his first novel, Bodies (2002), into an award-winning television series. Mercurio assumed the producer/showrunner position for the first time on Bodies (2004–06), a role he has fulfilled on all his subsequent original series. The Times ranked Bodies in "Shows of the Decade" and The Guardian placed it in "The Greatest TV Dramas of All Time." The series won the Royal Television Society Award for Best Drama Series, was twice nominated for the BAFTA Award for Best Drama Series and Mercurio was also twice nominated as Best Drama Writer by the Royal Television Society.

His critically acclaimed second novel, Ascent (2007), was ranked among the 1000 Novels Everyone Must Read.

=== 2010s ===
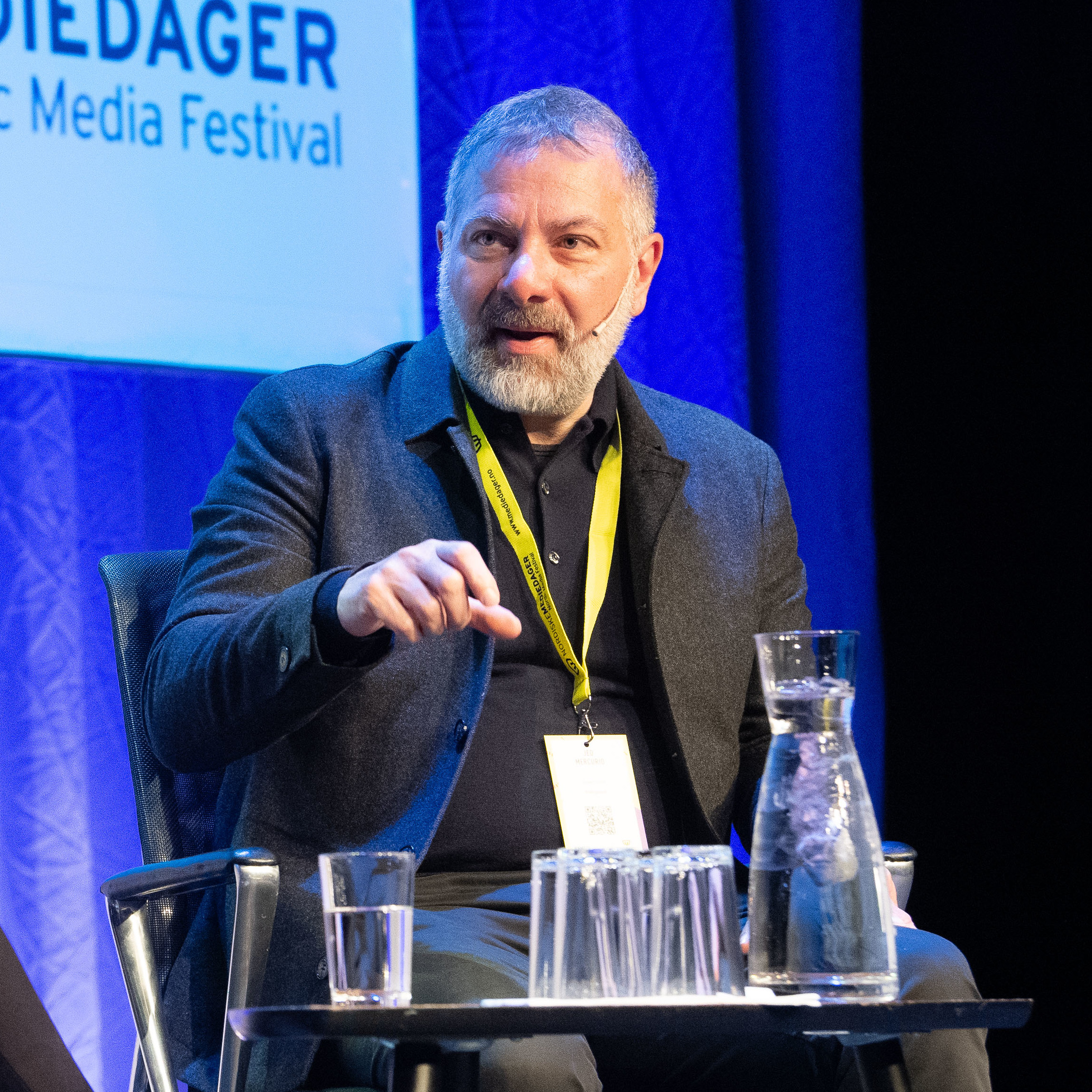
Mercurio in 2019

Mercurio's next original drama series, Line of Duty (first broadcast 26 June 2012), premiered as BBC2's then best-performing drama series in 10 years with 4.1 million viewers. A well-received second series (first broadcast 12 February 2014) resulted in the BBC commissioning two further series for production in 2015 and 2016. The first series was nominated for a Royal Television Society Award for Best Drama Series and earned Mercurio his third nomination as Best Drama Writer by the Royal Television Society and The Writers' Guild of Great Britain. In 2014, Line of Duty was named in the Top 50 BBC2 Shows of All-Time, and named best television drama of the year by The Observer, and in 2016 ranked among the best BBC shows of all time and among the best police series of all time. In 2015, the second series won the Royal Television Society Award for Best Drama Series. and was nominated for four BAFTA Awards. Series 3 of Line of Duty became the most watched drama series broadcast on BBC2 in the multichannel era. Series 4 transferred to BBC One, consisting of six episodes broadcast from 26 March 2017.

Mercurio's third medical drama series, Critical, ran for 13 episodes on Sky1 from 24 February 2015 to predominantly positive reviews, but was cancelled on 15 July 2015 after one season.

Mercurio created and wrote Bodyguard, serving as showrunner on the six-part series starring Richard Madden and Keeley Hawes. The series began broadcasting on BBC One on 26 August 2018, achieving the highest viewing figures for a new BBC drama in the multichannel era.

=== 2020s ===
In 2021 Mercurio and Jimmy Mulville, via HTM Television, signed a first-look deal with 20th Television in an effort to expand into the US.

In 2023, HTM created the six-part drama Payback, starring Morven Christie opposite Peter Mullan, which aired on ITV and internationally. The series is written by Debbie O'Malley, and Mercurio and Mulville are credited as executive producers, along with several others. In 2025, filming took place in Canada on his series Trinity, starring Richard Madden and Gugu Mbatha-Raw.

== Honours ==
Mercurio was appointed Officer of the Order of the British Empire (OBE) in the 2021 New Year Honours for services to television drama.

== Personal life ==
Mercurio's long-time partner is Elaine Cameron, a producer and script editor, and they have two children; Jack and Molly Mercurio.

== Filmography ==
=== Television ===
Years	Title	Series	Episodes	Network	Role
1994-96	Cardiac Arrest	3	27	BBC One	Writer / Creator
1997	The Grimleys		1	ITV	
1998	Invasion: Earth	1	6	BBC	Writer
1999-2001	The Grimleys	3	22	ITV	Writer / Creator
2004-2006	Bodies	3	17	BBC Three	Writer / Creator
2010	Strike Back	1	4 (out of 6)	Sky 1	Writer
2012-2021	Line of Duty	6	36	BBC One, BBC Two	Writer / Creator
2015	Critical	1	13	Sky 1	Writer / Creator
2018	Bodyguard	1	6	BBC One	Writer / Creator
2021	Bloodlands	2	10	BBC One	Executive Producer
2021	Stephen	1	3	ITV	Executive Producer
2022	Trigger Point	2	12	ITV	Executive Producer
2022	DI Ray	2	10	ITV	Executive Producer
2023	Payback	1	6	ITV 1	Executive Producer
2024	Breathtaking	1	3	ITV X	Executive Producer
2026	Trinity	1	8	Netflix	Writer / Creator

=== TV Film ===
Year	Title	Network	Role
2004	The Legend of the Tamworth Two	BBC	Writer
2007	Frankenstein	ITV	Writer, Director
2015	Lady Chatterley's Lover	BBC One	Writer, Director

== Bibliography ==
- Bodies (2002)
- The Penguin Expedition (2003)
- Ascent (2007)
- American Adulterer (2009)
- Ascent (graphic novel – with Wesley Robins) (2011)

== Awards and nominations ==
Year	Association	Category	Result	Work(s)
1994	Writers' Guild of Great Britain Awards	Best Original Drama Serial	Nominated	Cardiac Arrest
1996	Writers' Guild of Great Britain Awards	Best Original Drama Series	Nominated	Cardiac Arrest
2003	Sheffield Children's Book Awards	Shorter Novel	Nominated	The Penguin Expedition
2004	Royal Television Society Awards	Best Drama Series	Nominated	Bodies
2004	Royal Television Society Awards	Best Drama Writer	Nominated	Bodies
2004	BAFTA Television Awards	Best Drama Series	Nominated	Bodies
2005	Royal Television Society Awards	Best Drama Series	Won	Bodies
2005	Royal Television Society Awards	Best Drama Writer	Nominated	Bodies
2005	BAFTA Television Awards	Best Drama Series	Nominated	Bodies
2012	Crime Thriller Awards	The TV Dagger	Nominated	Line of Duty
2012	Royal Television Society Midlands Awards	Best Drama/Fictional Programme	Won	Line of Duty
2013	Broadcast Awards	Best Drama Series or Serial	Nominated	Line of Duty
2013	Broadcasting Press Guild Awards	Best TV Drama	Nominated	Line of Duty
2013	South Bank Sky Arts Awards	TV Drama	Nominated	Line of Duty
2013	Royal Television Society Awards	Best Drama Series	Nominated	Line of Duty
2013	Royal Television Society Awards	Best Drama Writer	Nominated	Line of Duty
2014	Freesat Awards	Best TV Drama	Won	Line of Duty
2014	Crime Thriller Awards	The TV Dagger	Nominated	Line of Duty
2014	Writers' Guild of Great Britain Awards	TV Drama – Long Form	Nominated	Line of Duty
2015	Broadcast Awards	Best Drama Series or Serial	Nominated	Line of Duty
2015	Broadcasting Press Guild Awards	Best Drama Series	Nominated	Line of Duty
2015	Broadcasting Press Guild Awards	Best Drama Writer	Nominated	Line of Duty
2015	2015 Royal Television Society Awards	Best Drama Series	Won	Line of Duty
2015	BAFTA Television Craft Awards	Writer: Drama	Nominated	Line of Duty
2015	BAFTA Television Awards	Best Drama Series	Nominated	Line of Duty
2015	2015 South Bank Sky Arts Awards	TV Drama	Nominated	Line of Duty
2015	Royal Television Society Northern Ireland Awards	Best Drama	Won	Line of Duty
2016	TV Choice Awards	Best Drama Series	Nominated	Line of Duty
2016	Royal Television Society Northern Ireland Awards	Best Drama	Nominated	Line of Duty
2017	Broadcast Awards	Best Drama Series or Serial	Nominated	Line of Duty
2017	Broadcasting Press Guild Awards	Best TV Drama Series	Nominated	Line of Duty
2017	Royal Television Society Awards	Drama Series	Nominated	Line of Duty
2017	Royal Television Society Awards	Drama – Writer	Nominated	Line of Duty
2017	Celtic Media Festival Awards	Best Drama Series	Won	Line of Duty
2017	TV Choice Awards	Best Drama	Nominated	Line of Duty
2017	British Screenwriters' Awards	Best Crime Writing on Television	Won	Line of Duty
2017	Royal Television Society Northern Ireland Awards	Best Drama	Won	Line of Duty
2018	Writers' Guild of Great Britain Awards	TV Drama – Long Form	Nominated	Line of Duty
2018	National Television Awards	Crime Drama	Nominated	Line of Duty
2018	Irish Film and Television Academy Awards	Drama	Nominated	Line of Duty
2018	Broadcasting Press Guild Awards	Best Drama Series	Won	Line of Duty
2018	Broadcasting Press Guild Awards	Writer's Award	Won	Line of Duty
2018	Voice of the Listener & Viewer Awards for Excellence in Broadcasting	Best TV Drama Programme	Won	Line of Duty
2018	BAFTA Television Awards	Best Drama Series	Nominated	Line of Duty
2018	Televisual Bulldog Awards	Best Drama Series	Won	Line of Duty
2018	South Bank Sky Arts Awards	TV Drama	Nominated	Line of Duty
2018	Edinburgh TV Awards	Best UK Drama	Nominated	Line of Duty
2019	Golden Globe Awards	Best Television Series – Drama	Nominated	Bodyguard
2019	BAFTA Television Awards	Best Drama Series	Nominated	Bodyguard
2019	Gold Derby Awards	Best Drama Series	Nominated	Bodyguard
2019	Gold Derby Awards	Best Drama Episode of the Year	Nominated	Bodyguard
2019	Primetime Emmy Awards	Outstanding Drama Series	Nominated	Bodyguard
2019	Primetime Emmy Awards	Outstanding Writing for a Drama Series	Nominated	Bodyguard
2020	Edgar Allan Poe Award	Best Television Episode Teleplay	Won	Line of Duty
