= Cardiac Arrest (TV series) =

British television drama series (1994–1996)

- Genre: Medical drama
- Created by: Jed Mercurio (as John MacUre)
- Directed by: David Hayman; Jim Gillespie; Sam Miller; Audrey Cooke; Jo Johnson; Morag Fullerton; Peter Mullan
- Starring: Andrew Lancel; Helen Baxendale; Ace Bhatti; Jonathan Dow; Michael McKenzie; Pooky Quesnel; Jayne MacKenzie; Fred Pearson; Andrew Clover; Caroline Trowbridge; Selina Cadell; Tom Watson; Danny Webb; Peter O'Brien; Jack Fortune; Nicholas Palliser; Angela Douglas; Ellen Thomas; Melanie Hill; Jacquetta May; Gabrielle Cowburn
- Country of origin: United Kingdom
- Original language: English
- No. of series: 3
- No. of episodes: 27

Production
- Executive producers: Tony Garnett; Andrea Calderwood
- Producers: Paddy Higson; Margaret Matheson
- Cinematography: Frances Connell
- Editor: Elen Pierce Lewis
- Running time: 30 minutes
- Production company: World Productions

Original release
- Network: BBC1
- Release: 21 April 1994 – 25 June 1996

Related
- Bodies

Cardiac Arrest is a British medical drama series produced by World Productions for BBC One. It aired from 21 April 1994 to 25 June 1996. The show focused on the lives and challenges of junior doctors working in a hospital setting and was known for its realistic and sometimes dark portrayal of the medical profession. The series was controversial owing to its cynical depiction of doctors, nurses and the National Health Service (NHS), although it has often topped polls of the UK medical profession as the best medical drama of all time.

Cardiac Arrest was created by Jed Mercurio, who wrote under the pseudonym John MacUre. Mercurio is a British writer and television producer and, before pursuing a career in writing, he worked as a doctor in a hospital in Wolverhampton. His experiences as a doctor in the medical field influenced the realistic and often gritty portrayal of the medical profession in the series. Mercurio's perspective provided a visceral, albeit wryly humorous, look at the NHS in the 1990s. At the time of airing, Mercurio was still a doctor. He later went on to create another controversial medical drama for the BBC in 2004, Bodies.

== Cast ==
- Andrew Lancel as Dr Andrew Collin
- Helen Baxendale as Dr Claire Maitland
- Ace Bhatti as Dr Rajesh Rajah
- Jonathan Dow as Dr James Mortimer
- Michael MacKenzie as Dr Graham Turner
- Tom Watson as Mr Ernest Docherty, senior surgical consultant
- Ellen Thomas as Sister Jackie Landers
- Jayne MacKenzie as Staff Nurse Caroline Richards
- Katy Hale as Staff Nurse Susan Betts
- Mandy Matthews as Staff Nurse Pam Charnley
- Pooky Quesnel as Dr Monica Broome (series 1)
- Danny Webb as Mr Simon Betancourt (series 1), surgical consultant
- Melanie Hill as Sister Pamela Lockley (series 1)
- Michelle Fairley as Sister Karen Teller (series 1)
- Caroline Paterson as Staff Nurse Annie Mills (series 1)
- Ivan Heng as Staff Nurse Trevor Costello (series 1)
- Kate Hollands as Intensive Care Nurse Janice Walford (series 1)
- Gavin Mitchell as Mr Alex Legg (series 1–2), hospital administrator
- Annie Treadwell as Enrolled Nurse Becky Reece (series 1–2)
- Angela Chadfield as Enrolled Nurse Joy Makin (series 1–2)
- Joyce Falconer as Staff Nurse Tricia 'Whitecoat' Williams (series 1–2)
- Sheila Whitfield as Staff Nurse Lisa Dalton (series 1–2)
- Cassie Stuart as Staff Nurse Jayne Dugas (series 1–2)
- Terry Sue-Patt as Student Nurse Luke Harris (series 1 and 3)
- Fred Pearson as Dr Barry Yates (series 2)
- Frank Mills as Alf Grocott (series 2), hospital patient
- Nisha Nayar as Nasreen (series 2), Rajesh's girlfriend
- Nicholas Palliser as Paul Tennant (series 2–3), hospital administrator
- Peter O'Brien as Mr Cyril 'Scissors' Smedley (series 2–3), registrar
- Jack Fortune as Mr Adrian DeVries (series 2–3), surgical consultant
- Andrew Clover as Dr Phil Kirkby (series 2–3)
- Jacquetta May as Sister Julie Novac (series 2–3)
- Gabrielle Cowburn as Sister Debbie Pereira (series 2–3)
- Angela Douglas as Mrs Isobel Trimble (series 2–3), Mr Docherty's secretary and eventual wife
- Peter Biddle as Charge Nurse Patrick Garden (series 2–3
- Chris Woodger as Steven Pereira (series 2–3), son of Adrian DeVries and Debbie Pereira
- Caroline Trowbridge as Dr Liz Reid (series 3)
- Selina Cadell as Dr Sarah Hudson (series 3)
- Lisa Harkus as Student Nurse Kirsty Reilly (series 3)
- James Healey as Ken, hospital radiographer (series 3)

== Premise ==
=== Series 1 ===
Series 1 ran for six episodes between 21 April and 2 June 1994.

Dr Andrew Collin (Andrew Lancel), a junior doctor, starts his first day at work as house officer, and meets his new colleague, SHO Dr Claire Maitland (Helen Baxendale). He deals with multiple situations over the months, and is increasingly disillusioned due to the expectations placed on junior doctors. He is also required to do a three-day and night shift on call, while Claire tries to shield him from his worst abuses in order to preserve his sanity.

=== Series 2 ===
Series 2 ran for eight episodes between 19 April and 7 June 1995.

Andrew returns to the hospital and is now an SHO. To his chagrin, the consultant physician Dr Graham Turner (Michael MacKenzie) has a far better relationship with the new house officer, Dr Phil Kirkby (Andrew Clover), whose father went to school with Graham.

At the organisational level, a new hospital administrator, Paul Tennant (Nicholas Palliser), demands even more efficiency from the medical staff, which places Andrew on ENT (ear, nose and throat) duties even though he has no training for the skills required. Tennant also instructs Claire to abandon resuscitation of a hypothermia patient in order to fulfil her clinic duties.

While Claire is covering for Andrew one night in casualty, a haemophiliac man is brought in with a nosebleed. Since Claire is not trained in ENT, she is unable to stop the bleeding, which leads the man to bleed to death. Claire exposes the systemic failures to the media, but she is fired on an unrelated technicality.

The hospital soon attracts additional adverse publicity when the anaesthetist Dr James Mortimer (Jo Dow) is diagnosed with HIV, following a discovery that he has a Kaposi's sarcoma, but he is still permitted to work. The diagnosis is leaked to the media and a scandal ensues, and manager Paul Tennant (Nicholas Palliser) pressures James to take a leave of absence.

Meanwhile, Phil is attempting to draw up chemotherapy doses for a patient during Christmas Day despite having no experience. He rings a drunken Dr Turner, who is the only one available. He advises Phil to draw up the treatment, but he gets the dose wrong and the patient dies of anaphylactic shock. He takes the full blame and denies that he sought Turner's opinion, but the inquest returns a finding of unlawful killing.

=== Series 3 ===
Series 3 ran for thirteen episodes between 2 April 1996 and 25 June 1996.

The hospital has another new house officer, Dr Liz Reid (Caroline Trowbridge), who is constant trouble and Claire (who is now rehired as a registrar) shows little respect for her. Their new boss, medical consultant Dr Sarah Hudson (Selina Cadell), reprimands Claire for frightening Liz, but Hudson also confronts her over the latter's habit of blaming her own mistakes on colleagues. Claire describes Liz as "mad" and breaks her pager in a fit of rage.

Meanwhile, Turner's position becomes less secure. Dr Hudson assures Claire that Turner's neglect of his duties has not gone unnoticed. Soon an audit into consultants' attendance begins, but the junior doctors quickly realise Turner was forewarned. When he advises Andrew to attempt the insertion of a temporary pacemaker, Andrew calls Claire in, who is off duty and slightly drunk. Due to Turner's negligence, Tennant cautions Turner about his approach to his duties.

Phil, now a surgical house officer, faces continual taunting from his new boss Mr Adrian DeVries (Jack Fortune). He begins to aggressively suggest to Turner that he should be the one facing manslaughter charges over the chemotherapy death. Phil confesses to Docherty and he brokers a deal in which records of the accident are lost so Phil cannot be charged, in return for Turner being removed as head of the committee.

Public scandals continue at the hospital, which puts pressure on James to resign. Sister Jackie Landers (Ellen Thomas) speaks on television about a patient and is severely reprimanded by Tennant, but Sister Julie Novac (Jacquetta May) makes similar comments to other reporters, which leads Tennant to become suspended over her remarks.

After Tennant is reinstated, he attempts to have Julie's new partner, Scissors Smedley, fired over procedural errors he committed when asking a student nurse to administer medication to a critically ill child. When Julie finds out that Scissors had not told her about Tennant's manipulations, she breaks up with him.

James's HIV infection affects Andrew, who had begun an affair with staff nurse Caroline Richards (Jayne MacKenzie): her ex-lover Luke (Terry Sue-Patt) was also a partner of James, and Luke had tested positive for HIV, putting Caroline at risk. She eventually reveals to him that she is pregnant.

Adrian DeVries's son, Steven (Christopher Woodger), the result of a past relationship with Sister Debbie Pereira (Gabrielle Cowburn), is brought in seriously injured after being hit by a car. DeVries and his team attempt to save Steven's life, but fail to do so, leaving DeVries in tears.

In the series finale, Liz is in a psychiatric ward following a breakdown, with another patient murdering patients by drug overdose. He forces his way into Liz's room when Andrew visits her, and stabs Andrew with a needle containing insulin. Andrew is rescued by the casualty team, including newly reunited Claire and Scissors, and they head towards the resuscitation room, ending the series.

== Themes ==
Although billed as a comedy, and darkly humorous in many respects, Cardiac Arrest explores several disturbing themes. It demolishes many cherished concepts of healthcare one after the other, and did not attempt to be politically correct. It attracted complaints from many quarters during its airing, although enjoyed huge support amongst junior doctors.

=== Racism ===
Andrew: "Mrs Singh doesn't speak any English."
Claire: "Then screw her. I'm not a frigging vet." (smiles at Mrs Singh and exits)

Cardiac Arrest is stark in its portrayal of racist attitudes, which are depicted as endemic throughout the health service. In one episode, an Indian locum who is clearly incompetent is assumed to be so, not because of his deeds, but because he is Indian. In Series 3, Raj is not chosen for a surgical rotation on the GP training scheme to Docherty's surprise: DeVries calmly reveals that doctors with "foreign" names are never chosen.

Raj is often shown arguing with his mother on the telephone about her desire for him to get married.

=== Sexism ===
Female patients and staff are portrayed as subject to continual sexual harassment. Raj and James – who is actually a bisexual man with many male partners – have a "babe alert" system whereby they page other male doctors to come and ogle attractive female patients admitted to casualty. When Claire suggests to a female nurse that she would support a sexual harassment case that the nurse could make against James, the nurse replies that she would lose her job over it.

=== Homophobia ===
When the media reveals that James is HIV positive, Raj is sympathetic and unsurprised by the revelation of James' sexuality, saying merely that he assumes James acquired HIV via "unprotected sex with an infected woman... or man." He then goes on to explain that he has known for some time and knows that James had to be secretive given the pervasive homophobia of the medical system and community. James is later falsely accused of child abuse after a man who recognised him from media coverage of his infection sees him feeling for a pulse in his son's leg. The father is openly and aggressively homophobic.

=== Junior doctors ===
In an early scene, we see several junior doctors smoking in the doctors' office, and Claire commenting that soon someone will say it gives you cancer. This is just one scene where doctors are depicted as acting very far from their cherished public persona.

Andrew is rapidly seen as being the most put-upon person in the hospital. Nurses will not flush venous lines: Andrew must do it. Porters will not transport blood specimens: Andrew must do it. Every menial job seems to default to him, and he rapidly runs out of patience. After three days of continuous duty, Andrew is speaking to a patient's family, breaking bad news. One male relative stands up to Andrew in a threatening manner and says "What sort of doctor are you? You couldn't even be bothered to shave before you came to work today!"

=== Consultants ===
Consultants are mostly portrayed as callous and uncaring towards matters of patients and their own staff such as junior doctors, nurses and house officers.

Andrew's consultant, Dr Turner, at first seems friendly and approachable. However, he never appears on the ward, leaving the treatment of patients to Claire. We see him chatting on the telephone about his golf fixtures. Later he attempts to persuade an exhausted and desperate Andrew to forgo his holiday, bribing him with a good reference for his next job. Finally, he attempts to have Phil take the blame for a medical error that kills a patient.

Both of the younger surgical consultants, Betancourt and DeVries, are portrayed as aggressive bullies.

The more positive portrayals of consultants are with the portrayals of Dr Yates, Dr Hudson and Mr Docherty, the last being the most notable example of all. Early in the first series Mr Docherty is portrayed as pleasant and cheerful, but also bumbling and incompetent, frequently requiring to be rescued by Monica. He often loses his way in the middle of a sentence. His characterisation changes slowly as the series progresses, to the point of Mr Docherty's becoming the most notable senior doctor of the programme. Dr Yates is portrayed as a sympathetic character who, in stark contrast to Turner, genuinely supports his juniors and stays behind to assist them, and more than once is vocal in his opposition to management's tendency to look for a scapegoat for patient deaths caused by systemic flaws. Dr Hudson is portrayed as a no-nonsense yet scrupulously fair character.

=== Managers ===
Managers are portrayed with considerable venom. The Series 1 hospital manager is uncaring and dismissive, even of Andrew's most desperate complaints of abuse:

Manager: "Your contract states that in emergencies you are expected to come to work."
Andrew: "I fail to see how a holiday I booked six weeks ago can be called an emergency!"
Manager: "Hospital managers are accustomed to the disaffection of junior medical staff."

In Series 2 and 3, Tennant is primarily interested in protecting his own job, and that of his ally Dr Turner, and in improving hospital metrics such as outpatient waiting times, rather than improving working conditions for staff, or care for patients.

=== Nurses ===
In Series 1, nurses attract perhaps the cruellest depiction of all. They are frequently shown as gossiping, conniving women, chatting at the nurses' station while ill patients languish without attention, or Andrew fumbles around, hopelessly busy and in great need of assistance.

In Series 2 and 3 senior nurses become participants in storylines and are treated with less caricature and portrayed more positively. One of these is Charge Nurse Patrick "Hanging" Garden (Peter Biddle), although he has his moments of being portrayed negatively, especially during the second series, where he is one of the most unsympathetic towards James and opines that the latter should be sacked.

Many nurses have suggestive nicknames, such as "Nurse White-Coat" (Joyce Falconer), so called because she would apparently sleep with "anyone in a white coat".

=== Medical ethos ===
In common with other medical dramas, such as The House of God or even M*A*S*H, Cardiac Arrest portrays junior hospital medicine as an unending parade of sexual adventure for the staff, partly because longer-term relationships are placed under enormous stress by their working hours. Few characters are in stable relationships. In the first series, among the junior doctors, only Monica is married. Later, even this relationship breaks down, and Monica eventually takes her own life. By the second series, Andrew is married but shortly begins an affair with his old girlfriend Caroline. Claire has relationships with several of the surgeons: Simon Betancourt and Adrian DeVries, who were both married.

=== Training ===
The series is extremely critical of medical training. Claire and Mr Docherty, both sympathetic characters, repeatedly discuss in detail that medical training is unduly demanding of junior doctors and that both the knowledge and training needed are increasing without recognition or appropriate supervision. At the end of the first series Docherty directly addresses the question of hazing practices in medical training when Betancourt tries to defend his treatment of Monica by saying that he went through a similar process.

Junior medicine is portrayed as a school of hard knocks, where junior doctors achieve success and skill over the corpses of their mistakes. They achieve promotions and status by underhand means. No-one is supportive to anyone else's problems.

== Production ==
Cardiac Arrest was produced by Island World. It had envisaged creating a sitcom set in a hospital, but when Jed Mecurio responded to its advertisement for a writer the show became a portrait of the NHS from the perspective of junior doctors. Series 1 and 2 were filmed on location at both Ruchill Hospital and Stobhill Hospital in Glasgow.

Mercurio appears briefly in a cameo role in series 2 as a man who does not know who he is, and in series 3 as a ringer brought in to supplement the junior doctors in a cricket match. Mercurio is also visible in the final episode, celebrating Mr Docherty's marriage. Mercurio served as technical medical adviser on the second series (and then 'production consultant' for the final series), which gave him much more access to the hands-on process of production, and which he cites as his apprenticeship in producing/directing.

== Episodes ==
=== Series overview ===
Series	Episodes	Originally released	
Series	Episodes	First released	Last released
1	6	21 April 1994	2 June 1994
2	8	19 April 1995	7 June 1995
3	13	2 April 1996	25 June 1996

=== Series 1 (1994) ===
No. overall	No. in series	Title	Directed by	Written by	Original release date
1	1	"Welcome to the House of Pain"	David Hayman	Jed Mercurio	21 April 1994
Thrown in at the deep end and expected to fend for himself, Dr Collin is assigned to Crippen Ward. Dr Maitland has become hardened and can only forewarn him of the perils. An attempt to help an emphysema patient ends in death.
2	2	"Doctors & Nurses"	David Hayman	Jed Mercurio	28 April 1994
Mr Betancourt is on the rampage and the doctors are run off their feet. Raj discovers that Mengele Ward has been closed due to MRSA and has a cunning plan. Claire gets revenge on Dr Mortimer when his hi-jinks is really a sexually assault.
3	3	"The Killing Season"	David Hayman	Jed Mercurio	5 May 1994
August is the killing season, as it is when new doctors hit the wards and hospital mortality rates hit sky high. While some doctors and nurses can let their hair down at an hospital ball, surgeon Dr Broome's career is starting to tail spin.
4	4	"You Can't Make an Omelette.... Without Breaking Legs"	David Hayman	Jed Mercurio	19 May 1994
Mr Ernest Docherty steps in to help Dr Broome get some study time. Andrew gets involved with Nurse Richards. Raj suspects locum Dr Patel is a fraud but Hospital Manager Mr Legg wants to cover up that the real Patel is a woman.
5	5	"Turning Out the Light"	David Hayman	Jed Mercurio	26 May 1994
Judith Edwards catches Raj's eye, so he takes an extra interest in the treatment of her father, Ronald, but gets caught out in a nurses' wind-up. Manager Alex Legg increases Andrew's hours but finds he needs him when brought to casualty.
6	6	"The Edge"	David Hayman	Jed Mercurio	2 June 1994
Failing her exams, Dr Monica Broome is on the brink and goes to her room to take her own life. With his holiday blocked by Dr Turner, Andrew ends a patient's suffering with an overdose. Claire realises it is technically murder and covers it up.

=== Series 2 (1995) ===
No. overall	No. in series	Title	Directed by	Written by	Original release date
7	1	"Shallow End"	Jim Gillespie	Jed Mercurio	19 April 1995
Australian doctor Mr Cyril 'Scissors' Smedley has his first day as Mr Docherty's new registrar. The new hospital manager, Paul Tennant, decides to inspect the hospital by using a wheelchair and is prepared to play politics with Dr Turner.
8	2	"A Cold Heart"	Jim Gillespie	Jed Mercurio	26 April 1995
Hospital manager Paul Tennant starts to make budget cuts to front-line services. Unable to cover ENT, Dr Turner offers up Andrew over Claire, fearing she would quit first. Claire and James battle to stop a patient dying of hypothermia.
9	3	"The Comfort of Strangers"	Jim Gillespie	Jed Mercurio	3 May 1995
Heather Parsons comes into casualty with a serious case of meningitis after her GP, Dr Wilson, sent her home. When she dies, Andrew is blamed by her parents. He wants Wilson to be accountable but it could cost him his career.
10	4	"Bad Blood"	Jim Gillespie	Jed Mercurio	10 May 1995
Dr Phil Kirkby is accused of sexually assaulting a patient. She attempts to blackmail him into giving her drugs in return for silence. Nurse Richards gets suspended when patient Mrs Mansfield dies after her oxygen is wrongly turned up too high.
11	5	"Factor 8"	Sam Miller	Jed Mercurio	17 May 1995
A patient of Dr Turner, 28-year-old James Parker, dies suddenly overnight. Hospital manager Paul Tennant is looking for someone to blame. Senior nurse Pam Charnley has never disclosed a mental illness and was also on duty when Mrs Manfield died.
12	6	"The Critical Hour"	Sam Miller	Jed Mercurio	24 May 1995
Mr DeVries takes action to save a seriously injured child. Claire faces suspension when she angers management by attempting to highlight untrained doctors covering ENT. Paul Tennant hires a PR team to raise the hospital's profile.
13	7	"Running on Vapours"	Sam Miller	Jed Mercurio	31 May 1995
James discovers that he has AIDS. When the story leaks to the press, Paul Tennant expects him to take leave but other colleagues want him out. Adrian DeVries tells Debbie he wants access to Steven, whom he believes to be his son.
14	8	"The Betrayed"	Sam Miller	Jed Mercurio	7 June 1995
James Mortimer's career is in the balance when the hospital attempts to terminate his contract owing to his HIV status. Phil Kirkby refuses to plead guilty to negligence at the inquest into the McIntyre case, but is still found guilty of unlawful killing.

=== Series 3 (1996) ===
No. overall	No. in series	Title	Directed by	Written by	Original release date
15	1	"The Body Electric"	Audrey Cooke	Jed Mercurio	2 April 1996
A vagrant decides to smoke while on oxygen and blows up part of an hospital wing. Dr Liz Reid attempts to get by on her good looks but turns everybody against her. Claire has to persuade a young wife to donate her husband's organs.
16	2	"Open and Shut"	Audrey Cooke	Jed Mercurio	9 April 1996
James Mortimer's illness causes the hospital to contact patients with whom he has had contact. Patient Linda Hawkins has a reputation of crying foul when her husband leaves her, but now discovers she has an aggressive form of cancer.
17	3	"The Practice of Privacy"	Audrey Cooke	Jed Mercurio	16 April 1996
Dr Turner is too busy with private practice, so Andrew is forced to put in his first pacemaker. James decides to give a newspaper interview. After Luke Norris's confession that he is HIV positive, Caroline has to get up the nerve to tell Andrew.
18	4	"The Red Queen"	Audrey Cooke	Jed Mercurio	23 April 1996
With Claire on administrative duties, Andrew is the only senior doctor in casualty. Dr Liz Reid is out of her depth and can't be found. Hospital manager Paul Tennant finally gets the chance to see what really happens at the sharp end.
19	5	"Trench Warfare"	Jo Johnson	Jed Mercurio	30 April 1996
Sister Landers appears on a television debate about the NHS and is later escorted from the hospital building. Julie speaks to a reporter in her defence and finds herself in front of ex-husband Paul Tennant for giving a tetanus injection.
20	6	"Suffer Little Children"	Jo Johnson	Jed Mercurio	7 May 1996
As Dr Phil Kirkby's trial for manslaughter approaches, and the pressure starts to mount while Dr Turner becomes more intransigent, Raj is desperate to play in the hospital cricket match but gets drawn into the case of baby Hayley.
21	7	"The Glass Ceiling"	Jo Johnson	Jed Mercurio	14 May 1996
Claire has grown tired of Liz's laziness and doesn't care who knows it. Dr Sarah Hudson convinces Claire that her attitude could affect her long-term future. Prison hard man Terry Binns goes to extreme lengths to stay in hospital.
22	8	"The Way of All Flesh"	Morag Fullarton	Jed Mercurio	21 May 1996
Adrian DeVries's wife discovers his affair with Claire and throws him out, forcing him to move into an on-call room. An opportunity arises for Claire's dialysis patient to get a new kidney, but the donor's husband needs to be convinced to consent to the harvest.
23	9	"The Age of Consent"	Morag Fullarton	Jed Mercurio	28 May 1996
Mr Docherty starts to question Paul Tennant's intimidating management style. When a homophobic father accuses James of inappropriately touching a young boy, Tennant forces out the only witness before Mr Docherty exposes the lies.
24	10	"The Holy Triad"	Morag Fullarton	Jed Mercurio	4 June 1996
Tennant pressures student nurse Kirsty to sell out Scissors following the death of a little child in casualty. Liz complains to Dr Turner about the way she is treated. DeVries threatens to take Debbie to court to get access to his son.
25	11	"The Oedipus Effect"	Peter Mullan	Jed Mercurio	11 June 1996
Claire's dialysis patient is brought in as an emergency, but his survival options are running out. Julie discovers Tennant intends to terminate Scissors' contract. Liz is finally caught out when she tries to blame Rob for her error.
26	12	"Breaking Strain"	Peter Mullan	Jed Mercurio	18 June 1996
Liz has to be dragged from the ward after verbally assaulting a patient, but is close to a mental breakdown. Paul Tennant makes it clear to Julie that Scissors' future at the hospital was down to her ending their relationship.
27	13	"Death Us Do Part"	Peter Mullan	Jed Mercurio	25 June 1996
The episode starts with a suspicious-looking doctor conducting rounds at the hospital. Mr Docherty is marrying his secretary the following day and the staff hold a surprise party for him. Caroline is vomiting, and suspicions are confirmed when she later tells Andrew that she is pregnant. Raj's father has had a heart attack and is being treated at the hospital. Dr Mortimer is diagnosed with pneumonia, which is concerning, given his HIV-positive status. Scissors and Claire get back together. In the final scenes, Andrew visits Liz Reid, the former house officer who has previously suffered a mental breakdown, in the medical staff quarters. Someone knocks on the door and says he's a diabetic requiring assistance. Andrew opens the door and the patient stabs him with a needle containing insulin. Meanwhile, Raj realises who the maniac patient is and arrives shortly afterwards, attempting to subdue him. Claire, Scissors, James and Raj attempt to treat Andrew whose life is clearly in great danger. The episode and the series end on a cliffhanger.

== Reception ==
The critical response to the series was generally positive; it was twice nominated for Best Original TV Drama Series/Serial by the Writers' Guild of Great Britain and twice in the same category by BAFTA Scotland.

Doctors were reported as finding the series to be representative of life in an NHS hospital. In a 1999 survey of British doctors' attitude to television depiction of their profession, 15% of doctors voted for Claire Maitland as the fictional doctor they would most like to be compared with. When the series had not yet been released on DVD, an online forum for doctors ran a campaign for its release. The Royal College of Nursing, however, complained that it portrayed nurses as witless and callous. Virginia Bottomley, the Health Secretary at the time of airing, described it as closer to a Carry On film than a drama. During the height of the controversy Jed Mercurio wrote a letter to the newsletter accompanying the British Medical Journal claiming that most of his criticism came from "retired old consultants", but says he has since decided that much of the controversy was a media creation.

Notably, the series originated the medical term "killing season" for the supposed association between newly qualified doctors starting hospital practice and an increase in medical errors and mortality, which data do not support. In 1994, the British Medical Journal concluded that, "newly qualified house officers have been falsely accused of increasing the number of deaths in hospital and that the idea of the killing season is very much fiction." A 2009 Imperial College London study of records for 300,000 patients at 170 hospitals in the years between 2000 and 2008 found that death rates were 6% higher on Black Wednesday than the previous Wednesday.

== Media ==
The complete series was released as a five-disc DVD set, Cardiac Arrest: The Complete Collection, on 16 April 2007. The DVD contains all three series, but no extras such as commentary. In September 2023, the complete series was repeated over three weeks on BBC Four and made available on BBC iPlayer, together with an interview with Mercurio about the series.
