= London Screenwriters' Festival =

Annual festival

- Location: Regent's University London, United Kingdom
- Language: English
- Website: http://www.londonscreenwritersfestival.com

The London Screenwriters' Festival is an annual writers' and film makers' festival held in London, England, since 2010. The festival offers workshops, seminars, lectures, screenplay competitions and the opportunity to pitch projects to a number of agencies, Film and Television Producers and Studios from both the United Kingdom and Hollywood.

== History ==
The London Screenwriters’ Festival was launched in 2010 by Chris Jones, filmmaker and author of The Guerilla Filmmakers Handbook. The event is held over the last weekend of October every year, attracting around 150 speakers and 600 delegates. Since its launch in 2010 it has been held at Regent's University London.

The festival is owned and operated by London Creative Festivals Ltd whose offices are at Ealing Studios in West London.

Pitching has always played a big part of the Screenwriters’ Festival, and in 2012, the founders of The Great American Pitchfest (Bob Schultz and Sign Olynyk) worked with the London Screenwriters' Festival to create the Great British Pitchfest.

== Speakers ==
The Speakers of 2010 included over 80 speakers from a wide array of professions including David Hare, Joe Eszterhas and Nick Hornby, along with other producers, writers, agent, executives, educators and directors.

== Competitions ==
=== 2010 Green Light Award ===
- Winner - Laurence Timms for his script The Dead Office
- 2nd Place - Henry Fosdike for his script The Decision
- 3rd Place - Charlie Boddington for his script It's Not Easy

=== 2010 'Inspired by Science' Treatment Award ===
- Winner - Rachel Matthews

=== 2011 'Four Nights In August' ===
- Winner- Dave Turner with Everything You Need
- Winner- Milethia Thomas with Why
- Winner- Anil Rao with Why

===2012 '50 Kisses'===

- Winner- Kristy McConnell with Enough

=== British Screenwriters’ Awards ===
The British Screenwriters’ Awards were launched in 2014.
