= Tokuyoshi Kawashima =

Japanese voice actor (born 1973)

- 川島 得愛
- Born: February 8, 1973 (age 53); Tokyo, Japan
- Occupation: Voice actor
- Years active: 1996–present

Tokuyoshi Kawashima (川島 得愛, Kawashima Tokuyoshi; born February 8, 1973 in Tokyo, Japan) is a Japanese voice actor affiliated with 81 Produce.

== Voice roles ==
=== Anime television ===
- Noir (2001) – Heinz
- Kurau Phantom Memory (2004) – Mike
- Madlax (2004) – Charlie
- Monkey Turn (2004) – Kenji Hatano
- Rockman.EXE Stream (2004) – Yuichiro Hikari
- Emma - A Victorian Romance (2005) – Willam Jones
- Gakuen Alice (2005) – Subaru Imai
- Honey and Clover (2005) – Matsumoto Ippei (ep 12-13)
- Naruto (2005) – Jibachi Kamizuru
- Rockman.EXE Beast (2005) – Yuichiro Hikari, Zoano Numberman
- D.Gray-man (2006) – Mark (ep 1)
- Ghost Slayers Ayashi (2006) – Houzaburo Ogasawara
- Hataraki Man (2006) – Furukawa (ep 8)
- Saru Get You -On Air- (2006) – Ukki Blue
- Rockman.EXE Beast+ (2006) – Yuichiro Hikari, Zero One
- El Cazador de la Bruja (2007) – Pedro
- Oh! Edo Rocket (2007) – Akai Nishinosuke
- Shooting Star Rockman – Wolf
- Blade of the Immortal (2008) – Takayoshi Asano
- Mobile Suit Gundam 00 (2008) – Klaus Grad
- RIN ~Daughters of Mnemosyne~ (2008) – Kei Tajima
- Sands of Destruction (2008) – Morte's father
- Corpse Princess: Aka (2008) – Takamasa Sogi
- Corpse Princess: Kuro (2009) – Takamasa Sogi
- Guin Saga (2009) – Deelan
- Katanagatari (2010) – Takahito Hida
- Pokémon (2010) – Hawes
- Psychic Detective Yakumo (2010) – Yuutarou Ishii
- Hunter × Hunter (Second Series) (2012) – Kastro
- Mysterious Girlfriend X (2012) – Hiroyuki Tsubaki
- Shirokuma Cafe (2012) – Rintaro Hayashi
- Sword Art Online (2012) – Kains
- Pokémon Origins (2013) – Wataru (Lance)
- Silver Spoon (2013) – Mr. Shiroishi
- Concrete Revolutio (2015) – Hyōma Yoshimura
- JoJo's Bizarre Adventure: Diamond Is Unbreakable (2016) – Tonio Trussardi
- My Hero Academia (2016) – Naomasa Tsukauchi
- Gabriel DropOut (2017) – Satania's Father
- Dragon Quest: The Adventure of Dai (2021) – Block
- Moriarty the Patriot (2021) – Zach Patterson
- Migi & Dali (2023) – Akira Ichijō
- One Piece (2024) – Vegapunk Pythagoras
- Tonari no Yōkai-san (2024) – Chiaki Nishiya (Wagen)
- My Hero Academia: Vigilantes (2025) – Naomasa Tsukauchi

Unknown date

- Fullmetal Alchemist: Brotherhood (????) – Riddle
- Major (????) – Takeshi Saotome
- Saint Seiya Omega (????) – Equuleus Kitalpha
- Saiyuki (????) – Purple Demon
- Saiyuki Gunlock (????) – Doshi
- Tsubasa: Reservoir Chronicle (????) – Fujitaka (Syaoran's father)
- Tsubasa Tokyo Revelations (????) – Yuto
- Wangan Midnight (????) – Koichiro Aizawa and Masaki
- Zatch Bell! (????) – Galliont

=== Theatrical animation ===
- Pokémon: The Movie 2000 (1999) – Kamex
- Ah! My Goddess: The Movie (2000) – Miwa
- Rockman.EXE: Hikari to Yami no Program (2005) – Yuichiro Hikari
- Tamagotchi: The Movie (2007) – Papamametchi
- Un-Go: Episode 0 (2011) – Makiro Serada
- Lu over the Wall (2017) – Fuguda
- Detective Conan: Zero the Enforcer (2018) – Makoto Kusakabe

=== Video games ===
- Tactics Ogre: Reborn (2022) – Hektor Didarro

=== Dubbing ===
==== Live-action ====
- James Van Der Beek
  - Dawson's Creek – Dawson Leery
  - Varsity Blues – Jonathon "Mox" Moxon
  - Jay and Silent Bob Strike Back – James Van Der Beek
  - Medium – Dylan Hoyt (episode "All in the Family")
  - The Rules of Attraction – Sean Bateman
- The 39 Steps – Richard Hannay (Rupert Penry-Jones)
- The Aftermath – Stefan Lubert (Alexander Skarsgård)
- Almost Human – Dorian (Michael Ealy)
- American Pie Presents: Band Camp – Matthew "Matt" Stifler (Tad Hilgenbrink)
- American Pie Presents: The Naked Mile – Erik Stifler (John White)
- Anywhere but Here – Benny (Shawn Hatosy)
- Around the World in 80 Days (2008 TV Tokyo edition) – Bak Mei (Daniel Wu)
- Aquamarine – Raymond (Jake McDorman)
- Ballistic: Ecks vs. Sever – Agent Harry Lee (Terry Chen)
- Band of Brothers – Sergeant Warren "Skip" Muck (Richard Speight Jr.)
- The Beach – Étienne (Guillaume Canet)
- The Big Bounce – Jack Ryan (Owen Wilson)
- Black Panther: Wakanda Forever – Griot (Trevor Noah)
- Blackout – Tommy
- The Book Thief – Max Vanderburg (Ben Schnetzer)
- The Break-Up Artist – Mike (Ryan Kennedy)
- Brideshead Revisited – Charles Ryder (Matthew Goode)
- Bride Wars – Nathan "Nate" Lerner (Bryan Greenberg)
- A Bridge Too Far – Major Julian Cook (Robert Redford)
- Bring It On: All or Nothing – Brad Warner (Jake McDorman)
- The Captive – Det. Jeffrey Cornwall (Scott Speedman)
- Chappie – Chappie (Sharlto Copley)
- Chasing Papi – Tomás "Papi" Fuentes (Eduardo Verástegui)
- Chicago Med – Dr. Connor Rhodes (Colin Donnell)
- Children of Men – Patric (Charlie Hunnam)
- City by the Sea – Joey LaMarca (James Franco)
- The Claim – Donald Dalglish (Wes Bentley)
- Coma – Dr. Mark Bellows (Steven Pasquale)
- The Company You Keep – Ben Shepard (Shia LaBeouf)
- The Crow: Salvation – Alex Corvis/The Crow (Eric Mabius)
- The Crown – Prince Philip, Duke of Edinburgh (Matt Smith)
- Darkness – Carlos (Fele Martínez)
- Daylight – Vincent (Sage Stallone)
- Death on the Nile – Linus Windlesham (Russell Brand)
- Devil's Pass – Jensen Day (Matt Stokoe)
- The Diary of a Teenage Girl – Monroe Rutherford (Alexander Skarsgård)
- Dirt – Leo Spiller (Will McCormack)
- District 9 – Wikus van der Merwe (Sharlto Copley)
- Doctor Who – The Eleventh Doctor (Matt Smith)
- Driven – Jimmy Bly (Kip Pardue)
- El tiempo entre costuras – Marcus Logan (Peter Vives)
- En liten julsaga – Jakob (Jesper Salén)
- Endless Love – David Elliot (Alex Pettyfer)
- Eternal Sunshine of the Spotless Mind – Stan Fink (Mark Ruffalo)
- EuroTrip – Cooper Harris (Jacob Pitts)
- Everwood – Colin Hart (Mike Erwin)
- Failure to Launch – Philip "Ace" (Justin Bartha)
- Fast & Furious 6 – Han Seoul-Oh (Sung Kang)
- F9 – Han Lue (Sung Kang)
- Fast X – Han Lue (Sung Kang)
- Fight Club – Angel Face (Jared Leto)
- Fleming: The Man Who Would Be Bond – Ian Fleming (Dominic Cooper)
- Flyboys – William Jensen (Philip Winchester)
- The Forsaken – Sean (Kerr Smith)
- The Four Feathers – Tom Willoughby (Rupert Penry-Jones)
- Futuresport – Akira Otomo (Hiro Kanagawa)
- Gia – T.J. (Eric Michael Cole)
- Godmothered – Hugh (Santiago Cabrera)
- The Good Doctor – Dr. Neil Melendez (Nicholas Gonzalez)
- Gormenghast – Steerpike (Jonathan Rhys Meyers)
- Gran Torino – Father Janovich (Christopher Carley)
- Green Lantern – Dr. Hector Hammond (Peter Sarsgaard)
- Harry's Law – Adam Branch (Nate Corddry)
- Harry Potter and the Philosopher's Stone – Oliver Wood (Sean Biggerstaff)
- Harry Potter and the Chamber of Secrets – Oliver Wood (Sean Biggerstaff)
- Harry Potter and the Deathly Hallows – Part 2 – Oliver Wood (Sean Biggerstaff)
- The Hole – Martyn Taylor (Daniel Brocklebank)
- The Hollars – Ron Hollar (Sharlto Copley)
- Hot Rod – Dave McLean (Bill Hader)
- House of the Dead – Rudy Curien (Jonathan Cherry)
- How Do You Know – Matty Reynolds (Owen Wilson)
- I Love You, Man – Peter Klaven (Paul Rudd)
- Initial D Live Action - Takeshi Nakazato (Shawn Yue)
- Insomnia – Randy Stetz (Jonathan Jackson)
- The Intern – Matt Ostin (Anders Holm)
- Into the Blue 2: The Reef – Carlton (David Anders)
- Ip Man – Li Chiu (Gordon Lam)
- Jersey Boys – Frankie Valli (John Lloyd Young)
- Jersey Girl – Arthur Brickman (Jason Biggs)
- John Tucker Must Die – John Tucker (Jesse Metcalfe)
- Julie & Julia – Eric Powell (Chris Messina)
- Just Married – Peter Prentiss (Christian Kane)
- K-19: The Widowmaker – Lieutenant Vadim Radtchenko (Peter Sarsgaard)
- Lara Croft: Tomb Raider – Mr. Pimms (Julian Rhind-Tutt)
- Last Days – Luke (Lukas Haas)
- LAX – Nick (David Paetkau)
- Legally Blonde – Warner Huntington III (Matthew Davis)
- Logan – Caliban (Stephen Merchant)
- Loser – Chris (Thomas Sadoski)
- Love & Other Drugs – Trey Hannigan (Gabriel Macht)
- Malignant – Detective Kekoa Shaw (George Young)
- Mars Attacks! – Richie Norris (Lukas Haas)
- The Matrix – FedEx Man
- The Meg – James "Mac" Mackreides (Cliff Curtis)
- Meg 2: The Trench – James "Mac" Mackreides (Cliff Curtis)
- Meteor Storm – Kyle Kembler (Eric Johnson)
- The Midnight After – Shun (Chui Tien-you)
- Miss March – Eugene Bell (Zach Cregger)
- The Mists of Avalon – Mordred (Hans Matheson)
- Mrs Dalloway – Septimus Warren Smith (Rupert Graves)
- The Musketeer – d'Artagnan (Justin Chambers)
- My Lovely Sam Soon – Min Hyun-woo (Lee Kyu-han)
- Narcos – César Gaviria (Raúl Méndez)
- Needful Things – Deputy Norris Ridgewick (Ray McKinnon)
- Odyssey 5 – Neil Taggart (Christopher Gorham)
- The Pacific – Capt. Andrew Haldane (Scott Gibson)
- Patient Zero – Morgan (Matt Smith)
- The Patriot – Gabriel Martin (Heath Ledger)
- Penelope – Edward Humphrey Vanderman III (Simon Woods)
- Penny Dreadful – Victor Frankenstein (Harry Treadaway)
- The Pillars of the Earth – Richard (Sam Claflin)
- Platoon (2003 TV Tokyo edition) – Lerner (Johnny Depp)
- Pride and Prejudice and Zombies – George Wickham (Jack Huston)
- The Purifiers – Sol (Dominic Monaghan)
- Red – William Cooper (Karl Urban)
- Road Trip – Rubin Carver (Paulo Costanzo)
- Rock Star – Chris "Izzy" Cole (Mark Wahlberg)
- Romeo Must Die – Colin O'Day (D. B. Woodside)
- Scary Movie – Bobby Prinze (Jon Abrahams)
- Small Soldiers – Brad (Jonathan Bouck)
- So Close – Yen (Song Seung-heon)
- Steve Jobs – Steve Jobs (Michael Fassbender)
- Stealth – EDI (Wentworth Miller)
- Stop-Loss – SGT Steve Shriver (Channing Tatum)
- Superbad – Officer Slater (Bill Hader)
- Superman Returns – Jimmy Olsen (Sam Huntington)
- Supernatural – Henry Winchester (Gil McKinney)
- Surrogates – Dr. Lionel Canter (James Cromwell)
- Tempo – Jack Ganzer (Hugh Dancy)
- The Terminal – Enrique Cruz (Diego Luna)
- Thelma & Louise – J.D. (Brad Pitt)
- Third Star – Davy (Tom Burke)
- Tuck Everlasting – Jesse Tuck (Jonathan Jackson)
- The Twilight Zone – Raff Hanks (John Cho)
- The Virgin Suicides – Trip Fontaine (Josh Hartnett)
- The Vow – Leo Collins (Channing Tatum)
- When in Rome – Gale (Dax Shepard)
- Wild – Greg (Kevin Rankin)
- X2 – John Allerdyce/Pyro (Aaron Stanford)
- X-Men: The Last Stand – John Allerdyce/Pyro (Aaron Stanford)
- Zodiac – Robert Graysmith (Jake Gyllenhaal)

==== Animation ====
- Batman Beyond – Terry McGinnis/Batman
- Batman Beyond: Return of the Joker – Terry McGinnis/Batman
- Big Hero 6 – Baymax
- Bionicle 2: Legends of Metru Nui – Nuju
- Isle of Dogs – Rex
- Justice League Unlimited – Terry McGinnis/Batman
- Love, Death & Robots – Torrin
- Missing Link – Mr. Susan Link
- Peppa Pig – Narrator
- Static Shock – Terry McGinnis/Batman
- Teenage Mutant Ninja Turtles – Casey Jones
- The Zeta Project – Terry McGinnis/Batman
- Thomas & Friends – Stafford and Rusty (succeeding Rusty from Hideo Ishikawa)
- TMNT – Casey Jones
- Watership Down – Hazel
- Luna Petunia – Sammy Stretch
