= After the Flood (TV series) =

British crime mystery thriller TV series by Mick Ford (2024, 2026)

- Opening title card
- Genre: Crime; Drama; Mystery; Thriller
- Created by: Mick Ford
- Written by: Mick Ford; Roanne Bardsley; Nina Metivier; Joe Forrest; Maxine Alderton
- Directed by: Azhur Saleem
- Starring: Sophie Rundle; Anita Adam Gabayn; Jonas Armstrong; Daniel Betts; Jacqueline Boatswain; George Bukhari; Nicholas Gleaves; Faye McKeever; Matt Stokoe; Tripti Tripuraneni; Lorraine Ashbourne; Philip Glenister
- Composer: Blair Mowat
- Country of origin: United Kingdom
- Original language: English
- No. of series: 2
- No. of episodes: 12

Production
- Executive producers: Richard Fee; Mick Ford; Huw Kennair-Jones; Nicola Shindler
- Producer: Juliet Charlesworth
- Cinematography: Phil Wood
- Running time: 60 minutes
- Production company: Quay Street Productions

Original release
- Network: ITV; ITVX; BritBox (US)
- Release: 10 January 2024 – 2 February 2026

After the Flood is a British crime mystery thriller series created by Mick Ford and directed by Azhur Saleem. It stars Sophie Rundle as a police officer investigating the death of an unidentified man after a flash flood strikes a small English town. The first series commenced airing on 10 January 2024. On 15 November 2024, it was announced that the show has been commissioned for a second series. Series 2 commenced airing on 18 January 2026, with all episodes being released simultaneously on the streaming platform ITVX.

On 13 August 2026, ITV announced that After the Flood would not return for a third series.

== Plot ==
When an unidentified man is found dead in an underground car park after a devastating flood, PC Joanna Marshall is commissioned to investigate the truth of the man's death.

== Cast ==
- Sophie Rundle as PC/DC Joanna Marshall
- Anita Adam Gabay as Tasha Eden
- Jonas Armstrong as Lee Ellison
- Daniel Betts as DCI Roy
- Jacqueline Boatswain as Sarah Mackie
- George Bukhari as Keith
- Nicholas Gleaves as DS Phil Mackie
- Faye McKeever as Kelly
- Matt Stokoe as Pat Holman
- Tripti Tripuraneni as Deepa Das
- Lorraine Ashbourne as Molly Marshall
- Philip Glenister as Jack Radcliffe
- Leo Flanagan as Finn
- Arthur McBain as Daniel Eden
- Amy Forrest as Emma
- Jeanette Percival as Amy
- Gary Hanks as PC Gibson
- Nathalie Armin as Layal Ellis (series 2)
- Alun Armstrong as Alan Benson (series 2)
- Steph de Whalley as Harriet Benson (series 2)
- Anil Desai as DCI Ravi Balsara (series 2)
- Jill Halfpenny as DS Sam Bradley (series 2)
- Matthew McNulty as Xav Palmer (series 2)
- Tony Marshall as Fraser Tempest (series 2)
- Roger Morlidge as Geoff Dixon (series 2)
- Oliver Nelson as Declan Rower (series 2)
- Jenny Platt as Donna Rower (series 2)
- Ian Puleston-Davies as Tony Rower (series 2)
- Jason Walsh as Todd Drake (series 2)

== Episodes ==
Series	Episodes	Originally released	
Series	Episodes	First released	Last released
1	6	10 January 2024	14 February 2024
2	6	18 January 2026	2 February 2026

=== Series 1 (2024) ===
No. overall	No. in series	Title	Directed by	Written by	Original release date	UK viewers (millions)
1	1	"Underwater"	Azhur Saleem	Mick Ford	10 January 2024	5.69
In the wake of a devastating flood, PC Jo Marshall discovers a man's body. As she investigates the suspicious death, the case takes a personal turn changing her life forever.
2	2	"The Arrival"	Azhur Saleem	Mick Ford	17 January 2024	5.61
Jo's actions bring an unwelcome visitor to Waterside when they threaten to reveal her covert investigation.
3	3	"Connections"	Azhur Saleem	Nina Metivier	24 January 2024	5.74
Jo grows uneasy about Lee's ties to Tasha and Daniel, while Pat's suspicions deepen as the investigation progresses.
4	4	"In Too Deep"	Azhur Saleem	Mick Ford and Roanne Bardsley	31 January 2024	6.15
As suspicion mounts around Tasha, Jo makes a crucial breakthrough, just as Molly's safety is suddenly put at risk.
5	5	"Gathering Storm"	Azhur Saleem	Mick Ford	9 February 2024	6.10
Jo and Tasha uncover a surprising truth about Daniel, bringing Jo one step closer to the killer.
6	6	"Breaking Cover"	Azhur Saleem	Mick Ford	14 February 2024	6.14
Jo finally gets to the truth but it comes at a price.

=== Series 2 (2026) ===
No. overall	No. in series	Title	Directed by	Written by	Original release date	UK viewers (millions)
7	1	"Episode 1"	Azhur Saleem	Mick Ford	18 January 2026	3.43
A year after the devastating flood, Jo Marshall, now a detective, investigates a perplexing murder.
8	2	"Episode 2"	Azhur Saleem	Joe Forrest	19 January 2026	3.25
As Jo and Sam struggle to connect Xav Palmer to Todd Drake, a shocking discovery redirects their investigation toward the powerful and secretive Benson family.
9	3	"Episode 3"	Azhur Saleem	Mick Ford	25 January 2026	3.56
When Jo uncovers that the two murder victims were part of a plot to sabotage a chemical plant owned by Alan Benson, she races against time to track down their missing accomplice.
10	4	"Episode 4"	Azhur Saleem	Maxine Alderton & Mick Ford	26 January 2026	3.52
Jo and Sam detain two unexpected suspects, while Mackie makes a shocking discovery.
11	5	"Episode 5"	Azhur Saleem	Maxine Alderton	1 February 2026	3.59
Jack and Mackie butt heads over his lost investment with Pat being led to a secluded spot for a rendezvous with Jo, but when someone else shows up his life could be in danger.
12	6	"Episode 6"	Azhur Saleem	Mick Ford	2 February 2026	3.62
With both Declan and Pat missing, Jo learns about Sam's true intentions in Waterside. Can Jo convince Sam to help bring down Mackie?

== Production ==
The series is produced by Quay Street Productions for ITV and ITVX.

=== Development ===
In a press conference announcing the series' commission, executive producers Nicola Shindler and Richard Fee stated their interest in producing the series after Ford presented the outline to them.

=== Casting ===
On 16 February 2023, it was announced that Sophie Rundle was cast as lead character PC Joanna Marshall, alongside Philip Glenister, Lorraine Ashbourne and Nicholas Gleaves.

=== Filming ===
Filming for series 1 began in March 2023 in Glossop and New Mills, Derbyshire.

== Reception ==
Lucy Mangan of The Guardian awarded the first episode four stars out of five, praising the quality of the characters and the weaving in of global warming. Nick Hilton in The Independent awarded the series three out of five stars.
