= Sophie Rundle =

English actress (born 1988)

- Born: 21 April 1988 (age 38); High Wycombe, Buckinghamshire, England
- Education: Royal Academy of Dramatic Art (BA)
- Occupation: Actress
- Years active: 2007–present
- Partner: Matt Stokoe
- Children: 2

Sophie Rundle (born 21 April 1988) is an English actress. She is best known for her roles as Ada Thorne in Peaky Blinders (2013–2022), Peaky Blinders: The Immortal Man (2026) and Ann Walker in Gentleman Jack (2019–2022).

Her other credits include Lucy in The Bletchley Circle (2012–2014), Labia in Episodes (2012–2014), Alice in Jamestown (2017–2019) and DC Joanna Marshall in After the Flood (2024—2026).

== Early life ==
Rundle was born in High Wycombe, Buckinghamshire. She has two brothers. In her teenage years, her family moved to Dorset, where she attended Bournemouth School for Girls; she appeared in school productions.

From 2008, Rundle attended the Royal Academy of Dramatic Art, graduating in 2011 with a BA in Acting Degree (H Level).

== Career ==
=== Screen ===
Rundle started her career in the British horror comedy film Small Town Folk in 2007 opposite Warwick Davis. In 2012, she starred in the ITV four-part television miniseries period drama, Titanic, created by producer Nigel Stafford-Clark and written by Julian Fellowes, which is based on the sinking of the RMS Titanic. Later that year, she guest-starred as Labia in the British/American television sitcom Episodes opposite Matt LeBlanc and Stephen Mangan, which aired on Showtime and BBC Two.

Also in 2012, Rundle appeared in Great Expectations directed by Mike Newell. The film premiered at the 2012 Toronto International Film Festival and was released in the UK on 30 November 2012. Rundle also played Sefa in the two-part episode Arthur's Bane of the final season of the BBC TV series Merlin.

She played a lead role in the ITV mystery drama series The Bletchley Circle (2012–2014), about four women who investigate a series of murders,

She also appears as Ada Shelby in the BBC Two period crime drama series Peaky Blinders, based on the memoirs of the Shelby family, whose many brothers, sisters, and relatives make up the fiercest gang of all in interwar Birmingham. On mastering the Brummie accent during production, Rundle said that she and the rest of the cast had struggled with it at first because it is not heard much on television, but managed to master the accent after a set visit in Birmingham.

Rundle played the lead role of Fiona Griffiths, a young detective constable in the Sky Living two-part crime series Talking to the Dead, based on the eponymous novel by Harry Bingham. It was adapted by Golden Globe Award-nominee Gwyneth Hughes. On playing Fiona Griffiths, Rundle did some research on Cotard's Syndrome to portray Griffiths accurately.

Rundle guest-starred as Pamela Saint, a young mother who suffers mental health problems after delivering her child, in the seventh episode of the third series of the BBC medical period drama series Call the Midwife, which aired on 2 March 2014. She also starred in the six-part BBC One police procedural series Happy Valley as Kirsten McAskill, a rookie policewoman who stops Lewis (played by Adam Long) for speeding and is then run over by his accomplice in a recent kidnapping, Tommy (portrayed by James Norton), a convicted drug offender, thus killing her. The series debuted on 29 April 2014, and was created by Sally Wainwright which stars Sarah Lancashire and Steve Pemberton.

On 4 October 2014, Rundle appeared in the live cooking programme Saturday Kitchen presented by James Martin as an interviewed guest.

Rundle starred as Eva Smith/Daisy Renton in Helen Edmundson's BBC adaptation of J. B. Priestley's An Inspector Calls, which also starred David Thewlis portraying the title role, Ken Stott and Miranda Richardson. The drama was directed by Aisling Walsh and was broadcast on BBC One on 13 September 2015. In June 2015, Rundle starred as Jenny in the Channel 4 sitcom Not Safe for Work alongside Zawe Ashton, Tom Weston-Jones, Samuel Barnett, Sacha Dhawan and Anastasia Hille. The series was created and written by playwright D. C. Moore and was broadcast on 30 June 2015.

Rundle also portrayed Honoria Barbary in BBC's 20-part a reworking of an ensemble of characters created by Charles Dickens, in BBC One's Dickensian (2015).

In 2016, Rundle starred in the ITV's six-part series titled Brief Encounters, which is loosely based on Gold Group International CEO, Jacqueline Gold's 1995 memoir, Good Vibrations.

In 2017, Rundle starred in Sky 1's drama Jamestown as Alice Kett, one of the "'maids to make wives' who sailed 3,700 miles across the Atlantic to marry a stranger in the New World."

In 2018, Rundle appeared in the six-part thriller, Bodyguard created by Jed Mercurio, with Keeley Hawes and Gina McKee, broadcast on BBC One. The series tells the fictional story of a war veteran now working as a Specialist Protection Officer for the Royalty and Specialist Protection Branch (RaSP) of London's Metropolitan Police. In the same year, Rundle portrayed wealthy heiress Ann Walker, in the joint production between BBC One and HBO biographical drama series about a real-life lesbian couple living in the North of England in the 19th century, titled Gentleman Jack, alongside Suranne Jones and Timothy West. As the series is created by Sally Wainwright, whom Rundle has worked with in Happy Valley, Rundle explained that she was used to Wainwright's writing and intended to be involved before receiving an email regarding the offer to be cast in the series, and was enthused after reading the scripts.

In 2019, Rundle portrayed Princess Diana in an episode of the Sky Arts' Urban Myths series, with David Avery as Freddie Mercury and Mathew Baynton as Kenny Everett.

In 2020, Rundle starred alongside Martin Compston in BBC One programme, The Nest, a five-part psychological drama about a husband and wife who meet an 18-year-old woman who agrees to be their surrogate after years of their trying for a baby. She also appeared in Netflix's The Midnight Sky, playing Jean Sullivan. She also starred in the film Rose as the titular character, alongside her husband Matt Stokoe who also wrote the film.

In 2023, Rundle starred in the Alibi political thriller The Diplomat as Laura Simmonds, a British consul who is determined to protect British nationals who are involved in a series of conflicts in Barcelona.

In February 2023, Rundle starred in the ITV six-part mystery thriller series titled After the Flood as PC Joanna Marshall, a police officer investigating the death of a man after a natural disaster struck.

=== Stage ===
In February 2013, Rundle played Bunty Mainwaring in Stephen Unwin's production of Noël Coward's The Vortex at the Rose Theatre, Kingston.

In December 2014, she played Lucia Kos in a new play titled 3 Winters by London-based Croatian playwright Tena Štivičić, about the Kos family, living at three crucial periods in Croatian history. The play is directed by Howard Davies at the National Theatre.

== Personal life ==
Rundle is engaged to actor Matt Stokoe, whom she met on the set of Jamestown. They have a son born in 2021. Their second son was born in June 2024.

== Acting credits ==
=== Film ===
Year	Title	Role	Notes
2007	Small Town Folk	Heather	
2012	Great Expectations	Clara	
2014	Little Stars	Anna Beavan	Documentary film
2014	The Face of an Angel	Hannah	
2020	The Midnight Sky	Jean	
2020	Rose	Rose	Main role
2026	Peaky Blinders: The Immortal Man	Ada Thorne	

=== Television ===
Year	Title	Role	Notes
2011	Masterchef	Self	Series 7, episode 8
2011	Garrow's Law	Miss Casson	Series 3, episode 4
2012	Titanic	Roberta Maioni	2 episodes
2012	Merlin	Sefa	Episode: "Arthur's Bane"
2012–2014	Episodes	Labia	Recurring role
2012–2014	The Bletchley Circle	Lucy	Main role
2013	Shetland	Sophie	Episode: "Red Bones"
2013	Talking to the Dead	Fiona Griffiths	Main role
2013–2022	Peaky Blinders	Ada Thorne, née Shelby	Main role
2014	Call the Midwife	Pamela Saint	Series 3, episode 7
2014	Happy Valley	Kirsten McAskill	3 episodes
2015	Not Safe for Work	Jenny	Main role
2015	An Inspector Calls	Eva	TV film
2015–2016	Dickensian	Honoria Barbary	Main cast
2016	Brief Encounters	Steph Kirke	Main role
2017–2019	Jamestown	Alice Kett, Mrs. Silas Sharrow	Main role
2017; 2019	Lorraine	Self	Guest appearance
2017	Saturday Kitchen	Self	Guest appearance
2018	Bodyguard	Vicky Budd	Main role
2019–2022	Gentleman Jack	Ann Walker	Main role
2019	Urban Myths	Princess Diana	Episode: "Princess Diana, Freddie And Kenny – One Normal Night"
2019	Elizabeth Is Missing	Susan "Sukey" Jefford	TV film
2020	The Nest	Emily	Main role
2021	Royal Bastards: Rise of the Tudors	Storyteller	TV mini series
2023	The Diplomat	Laura Simmonds	Main role
2024–2026	After the Flood	PC Jo Marshall	Main role

=== Radio ===
Year	Title	Role	Notes
2016	Stardust	Yvaine	Main character

=== Theatre ===
Year	Title	Role	Director	Venue
2013	The Vortex	Bunty	Stephen Unwin	Rose Theatre
2014	Three Winters	Lucia	Howard Davies	Royal National Theatre
2016	Wild Honey	Sofya	Jonathan Kent	Hampstead Theatre
2026	Summerfolk	Varvara Bassova	Robert Hastie	Royal National Theatre
