= Amita Dhiri =

British actress

- Born: 1965 (age 60–61); Brighton, England
- Occupation: Actress
- Spouse: Bradley Carroll
- Children: 2

Amita Emmanuelle Dhiri (born 1965 in Brighton, England) is a British actress.

== Personal life ==
Dhiri was born to a French mother, Antonia and Ugandan-Indian accountant father, Vinod Dhiri. She has two younger brothers and speaks fluent French and Hindi.

She married Bradley Carroll in 1994 and has two daughters.

== Career ==
Dhiri has said that she was very shy when she was little and that this led her into acting. Her first experience of acting came about when a friend of hers who was at film school had a friend who was doing a film for their degree, and asked Dhiri to be in it.

Before going to drama school, Dhiri sang in a touring cabaret group for about 18 months, doing Tina Turner and Janet Jackson impressions

=== Television ===
In 1996, she played the role of Djamila "Milly" Nassim in the acclaimed BBC Two drama series This Life, three years after leaving drama college. Milly was a sensible legal high-flyer who had been in a relationship with Egg (played by Andrew Lincoln), since university. One of her notable scenes was in the last episode, when her character punched her colleague Rachel in the jaw.

She has subsequently had many other appearances on British television, including roles in Absolute Power, The Last Train, Dalziel and Pascoe, Holby City wherein she undertook the role of the raging former partner of General Surgical Consultant Daniel Clifford (played by Peter Wingfield), Silent Witness, Being April and McCallum. In 2003, she had a recurring role as Rachel Crawchek in Judge John Deed.

In early 2007, she reunited with original cast members of This Life in a reunion special called This Life +10. Then on 14 June 2007, Dhiri joined the long-running British police drama The Bill as DC Grace Dasari. In preparation for the role, she spent time with Kennington police in South London, and had a lesson in driving a police patrol car. She remained in the show until its final episode, broadcast on 31 August 2010. In 2013, she played Mrs Rattigan in Sky TV's Talking to the Dead.

She played Deputy Commissioner Vanita in Ragdoll in 2021, and Mrs Khanna in season 3 of Bridgerton in 2024.

=== Film ===
She appeared in the film 24 Hours in London, released in 2000.

== Credits ==
Television

Year	Title	Role	Notes	Production company
1996	Casualty	Julia Kaash	Episode: "Vital Signs"	BBC Television
1996–97	This Life	Milly Naseem	32 episodes	BBC Television
1998	McCallum	Delia Vine	2 episodes	STV Productions
1998	The Last Train	Jandra Nixon	6 episodes	Granada Television
1998	Macbeth - Shakespeare Shorts	First Witch		BBC Television
1999	Dalziel And Pascoe	Shaz Kendall	Episode: "A Sweeter Lazarus"	BBC Television
2000	The Law	Helen Galloway		ITV
2002	The Inspector Lynley Mysteries	Yumna Malik	Episode: "Deception on His Mind"	BBC Television
2002	Holby City	Jenny Stephens	Episode: "Time to Kill"	BBC Television
2002	Happiness	Neela		BBC Television
2002	Grease Monkeys	Mina		BBC Television
2002	Being April	Nikshita	6 episodes	BBC Television
2002	2nd Generation	Rina		Channel 4
2003–05	Judge John Deed	Rachel Crawcheck	Episodes: "Judicial Review", "Conspiracy", "Economic Imperative" and "In Defence of Others"	BBC Television
2004	Silent Witness	Diana Baker	Episode: "Body 21"	BBC Television
2006	Holby City	Camilla	Two episodes: "The Bitterest Pill"; "It's Been a Long Day"	BBC Television
2007	This Life + 10	Milly Naseem		BBC Television
2007–10	The Bill	Grace Dasari	95 episodes	Talkback Thames
2013	Talking to the Dead	Mrs Rattigan		Sky TV
2021	Ragdoll	Deputy Commissioner Vanita		AMC Networks
2024	Bridgerton	Mrs Khanna	2 episodes	Shondaland

Stage

Year	Title	Role	Notes
2000	The Crucible	Elizabeth	Leicester Haymarket Theatre
2001	Feelgood	Aasha	Hampstead/Garrick Theatre
2002	After the Gods	Sandi	Hampstead Theatre
2005	Whose Life Is It Anyway	Helen Hill	Comedy Theatre
2012	Pack	Nasreen	Finborough Theatre - Papatango Festival

Radio

Year	Title	Role	Notes
1997	Devices And Desires	Caroline Amphlette	BBC Radio
2013	When Greed Becomes Hunger	Sunita	BBC Radio 4 Drama
2013	The Aeneid	Anna	BBC Radio 4 Drama
2013	Skios	Annuka Vos	BBC Radio 4 Drama
2013	Invasion - Dangerous Visions	Jenna	BBC Radio 4 Drama

Film

Year	Title	Role	Notes
1994	Indian Tales	Lead	Student film written and directed by Asif Kapadia, Oscar winning director of Amy (2015)
1998	24 Hours in London	Helen Lucas	
2006	Acts of God	DI Mansfield	

Voiceover

Year	Title	Role	Notes
1999	The Canterbury Tales/The Squire’s Tale	Canacee	Animated film
2001	Dream	Sarah	
2002	John Adams: A Portrait and a Concert of American Music	Narrator	
