= Treva Etienne =

English actor

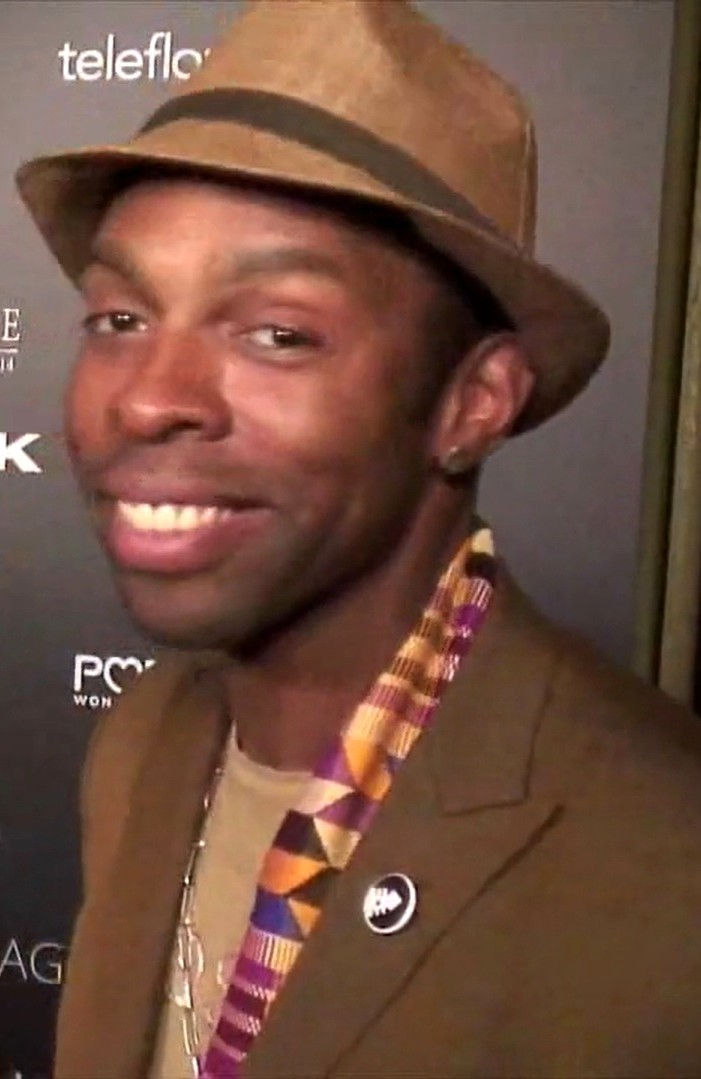
Etienne in 2009

Treva Etienne is an English actor and filmmaker.

== Career ==
Etienne guest starred in the BBC drama Death in Paradise, the CBS spinoff Criminal Minds Beyond Borders, and the CW fantasy/horror Supernatural. He has a leading role in the indie horror movie Itsy Bitsy and was a recurring guest star for two seasons in Steven Spielberg’s sci-fi drama Falling Skies. His movie roles include Terminator Salvation, Pirates of the Caribbean: The Curse of the Black Pearl, Bad Boys II, Black Hawk Down and Eyes Wide Shut. His U.S. TV roles include Undercovers, The Philanthropist, 24, Criminal Minds, Medium, Charmed, Angel and Threat Matrix.

His U.S. independent movie credits include Masked and Anonymous, Mob Rules, Compulsion, Green Street Hooligans II, The Changeling, English as a Second Language, South of The Border, Desert Vows, Japan and Bar Room Babies. He has produced a short film documentary on homeless teens in LA and is currently in post production co-producing a feature-length documentary on Archbishop Desmond Tutu and his message of global forgiveness.

In the UK, Etienne is known for his roles in TV drama series The Last Train, London’s Burning and the BAFTA/RTS award-winning series Holding On. Other TV credits include The Godsend, Casualty, The Bill, Only Fools and Horses, Desmond’s and Sir Peter Hall’s The Final Passage. In 2018, he played in five episodes in the BBC drama series Black Earth Rising.

His theatre credits include the title role in Macbeth at The Royal National Theatre, Moon On a Rainbow Shawl directed by Maya Angelou/Almeida Theatre, Measure for Measure/Shakespeare & Co. USA, Black Poppies/Royal National Theatre, Some Kind Of Hero/Young Vic Theatre, Smile Orange/Leicester Playhouse, Hard Knocks/The Royal Court, Playboy of the West Indies/Manchester Contact Theatre, The Four Seasons/Edinburgh Festival, Noah’s Wife/Edinburgh Festival, An Enchanted Land/Riverside Studios and Angels Rave On/Nottingham Playhouse.

After training with the BBC as a director, he wrote and directed his first short film The Promise of Strangers. His television credits include writing, producing and directing two seasons of BBC’s award-winning comedy sketch show The Real McCoy. He also wrote and directed two award-winning short films, Driving Miss Crazy, which won the HBO Best Short Film in Acapulco, and A Woman Scorned, which won a Best Short Film prize at the Hollywood Scare-fest Film Festival.

Etienne portrayed the character Jacques Avril in seasons 5 and 6 of the TV series Bosch.
