= Talking to the Dead (TV series) =

- Genre: Crime drama; police procedural
- Written by: Gwyneth Hughes
- Directed by: China Moo-Young
- Starring: Sophie Rundle; Russell Tovey; Mark Lewis Jones; Lois Winstone; Christine Tremarco; Keith Allen; Syrus Lowe; Ivana Bašić; Adrian Schiller
- Country of origin: United Kingdom
- Original language: English
- No. of series: 1
- No. of episodes: 2

Production
- Executive producers: Madonna Baptiste; Margery Bone; Robin Gutch
- Producer: Elwen Rowlands
- Cinematography: Adam Suschitzky
- Editor: Daniel Greenway
- Running time: 60 minutes
- Production company: Bonafide Films

Original release
- Network: Sky Living
- Release: 15 October – 17 October 2013

Talking to the Dead is a two-part British television crime drama, written by Gwyneth Hughes and directed by China Moo-Young, that first broadcast on Sky Living on 15 October 2013. The series, which stars Sophie Rundle and Russell Tovey in the principal roles, follows Fiona Griffiths (Rundle), a detective constable with the Cardiff Major Crimes Squad, who tries to solve the murders of a prostitute and her daughter, while dealing with the effects of Cotard's syndrome, which has left her with a deep and peculiar empathy for the dead.

The series was broadcast as the fifth and final project in the Drama Matters strand, a strand designed by Sky Living bosses to highlight the ability of female actors in leading roles. The series is based upon the novel of the same name by Harry Bingham, and also stars Mark Lewis Jones, Lois Winstone, Christine Tremarco and Keith Allen in leading roles. The series was released on Region 2 DVD in the Netherlands in 2014.

== Cast ==
- Sophie Rundle as DC Fiona Griffiths
- Russell Tovey as DS Huw Brydon
- Mark Lewis Jones as DCI Owen Jackson
- Lois Winstone as Stacey Edwards
- Christine Tremarco as DC Eluned 'Elli' Jones
- Keith Allen as Robbie Griffiths
- Syrus Lowe as DC Carl Richards
- Ivana Bašić as Asya Adamkute
- Adrian Schiller as Dr. Price
- Mufrida Hayes as Sue Phillips
- Niall Greig Fulton as Aras Kalvaitis
- Hywel Morgan as Paul Fletcher
- Michael Smiley as David Penry
- Jens Hultén as Lev
- Jay Simpson as Jimmy Dawkins
- Manon Eames as Gwen Griffiths
- Anita Reynolds as Deryn Franklin
- Amita Dhiri as Mrs. Rattigan
- Richard Tunley as DCI Matthews
- Huw Davies as Graham Redmond
- Keith Woodason as Jon Carey
- Karli Vale as Caron Rhys
- Amy Loughton as Andi Rodriguez
- Emma Wylie as extra (pilot)

== Episodes ==
No.	Title	Directed by	Written by	Original release date	Viewers (millions)
1	"Part 1"	China Moo-Young	Gwyneth Hughes	15 October 2013	0.18
A police officer with a deep empathy for the dead begins her fledgling career in Cardiff's Major Crimes team, and she's determined to get involved in the case of a murdered former prostitute.
2	"Part 2"	China Moo-Young	Gwyneth Hughes	17 October 2013	0.13
Fiona continues her investigation into Cardiff's dark underbelly, juggling a complex case with emerging secrets from her troubled past.

== Reception ==
The series broadcast to mixed reception, with Alison Graham of the Radio Times writing; "One day someone will invent a female detective who’ll cleverly solve crimes, who will work within the rules and who will return home to a nice partner with whom she has a happy relationship. Until then we have the likes of unkempt, very young DC Fiona Griffiths, who clumsily drops her files on her first day as a rookie member of the Cardiff major crimes team and who, though very bright, is obviously battling unspecified demons. Talking to the Dead is a woolly, hard-to-fathom story that is saved entirely by the winning Rundle, who you will want to see again."

Jane Simon of The Mirror wrote a similar review, commenting; "The last in the Drama Matters series is my least favourite but, ironically, the one most likely to go to a full series because it’s another off-kilter police procedural of the kind TV viewers can’t seem to get their fill of. It’s also the only one in the run to be served up in two parts with the concluding half on Thursday. Sophie Rundle, who’s currently being so ballsy in Peaky Blinders, stars as the terrifyingly young-looking detective constable Fiona Griffiths with Russell Tovey as a fellow cop. I was really looking forward to the moment when Fiona would solve her first murder by actually talking to the dead, or more specifically, the moment when the dead would talk to her. But like Wire in the Blood and Waking the Dead, that title promises much more spookiness than it delivers."

Ellen Jones of The Independent published a slightly more positive review, writing; "Detective Fiona Griffiths began her first day in a new job by clumsily dropping all her casework folders at the feet of her CO. Apparently, she's old enough to be investigating murders, despite looking approximately 12. You may recognise the actress as 25-year-old Sophie Rundle, who plays Ada Shelby in BBC2's Peaky Blinders. That's the more glamorous role, but it's her performance in this two-part crime drama that really reveals Rundle's charm. This adaptation clearly struggled to sort the story's myriad details into a properly paced sixty minutes, but once you gave up on following the murder plot, there was plenty else to enjoy. The four previous one-off dramas in Sky Living's Drama Matters series have varied from unsatisfying morsels to hearty dramatic meals. Like one of Kimberly's perfectly baked canapés, Talking to the Dead offered just enough flavour to tantalise, while leaving us hungry for the next course."
