= The Diplomat (British TV series) =

British political thriller TV series

- Genre: Crime; drama; thriller
- Created by: Ben Richards
- Written by: Ben Richards
- Starring: Sophie Rundle; Serena Manteghi; Dylan Brady; Laia Costa; Steven Cree; Danny Sapani; Isak Férriz; Bert Seymour; Philipp Boos
- Countries of origin: United Kingdom; Spain
- Original languages: English; Spanish; Catalan
- No. of series: 1
- No. of episodes: 6

Production
- Executive producers: Philippa Collie Cousins; Simon Heath; Martin Rakusen
- Producers: Ken Horn; Elizabeth Binns; Jordi Utset
- Cinematography: Matt North
- Running time: 45 minutes
- Production companies: BBC Studios; World Productions

Original release
- Network: Alibi
- Release: 28 February 2023 – present

The Diplomat is a British political thriller series written by Ben Richards and directed by Jill Robertson and Jennie Paddon. It stars Clare Holman, Danny Sapani, Steven Cree, Laia Costa, and Sophie Rundle in lead roles. The series is produced by BBC Studios and World Productions for Alibi. It began airing on 28 February 2023.

== Premise ==
The series follows British diplomat Laura Simmonds, who, with her Barcelona Consul colleague and friend Alba Ortiz, is determined to fight in order to protect British nationals involved in a series of conflicts in Barcelona.

== Cast ==
- Sophie Rundle as Laura Simmonds
- Serena Manteghi as Alba Ortiz
- Dylan Brady as Carl Hyndley
- Laia Costa as Mariona Cabell
- Steven Cree as Sam Henderson
- Danny Sapani as Colin Sutherland
- Isak Férriz as Inspector Castells
- Clare Holman as Paula
- Bert Seymour as Seth Miller
- Philipp Boos as Fabian Hartmann
- Lodi Emeruwa as Tom
- Eubha Akilade as Amy Callaghan
- Tamsin Topolski as Izzy Miller
- Edon Rizvanolli as Peter van der Meer

== Episodes ==
No.	Title	Directed by	Written by	Original release date	UK viewers (millions)
1	"Episode 1"	Jill Robertson	Ben Richards	28 February 2023	N/A
2	"Episode 2"	Jill Robertson	Ben Richards	7 March 2023	N/A
3	"Episode 3"	Jill Robertson	Lauren Klee	14 March 2023	N/A
4	"Episode 4"	Jennie Paddon	Lauren Klee	21 March 2023	N/A
5	"Episode 5"	Jennie Paddon	Ben Richards	28 March 2023	N/A
6	"Episode 6"	Jennie Paddon	Ben Richards	4 April 2023	N/A

== Production ==
=== Development ===
On 8 July 2020, The Diplomat was commissioned by British pay television channel Alibi in partnership with BBC Studios and World Productions as the third UKTV Original for Alibi.

Executive producer and UKTV drama commissioner Philippa Collie Cousins stated that both main characters "are contrasting professional working women dealing with murder, abductions, and organised crime, alongside managing their careers and love lives ... it is The Good Wife meets Spooks for 2021 ..."

The series is written by Ben Richards and directed by Jill Robertson and Jennie Paddon.

=== Casting ===
On 25 April 2022, Sophie Rundle was cast as the lead character Laura Simmonds.

=== Filming ===
Principal photography began in April 2022 in Barcelona, Spain, after being postponed from the original 2020 schedule owing to the COVID-19 pandemic.

=== Title ===
An unrelated American series with an identical title, set in London and centred on a new United States ambassador to the UK, was announced in 2022, two years after the British series was announced, and released worldwide on Netflix on 20 April 2023, only a few weeks after the UK programme concluded its first series. The British newspaper i quoted an unnamed source close to the UK series as being frustrated by the title choice for the Netflix series, fearing it would confuse viewers and complicate international rights sales for the Alibi series, which are handled by BBC Studios. Neither party has indicated a willingness to change the title to avoid confusion.

== Broadcast ==
The Diplomat began airing on 28 February 2023.
