= Bodyguard (British TV series) =

2018 British TV series

- Genre: Drama; Police procedural; Political thriller
- Created by: Jed Mercurio
- Written by: Jed Mercurio
- Directed by: Thomas Vincent; John Strickland
- Starring: Richard Madden; Keeley Hawes; Gina McKee; Sophie Rundle; Vincent Franklin; Pippa Haywood; Paul Ready; Tom Brooke; Nicholas Gleaves; Stuart Bowman; Stephanie Hyam; David Westhead; Matt Stokoe; Nina Toussaint-White; Ash Tandon; Anjli Mohindra
- Composers: Ruth Barrett; Ruskin Williamson
- Country of origin: United Kingdom
- Original language: English
- No. of series: 1
- No. of episodes: 6

Production
- Executive producers: Simon Heath; Jed Mercurio; Elizabeth Kilgarriff
- Producers: Priscilla Parish; Eric Coulter
- Production location: London
- Cinematography: John Lee
- Editors: Steve Singleton (ep. 1–3); Andrew John McClelland (ep. 4–6)
- Running time: 56–75 minutes
- Production company: World Productions

Original release
- Network: BBC One
- Release: 26 August – 23 September 2018

Bodyguard is a British political thriller television series created and written by Jed Mercurio and produced by World Productions as part of ITV Studios for the BBC. The six-part series centres around the fictional character of Police Sergeant David Budd (Richard Madden), a British Army war veteran suffering from PTSD, who is now working for the Royalty and Specialist Protection Branch of London's Metropolitan Police Service. He is assigned as the principal protection officer (PPO) for the ambitious Home Secretary Julia Montague (Keeley Hawes), whose politics he despises. The series draws attention to controversial issues such as government monitoring of private information and its regulation, the politics of intervention and terrorism, and PTSD.

The series began broadcasting on BBC One on 26 August 2018, achieving the highest viewing figures for a new BBC drama in the multichannel era and the highest BBC viewing figures since 2008. The BBC commissioned the series from the then-independent World Productions in 2016. Since ITV Studios Global Entertainment acquired the company in 2017, they have handled international distribution for the series. Netflix agreed to a distribution deal to broadcast the show outside the United Kingdom and Ireland.

The series was met with critical acclaim, particularly for Madden's performance. The series received numerous award nominations including the Golden Globe Award for Best Television Series – Drama, with Madden winning the Golden Globe Award for Best Actor – Television Series Drama. At the 71st Primetime Emmy Awards, the series was nominated for Outstanding Drama Series.

== Cast and characters ==
=== Main ===
Budd family

- Richard Madden as PS David Budd, a Scottish veteran of the Afghanistan war and now dedicated Principal Protection Officer (PPO) at Protection Command. His wartime experiences have left him struggling with PTSD, prone to volatile behaviour, and mistrustful of politicians. Assigned to protect Julia Montague, whose politics he loathes, Budd is conflicted over his loyalties.
- Sophie Rundle as Vicky Budd, David's wife and the mother of their two children, who works as a ward sister at a London hospital. David's unpredictable moods and issues with PTSD since returning from Afghanistan resulted in their becoming estranged.

Government

- Keeley Hawes as The Rt Hon. Julia Montague MP, the Home Secretary and Conservative Party Member of Parliament for the fictional constituency of Thames West. Montague's suspected desire to become Prime Minister, and her controversial additions to the Regulation of Investigatory Powers Act 2000, dubbed "RIPA-18" and "The Snoopers' Charter", which would give greater powers to the police and Security Services to investigate personal communications and information, have resulted in many enemies.
- Vincent Franklin as Mike Travis MP, Minister of State for Security, who grows increasingly resentful over being excluded from Montague's dealings with MI5.
- Nicholas Gleaves as The Rt Hon. Roger Penhaligon MP, the Government Chief Whip, Member of Parliament for Surrey North and Montague's ex-husband. A staunch supporter of the Prime Minister, he becomes increasingly suspicious and wary of Montague's political ambition.
- David Westhead as The Rt Hon. John Vosler MP, the prime minister of the United Kingdom and Leader of the Conservative Party.
- Paul Ready as Rob MacDonald, Special Adviser to the Home Secretary, who has a crush on Montague.

Police

- Gina McKee as Commander Anne Sampson, Head of Counter Terrorism Command (SO15) and Deepak Sharma's superior. Threatened by Montague's preference for MI5, Sampson enlists Budd's help.
- Pippa Haywood as CSI Lorraine Craddock, Budd's commanding officer at Protection Command, who assigns him to protect Montague.
- Ash Tandon as DCI Deepak Sharma, a senior detective in SO15 leading the investigation into the recent series of terror activities. As things fail to add up, he becomes suspicious of Budd.
- Nina Toussaint-White as DS Louise Rayburn, an SO15 officer working under Sharma who starts to work with Budd.

Security Service / MI5

- Stuart Bowman as Stephen Hunter-Dunn, Director General of the Security Service (MI5), whose surveillance powers will be significantly enhanced by RIPA 18. Montague's preference for MI5 over SO15 puts him at odds with Sampson.
- Michael Shaeffer as "Richard Longcross", an enigmatic MI5 officer working under Hunter-Dunn who becomes involved in a cat-and-mouse game with Budd.

Criminals

- Tom Brooke as Andrew 'Andy' Apsted, a war veteran and friend of Budd's. Scarred both physically and mentally by his experiences in Afghanistan, Apsted leads the anti-war Veterans Peace Group.
- Matt Stokoe as Luke Aikens, a mysterious organised crime leader. He seeks to eliminate the Home Secretary.
- Anjli Mohindra as Nadia Ali, implicated with her husband in an attempted bombing on a London-bound train service.

=== Recurring ===
Family

- Matthew Stagg as Charlie Budd, David and Vicky's 8-year-old son. Charlie attends Heath Bank Primary School in Camberwell.
- Bella Padden as Ella Budd, David and Vicky's 10-year-old daughter. Ella attends Heath Bank Primary School in Camberwell.

Government

- Shubham Saraf as Tahir Mahmood, Montague's PR Adviser.
- Stephanie Hyam as Chanel Dyson, the PR Adviser to the Home Secretary before getting fired by Montague.

Police

- Claire-Louise Cordwell as Constable Kim Knowles, a Protection Command bodyguard in Budd's team.
- Richard Riddell as Constable Tom Fenton, a Protection Command bodyguard in Budd's team.

== Episodes ==
No.	Episode	Directed by	Written by	Original release date	UK viewers (millions)
1	Episode 1	Thomas Vincent	Jed Mercurio	26 August 2018	14.42
Police Sergeant David Budd, an Afghanistan War veteran, is on a train to London Euston when he foils a suicide bomber's plot to blow up the train. Due to his actions, the man and woman terrorists are arrested and taken into custody for interrogation. His heroism results in his promotion to serve on the personal detail of Julia Montague, the Home Secretary. There is tension between the two, as Montague has supported the Iraq War and War in Afghanistan and plans to update RIPA, which opponents believe will threaten civil rights. Budd's experience as a soldier has resulted in his hostility to continued government action there. Montague's ex-husband and Chief Whip Roger Penhaligon suspects her of exploiting the terrorist threat, and of intentions to try to replace the prime minister. Meanwhile, Budd struggles to deal with both his PTSD and his deteriorating relationship with his wife. Budd meets Andy Apsted, an old army friend, in the anti-war Veterans Peace Group. Apsted is disgusted with his friend's new career.
2	Episode 2	Thomas Vincent	Jed Mercurio	27 August 2018	15.04
Stephen Hunter-Dunn, Director General of MI5, informs Montague of intelligence suggesting a terrorist plan to attack Budd's children's school in retaliation for his foiling of the train bombing. He advises her to keep it secret, fearing a member of the police might have leaked Budd's information to the terrorists. The attack is foiled, but the bomb used detonates on a timer, killing both terrorists and three police officers. Montague controversially transfers investigation of the attempted bombing of the school to MI5. Budd's family is relocated to a safe house. He is removed from Montague's detail, but she has him reinstated. She also arranges the offer of a place at a special needs school for Budd's son. Returning from a meeting at COBRA, Montague's car comes under sniper fire that kills her driver, but she and Budd survive. Budd pursues and corners the sniper, who is revealed to be Apsted before he kills himself. Budd hides his relationship with Apsted. That evening, Budd and Montague act on their attraction and have sex. The next day he is instructed by Anne Sampson, Head of the Metropolitan Police Counter Terrorism Command, and his superior, CSI Lorraine Craddock, to record Montague's meetings. They also tell him she had prior knowledge that his children's school would be targeted.
3	Episode 3	Thomas Vincent	Jed Mercurio	2 September 2018	14.16
A man calling himself Richard Longcross gives a tablet to Montague, with instructions to use it to access encrypted information. Budd researches Longcross, but is unable to find his profile. With Budd serving as her driver, Montague corners the prime minister at Chequers, but their conversation is not revealed. Budd is interviewed by Counter Terrorism Command detectives Sharma and Rayburn, who seem sceptical about his account of the sniper attack. RIPA 18 passes the third House of Commons vote. Mike Travis, Minister of State for Counter-Terrorism, meets Penhaligon to express concern about Montague's relationship with MI5. After Budd chokes Montague during a PTSD episode, she keeps her distance. But before Montague gives a planned speech, she tells Budd that she was informed his children's school was a possible terrorist target. She says she wants him by her side, not because it is his job, but by choice. As she is giving her speech, Budd sees her PR adviser Tahir Mahmood outside the auditorium, but allows him in after checking his briefcase. Seconds later a bomb explodes.
4	Episode 4	John Strickland	Jed Mercurio	9 September 2018	16.18
Knowles and Mahmood were killed in the blast and Montague is in intensive care. Travis is appointed Acting Home Secretary and transfers responsibility for investigating the bombings back to Counter Terrorism Command. The police suspect that Mahmood was responsible for the bombing, but CCTV is not conclusive that the explosion emanated from the briefcase. Budd falls under suspicion because he failed to spot the bomb when clearing Mahmood. DCI Sharma and DS Rayburn interview him and search his property. The next day, the PM announces that Montague is dead. CCTV from the House of Commons shows adviser Rob MacDonald handing Mahmood the briefcase. Before MacDonald is interviewed by police, Travis tells him to stick to their pre-arranged story. Budd attempts suicide, but fails because someone has replaced the bullets in his hidden pistol with blanks. Returning to Montague's hotel, he discovers the security footage has been tampered with to delete Longcross's visit. On orders from Sampson, he accompanies Rayburn to interview Nadia, the suicide bomber on the train, about who had supplied explosives to her. Nadia does not identify the bomb-maker among the pictures she is shown, which include one of Mahmood.
5	Episode 5	John Strickland	Jed Mercurio	16 September 2018	16.85
Analysis establishes that the bomb was not in the briefcase, but under the stage. Rayburn discovers that CCTV footage from before the attack was altered, and Budd creates an E-FIT of Longcross. Apsted is identified by SO15, with his past as an army EOD officer raising suspicion that he might have been the bomb maker. Nadia identifies Longcross as the man her husband met. Budd researches the kompromat Montague was given, and ambushes Penhaligon at his constituency surgery, accusing him of trying to steal the tablet while she was in hospital. Hunter-Dunn denies any association with Longcross, but still refuses to share information with police. MacDonald reveals he and the party planned to embarrass Montague by altering her speech, but never intended physical harm. Budd meets with a gun dealer and attempts to acquire the same type of sniper rifle Apsted used. This attracts the attention of Luke Aikens, a powerful crime lord and another member of the conspiracy. Chanel Dyson, the PR who Montague fired, meets Budd at a coffee shop. She invites him for drinks and he gives her his number. Chanel is driven away in the same Range Rover that picked her up after she was fired. It is driven by Luke Aikens. Information regarding Budd's relationship with Montague is leaked, and Budd suspects the security service had bugged Montague's hotel room. PC Tom Fenton, Budd's colleague raises concerns about Budd's self-inflicted head injury. Craddock suspends him from duty and revokes his firearms licence. He visits Montague's flat and finds the tablet hidden in a photo frame.
6	Episode 6	John Strickland	Jed Mercurio	23 September 2018	17.06
Aikens abducts Budd and fits him in a suicide vest with a dead man's switch. The police are called, but they do not believe his story and instead suspect Budd's involvement in the conspiracy due to his newly revealed connection to Apsted. Budd says that he had lied about that to avoid being a fall guy. MI5 is monitoring the scene; suspecting that he is being watched, Budd gives false information about the location of the kompromat, and MI5 sends Longcross to retrieve it. However, Budd booby-trapped the flat with pepper spray, temporarily blinding Longcross, who is arrested. After a stand-off, Vicky runs to Budd to prevent the police from shooting him. Still wearing the vest, Budd leads the police to his flat, where Vicky gives them the kompromat and the blank rounds that confirm Budd's innocence. The explosives officer helps Budd disarm the vest and Budd escapes so he can prove his innocence. He discovers Craddock is Aikens's police insider and refrains from fatally shooting Aikens. After Aikens and Craddock are arrested, Craddock confesses to leaking Montague's movements and enabling her assassination. She also admits that she chose Budd to be Montague's PPO because his military/PTSD background made him a perfect fall guy. Nadia is interviewed again and reveals she lied about recognising Longcross's E-FIT. Nadia says that she built the explosive devices herself. She remembered Budd telling her details about his children as he disarmed her first suicide vest; she passed that on for the attack on their school. Nadia also reveals Aikens paid her for the bomb that killed Montague; Montague's RIPA-18 would have allowed the police more powers to investigate criminal activities, especially Aikens's. The kompromat is leaked, apparently by Sampson, and she tells Budd that the prime minister and the Director-General of MI5 will resign. Budd starts occupational health treatment to deal with PTSD, and he and Vicky travel with their children to visit his parents.

== Production ==
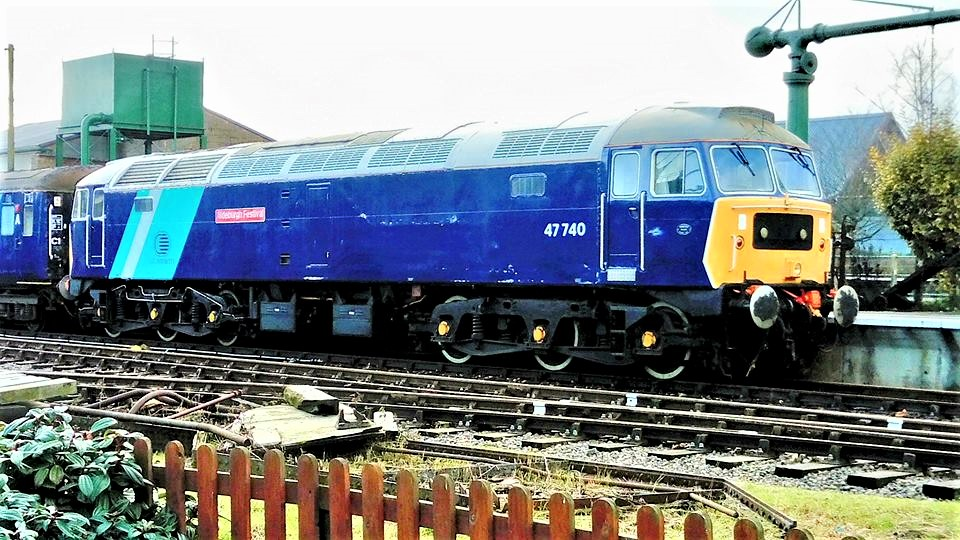
The train used for filming the opening scenes.

The series was largely filmed on location in London, including the Whittington Estate for Budd's flat and Battersea for Montague's flat. The bomb scenes in the final episode were filmed around CityPoint near Moorgate and Woburn Square and Senate House in Bloomsbury.

The train scenes in the first episode were filmed on the Mid-Norfolk Railway.

BBC journalists including Andrew Marr, John Pienaar, John Humphrys, and Laura Kuenssberg appear as themselves.

== Reception ==
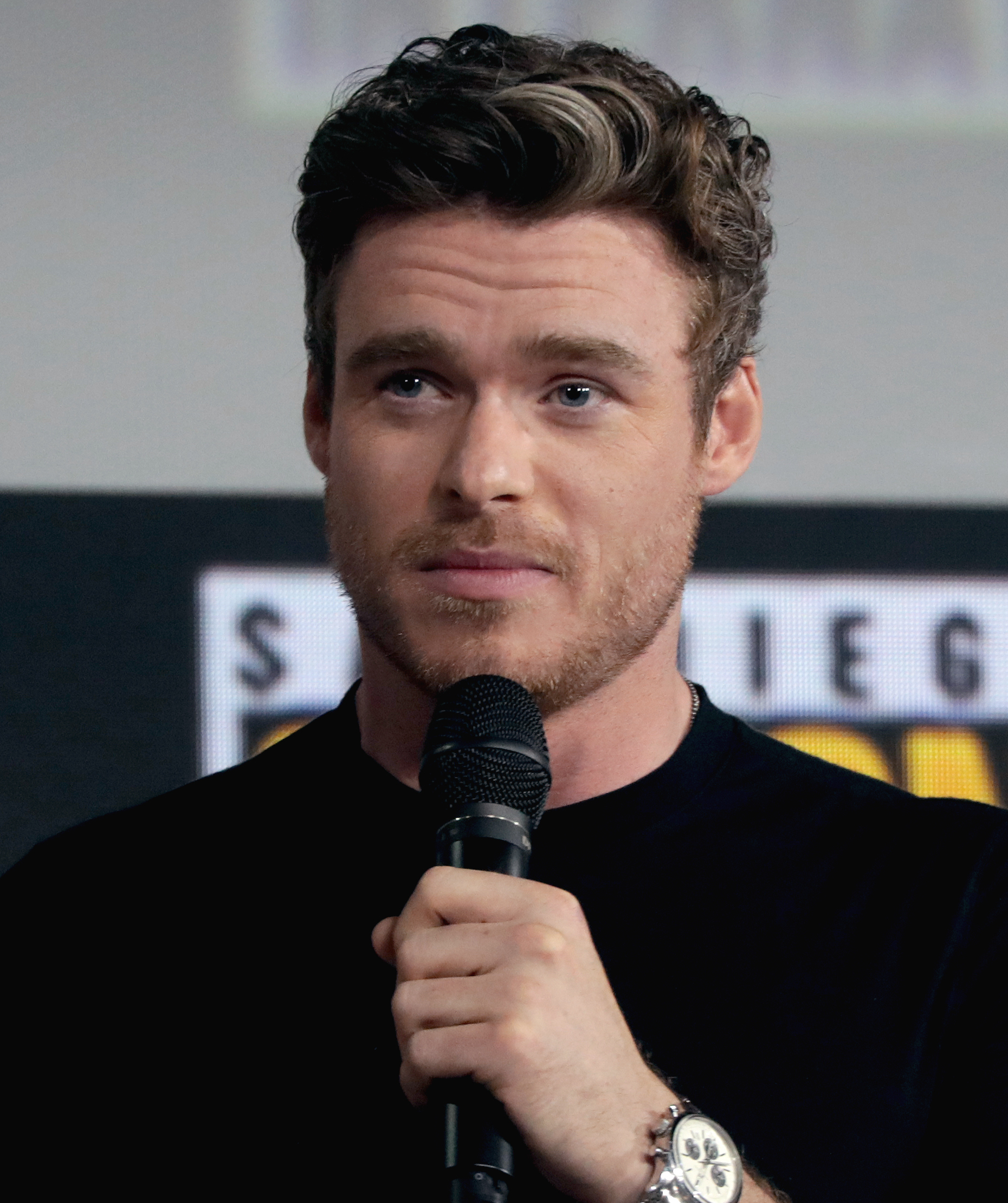
Richard Madden's performance as David Budd garnered acclaim from critics and audiences.

=== Audience ===
Viewing figures for the series were high; the premiere was seen by 6.8 million viewers on BBC One, while adding an additional 3.6 million through catch-up and iPlayer to exceed 10.4 million—making it the BBC's highest-rated drama premiere to-date. It was also the highest-rated non-soap of the year among viewers 16–34. An average of 10.4 million live viewers watched the finale on BBC One, peaking at 11 million at the conclusion; it became the BBC's most-watched drama since the Doctor Who Christmas special in 2008.

As significant numbers of viewers watched Bodyguard on the iPlayer after transmission, the series sparked a debate on how the media should handle spoilers. Radio Times revealed the fate of Montague in a cover story during the series's original transmission.

=== Critical response ===
On the review aggregator website Rotten Tomatoes, 93% of 71 critics' reviews are positive. The website's consensus reads: "Bodyguard maintains a palpable tension throughout its pulpy proceedings to create an absorbing and addicting psychological thriller." Metacritic, which uses a weighted average, assigned the series a score of 79 out of 100, based on 12 critics, indicating "generally favorable" reviews.

In a positive review, Variety's Daniel D'Addario describes the series as "Both juicy in its delving into character psychology and rippingly ready to tear up its playbook as it goes, it's a six-episode ride that demands, and rewards, a quick binge." D'Addario further states that the series "excels at both the daring, gasp-inducing twist and the methodical construction of slower-burning thrills", and that Madden's performance "by turns tripping on his own empathy, and angrily operating beyond rationality, makes us believe anything is possible — a wonderful asset for a show that seeks above all else to keep us watching". Allison Keene, writing for Collider, lauds the performances of the cast, describing Madden's as "enthralling" and "absolutely heartbreaking", and depicts the series as "an exhilarating ride that truly showcases Madden as a major talent". Writing for Time, Judy Berman states that the series "subverts thriller tropes just often enough to earn its reliance on them", and in a five-star review Guardian critic Lucy Mangan expresses that "[Mercurio] has created something as dark and moreish as ever". Hanh Nguyen of IndieWire describes the series as "relentless", and the performances of Madden and Hawes as "mesmerizing". Robert Rorke of the New York Post writes that the series is "gripping" and that Madden "gives a magnetic performance".

In a more mixed assessment, Robert Lloyd of the Los Angeles Times wrote that "Some elements of the series struck me as odd...and certain climactic revelations had me talking to the screen. But the action is well mounted and the tension tightly wound; it uncoils, when it does, with a satisfying snap". In a similarly mixed review, The Atlantic's Sophie Gilbert acknowledged that "Hawes is elegantly unknowable as Julia...she gives just enough nuance in her performance to make you question whether she has a heart or is extremely deft at emotional manipulation", however she laments that "To watch Bodyguard's six episodes is to suspend disbelief and submit to its surprises. It helps not to expect too much more than that, particularly when it comes to the show's lavish employment of archetypes, which inevitably leads to its more questionable elements."

Intelligent Protection International Limited's CEO Alex Bomberg on BBC Radio 5 Live said that the plot, in particular the personal relationship that Budd developed with his charge, would be frowned upon as both unprofessional and putting the charge at risk. Detective Chief Inspector Steve Ray, of the Royalty and Specialist Protection Command (RaSP) told the BBC that "the relationship that we have with our principals is purely professional", adding that anyone who crossed the line would quickly be identified and would not last very long in Protection Command or even in the police service".

=== Accolades ===
Year	Award	Category	Nominee(s)	Result	Ref.
2018	RTS Craft & Design Awards	Best Sound – Drama	Dan Johnson, Simon Farmer, Jamie Caple, and Marc Lawes	Won	
2018	Golden Globe Awards	Best Television Series – Drama	Bodyguard	Nominated	
2018	Golden Globe Awards	Best Actor – Television Series Drama	Richard Madden	Won	
2019	Critics' Choice Television Awards	Best Actor in a Drama Series	Richard Madden	Nominated	
2019	National Television Awards	New Drama	Bodyguard	Won	
2019	National Television Awards	Drama Performance	Richard Madden	Won	
2019	American Cinema Editors Awards	Best Edited Drama Series for Non-Commercial Television	Steve Singleton for "Episode 1"	Won	
2019	Golden Reel Awards	Broadcast Media Longform Dialogue / ADR	Dan Johnson and James Gregory for "Episode 2"	Nominated	
2019	Broadcast Awards	Best Drama Series or Serial	Bodyguard	Nominated	
2019	Globe de Cristal Awards	Meilleure série étrangère	Bodyguard	Nominated	
2019	TRIC Awards	Best Crime	Bodyguard	Won	
2019	Broadcasting Press Guild	Best Drama Series	Bodyguard	Nominated	
2019	Broadcasting Press Guild	Best Actress	Keeley Hawes	Nominated	
2019	British Academy Television Awards	Best Drama Series	Bodyguard	Nominated	
2019	British Academy Television Awards	Best Actress	Keeley Hawes	Nominated	
2019	British Academy Television Awards	Virgin TV's Must-See Moment	Julia Montague assassinated	Won	
2019	British Academy Television Craft Awards	Best Director: Fiction	Thomas Vincent for "Episode 1"	Nominated	
2019	British Academy Television Craft Awards	Best Editing: Fiction	Steve Singleton for "Episode 1"	Nominated	
2019	British Academy Television Craft Awards	Best Sound: Fiction	Simon Farmer, Dan Johnson and Marc Lawes	Nominated	
2019	Banff Rockie Awards	Best English-language Drama Series	Bodyguard	Won	
2019	Monte-Carlo Television Festival	Best TV Series – Drama	Bodyguard	Nominated	
2019	Monte-Carlo Television Festival	Outstanding Actor in a TV Series – Drama	Richard Madden	Won	
2019	Monte-Carlo Television Festival	Outstanding Actress in a TV Series – Drama	Keeley Hawes	Nominated	
2019	Primetime Emmy Awards	Outstanding Drama Series	Bodyguard	Nominated	
2019	Primetime Emmy Awards	Outstanding Writing for a Drama Series	Jed Mercurio for "Episode 1"	Nominated	
2019	Seoul International Drama Awards	Best Mini-Series	Bodyguard	Nominated	
2019	Seoul International Drama Awards	Best Actor	Richard Madden	Nominated	
2019	Seoul International Drama Awards	Best Director	Thomas Vincent and John Strickland	Nominated	
2019	Seoul International Drama Awards	Best Screenwriter	Jed Mercurio	Won	
2019	British Academy Scotland Awards	Best Actor in Television	Richard Madden	Nominated	

== Red Nose Bodyguard ==
A skit titled Red Nose Bodyguard was filmed in support of Comic Relief, featuring many cast members from the series as well as performances from Joanna Lumley, Adrian Dunbar and Sanjeev Bhaskar. The skit was first broadcast on Red Nose Day 2019 on 15 March 2019.

Production Designer Jamie Lapsley came back alongside Jed Mercurio for this skit, having successfully collaborated on the original series.

== See also ==
- List of fictional prime ministers of the United Kingdom
