= Ragdoll (TV series) =

Thriller television miniseries

- Genre: Crime thriller; Drama; Mystery
- Created by: Freddy Syborn
- Based on: Ragdoll by Daniel Cole
- Written by: Freddy Syborn
- Starring: Henry Lloyd-Hughes; Thalissa Teixeira; Lucy Hale; Michael Smiley; Ali Cook; Natasha Little; Kobna Holdbrook-Smith; Angus Wright; Amita Dhiri; Phil Davis; Camilla Beeput; Douggie McMeekin; Samantha Spiro; Sam Troughton
- Music by: Moses Boyd
- Countries of origin: United States; United Kingdom
- Original language: English
- No. of seasons: 1
- No. of episodes: 6

Production
- Executive producers: Sally Woodward Gentle; Lee Morris; Freddy Syborn
- Producer: Lizzie Rusbridger
- Cinematography: Dave Pimm; Phil Wood
- Editors: Dan Crinnion; Paul Dingwall; Galina Chakarova
- Running time: 44–46 minutes
- Production companies: AMC Studios; Sid Gentle Films

Original release
- Network: AMC+ (United States); Alibi (United Kingdom)
- Release: November 11 – December 16, 2021

Ragdoll is a thriller television miniseries based upon the novel of the same name by Daniel Cole. In the United States, it premiered on AMC+ on November 11, 2021, and in the United Kingdom, it premiered on Alibi on December 6, 2021.

== Premise ==
Set in London, the series follows the murder of six people who have been dismembered and sewn into the shape of a grotesque body, "the Ragdoll". As detectives begin to investigate, the killer begins to taunt them.

== Cast and characters ==
- Henry Lloyd-Hughes as DS Nathan Rose, a police officer who becomes the killer's latest target
- Thalissa Teixeira as DI Emily Baxter
- Lucy Hale as Lake Edmunds, a former New Jersey police officer turned DC
- Michael Smiley as DS Finlay
- Ali Cook as DCI Terrence Simmons
- Natasha Little as Andrea Wyld
- Kobna Holdbrook-Smith as Joel Shepton
- Angus Wright as Judge Wingate
- Amita Dhiri as Deputy Commissioner Vanita
- Phil Davis as Mayor Turnbull
- Camilla Beeput as Alyssa
- Douggie McMeekin as Eric Turner
- Samantha Spiro as Joy
- Sam Troughton as Thomas Massey / "The Ragdoll Killer"

== Episodes ==
No.	Title	Directed by	Written by	U.S. release date
1	"Episode 1"	Toby MacDonald	Freddy Syborn	November 11, 2021
Two years ago, DS Nathan Rose is attending a trial after having been accused of illegally obtaining evidence against serial killer Mark Hooper. With the evidence illegitimate, Hooper is cleared of all murder charges. Rose attacks and beats him. In the present, he, DI Emily Baxter, and former New Jersey cop-turned-DC Lake Edmunds investigate the gruesome discovery of a sewn together body, which includes Hooper's head. The body's fingers point towards Rose's apartment. Baxter and Edmunds visit Hooper's prison, where they learn that he was poisoned. Rose receives a mysterious envelope, which contains a list of six people, supposedly the killer's targets. It includes himself and Mayor of London Ray Turnbull. Extensive security is put around the mayor and he is brought to the station. As Turnbull lights a cigarette, the air ignites and sets him ablaze right in front of Rose. Suffering from PTSD, he attends therapy sessions and opens up about his stay on a psychiatric ward, where he met Joel Shepton. Shepton offered him the phone number of someone called Faust, who kills on demand. Initially hesitant, Rose asks for Faust's number. Despite telling his therapist that Faust does not exist, flashbacks reveal that he called him and ordered Hooper to be killed.
2	"Episode 2"	Toby MacDonald	Freddy Syborn	November 18, 2021
The focus of the investigation turns to the Witness Protection Unit, while DI Baxter discovers body cam footage that proves that one of its officers, Copley, changed the mayor's inhaler. He is arrested, but indirectly denies responsibility and stabs himself with a pen. Baxter confesses to Rose that she had written Chambers' letter, not him, and that she had betrayed Rose's trust, but he forgives her. Rose visits his former psychiatric ward and finds Shepton's book, and later deciphers his code. He calls Faust again and berates him for killing innocent people and taunts him to kill him. Chambers and Mark Hooper's probation officer are identified as two of the victims' body parts. Rose goes to the roof of the police station, walks to the edge of the building, phones Faust and tells him that he would kill himself before Faust gets the chance. Faust threatens to kill Baxter, should Rose kill himself. The kill list is leaked to the media; Hooper's brother Nick evades the police, but later turns himself in after claiming to have seen the killer. Baxter discovers Nick's body after his lawyer's departure. Rose deduces that the lawyer killed him and runs after her and tries to talk her down, but she steps in front of a moving bin lorry and is killed.
3	"Episode 3"	Toby MacDonald	Freddy Syborn	November 25, 2021
Baxter learns that Nick Hooper's lawyer's son was kidnapped and that she was blackmailed into killing Nick. On their way to find her son, she and Rose stumble across a fanatical woman who delivers him a copy of the kill list, while Baxter discovers the lawyer's son in her car. The son is reluctant to speak about his experiences at first, until Rose tells him a story about his mother. Edmunds shares her concerns about Rose with Baxter, who tries to speak to him, but he is vague in his responses. More victims' body parts are identified on the sewn body, while Baxter orders her team to secure the next victim, Eric Turner, who was the guard who tackled Rose at Mark Hooper's trial. Turner doesn't cooperate with Baxter and decides to continue with his job to deliver high-risk prisoners. Baxter and Edmunds escort him, and under a bridge, the van swerves and stops after a bomb detonates. A prisoner, Keith Rackman, to whom Rose spoke for his own investigation, attempts to escape, but is knocked out. Turner opens a bag containing a venomous snake, which ends up killing him. Following an accident at a civil war reenactment, a mysterious man is seen taking a severed hand to study for himself.
4	"Episode 4"	Niall MacCormick	Story by : Freddy Syborn and Florence Keith-Roach	December 2, 2021
Edmunds recovers in hospital after receiving a neck injury. Her ex-girlfriend Hannah shows up because she's still listed as her emergency contact in the hospital information. Baxter is furious with her for not looking after Turner but does not blame her for his death. Baxter and Rose hatch out a plan to save the killer's next victim, judge Matthew Wingate. The investigation also determines that the killer used deepfake voices over the phone. Rose and Baxter plan to stage Wingate's death for the media to see and trick the killer into believing that he's being moved to a safe house. However, the killer is a step ahead of them, having mounted a small camera on Wingate’s dog to survey his house. The day of the event, the killer replaces the fake blood with acid and kills a guarding police officer in the process, having also lured Baxter and Rose away from the house with deepfake voices on their respective phones. Wingate dies from the acid, and Baxter takes the fall despite Rose being willing to do it. The killer later calls him, and Rose notes information from a train station PA and recites his description as learned from a friend of Adam Malik, Teresa Shepton's boyfriend.
5	"Episode 5"	Niall MacCormick	Freddy Syborn and Kara Smith	December 9, 2021
Rose rushes to the station where the killer supposedly recently was, only to find it empty and unaware that Edmunds is tracking him. However, he discovers her tracker later on and decides to use her letter from Hannah as leverage. Baxter focuses the investigation on the next victim, Andrew Daly, whom the police find hard to identify among a pool of many people sharing the same name. She and Finlay chase a lead to Markfield prison, where a break-in occurred just prior to Joel Shepton's death. They learn Shepton's connection to Rose and his subsequent investigation into Theresa Shepton's death, also including Keith Rackman. Edmunds deduces that "Andrew Daly" is, in fact, an anagram of Andrea Wyld, a journalist with whom Rose had a relationship. The police storm her residence, only to find her dead with a scold's bridle over her head and a bloodied Rose beside her. Rose comes clean to Baxter about what he has been doing, including his attempted suicide and investigation into Theresa Shepton's death. Baxter decides to arrest him, but he manages to escape with a reluctant Edmunds' help. The blood on Wingate's dog's collar identifies the killer as Thomas Massey. Edmunds decides to go to question his wife, who was Wyld's makeup artist, but Thomas subdues her.
6	"Episode 6"	Niall MacCormick	Freddy Syborn	December 16, 2021
Massey ties Edmunds up in a makeshift sex dungeon. Baxter dispatches nearby officers to investigate the Massey address, but they find no sign of Edmunds. Baxter and Finlay investigate for themselves and encounter Massey who stabs Finlay before escaping and Edmunds is rescued by Baxter, The police take Joy in for questioning, and the deputy commissioner expresses her will to sacrifice Rose in order to get Massey. Baxter goes on live television and urges people to contact the police if they spot Rose. Shortly after, she is subdued by Massey. Rose arrives and Baxter asks him to handcuff himself to the railing if he loves her, which Rose does, not realising that she's under Massey's control at that point. Massey orders her to inhale paraquat, a powerful weedkiller. Rose attempts to kill himself by bashing his head, in order to prevent Massey from killing Baxter. Rose and Baxter manage to stop Massey, but he escapes again. Massey attempts to escape, but Joy pushes him from a railway station gallery after saying that she was disappointed in him. Three months later, Edmunds' former boss contacts her about Naomi Green's case, hinting that Rose gave him her letter. Meanwhile, Rose is still a wanted man, now seeking refuge in Hamburg, Germany.

== Production ==
=== Development ===
In February 2021, it was announced AMC and Alibi would co-produce a thriller series based upon the novel Ragdoll by Daniel Cole. Freddy Syborn would adapt the series and serve as an executive producer. Production companies involved with the series include Sid Gentle Films and AMC Studios, with BBC Studios distributing worldwide. The series premiered on November 11, 2021, on AMC+ in the United States.

=== Casting ===
In March 2021, Lucy Hale joined the cast of the series in a starring role. In April 2021, Henry Lloyd-Hughes and Thalissa Teixeira joined the cast of the series in starring roles.

=== Filming ===
Principal photography began in London in May 2021.

== Reception ==
The review aggregator website Rotten Tomatoes reports a 90% approval rating with an average rating of 7.9/10, based on 10 critic reviews. The website's critics consensus reads, "Ragdoll avoids feeling like yet another serial killer caper sewn together from better thrillers, thanks in part to its dry humor and killer cast chemistry." On Metacritic, which uses a weighted average, assigned the series a score of 65 out of 100, based on 8 critics, indicating "generally favorable reviews".

Daniel Fienberg, of The Hollywood Reporter, called the series a "metaphor" rather than a TV show, saying that "[it] has enough unnerving moments to satisfy impressionable devotees of the genre."
