= The Last Train (TV series) =

- The superimposed title for The Last Train at the start of episode 2
- Created by: Matthew Graham
- Directed by: Stuart Orme; Alex Pillai
- Starring: Nicola Walker; Christopher Fulford; Steve Huison; Treva Etienne; Amita Dhiri; James Hazeldine; Janet Dale; Zoe Telford; Sacha Dhawan; Dinita Gohil; Ralph Brown; Caroline Carver
- Country of origin: United Kingdom
- Original language: English
- No. of series: 1
- No. of episodes: 6

Production
- Executive producers: Susan Hogg; Simon Lewis
- Producer: Sita Williams
- Running time: approx. 50 minutes
- Production company: Granada Television

Original release
- Network: ITV
- Release: 7 April – 6 May 1999

The Last Train (Cruel Earth in Canada) is a British six-part serial, a post-apocalyptic drama first broadcast on the ITV network in 1999. It has since been repeated on ITV2 in 1999/2001 and on numerous occasions on the UK Sci-Fi Channel. The serial was written by Matthew Graham and produced for ITV by Granada Television.

The series has not been released on DVD or any other format, and has never aired in the US.

== Plot synopsis ==
A random group of individuals on a train travelling between London and Sheffield are cryonically frozen when the train crashes inside a tunnel and a canister of gas being carried by a passenger is released in their carriage. They unfreeze to find the United Kingdom in ruins. Unbeknownst to them, 52 years have passed. They wrongly believe weeks, then months, then just 14 years have passed whilst they were frozen in time before eventually finding out the devastating truth. They are some of the few humans to have survived an apocalyptic asteroid strike and are alone in the British countryside. It is revealed that the passenger with the gas canister, Harriet Ambrose, knew of the incoming asteroid strike and had been on her way to a top-secret government project known as Ark.

Harriet wishes to track down the Ark team to find her boyfriend, scientist Jonathan Geddes. The rest of the group agrees to join her, since it seems like their best chance to find other survivors and a safe haven. On the way, they must deal with the dangers of the post-apocalyptic world, such as feral dog packs and tribes of seemingly hostile humans—children of the few original survivors.

== Cast and crew ==
=== Main characters ===
| Actor/Actress | Character |
|---|---|
| Nicola Walker | Harriet Ambrose, responsible for the accidental freezing of the railway carriage passengers. She emerges as one of the leaders of the group, due to her apparent knowledge of the disaster as a Ministry of Defence scientist with knowledge of Ark. It is later established that she is the girlfriend of Ark's chief scientist, Jonathan Geddes, who has arranged her clearance, as she was not part of the "Facilitating Team" or the "Hibernation Team". |
| Christopher Fulford | Ian Hart, a policeman who boarded the train in a rush to join his wife who was in labour; his wife and child died in the asteroid strike. He has strong feelings for Jandra. |
| Steve Huison | Colin Wallace, a businessman whose sanity soon begins to slip. He has feelings for Roe and tries to kiss, then later to have sex with her. He deliberately locks Mick outside of Ark in the final episode. |
| Treva Etienne | Mick Sizer (Michael Smith), a thief and smooth-talker who becomes a leader of the group. He begins a relationship with Roe, upsetting Colin. |
| Amita Dhiri | Jandra Nixon, she was escaping from an abusive husband with her children, Leo and Anita, and after awakening, connected with Ian. She succumbs to her injuries after Leo, in a rage, causes her to fall into a derelict underground refinery. |
| James Hazeldine | Austin Danforth, an all-round handyman who lost his wife to illness before the asteroid strike. He becomes a father-figure to much of the group. |
| Janet Dale | Jean Wilson, a nurse practitioner who provides basic medical care to the group. |
| Zoe Telford | Roe Germaine, a pregnant girl, approximately 20 years old, on the way to get an abortion. She has a physical relationship with Mick. |
| Sacha Dhawan | Leo Nixon, Jandra's teenaged son, who has misguided anger issues. He refuses to believe his mother regarding his father's abusiveness and later is responsible for Jandra's death, after which he admits to his father's wrongdoing. |
| Dinita Gohil | Anita Nixon, Jandra's young daughter of whom the group is quite protective. She befriends Hild. Many episodes begin or end with her diary-entry narration, a task covered by Leo for the end of episode five, when Hild's "tribe" abducts Anita and Hild. |
| Caroline Carver | Hild, a pregnant teenager who is running from her "tribe" of survivors, who roam the countryside on horseback. She befriends Anita and seems to care about the group. |

=== Supporting cast ===
Ordered alphabetically by actors' surnames

- Guard (Roger Bingham) – Episode 1
- Johnathan Geddes (Ralph Brown), Ark's chief scientist and Harriet's lover, who gave her the cryogenic canister, government clearance, a security badge/swipe card, and directions to meet at his government bunker and later, at Ark. He appears as Harriet remembers him in a video in Episode 2, and in person having aged 40 years at the end of Episode 6.
- Karen (Joy Carradice) – Episode 6
- Mark (Kenneth Colley), Gillian's father and leader of the Mareby village group; he wants Hild and the train group to stay with him and, to that end, sabotages the van – Episode 5
- Darren (Chris Cook)
- Archie (Robert Dunn) – Episode 1
- Danny (Justin Ellery) – Episode 1
- Gillian (Deborah Findlay), Mark's daughter; she's had several still-born babies – Episode 5
- Sam (John Flitcroft) – Episode 1
- Becky (Abigail Hayes) – Episode 1
- Teenager (Chris Hoyle) – Episode 1
- Miss. Eversleigh (Mary Jones)
- Coats (Josh Moran) – Episode 1
- Behemoth (David Nicholls) – Episode 6 (not credited in episode 5)
- Hornrim (Phil Smeeton) – Episode 6 (not credited in episode 5)
- Midwife (Flo Wilson) – Episode 4

== Episodes ==
| No. | Title | Directed by | Original release date |
|---|---|---|---|
| 1 | "Episode One" | Stuart Orme | 7 April 1999 |
On a train heading for Sheffield, only Harriet Ambrose knows what is about to happen: an impending strike by a large asteroid in central Zambia, the impact of which causes sufficient earth tremors in England to derail the train in a tunnel. A canister of cryogenic material is dislodged from Harriet's rucksack and spills its contents into the carriage, causing all the passengers to be cryogenically frozen. Revived some time later, the passengers emerge from the tunnel and begin to explore a very different, post-apocalyptic world. Their new environment begins to show its dangerous nature; two group members are killed and another is separated from the remainder by feral dogs, and corrosive acid rain forces the other survivors to take shelter. The last shot of this episode shows a rough gravestone dated March 2012, the first sign that the survivors have been frozen at least 13 years longer than their estimate of 'weeks'.
| 2 | "Episode Two" | Stuart Orme | 8 April 1999 |
The group heads into the city to find a government bunker where Harriet hopes to find her lover, a scientist named Jonathan Geddes, and essential supplies, but all the supplies are gone, as is Jonathan, who has left behind a cryptic message for Harriet divulging the location of Ark. Roe attempts to abort her unborn child in a church rather than bring it into such a harsh world, but she is startled by the appearance of Hild, a young pregnant survivor who she scares off. Anita later befriends Hild, while Colin evades a less peaceful male survivor from Hild's "tribe." Colin finds another grave, dated 2013, and informs the group they were frozen at least 14 years, not several weeks.
| 3 | "Episode Three" | Alex Pillai | 15 April 1999 |
The group heads north seeking Ark but is side-tracked when they see what they believe is a signal from other survivors. However, it leads only to a long-abandoned farmhouse. Finding a fresh water supply, the group wishes to stay, but Harriet sabotages the well, thus forcing them to move on. The van crashes while chasing a wild boar, and then several of the men follow the boar's squeals into a derelict underground refinery. Meanwhile, Hild catches up to them on horseback, and speaking almost exclusively in sign language to Anita identifies herself as Hild. A panther attacks the men during the boar hunt but it is ultimately defeated, and the boar is caught. After feasting on their first meal in the harsh new world, Jandra and Ian share an intimate moment. Her son stumbles upon them, and in a misguided display of rage, Leo lashes out then watches, distraught, as his mother falls down a deep pit into the refinery.
| 4 | "Episode Four" | Alex Pillai | 22 April 1999 |
Jandra is in a critical condition after falling into the underground refinery, and the group (minus Leo and Hild) is forced to take cover by her side when the acid rain resumes. We discover that Hild is able to speak perfect English, and she feigns choking in order to persuade a still deeply upset Leo to rescue her, igniting his passion to successfully help the others. The group continues towards Ark, but the journey is again upset by the greatly swollen River Tees, although Hild shows them a deserted holiday camp where they find a boat, guarded by three strangers. The group is fired upon, Harriet is forced to kill a man, and the group successfully commandeers the boat. Upon arrival back at the van, they discover Jandra has died, but their mourning is interrupted by the arrival of more men on horseback, who open fire. The group is forced to flee, although no one further is injured thanks to the actions of Hild (whom the survivors seem reluctant to fire upon). Hild now joins the group on their quest to find Ark.
| 5 | "Episode Five" | Alex Pillai | 29 April 1999 |
The train group plus Hild, fleeing from the armed horsemen of Hild's "tribe", cross the boundaries marked by plague warnings to take refuge in a seemingly deserted, though well-maintained, village. They discover the village is inhabited by a man named Mark and his daughter Gillian, who have survived the apocalypse by hiding down a mine shaft, and who provide a definitive current date – it is now 2050 A.D. Whilst everyone celebrates with the alcohol and amenities offered by the local pub, Harriet uncovers the villagers' true nature before she is knocked unconscious and the van burnt. Meanwhile, Mick and Roe make love, observed by Colin, who later becomes disillusioned and attempts to have sex with her. The train group discovers the burning van just as the tribesmen on horseback return, held at bay by Mick and Colin until everyone is safely in the church. Once everyone has retreated inside, they discover the church is a shrine to babies, as everyone in the village was left sterile 16 years after the strike, making Hild's pregnancy (and Roe's hidden pregnancy) unique. The riders demand the return of Hild, who leaves willingly in order to save the train group and villagers, but Anita runs to Hild and is abducted with her. Leo continues his sister's diary as the group leaves the village, on foot now, with the dual purpose of finding Ark and rescuing Anita.
| 6 | "Episode Six" | Stuart Orme | 6 May 1999 |
Anita continues her diary, 36 days after the events of episode five. The train group finally arrives at Ark only to find it apparently empty, and with Hild's "tribe" (holding Hild, in early stages of childbirth, and Anita) in close pursuit. Whilst the train group finds and enters Ark, Austin is captured, and a jealous Colin seals Ark's door before Mick can enter. The tribesmen, wanting medical supplies for the delivery of Hild's baby, crucify Mick and Austin in an effort to make the train group open Ark. Harriet sets off deeper into Ark and finally reunites with a very old Jonathan, who emerged from hibernation 42 years earlier – along with all others in Ark – just nine years after the asteroid strike. She helps her now frail lover by smothering him to death. Leo, Ian, and Roe finally open Ark so that they can save Mick and Austin, and the tribesmen justify their harsh justice as critically important to save Hild's baby – and now Roe's – for the future of mankind. The missing Ark survivors are revealed to be the ancestors of Hild's tribe; thus, the people that the train group have been running from are the very people they've been looking for. All the survivors come together as Hild gives birth to a healthy baby girl.

== Production ==
In Canada, the series aired under its working title: Cruel Earth.

The series was written by Matthew Graham, who went on to co-create and write Life on Mars, its spin-off Ashes to Ashes, and the short-lived Bonekickers. He also wrote the episode "Fear Her" for the 2006 series of Doctor Who, as well as two episodes of Hustle.

Settings:

- The railway depot shown in the programme, that is said to be Sheffield railway station, is in fact the derelict Manchester Mayfield railway station in Manchester.
- The church in episode 2 is Gorton Monastery.
- The camp in episode 4 is an old Pontin's holiday camp in Prestatyn, North Wales (Tower Beach Holiday Camp).
- The village "Mareby" in episode 5 is Wardle, a small village in Greater Manchester, near Littleborough and Rochdale.
- The Ark structure featured in episode 6 was Thorpe Marsh Power Station, located five miles northeast of Doncaster; it was undergoing demolition at the time.

In the United States, the Fox Network purchased the rights to produce a new version of the series soon after its original 1999 UK transmission. Retitled The Ark, the idea did not progress beyond the pilot stage.
