= Jamestown (TV series) =

British drama television series

- Genre: Historical drama
- Created by: Bill Gallagher
- Starring: Naomi Battrick; Sophie Rundle; Niamh Walsh; Max Beesley; Jason Flemyng; Dean Lennox Kelly; Shaun Dooley; Gwilym Lee; Luke Roskell; Stuart Martin; Burn Gorman; Abubakar Salim; Abiola Ogunbiyi
- Country of origin: United Kingdom
- Original language: English
- No. of series: 3
- No. of episodes: 24

Production
- Executive producers: Richard Fell, Bill Gallagher, Nigel Marchant, Gareth Neame
- Producer: Sue de Beauvoir
- Production company: Carnival Films

Original release
- Network: Sky 1
- Release: 5 May 2017 – 14 June 2019

Jamestown is a British drama television series, written by Bill Gallagher and produced by Carnival Films, an NBC Universal International Television Production company, the makers of Downton Abbey. Set in 1619–1622, Jamestown follows the first English settlers as they establish a community in the New World. Among those landing onshore are a group of women destined to be married to the men of Jamestown, including three spirited women. The series premiered on Sky One in the United Kingdom in May 2017. Sky ordered a second series of Jamestown in May 2017, before the premiere of the first series. Series 2 aired from February 2018. The renewal of Jamestown for a third and final season was announced by Sky One on 23 March 2018.

== Summary ==
In 1619, twelve years after men founded the colony of Jamestown in 1607, women arrive from England duty bound to marry the men who have paid for their passage. Among the women are Jocelyn, Alice and Verity, who arrive with little idea of what the future holds or the disruption they are about to bring to the settlement. The new Governor, Sir George Yeardley, and his wife also arrive and discover that running the settlement is not without problems with a Company Secretary trying to undermine his position.

== Cast and characters ==
- Naomi Battrick as Jocelyn Woodbryg – Betrothed and married to Samuel Castell
- Sophie Rundle as Alice Kett – Farm girl betrothed to Henry Sharrow but married to his brother Silas
- Niamh Walsh as Verity Bridges – Betrothed and unofficially married to Meredith Rutter
- Max Beesley as Henry Sharrow – Eldest brother of the three Sharrows
- Gwilym Lee as Samuel Castell – Recorder to the Virginia Company of London in Jamestown (Series 1)
- Jason Flemyng as Sir George Yeardley – Virginia Company of London Lieutenant-Governor and later Governor
- Claire Cox as Temperance Flowerdew, Lady Yeardley – Wife of Sir George Yeardley
- Dean Lennox Kelly as Meredith Rutter – Owner of the tavern of Jamestown
- Shaun Dooley as Reverend Michaelmas Whitaker (Series 1)
- Stuart Martin as Silas Sharrow – Middle brother of the three Sharrows
- Steven Waddington as Thomas Redwick – Marshal of Jamestown
- Matt Stokoe as James Read – Blacksmith/swordsmith/farrier/forger/craftsman
- Burn Gorman as Nicholas Farlow – Secretary of the Virginia Company of London in Jamestown
- Luke Roskell as Pepper Sharrow – Youngest of the three Sharrow brothers
- Ben Starr as Dr Christopher Priestley – Physician/surgeon/apothecary
- Tony Pitts as Edgar Massinger – Land owner and tobacco grower (Series 1–2)
- Patsy Ferran as Mercy Myrtle – Servant girl of Samuel Castell and maid to Jocelyn Woodbryg
- Kalani Queypo as Chacrow – Native Indian go-between the settlers and Pamunkey Indians
- Raoul Trujillo as Opechancanough – Chief or King of the Pamunkey Tribe
- Abubakar Salim as Pedro – Kingdom of Kongo Angolan warrior who is captured and sold into chattel slavery by the Portuguese but captive by the English (Series 2–3)
- Abiola Ogunbiyi as Maria – Kingdom of Kongo Angolan married with children who is captured and sold into chattel slavery by the Portuguese but captive by the English (Series 2–3)
- Rachel Colwell as Winganuske – Chacrow's sister married to Henry Sharrow as a gift (Series 2–3)
- Ben Batt as Willmus Crabtree – A mysterious trader from England with his motives and intentions unknown (Series 3)
- Harry Grasby as Tamlin Appleday – One of the boys sent from England by the company to work the fields (Series 3)

== Production ==
Most of the series was filmed in Vértesacsa, Hungary.

== Episodes ==
| Series | Episodes | Originally released | |
| Series | Episodes | First released | Last released |
|---|---|---|---|
| 1 | 8 | 5 May 2017 | 23 June 2017 |
| 2 | 8 | 9 February 2018 | 23 March 2018 |
| 3 | 8 | 26 April 2019 | 14 June 2019 |

=== Series 1 (2017) ===
| No. overall | No. in series | Title | Directed by | Written by | Original release date | UK viewers (millions) |
|---|---|---|---|---|---|---|
| 1 | 1 | "Episode 1" | John Alexander | Bill Gallagher | 5 May 2017 | 0.6 |
In 1619, three women, Alice, Verity, and Jocelyn, arrive aboard a ship from England at the Virginian colony of Jamestown. They meet the men they are expected to marry. Farm girl Alice is met by the handsome Silas, but it is his elder brother Henry, a violent and brutal farmer, who has paid to marry her. Fiery Verity meets her new husband having his ear nailed to the town stocks. He is a drunkard and owner of the local tavern. Upper class Jocelyn, who confessed to Alice on the voyage she had killed a man in England, is betrothed to the company recorder and soon becomes embroiled in the local politics of tobacco selling. Silas and Henry go up river to buy corn from the Indians. Silas returns alone leaving Henry for dead after an explosion on one of their canoes.
| 2 | 2 | "Episode 2" | John Alexander | Bill Gallagher | 12 May 2017 | N/A |
Henry Sharrow believed dead, blacksmith James Read seeks to marry Alice as does Silas whom she prefers. Marshall Redwick and Farlow, unable to punish Jocelyn, use the example of Verity's irreverence to punish her in the stocks. Verity curses the marshall who comes down with sickness and she is suspected of witchcraft. Another man dies of sickness and Mercy also becomes ill, but Doctor Priestley saves her with Indian medicine. The Reverend Michaelmas Whitaker accuses Verity of witchcraft and Jocelyn plots to save her and prevent Alice from being blackmailed into marrying Read. The doctor searches for the cause of the sickness.
| 3 | 3 | "Episode 3" | San Donovan | Bill Gallagher | 19 May 2017 | N/A |
A native American is caught trying to steal shot and powder for a musket secretly sold to them. Silas is accused of trading the musket. Jocelyn suggests the captive be returned as a sign of goodwill with Samuel accompanying Governor Yeardley. Marshall Redwick and Farlow see an opportunity to restore military rule if the native does not survive the journey. Alice is convinced James Read knows who sold the musket but he is reluctant to help her because of his love for her. Negotiations with the natives do not go well as the natives realise the arrival of women to Jamestown means the settlers intend to stay. Henry Sharrow has survived with care from the natives and meets another colonist, Davey McDurran believed dead, living with the natives.
| 4 | 4 | "Episode 4" | San Donovan | Bill Gallagher | 26 May 2017 | N/A |
Alice and Silas marry. Rumours of a gold map leading to a Portuguese mine stirs Jocelyn to force a reluctant Samuel to help her find the map. Farlow and Redwick seek to discover a relationship between Jocelyn and Doctor Priestley by having one of their men extract information from Mercy. Verity challenges husband Meredith to give up drink for a month. James Read clashes with the governor over his refusal to allow him to marry Alice and suffers a harsh punishment. The doctor declares his love for Jocelyn who has made an enemy of the governor's wife.
| 5 | 5 | "Episode 5" | Paul Wilmhurst | Bill Gallagher | 2 June 2017 | N/A |
Governor Yeardley is taken ill and Jocelyn sees an opportunity for her husband as does the Marshall and Farlow. Silas's cow is killed. Verity is blamed when she is accused of inflaming passions between Fletcher and Baily who kills Fletcher. Henry Sharrow and Davey McDurran search for gold. Jocelyn fears the governor's wife and a letter she is expecting from England revealing her secret; a secret she confides to Doctor Priestley who confesses his love for her. James Read discovers Henry Sharrow is alive. Verity hears of an uprising amongst the soldiers against Yeardley.
| 6 | 6 | "Episode 6" | Paul Wilmhurst | Bill Gallagher | 9 June 2017 | N/A |
Silas searches for his brother Henry; Alice asks James Read to make her a dagger. Temperance Yeardley organises the St John's Eve celebration and Jocelyn sees a way to ingratiate herself. Verity starts stealing property from Farlow and Redwick to her husband's shock. Henry Sharrow and Davey McDurran find silver. When a box belonging to the governor goes missing Temperance seeks its recovery from Verity and finds her with Jocelyn. Henry Sharrow returns to Jamestown.
| 7 | 7 | "Episode 7" | David Moore | Bill Gallagher | 16 June 2017 | N/A |
Henry Sharrow believes his silver find gives him great power. Verity supports Alice, who fears Henry, in her claim of rape and Farlow and Redwick seek to turn the claim to their advantage. Jocelyn has discovered a secret of the governor and blackmails Temperance to hand over the letter she is expecting. Silas returns to Jamestown and is rejected by his brother and Alice who feels betrayed by him. James Read refines the silver and Doctor Priestley's test of the silver's provenance results in the tables being turned on Henry Sharrow, Governor Yeardley, and Jocelyn.
| 8 | 8 | "Episode 8" | David Moore | Bill Gallagher | 23 June 2017 | N/A |
A ship docks with new settlers, orders from the Virginia Company, and the letter Temperance is expecting. Jocelyn fears she will hang. Verity reveals to her husband they are not married and will board the ship to make her way home back to England. Redwick and Farlow's position is undermined when the orders from the company dictate the governor institute a form of democracy. Samuel discovers Redwick and Farlow's fraud against the company. Alice and Verity determine to help Jocelyn but Alice makes the situation worse. The ship's captain bring news to Redwick and Farlow's advantage who order manacles from James Read. The Sharrows are threatened ruin by Massinger. Temperance is shocked by her husband's actions that reflect on her decision about Jocelyn. The first democratic vote is held to thwart Massinger.

=== Series 2 (2018) ===
| No. overall | No. in series | Title | Directed by | Written by | Original release date | UK viewers (millions) |
|---|---|---|---|---|---|---|
| 9 | 1 | "Episode 1" | Paul Wilmhurst | Bill Gallagher | 9 February 2018 | N/A |
In 1620, Alice gives birth to a son, the first of the colony, whom she names Silas despite pressures to name him James. Maria and Pedro handle their enslavement in different ways; Maria vows to return to her country and refuses to accept the ways of the colony whilst Pedro decides he needs Yeardley to purchase him in order to eventually gain his freedom. Silas and Henry find the body of Samuel Castel by the river, leaving Jocelyn a widow. Meredith admits to Verity that he saw Samuel before his death who told him he was on governor's business but he is reluctant to tell for fear of repercussions. Jocelyn and Mercy are evicted from their home, causing Mercy to find a rosary and suspect Samuel of being a Catholic but they both struggle to believe it is true. Jocelyn nearly puts the rosary in Samuel's casket but is advised not to by James Reed. At Samuel's funeral, Yeardley demands the casket is opened, causing Jocelyn to suspect someone planted the rosary. Her suspicious are confirmed when she finds out Yeardley received an anonymous tip to check the coffin. She offers to trade the information of who the real Catholic spy is in exchange for her return home.
| 10 | 2 | "Episode 2" | Paul Wilmhurst | Bill Gallagher | 9 February 2018 | N/A |
Jocelyn reveals to Governor Yeardley that Doctor Priestly is the papist spy. Yeardley returns her house and instructs Jocelyn to remain close to the Doctor. Verity wants a baby but her drunken husband Meredith is unable to oblige. Alice is ill with worry when she finds Silas is secretly talking to the native Indians. Meredith buys smuggled goods from a ship's crew docked at the quay. Pedro seeks Jocelyn's help by way of James the blacksmith, and she engineers a plot to arrange his change of ownership to Governor Yeardley. Silas and Henry capture one of the smugglers; Farlow interrogates him and kills him, accusing him as the murderer of Samuel Castel.
| 11 | 3 | "Episode 3" | David Evans | Bill Gallagher | 16 February 2018 | N/A |
Believing Priestley to be the papist spy, Yeardley continues to use Jocelyn as his spy. Alice falls asleep, and her baby is taken. Henry and Silas believe the native Indians have taken the baby to force Silas to act for them and go to the Indian village. Maria, who had lost her own children, as had the Marshal, are also suspected. Yeardley raises a Militia to confront the Indians egged on by the Marshal. Dismayed at the continual arrival of more English settlers, the Indians see another way when Chacrow suggests giving one of his sisters to Henry Sharrow as a bride. The baby is found floating down the river in a small canoe.
| 12 | 4 | "Episode 4" | David Evans | Bill Gallagher | 23 February 2018 | N/A |
Henry Sharrow is married to Chacrow's sister Winganuske. A wife for James Read arrives by ship, but the journey has taken its toll. Henry learns his new wife is not pure, she having been with other Pawmunkey men, and agrees to Governor Yeardley's plan, devised by Jocelyn, to get the Indian chief into his debt. Silas warns Chacrow of the plan. Read falls afoul of the governor for wearing clothes above his station and is publicly whipped by the Marshal. Chacrow turns the governor's plan on its head. Yeardley expects Jocelyn to spend the night with Doctor Priestley to discover evidence that he is the papist spy. Verity and Meredith have the stolen ship goods taken by Massinger. Mercy tells Jocelyn she and Read saw her enter the Doctor's home.
| 13 | 5 | "Episode 5" | Andy Hay | Bill Gallagher | 2 March 2018 | N/A |
Farlow returns from Bermuda with effeminate Simeon Peck, an alchemist, with promises to turn lead into gold. Governor Yeardley is convinced, but Redwick the marshal is not. Jocelyn seeks to gain an advantage from the situation. Verity makes fun of Peck's proclivities. The marshal lays down the law regarding sodomy. Alice forges a reconciliation between her husband and James Read. Jocelyn confides to Doctor Priestley that she told Yeardley he is the papist spy, but she learns Yeardley already knows who the spy is. The alchemist's transmutation is not what is expected. The Sharrows are angry when their tobacco cargo is stolen by privateers but Yeardley's cargo remains untouched.
| 14 | 6 | "Episode 6" | Andy Hay | Bill Gallagher | 9 March 2018 | N/A |
The Sharrows march on Jamestown with other disgruntled settlers. Yeardley quells the uprising with a document proclaiming an imminent Spanish invasion. An eclipse forebodes impending doom as the settlement prepares for war. Massinger is found by Mercy blind. The spectral corpse of Samuel Castell is seen in Jamestown. Jocelyn finds her wedding ring on her pillow. The Sharrows accuse Massinger of arranging the theft of their cargo. Yeardley believes Massinger is the spy and the killer of Samuel, whose body is exhumed. Massinger faces a test of God's judgement that Jocelyn must face as well. Jocelyn insists that Massinger take the test again. Massinger is hanged, but Verity has the final action.
| 15 | 7 | "Episode 7" | Bill Gallagher | Bill Gallagher | 16 March 2018 | N/A |
Yeardley expects Pedro to breed with Maria and Jocelyn to accept Dr Priestley's proposal of marriage. The Sharrows take Massinger's slaves in lieu of their stolen cargo. Mrs Yeardley gives cause to Maria to stab Pedro and flee the settlement. Jocelyn seeks a secret pact with Farlow to obtain Massinger's land. Chacrow finds Maria and takes her to Alice who hides her to Silas's dismay. Rutter becomes obsessed with a passage from the Bible. Maria runs to Verity and Read finds the injured Pedro. Maria and Pedro start back for the settlement and are found by Henry Sharrow who puts them in chains to earn favour with Yeardley. Maria is punished by branding. Jocelyn is shamed by the settlement for refusing to remarry and she seeks consolation with James Read.
| 16 | 8 | "Episode 8" | Bill Gallagher | Bill Gallagher | 23 March 2018 | N/A |
Jocelyn blackmails Yeardley into giving her Massinger's land: land he wanted. Yeardley plans to burn Jocelyn's tobacco crop and blame the Pamunkey to take their land: a plan Farlow disagrees with. Verity gets her own revenge on Marshal Redwick to her and her husband's benefit. Doctor Priestley orders two rapiers from James Read as he challenges him to a duel. Jocelyn offers James Read an overseer's position. Alice tells Chacrow of Yeardley's plan. Jocelyn's crop is fired, Silas flees to the Pamunkey as he is considered a traitor by the settlers. Yeardley orders Henry to return his brother while Yeardley organises an attack on the Pamunkey.

=== Series 3 (2019) ===
| No. overall | No. in series | Title | Directed by | Written by | Original release date | UK viewers (millions) |
|---|---|---|---|---|---|---|
| 17 | 1 | "Episode 1" | Andy Hay | Bill Gallagher | 26 April 2019 | N/A |
In 1622, Silas has fully integrated into the Pamunkey after his betrayal of the Jamestown settlement, with him adopting the name Kukupunkway. Alice's pleas for his life with the governor fall on deaf ears. Governor Yeardley is more concerned with the scheming of Secretary Farlow and widow Jocelyn, who wants new riverside land that she knows the governor will deny her. Maria goes to the governor's wife with a vision of Yeardley holding a severed head. Yeardley uses Alice in a plan to trap Silas and she makes a life-changing decision.
| 18 | 2 | "Episode 2" | Andy Hay | Bill Gallagher | 3 May 2019 | N/A |
Instead of men from Africa the company sends boys from England to work the fields. Tamlin Appleday is assigned to Jocelyn and proves a disruptive influence forcing her to dismiss him. Henry's baby falls sick and despite his wife's pleading to let her be treated by the Pamunkey healer he takes her to Doctor Priestley whose Bloodletting by Leeches treatment fails to save the baby. Meredith Rutter believes Appleday is his lost son and Verity is happy, even after the boy attacks her with a knife, in the change in her husband. Jocelyn seeks an agreement for the Pamunkey boys to work her fields.
| 19 | 3 | "Episode 3" | Jon East | Bill Gallagher | 10 May 2019 | N/A |
Silas prepares a bear trap to kill Yeardley without Opechancanough's permission. Maria fears Pedro will kill Yeardley who has separated them and plans with Verity to leave Jamestown with a reluctant Pedro on a ship. Opechancanough plans to infiltrate his tribe into the lives of the English using Jocelyn proposal of work. The trap fails and Yeardley demands Silas be exiled. Fearing Maria and Pedro's escape is known Verity seeks to warn them.
| 20 | 4 | "Episode 4" | Jon East | Bill Gallagher | 17 May 2019 | N/A |
Rutter wakes in a field from a drunken stupor and sees a golden horse. Yeardley and Jocelyn want the horse and the townsfolk including James Read begin a search. The horse becomes a pawn in which Henry Sharrow seeks a pardon for his brother Silas, exiled from the Pamunkey for disobeying Opechancanough. The chief plans to infiltrate the English and tells Chacrow to become Yeardley's man. Jocelyn uses Verity to recover a promissory note from Crabtree, who she believes to be an agent of the company. The plan goes wrong and she discovers Crabtree could be the most powerful man in Jamestown.
| 21 | 5 | "Episode 5" | Sarah Gorman | Bill Gallagher | 24 May 2019 | N/A |
Opechancanough orders Chacrow to kill Silas Sharrow which Chacrow confides to Silas. Jocelyn tells James Read that Crabtree's power resides in a ring he has and she is determined to have it. Yeardley, not trusting Chacrow, asks Silas to show him how gunpowder is made. Winganuske returns to her husband Henry Sharrow. Verity shames her husband, Rutter, over his treatment of the boy Tamlin. That night in great remorse he falls from the fort ramparts just as Chacrow is carrying out his chief's order and Jocelyn, after drugging Crabtree, discovers his ring and waits for him to awake.
| 22 | 6 | "Episode 6" | Sarah Gorman | Bill Gallagher | 31 May 2019 | N/A |
Pedro finds a broken timepiece that belonged to Crabtree which James Read repairs. Pedro discovers from Doctor Priestley that Yeardley has bequeathed him and Maria to his children and they realise that they will never be free. Marshall Redwick arrests Crabtree. From his prison cell Crabtree concocts a plan using Jocelyn to depose Yeardley by finding ship wrecked mariners, hiding in Virginia, who brought the slaves illegally to Jamestown. Pedro and Jocelyn head up river followed by Read and Verity to find the seamen. Maria plans to drive Yeardley mad while Opechancanough plans for war.
| 23 | 7 | "Episode 7" | Bill Gallagher | Bill Gallagher | 7 June 2019 | N/A |
James Read and Verity find Jocelyn and Pedro's empty boat and Jocelyn nearby badly wounded and Pedro in hiding. Yeardley has drug induced nightmares administered by Maria and Yeardley's wife who wished to return to England. Yeardley is alerted by Redwick who suspects the Doctor has provided the drug and also conspired to let Crabtree escape his cell. The plan to find the mariners prove futile as Yeardley had warned them. One is killed by Henry Sharrow as he was about to silence Maria. Pepper Sharrow kills a native from a rival tribe and Chacrow buries him.
| 24 | 8 | "Episode 8" | Bill Gallagher | Bill Gallagher | 14 June 2019 | N/A |
Opechancanough's war plans move forward to rid Virginia of the English but Yeardley ignores the signs. Mercy marries Pepper Sharrow and Jocelyn declares her love to James Read when she learns he has sold his blacksmith's and intends to leave. Verity finds Tamlin living rough near the township. Crabtree reappears in his prison cell to inform Yeardley a new governor is on his way. Maria tries to warn Pedro of the attack. Opechancanough's co-ordinated land and river attack begins and Chacrow warns the Sharrows to flee to Jamestown as hundreds of settlers are killed in the countryside.

== Reviews ==
The Guardian said the show was an expensive soap opera, but found the show to be fun. A critic with the Financial Times questioned the accuracy of the show, especially its portrait of women. The Irish Times found that everything in the show is "absurd, generic or risible". The Telegraph was kinder to the show, as it found the show to be a "silly but gripping period drama".
