= World Productions =

Film production company

World Productions Limited
- Formerly: Ashloft Limited (Mar–Sep 1990); Island World Productions Limited (1990–1994)
- Type: Subsidiary
- Industry: Television
- Founded: March 20, 1990; 36 years ago in London, England
- Headquarters: London
- Services: Production company
- Parent: ITV Studios (2017–present)
- Website: world-productions.com

World Productions Limited is a British television production company, founded on 20 March 1990 by producer Tony Garnett, and became a part of ITV Studios following a takeover in 2017.

== History ==
The company's first major series was the police drama Between the Lines (BBC1, 1992–94), and throughout the decade they went on to produce a succession of drama series. The most notable of these include This Life (BBC2, 1996–97), about a group of young law graduates in London; vampire-based thriller Ultraviolet (Channel 4, 1998); and a police series for the BBC, The Cops (BBC2, 1998–99), which was so controversial in its depiction of the police force that official police advice was withdrawn for the second series.

More recently, the company has made the series No Angels (2004–2006), a drama based around the lives of young nurses, and Goldplated for Channel 4. For Channel Five, it produced the Perfect Day trilogy and Tripping Over, a co-production with Network Ten in Australia. It also co-produced a one-off This Life + 10 reunion special with BBC Wales, transmitted in early 2007.

=== Marcus Evans takeover ===
It was announced in February 2012 that the company had been taken over by Marcus Evans Entertainment owned by billionaire businessman and owner of Ipswich Town F.C., Marcus Evans. Evans's company had been looking to get involved with television and film production for a number of years beforehand, and in 2010, set up its own production operation, Marcus Evans Entertainment.

=== Takeover by ITV plc ===
In May 2017, ITV plc acquired a majority stake in World Productions. As a result of the deal, World Productions became a unit of ITV Studios and ITV Studios Global Entertainment began distributing all future series internationally.

In 2018, the series finale of World Productions-produced Bodyguard became the BBC's most-watched drama since 2008, and the most-watched drama on British television overall since 2011, achieving an average of 10.4 million viewers.

== Filmography ==
Year(s)	Television title	Television channel
2027	Bad Blood	ITV
2027	Sutherland	BBC One
2027	The Boys from Brazil	Netflix
2026	The Party	ITV
2026	Grams	BBC One
2025	The Bombing of Pan Am 103	Netflix & BBC One
2024	Until I Kill You	ITV
2024	The Gathering	Channel 4
2023–2025	Malpractice	ITV
2023	Fifteen Love	Prime Video
2023	The Hunt For Raoul Moat	ITV
2022–present	Karen Pirie	ITV
2022	The Suspect	ITV
2021	The Diplomat	Alibi
2021–2024	Showtrial	BBC One
2021–present	Vigil	BBC One
2021	The Pembrokeshire Murders	ITV
2019	Anne	ITV
2018	Bodyguard	BBC One
2018–2019	The Bletchley Circle: San Francisco	ITV, City
2018–2020	Save Me	Sky Atlantic
2017	Born to Kill	Channel 4
2016	In Plain Sight	ITV
2016	Dark Angel	ITV
2016	The Secret Agent	BBC One
2015	Code of a Killer	ITV
2014	Playhouse Presents: Nightshift	Sky Arts
2013	The Great Train Robbery	BBC One
2012	The Fear	Channel 4
2012–2014	The Bletchley Circle	ITV
2012–2026	Line of Duty	BBC Two/BBC One
2011	United	BBC Two
2010	Pulse	BBC Three
2008	Hancock and Joan	BBC Four
2008	Never Better	BBC Two
2007	Saddam's Tribe: Bound by Blood	Channel 4
2007	Rough Diamond	BBC One
2007	Party Animals	BBC Two
2007	Lilies	BBC One
2007	This Life + 10	BBC Two
2006	Goldplated	Channel 4
2006	Perfect Day: The Funeral	Channel 5
2006	Perfect Day: The Millennium	Channel 5
2005	Perfect Day: The Wedding	Channel 5
2005	Ahead of the Class	ITV
2004	Murder Prevention	Channel 5
2004	Outlaws	BBC Three
2004–2006	No Angels	Channel 4
2003	Love Again	BBC Two
2003	Buried	Channel 4
2002	Trance	Sky
2001	Table 12	BBC Two
2001	Men Only	Channel 4
2000	Black Cab	BBC Two
2000–2002	Attachments	BBC Two
2000	Rough Treatment	ITV
1998–2000	The Cops	BBC Two
1998	Ultraviolet	Channel 4
1997	The Heart Surgeon	BBC One
1997	Hostile Waters	HBO & BBC
1996	Sharman	Carlton
1996–1997	This Life	BBC Two
1996–2001	Ballykissangel	BBC One
1995	Christmas	Channel 4
1995	Guardians	Channel 4
1995	Holed	Channel 4
1995	Beautiful Thing	Film4
1995	The Turnaround	Carlton
1995	The Caribou Kitchen	CITV
1994–1996	Cardiac Arrest	BBC One
1993	Wide-Eyed and Legless	BBC One
1992–1994	Between the Lines	BBC One
1992	JUICE	Paramount
1991	Reconstructed Heart	

== Awards ==
- 2012

-Royal Television Society – Midlands (2012) -Winner – Best Drama – Line of Duty -Winner – Best Acting Performance (Male) – Lennie James -Winner – Best Newcomer (Acting Performance) Gregory Piper

- 2011

-United -Prix Europa Nomination Best Drama

- 2009

-Hancock and Joan -BAFTA Nomination – Best Single Drama -BAFTA Nomination – Best Actor – Ken Stott -BAFTA Nomination – Best Actress – Maxine Peake -Broadcast Awards Finalist – Best Single Drama

- 2008

-Party Animals -Broadcast Press Guild Nomination – Best Drama Series

- 2007

-Perfect Day -Rose D'Or Nomination – Best Comedy

- 2005

-Outlaws -BAFTA Nomination – Best Drama Serial

-Ahead of the Class -Broadcast Awards Nomination – Best Single Drama -RTS Awards Nomination – Best Actress – Julia Walters -RTS Awards Nomination – Best Single Drama

-No Angels -Indie Awards Nomination – Best Drama Series

- 2004

-Murder Prevention -RTS Craft and Design Award – Best Sound

-Love Again -RTS Awards Nomination – Best Single Drama -BANFF Awards Nomination – Best Single Drama

- 2003

-Buried -BAFTA Award – Best Drama Series

- 2002

-Men Only -BAFTA Nomination – Best New Writer

- 2001

-The Cops -BAFTA Nomination – Best Drama Series

-World Productions -won BAFTA Television Craft Award Special Achievement Award

- 2000

-The Cops -BAFTA TV Award – Best Drama Series

- 1999

-The Cops -BAFTA TV awards – Best Drama Series -RTS Awards – Best Drama Series

- 1998

-Ballykissangel -Broadcasting Press Guild – Best Actor – Tony Doyle

-This Life -RTS Television Award – Best Drama Series -BAFTA TV Award – Best Actress – Daniela Nardini

- 1997

-This Life -The Writers' Guild of Great Britain – Best Original TV Drama Series -South Bank Show Award for TV Drama

- 1996

-Ballykissangel -Royal Television Society – Best Drama Series -National TV Awards – Most Popular Actress – Dervla Kirwin

- 1994

-Cardiac Arrest -BAFTA Nomination – Best Editing

-Between The Lines -BAFTA Award – Best Drama

- 1993

-Between The Lines -Writer's Guild of Great Britain Award – Best Drama Series

- 1992

-Between The Lines -Broadcasting Press Guild – Best Drama Series
