= Mick Ford =

British actor and writer

Mick Ford (born 1 August 1952) is a British actor, screenwriter and playwright, best known for his portrayal of intellectual convict Archer in the cinema version of Scum.

== Early life and education ==
Ford was born on 1 August 1952 in Croydon, Surrey. His father, Noel Ford, fought on the front lines as a Desert Rat during World War II. He attended John Ruskin Grammar School as a teenager and later joined the National Youth Theatre, where he appeared in numerous plays, including the premiere of Zigger Zagger.

== Career ==
After appearing in the 1978 film The Sailor's Return, Ford's best known role came in the 1979 film Scum. Set in a borstal, Ford plays the inmate Archer, an intelligent vegetarian trouble-maker who just wants to serve his time "In (his) own little way". Ford also had a role that year in the television film The Knowledge (for which he also performed the title song) in which he stars as an unemployed man who is encouraged by his girlfriend (Kim Taylforth) to apply to the Metropolitan Police Public Carriage Office to become a black cab driver. In 1980 he was the main character in the European TV-miniseries Caleb Williams by Herbert Wise. He also appeared opposite Trevor Howard in the film Light Years Away (1981), and appeared in the play, The Promise. His later film roles include Kim (1984), The Fourth Protocol (1987), and How to Get Ahead in Advertising (1989) .

Ford is also a writer. He wrote episodes of William and Mary, Ashes to Ashes and several Netflix miniseries adaptations of Harlan Coben's novels. In 2010, Ford wrote the four-part drama Single Father, starring David Tennant. In 2017, Ford adapted the memoir The Boy with the Topknot into a BBC TV movie. In 2024, ITV broadcast Ford's crime mystery thriller series After the Flood.

== Personal life ==
Ford was married to the director of St Pancras Community Centre, Ruth Roberts, with whom he had two children. Roberts died in September 2010. He later married former actress Rudi Davies, whose mother was novelist Beryl Bainbridge.
