= Devil's Pass =

2013 found footage horror film directed by Renny Harlin

- Film poster
- Directed by: Renny Harlin
- Written by: Vikram Weet
- Produced by: Alexander Rodnyansky; Sergei Bespalov; Sergey Melkumov; Renny Harlin; Kia Jam
- Starring: Holly Goss; Matt Stokoe; Luke Albright; Ryan Hawley; Gemma Atkinson
- Cinematography: Denis Alarcon Ramirez
- Edited by: Steven Mirkovich
- Music by: Yuri Poteyenko
- Production companies: Aldamisa Entertainment; A.R. Films; Non-Stop Production; Midnight Sun Pictures; K. Jam Media
- Distributed by: Anchor Bay Entertainment (United Kingdom); 20th Century Fox (Russia)
- Release date: 23 August 2013
- Running time: 96 minutes
- Countries: United Kingdom; Russia
- Languages: English; Russian
- Box office: $5.3 million

Devil's Pass (originally titled The Dyatlov Pass Incident) is a 2013 horror film directed by Renny Harlin, written by Vikram Weet, and starring Holly Goss, Matt Stokoe, Luke Albright, Ryan Hawley and Gemma Atkinson as Americans who investigate the Dyatlov Pass incident. It is shot in the style of found footage.

== Plot ==
Russian-language news, Russia-24, discusses five Oregon college students' disappearance. The Russian government recovers video footage but refuses to release it to the public; however, hackers obtain and release the footage. The students were in Russia to find out what happened to the nine hikers who mysteriously died in the Dyatlov Pass incident. Holly King and Jensen Day are co-directors, J.P. Hauser, Jr. and Andy Thatcher are expert climbers, and Denise Evers is the sound engineer.

The students first try to contact Piotr Karov, a member of the initial 1959 expedition who turned back after becoming ill on the first day. However, Karov has been hospitalized following a nervous breakdown. The administrators at the hospital claim that he is dead and attempt to turn away the filmmakers. In an upstairs window, the students see a man they assume to be Karov; he holds up a sign in Russian and is dragged away by orderlies. At a bar, the students recruit Sergei, who translates the sign as a warning to "stay away". Undeterred, Sergei introduces them to his aunt, Alya, who was part of the first rescue team. She tells them that a strange machine and eleven bodies were found at the site, not nine, as is commonly reported. The final two bodies had something wrong with them.

At their campsite, Holly hears howling. The next morning, the group notices barefoot prints in the snow that start and stop suddenly. Jensen claims the footprints are from yeti, but the others claim that Holly is messing with them. After hiking further, they again hear howling and find footprints that lead to a weather tower. Inside the weather tower, they find a human tongue. Denise wants to leave, but the others convince her to continue. Jensen reveals that as a teenager, he had heard the howling during a bad acid trip that ended with him being arrested while yelling incoherently about demons. Holly attempts to comfort Jensen by relating that she has had recurring dreams about Dyatlov Pass, which she interprets as fate. Unnoticed by the group, two mysterious creatures move through the snow in the distance.

The group arrives at Dyatlov Pass unsettlingly ahead of schedule. J. P. and Andy are further spooked when their navigational equipment exhibits strange malfunctions. Using a Geiger counter, Holly and Jensen are led to a bunker that locks from the outside. The door is already unlocked but frozen shut; they manage to open the door. They return to the camp without telling anyone about the bunker. The next morning, the group is awakened by explosions that cause an avalanche. Denise is killed, and Andy suffers a severe fracture. After they fire a flare, Russian soldiers posing as a rescue party arrive, kill Andy, and chase the three survivors to the bunker. J. P. is shot and wounded as they enter. Moving into a tunnel system, a mysterious creature moves through one tunnel while the three enter another. Holly and Jensen leave the wounded J. P. as they explore the bunker. Inside, they discover evidence of teleportation experiments, a dead soldier who is missing his tongue, a camcorder identical to theirs that has footage of their present conversation, dead bodies stacked in a pile and files relating to the Philadelphia Experiment.

Jensen and Holly hear J. P. screaming, and find him under attack by mutants who seem to be able to teleport. The mutants kill J. P. and chase Jensen and Holly into a sealed room with a strange-looking tunnel that leads further into a natural cave. Jensen theorizes this is a wormhole. Unwilling to starve to death or face the mutants, Jensen and Holly choose to step into the wormhole. Since there are no controls, Jensen suggests that they visualize a nearby destination. Holly suggests the bunker entrance and they enter the wormhole.

In 1959, Soviet military personnel discover two bodies near the bunker's entrance. Soldiers chase away a younger version of Sergei's aunt Alya, who had just stumbled across the bodies. The soldiers recover their video camera and drag the bodies inside the bunker, which is fully staffed and operational. The commanding officer orders the bodies to be stripped and hung on meat hooks. As the soldiers leave, the mutated bodies of Jensen and Holly, identified by Holly's neck tattoo, begin to revive.

== Cast ==
- Holly Goss as Holly King, co-director
  - Anastasiya Burdina as Mutant Holly King
- Matt Stokoe as Jensen Day, co-director and conspiracy theorist
- Luke Albright as John Patrick "J.P." Hauser, Jr., expert climber
- Ryan Hawley as Andy Thatcher, expert climber
- Gemma Atkinson as Denise Evers, audio engineer
- Richard Reid as Sgt. Smirnov, the Russian soldier
  - Anton Klimov as Sgt. Smirnov (voice)
- Nikolay Butenin as Sergei
- Nelly Nielsen as Alya, age 73
  - Valeriya Fedorovich as Alya, age 20
- Jane Perry as Professor Martha Kittles
- Boris Stepanov as Piotr Karov

== Production ==
Director Renny Harlin spent time in Moscow researching the government archives. His own theory of what happened at the Dyatlov Pass incident is that a government experiment went wrong. The casting for the film was intentionally kept to unknowns. Shooting took place in northern Russia.

== Release ==
Devil's Pass was released 23 August 2013. It was released on DVD in the UK 26 August 2013. It was released on DVD in the US 17 December 2013.

== Reception ==
Rotten Tomatoes, a review aggregator, reports that 48% of 23 surveyed critics gave it a positive review; the average rating is 4.91/10. Metacritic rated it 49/100. Miriam Bale of The New York Times called the film "an upgraded Blair Witch Project that is hilarious, though it is not clear whether this is intentional or not." Scott Foundas of Variety called it unoriginal yet watchable. SFX rated it 2/5 stars and called it "a scare-free thriller" with an underwhelming twist. Shelagh M. Rowan-Legg of Twitch Film called for a moratorium on found footage films and stated that the film should have been about the real-life incident. Mark Adams of Screen Daily called it "shrewdly constructed" and "smartly made". Philip French of The Guardian wrote that it "adds nothing to a real-life mystery from the Soviet era" and that the explanation is too outlandish. Bloody Disgusting rated the film 3/5 stars and recommended the film to enthusiasts of the real-life event but warned that the generic story would probably not excite people tired of found footage films. Gareth Jones of Dread Central rated it 3.5/5 stars and called it "a thoroughly intriguing mash-up of sci-fi, horror and real-life mystery." Matt Glasby of Total Film rated it 3/5 stars and called it a cheesy midnight movie that requires a forgiving audience. Owen Williams of Empire called it a "smartly-executed" film with a "satisfyingly circular conclusion". Nigel Floyd of Time Out London rated it 2/5 stars and wrote that the film becomes more unbelievable and silly as time goes on. Scott Weinberg of Fearnet called it a "simple but crafty little horror tale" with a payoff that can "come off as ridiculous or novel". Chris Holt of Starburst rated it 7/10 stars and wrote that it is "a fascinating and gripping film that despite being fundamentally flawed, is well worth your time."
