= Matt Stokoe =

British actor (born 1989)

- Born: Matthew Joseph Stokoe; 13 January 1989 (age 37); Durham, England
- Occupation: Actor
- Years active: 2009–present
- Partner: Sophie Rundle
- Children: 2

Matthew Joseph Stokoe (born 13 January 1989) is a British actor. He is best known for his roles as Alex in the Channel 4 series Misfits, crime boss Luke Aikens in the thriller Bodyguard, teacher Gerard Eyre in The Village, Captain Marcheaux in series 3 of The Musketeers for the BBC, and as James Read in the Sky 1 series Jamestown. In 2020, he played Gawain in the Netflix original series Cursed.

== Filmography ==
=== Film ===
Year	Title	Role	Notes
2011	Hollow	Scott	
2012	Comes a Bright Day	Police Officer	
2012	The Dyatlov Pass Incident	Jensen Day	
2018	Outlaw King	John Segrave, 2nd Baron Segrave	
2020	Rose	Sam	Also producer and writer

=== Television ===
Year	Title	Role	Notes
2011	The Borgias	French Soldier #2	1 episode
2011	Black Mirror	Guard	1 episode
2012	Last Tango in Halifax	Michael Dobson	1 episode
2012–2013	Misfits	Alex	Recurring role (season 4), main cast (season 5)
2013–2014	The Village	Gerard Eyre	Main cast
2014	Inspector George Gently	PC David Baird	1 episode
2015	Sense8	Jacks	1 episode
2016	The Musketeers	Captain Marcheaux	Recurring role (series 3)
2017–2019	Jamestown	James Read	Main cast
2018	Bodyguard	Luke Aikens	3 episodes
2020	Cursed	Gawain	Main cast
2023	The Hunt For Raoul Moat	Raoul Moat	Main cast
2024–2026	After the Flood	Detective Pat Holman	Main cast

=== Video games ===
Year	Title	Role	Notes
2013	Ryse: Son of Rome	Centurion	
2015	Final Fantasy XIV: Heavensward	Elidibus	Voice role
2016	Battlefield 1		Voice role
2017	Final Fantasy XIV: Stormblood	Rasho/Meffrid	Voice role
2020	Final Fantasy XIV: Shadowbringers	Elidibus	Voice role
2021	Final Fantasy XIV: Endwalker	Elidibus/Themis	Voice role

== Personal life ==
Stokoe is in a relationship with actress Sophie Rundle, who he met on the set of Jamestown. They have two sons born in April 2021 and June 2024.
