= This Is England (franchise) =

British franchise

- Directed by: Shane Meadows; Tom Harper (series)
- Written by: Shane Meadows; Jack Thorne (series)
- Produced by: Mark Herbert
- Starring: Thomas Turgoose; Stephen Graham; Jo Hartley; Andrew Shim; Vicky McClure; Joseph Gilgun; Rosamund Hanson; Chanel Cresswell
- Edited by: Chris Wyatt; Mark Eckersley
- Production company: Film4 Productions
- Release dates: 12 September 2006 (This Is England); 7 September 2010 (This Is England '86); 13 December 2011 (This Is England '88); 13 September 2015 (This Is England '90)
- Country: United Kingdom
- Language: English

This Is England is a British drama franchise consisting of a film and three subsequent television miniseries.

The four instalments in the franchise focus on the coming-of-age of a group of people and the evolution of different British youth subcultures, spanning the years between 1983 and 1990 in a town in the East Midlands of England.

The original film was written and directed by Shane Meadows.

The writer for the follow-up trilogy of series This Is England '86, This Is England '88, and This Is England '90 was Jack Thorne, in collaboration with Meadows. Tom Harper directed the first two episodes of This Is England '86, while Meadows directed the latter two episodes and every episode of the further two series.

== Instalments ==
- This Is England – Feature film released on 12 September 2006
- This Is England '86 – Four episodes broadcast between 7 and 28 September 2010
- This Is England '88 – Three episodes broadcast between 13 and 15 December 2011
- This Is England '90 – Four episodes broadcast between 13 September and 4 October 2015

== Recurring cast ==
Actor	Character	Film	Television		
Actor	Character	This Is England	This Is England '86	This Is England '88	This Is England '90
Thomas Turgoose	Shaun Fields	Main	Main	Main	Main
Joseph Gilgun	Woody	Main	Main	Main	Main
Vicky McClure	Lol	Main	Main	Main	Main
Andrew Shim	Milky	Main	Main	Main	Main
Rosamund Hanson	Smell	Main	Main	Main	Main
Andrew Ellis	Gadget	Main	Main	Main	Main
Chanel Cresswell	Kelly	Also Starring	Main	Main	Main
Danielle Watson	Trev	Also Starring	Main	Main	Main
Stephen Graham	Combo	Main	Also Starring	Also Starring	Also Starring
Michael Socha	Harvey	Also Starring	Main	Main	Main
Perry Benson	Meggy	Main	Main		Brief appearances
George Newton	Banjo	Main	Main	Also Starring	Brief appearances
Kriss Dosanjh	Mr Sandhu	Also Starring	Also Starring	Also Starring	Also Starring
Jo Hartley	Cynthia Fields	Also Starring	Also Starring	Also Starring	Also Starring
Jack O'Connell	Pukey	Main			
Kieran Hardcastle	Kes	Also Starring			Brief appearances
Sophie Ellerby	Pob	Also Starring			Brief appearances
Katherine Dow Blyton	Chrissy		Also Starring	Also Starring	Also Starring
Johnny Harris	Mick		Also Starring	Brief appearances	Brief appearances
Perry Fitzpatrick	Flip		Also Starring		Also Starring
Joseph Dempsie	Higgy		Also Starring		Also Starring

== See also ==
- List of film series with four entries
