= Andrew Shim =

British actor (born 1983)

- Born: 18 August 1983 (age 43); Miami, Florida, U.S.
- Occupations: Actor; MMA fighter
- Years active: 1999–present

Andrew Shim (born 18 August 1983) is an American-born British actor best known for his appearances in the films and TV shows of Shane Meadows, especially This Is England (2006–2015). Although a United States citizen, he has lived most of his life in Britain since 1989.

== Early life ==
Shim was born in Miami, Florida, United States on 18 August 1983, to an African-American mother and Chinese father. He is of African-American and Chinese descent. When Shim was 6 years old, his family moved from United States to England in 1989. He started at Nottingham's Central Junior Television Workshop when he was 14. His sister, Shauna Shim, was already attending and, although not initially keen, before Shim joined with his grandmother. Shim was on the verge of leaving when he auditioned for a local film project to be directed by Shane Meadows. Repeated callbacks resulted in him being cast as the title character in A Room for Romeo Brass.

== Career ==
Since starring as Romeo in A Room for Romeo Brass, Shim has appeared in subsequent Meadows' features Once Upon a Time in the Midlands (2002), Dead Man's Shoes (2004) and This Is England (2006) as well as the spin-off TV series This Is England '86 (2010), This Is England '88 (2011) and This Is England '90 (2015). He was also in the quarter-minute film "The Stairwell", which was Meadows' 2005 entry in the Nokia Shorts competition.

Additionally, Shim has appeared in several advertisements. He played a salesman in an Act On CO_{2} commercial, and also appeared in an Orange Mobile advert which was filmed in Cape Town, South Africa. He played the role of Jamie in British prison film Screwed (2011) and played the character of Sam in Airborne starring Mark Hamill.

== Personal life ==
Away from acting, Shim has a passion for sports cars and motorcycles. Having also worked for an IT software company, he regards himself as "a bit of an Arthur Daley", being quite successful at buying and selling used vehicles. He has stated that his dream car would be a black Lamborghini Murcielago Roadster. Shim is also an amateur mixed martial artist, competing in the featherweight division and training under Jim Wallhead and has also taken part in some motorcycle races.

On October 21, 2020, Shim was arrested in Málaga, Spain on drug trafficking charges. He was held on remand in Alhaurin de la Torre prison awaiting sentencing. In July 2021, Shim was given a suspended sentence and was released.

== Filmography ==
=== Films ===
Year	Film	Role	Notes
1999	A Room for Romeo Brass	Romeo Brass	Film debut First time partnered with Shane Meadows, Vicky McClure, Frank Harper, Ladene Hall and Paddy Considine
2002	Once Upon a Time in the Midlands	Donut	Second time partnered with Shane Meadows, second time opposite Ladene Hall since A Room For Romeo Brass
2004	Dead Man's Shoes	Elvis	Third time partnered with Shane Meadows, second time opposite Paddy Considine since A Room For Romeo Brass, first time partnered with Jo Hartley
2005	The Stairwell	Man	Short; Fourth time partnered with Shane Meadows, second time opposite Vicky McClure since A Room For Romeo Brass
2006	This is England	Milky	Fifth time partnered with Shane Meadows, third time opposite Vicky McClure, second time partnered with Frank Harper and Jo Hartley, first time opposite Thomas Turgoose, Joseph Gilgun, Stephen Graham, Rosamund Hanson, Chanel Cresswell and Michael Socha
2011	Screwed	Jamie	Third time partnered with Frank Harper
2012	Airborne	Sam	
2012	U.F.O.	Sam	
2015	Anti-Social	Jason	

=== Television ===
Year	Television	Role	Notes
1996	Out of Sight		TV series (1 episode: "Getting Rid of Ingrid")
2004	Fungus the Bogeyman	Grot	TV series
2010	This is England '86	Milky	TV series (4 episodes); Sixth time partnered with Shane Meadows, fourth time opposite Vicky McClure, third time partnered with Jo Hartley, second time opposite Thomas Turgoose, Joseph Gilgun, Stephen Graham, Rosamund Hanson, Chanel Cresswell and Michael Socha
2011	This is England '88	Milky	TV series (3 episodes); Seventh time partnered with Shane Meadows, fifth time opposite Vicky McClure, fourth time partnered with Jo Hartley, third time opposite Thomas Turgoose, Joseph Gilgun, Stephen Graham, Rosamund Hanson, Chanel Cresswell and Michael Socha
2015	This is England '90	Milky	TV series (4 episodes); Eighth time partnered with Shane Meadows, sixth time opposite Vicky McClure, fifth time partnered with Jo Hartley, fourth time opposite Thomas Turgoose, Joseph Gilgun, Stephen Graham, Rosamund Hanson, Chanel Cresswell and Michael Socha
