= This Is England =

2006 British drama film by Shane Meadows

- Theatrical release poster
- Directed by: Shane Meadows
- Written by: Shane Meadows
- Produced by: Mark Herbert
- Starring: Thomas Turgoose; Stephen Graham; Jo Hartley; Andrew Shim; Vicky McClure; Joe Gilgun; Rosamund Hanson; Jack O'Connell
- Cinematography: Danny Cohen
- Edited by: Chris Wyatt
- Music by: Ludovico Einaudi
- Production companies: Warp Films; FilmFour
- Distributed by: Optimum Releasing
- Release dates: 12 September 2006 (TIFF); 13 April 2007 (United Kingdom)
- Running time: 102 minutes
- Country: United Kingdom
- Language: English
- Budget: £1.5 million
- Box office: £5 million

This Is England is a 2006 British independent coming-of-age drama film written and directed by Shane Meadows, and starring Thomas Turgoose and Stephen Graham. The ensemble cast also includes Jo Hartley, Joe Gilgun, Vicky McClure, Andrew Shim, Rosamund Hanson, and Jack O'Connell. The plot centres on young skinheads in England in 1983, illustrating how their subculture became influenced by far-right politics. The film's title is a direct reference to a scene where the character Combo (played by Graham) explains his nationalist views using the phrase "this is England" during his speech.

This Is England received critical acclaim and went on to gross £5 million at the box office. Its success led to the creation of three sequel TV series: This Is England '86 (2010), This Is England '88 (2011), and This Is England '90 (2015).

== Plot ==
In July 1983, Shaun Fields is a troubled 12-year-old boy living with his widowed mother Cynthia in the East Midlands. Shaun is alienated and frequently antagonized at school and around town. On the last day of his school term, Shaun gets into a fight at school with a boy who insults him for wearing wide bell-bottoms and makes an offensive joke about his father, who was killed in the Falklands War.

Shaun later comes across a gang of young skinheads, led by Richard "Woody" Woodford, who feels sympathy for Shaun and invites him to join the group. He introduces Shaun to Milky, the gang's only black skinhead; Pukey; Kes; and the overweight, dim-witted Gadget. Despite some initial hostilities between Shaun and Gadget, the gang accepts Shaun as a member. Shaun bonds closely with Woody and his girlfriend Lorraine "Lol" Jenkins, who shave his head and gift him clothes to better fit into the skinhead gang. Shaun also develops a romantic relationship with Michelle, known as Smell, an older girl who dresses in a new wave, New Romantic style. Cynthia is initially hesitant to allow Shaun to be with the skinheads after they shave his head, but relents after meeting Woody.

One night, the gang attend a house party joined by Meggy, an older man affiliated with the skinheads. Suddenly, the group are ambushed by a large, bald and tattooed man wielding a machete, who is then tackled by Andrew "Combo" Gascoigne, a first-wave skinhead. Revealing the attack to be a prank, Combo introduces the man as his associate Banjo. Woody, ecstatic at Combo's return, announces he has just finished a three-year-long prison sentence. Combo, a charismatic, albeit unstable man with sociopathic tendencies, expresses English nationalist and racist views whilst telling stories, alienating Woody, Lol, Kes and offending Milky. Later on, he attempts to enforce his leadership over the other skinheads. During a speech, Combo inadvertently upsets Shaun by mentioning the Falklands War. Shaun reveals his father's death, which Combo then uses to manipulate the boy into joining his side. Consequently, the gang splits, with Shaun, the belligerent Pukey, Meggy and Gadget, who feels bullied by Woody for his weight, choosing Combo over Woody's apolitical gang.

Shaun finds a father figure in Combo, who in turn is impressed by, and identifies with, Shaun. Combo's group attend a National Front meeting. On the drive home, Pukey expresses doubt over their racist and nationalist politics. Enraged, Combo stops the car and throws Pukey out, assaulting him physically and verbally, before abandoning him in an isolated part of the countryside. As time goes by, the gang intimidate local Asian children and spray racist slogans on South Asian shopkeeper Mr. Sandhu's walls, while Shaun, previously banned from the shop, launches a bigoted verbal assault on Sandhu with demands for alcohol and cigarettes. Combo viciously threatens Sandhu with a machete and the gang steals goods for Smell's birthday party under Combo's instructions. After they arrive at the party, Woody's gang, once again including Pukey, immediately leave after a brief bout of tension.

Later on, Combo becomes upset after Lol, Woody's girlfriend, rejects him when he admits that he has loved her since they had sex years before. To console himself, Combo buys cannabis from Milky and invites him to a party. While intoxicated, Combo and Milky bond, but when Milky shares details of his many relatives, comfortable family life and happy upbringing, Combo becomes increasingly bitter and envious. Nearly overcome with emotion, Combo retreats into his ideology and begins to goad Milky with racist language. Milky rises above the abuse, but Combo goes berserk and brutally beats Milky into a coma. Banjo laughs as he holds Shaun down and Meggy watches on in horror. Combo angrily throws Shaun out of his flat and then assaults Banjo and Meggy, after the former expresses a desire to further harm the unconscious Milky, before evicting them as well. Horrified at the realization of what he has done, a remorseful Combo weeps over Milky until Shaun returns and the two take Milky to a hospital.

Some time later, Shaun is contemplating the incident whilst looking at a picture of his late father. Cynthia enters and assures him that Milky will be alright. Shaun is then shown walking along the beach, where he throws his St George's Flag, a gift from Combo, into the sea.

== Cast ==
- Thomas Turgoose as Shaun Fields
- Stephen Graham as Andrew "Combo" Gascoigne
- Jo Hartley as Cynthia Fields
- Joe Gilgun as Richard James "Woody" Woodford
- Vicky McClure as Frances Lorraine "Lol" Jenkins
- Andrew Shim as Michael "Milky"
- Rosamund Hanson as Michelle "Smell"
- Andrew Ellis as Gary "Gadget" Flowers
- Perry Benson as Ronald "Meggy" Megford
- George Newton as Banjo
- Jack O'Connell as "Pukey" Nicholls
- Kieran Hardcastle as Kes
- Chanel Cresswell as Kelly Jenkins
- Danielle Watson as Trev
- Sophie Ellerby as Pob
- Kriss Dosanjh as Mr. Sandhu
- Michael Socha as Harvey
- Frank Harper as Lenny
- Hannah Walters as Trudy

== Soundtrack ==
This Is England Soundtrack

Soundtrack album by various artists
- Released: 23 April 2007
- Genres: Ska, reggae, new wave
- Label: Commercial Marketing

Shane Meadows film soundtracks chronology
Dead Man's Shoes (2004)	This Is England Soundtrack (2007)	Somers Town (2008)

1. "54–46 Was My Number" – Toots & The Maytals
2. "Come On Eileen" – Dexys Midnight Runners
3. "Tainted Love" – Soft Cell
4. "Underpass/Flares" (Film dialogue)
5. "Nicole (Instrumental)" – Gravenhurst
6. "Cynth / Dad" (Film dialogue)
7. "Morning Sun" – Al Barry & The Cimarons
8. "Shoe Shop" (Film dialogue)
9. "Louie Louie" – Toots & The Maytals
10. "Pressure Drop" – Toots & The Maytals
11. "Hair in Cafe" (Film dialogue)
12. "Do the Dog" – The Specials
13. "Ritornare" – Ludovico Einaudi
14. "This Is England" (Film dialogue)
15. "Return of Django" – Lee "Scratch" Perry & The Upsetters
16. "Warhead" – UK Subs
17. "Fuori Dal Mondo" – Ludovico Einaudi
18. "Since Yesterday" – Strawberry Switchblade
19. "Tits" (Film dialogue)
20. "The Dark End of the Street" – Percy Sledge
21. "Oltremare" – Ludovico Einaudi
22. "Please Please Please Let Me Get What I Want" (The Smiths cover) – Clayhill
23. "Dietro Casa" – Ludovico Einaudi
24. "Never Seen the Sea" – Gavin Clark (of Clayhill)

Additional music from the film includes

1. "Pomp and Circumstance March No 1 in D. OP 39/1" (Edward Elgar) – performed by Royal Philharmonic Orchestra
2. "Maggie Gave a Thistle" – Wayne Shrapnel and The Oi Stars
3. "Let's Dance" – Jimmy Cliff

== Production ==
Much of the film was shot in residential areas of Nottingham, including St Ann's, Lenton, and The Meadows, with one section featuring abandoned houses at RAF Newton, a former airbase close to Bingham, Nottinghamshire. The opening fight was filmed at Wilsthorpe Business and Enterprise College, a secondary school in Long Eaton, Derbyshire, close to the Nottinghamshire/Derbyshire boundary. Additional scenes such as 'the docks' were filmed in Turgoose's home town of Grimsby. Turgoose was 13 at the time of filming. He had never acted before, was banned from his school play for bad behaviour, and demanded £5 to turn up for the film's auditions. The film was dedicated to Turgoose's mother, Sharon, who died of cancer on 29 December 2005; while she never saw the film, she saw a short preview. The cast attended her funeral.

=== Setting ===
The film is set in an unidentified town in the Midlands. Although much of the film was shot on location in Nottingham, a number of scenes portray the town's docks, which precludes this inland city being the setting for the action. Similarly, the dialects of the main characters are drawn from a wide geographical area.

== Release ==
In the United Kingdom, the film received a strict 18 certificate from the British Board of Film Classification (BBFC) for its depiction of realistic violence and racist language. In a piece for The Guardian, Meadows condemned the rating, writing that it "means that the film is now unavailable to the audience it will benefit the most", adding: "yes, the film is affecting but I think it's something that someone of 15 can cope with. It's not like it's a film about the 80s that has no value; it's incredibly relevant politically." The BBFC's rating was overturned in some regions; for instance, Bristol City Council described the BBFC's verdict as "idiotic" and instead gave it a 15 rating. This was a rare example of a local council overruling a film's classification, and inspired other English councils, including Grimsby (Turgoose's home town), to follow their example.

== Reception ==
On the review aggregator website Rotten Tomatoes, the film has an approval rating of 93% based on 96 reviews, with an average rating of 7.70/10. The website's critical consensus reads, "A moving coming-of-age tale that captures the despair among England's working-class youth in the 1980s". Metacritic gives the film a weighted average score of 86 out of 100 based on 23 reviews, indicating "universal acclaim". This made it the tenth best reviewed film of the year.

The film appeared on several US critics' top ten lists of 2007; it was third on the list by Newsweek's David Ansen, seventh on the list by The Oregonian's Marc Mohan, and ninth on the list by the Los Angeles Times' Kevin Crust.

In Britain, director Gillies Mackinnon rated the film the best of the year and David M. Thompson, critic and film-maker, rated it third. The film was ranked fourteenth in The Guardian's list of 2007's Best Films and fifteenth in Empire's Movies of the Year.

=== Accolades ===
The film won the Alexander Korda Award for Best British Film at the 2007 British Academy Film Awards.

At the 2006 British Independent Film Awards, the film won the award for Best Film and Thomas Turgoose won the award for Most Promising Newcomer.

== TV miniseries ==
In 2010, a spin-off series set three years after the film, This Is England '86, was shown on Channel 4. A sequel to the series set two and a half years later, This Is England '88, was broadcast in December 2011. A third and final series, This Is England '90, was shown in September 2015.
