= John Hardwick (director) =

British artist

- Born: John Hardwick; 1965 (age 60–61); Liverpool, England, UK
- Occupations: Director, writer, producer
- Years active: 1990–present

John Hardwick (born 1965) is a British television and film director. He grew up on Merseyside and studied American Studies at Swansea University and Louisiana State University.

In television, he has directed The Trial for Channel 4, Suspects for Channel 5, Delicious for Sky 1, Holby City for the BBC and Nearly Famous for E4. He was commissioned to shoot the third series of The Increasingly Poor Decisions of Todd Margaret for IFC in the USA.

Hardwick has made three feature films: 33x Around The Sun, a low budget art-house picture, described as "a one of a kind vision quest" by Time Out magazine, Svengali, a comedy set in the London music scene starring Jonny Owen and Vicky McClure, and Follow The Money, a documentary that follows a $10 bill for one month as it criss-crosses the United States.

Hardwick having been discovered by the band The Beekeepers then went on and directed music videos for Arctic Monkeys, Blur, Jake Bugg, Manic Street Preachers, Noel Gallagher's High Flying Birds and The Bluetones.

Hardwick occasionally works as a theatre director and in 2006 he directed the World Premiere of Max Frisch's Gantenbein at the Hebbel am Ufer Theater in Berlin. In 2008, he wrote and directed the afternoon play Death of a Pirate for BBC Radio 4.

== Television ==
- Delicious - Sky 1 (4 x 45 minute episodes)
- The Increasingly Poor Decisions of Todd Margaret - IFC (6 x 30 minute episodes)
- Suspects - Channel 5 (3 x 1 hour episodes)
- Holby City - BBC (4 x 1 hour episodes)
- Regulars - Channel 4 (pilot)
- Nearly Famous - E4 (2 x 1hr episodes)
- The Trial - Channel 4 (1 x 30 minute thriller)
- Hollyoaks Later - Channel 4 (1 x 1 hour episode)
- All About Tonight - BBC (pilot)

== Features ==
- 33X Around the Sun (2005)
- Svengali (2013)
- Follow The Money (2015)

== Shorts ==
- Wetwork (2000)
- To Have and to Hold (2000)
- Mule (2002)
- Table Dancing (2014)
- The Pitch (2015)

== Awards ==
- 2001 Best Director - Buenos Aires International Film Festival, Argentina - To Have And To Hold
- 2001 Best Short - Audience Award - Cambridge Film Festival, UK - To Have And To Hold
- 2002 Best Short Film - Melbourne International Film Festival, Australia - Mule
- 2002 Best Short Film - East End Film Festival, London - Mule
- 2007 Nominated for The Total Theatre Award - Edinburgh Festival - An Audience With Adrienne
- 2013 Nominated for The Michael Powell Award for best new British feature at EIFF - Svengali
