= This Is England '90 =

2015 British drama miniseries

- Genre: Drama
- Created by: Shane Meadows
- Based on: Characters by Shane Meadows
- Written by: Shane Meadows; Jack Thorne
- Directed by: Shane Meadows
- Starring: Vicky McClure; Joseph Gilgun; Thomas Turgoose; Stephen Graham; Andrew Shim; Chanel Cresswell
- Composer: Ludovico Einaudi
- Country of origin: United Kingdom
- Original language: English
- No. of series: 1
- No. of episodes: 4

Production
- Producers: Mark Herbert; Bekki Wray-Rogers
- Running time: 44-75 minutes
- Production companies: Warp Films; Big Arty Productions

Original release
- Network: Channel 4
- Release: 13 September – 4 October 2015

Related
- This Is England; This Is England '86; This Is England '88

This Is England '90 is a 2015 British television miniseries written by Shane Meadows and Jack Thorne and produced by Warp Films. It is the fourth and final installment of the This Is England saga, serving as a follow-up both to the film This Is England and to the series This Is England '86 and This Is England '88. It again stars Vicky McClure, Joseph Gilgun, Thomas Turgoose, and Stephen Graham.

This is England '90 was originally scheduled to release in 2012, but production was put on hold in order for Meadows to complete his documentary about reunited Manchester rock band The Stone Roses. Meadows returned to writing the script shortly thereafter, later stating that it was likely to be the final installment of the This is England series. In October 2014, Channel 4 confirmed that filming had commenced in Sheffield.

This is England '90 premiered on 13 September 2015 and was a critical and commercial success, winning several awards.

== Overview ==
This Is England '90 looks at rave culture and the 1990 FIFA World Cup. It features Shaun, Kelly, Trev, Harvey and Gadget who are involved in the rave scene. Combo is released from prison after serving his sentence for the manslaughter of Mick in This Is England '86. Flip and Higgy from the moped gang in This Is England '86 are more prominently featured in the cast in this series.

Similar to the film and the two previous series, '90 featured a montage of the era at the beginning of the first episode, featuring the resignation of Margaret Thatcher in November 1990 which is set to the 1988 song "There She Goes" by The La's (which was re-released in October 1990). The music of The Stone Roses was also featured prominently.

Each episode is set against a different season of the year, starting with Spring, and having significant time pass between each episode.

== Production ==
Much of the filming took place in Sheffield, particularly in the Gleadless area, with the Park Hill flats serving as the location for Harvey and Gadget's flat.

== Episodes ==
=== Spring ===
Milky, Woody, Lol and the gang are reunited in the era of 1990s rave culture, following on from the events of 1988, Woody and Lol are back together and have a baby, Jimmy. Lol has a job running the local school kitchen with Chrissy, Kelly and Trev working as dinnerladies, while Woody stays at home with his child.

Gadget, Harvey, Kelly, Trev and Shaun are all following the Madchester rave scene. They smoke cannabis and take whatever drugs they have, usually provided by Harvey, who appears to have become a low-level dealer on the estate.

After a conversation with Cynthia about the events of '88, Shaun goes to find Smell who dumped him in '88 for cheating on her with Fay after the Christmas production at college. Shaun waits outside Smell's college until classes end and awkwardly invites her to a Manchester-themed discothèque at the town hall. Smell, still disgruntled at Shaun, says she'll consider his invite, but also reveals she has started seeing someone else. The two depart, with Shaun holding back tears at the revelation.

Meanwhile, Woody and Lol visit Woody's parents' house, where they find Jennifer, Woody's ex-girlfriend, staying over after having an argument with her parents. As Woody sits down to talk with his parents, Mr. Squires, Woody's old manager, suddenly bursts out of a cupboard and announces he is starting up a new business and offers Woody a junior partnership. Woody becomes angry at his parents for planning the scheme with Mr. Squires and insists he does not need help, nor does he want to become like his father, resulting in an argument.

Later on, Shaun visits Harvey and Gadget's flat and smokes copious amounts of cannabis after his interaction with Smell earlier. Shaun tells his friends what happened and admits he is upset. Harvey makes jokes and impersonates Smell, cheering him up.

Afterwards, Woody and Lol visit Chrissy's house alongside Trev and Kelly. They discuss the upcoming disco and Lol is convinced to go with Kelly and Trev. Shaun, Harvey and Gadget are also on their way to the disco, when Shaun begins feeling dizzy and nauseous due to the many bong hits he took. Harvey gives Shaun some speed to perk him up for the night.

Everyone meets in the disco where "Fools Gold" is playing, and begin dancing, all whilst drinking and smoking. Whilst most of the gang enjoys the disco, Woody is at home when he receives a call from his parents, who apologise for causing an argument the other day. After the disco, a Goth-like boy called Harrison approaches Shaun, tells him he is Smell's boyfriend and apologises on Smell's behalf for her absence. Shaun, feeling disrespected, starts a fight with Harrison and his friends.

After things have calmed down everyone goes home, except Shaun, who sits alone in despair.

=== Summer ===
One morning, Harvey and Gadget are planning an overnight trip to a rave in the countryside. Harvey scolds Gadget for packing far too many items and tells him to reduce the amount of baggage. Elsewhere, Kelly leaves an older man's flat after having slept with him the night before.

Meanwhile, Shaun receives a letter from a college he had applied to study photography at. The letter informs him of his rejection. Cynthia tries to console Shaun, causing him to blow up and begin screaming at her. He later joins Harvey, Gadget, Kelly and Trev and the group set off to find the rave.

During the trip, they become lost and moods only worsen when Harvey and Gadget get into a fight over a map. They then encounter Flip and Higgy, whose car has broken down. The two squeeze into Harvey's car and join them. After failing to find the rave once again, they decide to simply camp in the woods for the night, until they follow the sound of nearby drums and stumble upon a commune of new-age travellers and spontaneously join their party. Shaun talks with a kindly older woman and ends up opening up about his late father, whilst Kelly, already drunk on alcohol and high on Ecstasy, is encouraged by three older men to smoke drugs before they have sex with her in a trailer. After waking, whilst watching the sunrise, a tearful Kelly confides in Gadget "I'm a fucking slag Gadget...I just do what I fucking want, Gadge, that's the fucking problem".

Lol, Woody and Milky stay at home, spending the afternoon having a barbecue in their front garden. When the phone rings in the evening, Lol says it is her mother and takes the call in another room. She later reveals it was not her mother, but actually Combo, who is being released from prison and needs a place to stay. Lol and Woody both agree Combo should stay with them.

=== Autumn ===
Lol and Woody invite everyone round to their house for Sunday dinner. They will also have some news to share, which Kelly believes will be Woody's proposal to Lol.

After the meal, they inform everyone that it was not Combo who killed Mick, but Lol. Lol also tells her sister Kelly that Mick raped Trev the night before he was killed. Kelly refuses to believe that her father was a bad person and begins angrily shouting at Lol, Woody and Trev. Chrissy breaks down and apologises for her own cowardice in not standing up to Mick. Afterwards, Kelly storms out of the room. Lol and Woody continue with the news that Combo is about to be released from prison and will be staying with them since he has no-where else to go. Milky becomes enraged at the news. Woody encourages Milky to forgive Combo, as he took the blame for Lol, but Milky refuses to have Combo living under the same roof as his child.

Kelly leaves home after the news and stays with Gadget and Harvey at their flat. Harvey is displeased with Kelly being there, but reluctantly agrees to let her stay after Gadget reveals the truth behind it. Unbeknownst to Gadget or Harvey, Kelly begins smoking heroin in the bathroom. Later, Combo is released from prison. Lol returns home with Combo, who tearfully reunites with Woody. Woody then proposes to Lol in their living room. At the same time, Milky secretly plans an attack on Combo.

Meanwhile, Shaun receives another letter from the college, who now offer him a place on the photography course, much to Cynthia and Sandhu's excitement.

=== Winter ===
While Lol and Woody plan their wedding, Milky plans revenge against Combo who is now about to start his first day working at a local community centre. Harvey catches Kelly smoking heroin in his bathroom and instructs her to leave immediately. When Gadget finds out, he has a blazing row with Harvey before leaving to find Kelly.

Shaun has started his photography course at college, making use of his new camera bought by his mother and Mr. Sandhu. He and fellow photography student Juliette begin an assignment together. While out taking photographs, the pair meet a distressed Gadget as he looks for Kelly, with Shaun joining Gadget in the search. They eventually find her in an isolated spot where her father's ashes were scattered. Both offer to find her a place to stay, but she refuses their help, mocks Gadget's pity, and leaves with a friend who Shaun and Gadget do not know. Kelly is later seen living with him and others in a run-down drug den.

Combo enjoys his first day at work at a community centre. After going out for lunch, he is surprised to find Milky waiting outside. Despite some tension, Milky invites Combo to join him for a cup of tea, which Combo accepts. On the way to a café, Combo becomes suspicious at the lengthy drive. As the two sit in the café alone, Combo apologises to Milky for the attack seven years prior and admits it was not done out of racism, but rather envy of Milky's large family and happy upbringing.

While Milky believes Combo is genuinely remorseful for his actions, his relative, Rudy, arrives with other family members, with Milky revealing that his family had sworn revenge for the beating Combo subjected him to. He apologises, but cannot change the outcome, as promises have already been made. Accepting his fate, Combo forgives Milky and says he hopes Milky will one day forgive him, before being ushered into the back of a van and driven to some disused dockside buildings. Combo is handed over to two white men, struggling and screaming for help as he is dragged away. The men drag him into a room and lock him inside with them. Combo was never seen again after this.

Two months later, Woody and Lol finally get married at the local church. At the reception, Shaun apologises to Harrison for his actions during the Spring, which he accepts. Smell, however, tries to create a scene over Juliette, who is now Shaun's girlfriend. Harvey and Gadget have also reconciled after their argument. When alone in the snooker room, Lol asks Milky if he has seen or heard from Combo. He acts uneasy and evades the questions, with Lol remarking that Milky has not been himself and suspects that Milky was involved in Combo's disappearance.

Kelly leaves the den and walks to her sister's wedding reception. She attempts to leave a card and disappear before she is seen by anyone, but is spotted by Lol. The two sisters reconcile during a deep conversation and eventually Kelly agrees to stay and join in the wedding celebrations, becoming re-united with her family and friends. The episode ends with a wedding-dance party scene containing most of the major characters from the film and television series, including Meggy, Banjo, Kes and Pob. The happy montage is intercut with a lone Milky standing at the bar, evidently remorseful over his part in Combo's disappearance.

== Cast ==
- Thomas Turgoose as Shaun Fields
- Vicky McClure as Frances Lorraine "Lol" Jenkins
- Joe Gilgun as Richard "Woody" Woodford
- Stephen Graham as Andrew "Combo" Gascoigne
- Andrew Shim as Michael "Milky"
- Chanel Cresswell as Kelly Jenkins
- Danielle Watson as Trev
- Lyra Mae Thomas as Lisa
- Andrew Ellis as Gary "Gadget" Flowers
- Michael Socha as Harvey
- Rosamund Hanson as Michelle "Smell"
- Haris Salihovic as Harrison
- Jo Hartley as Cynthia Fields
- Kriss Dosanjh as Mr. Sandhu
- Katherine Dow Blyton as Christine "Chrissy" Jenkins
- Steve Brody as Richard Woodford, Sr.
- Rebecca Manley as Barbara Woodford
- Stacey Sampson as Jennifer
- Perry Fitzpatrick as Flip
- Joe Dempsie as Higgy
- Helen Behan as Helen
- Poppy Corby-Tuech as Juliette
- William Travis as Mr. Squires
- Johnny Harris as Michael "Mick" Jenkins
- Perry Benson as Ronald "Meggy" Megford
- George Newton as Banjo
- Jermaine Liburd (formerly Vauxhall Jermaine) as Rudy
- Hannah Walters as Trudy
- Kieran Hardcastle as Kes
- Sophie Ellerby as Pob
- Lauren O'Rourke as Sonia

== Awards ==
The show won three British Academy Television Awards in 2016, for Mini-Series, Supporting Actress for Chanel Cresswell, and Director for Shane Meadows.

== Future ==
Although This Is England '90 was previously expected to be the final instalment in the This Is England series, in interviews close to the May 2016 BAFTA awards, Meadows talked about the potential of one final film as a way of "bookending [the series] for cinema and TV", saying "I think there's a film that's left in there ... there is still one little gem in there". He implied this would be a future release to end the series, shown simultaneously in cinemas and on television.

Planning for another film was again confirmed in 2017, although no timescale has been discussed for the project. In May 2019, while promoting The Virtues with Stephen Graham, Meadows once again talked of a final film "set at the millennium", which would be entitled This Is England '00 if it were to come to fruition. Although Meadows has not yet written a script for the film, he described the storyline as "an absolute banger". The idea of a sequel has been re-iterated by Shane Meadows as recently as April 2020, who expressed his hope for This Is England '00 to be filmed depicting the following ten years after This Is England '90 for continuity reasons.
