= Svengali (2013 film) =

- Directed by: John Hardwick
- Written by: Jonny Owen
- Produced by: Martin Root; Jonny Owen; Victoria Wood; Rob Small
- Starring: Martin Freeman; Vicky McClure; Matt Berry; Michael Socha; Michael Smiley; Natasha O'Keeffe; Jonny Owen; Vauxhall Jermaine
- Cinematography: Catherine Derry
- Edited by: Anthony 'Pants' Boys; Kant Pan
- Music by: Tristin Norwell
- Production companies: Root Films; Munro Film Services
- Distributed by: Universal Pictures
- Release dates: 21 June 2013 (Edinburgh International Film Festival); 21 March 2014 (United Kingdom)
- Running time: 99 minutes
- Country: United Kingdom
- Language: English

Svengali is a 2013 British film directed by John Hardwick, written by Jonny Owen, and starring Martin Freeman, Vicky McClure, Matt Berry, Michael Socha, Michael Smiley, Vauxhall Jermaine and Natasha O'Keeffe. The film was produced by Root Films.

== Synopsis ==
Dixie (Jonny Owen) is a postman from South Wales, a mod, and a music fanatic. All his life he's dreamed of discovering a great band and then one day, trawling through YouTube, he finds them... 'The Premature Congratulations' (aka The Prims). He hunts them down and offers them his management services. They are young, arrogant, sexy and utterly magnificent. Putting their demo on a cassette tape, Dixie heads out onto the streets of London... Innocent, wide-eyed Dixie embarks on a roller coaster ride through the most infamous industry of them all. His partner and his sanity through it all is his soulmate Michelle (Vicky McClure).

Dixe hunts down an old friend Horsey (Roger Evans), who is in the music business, however Horsey wants nothing do with his old friend. While pestering Horsey in a pub, he meets Alan McGee, famous band manager. Dixie borrows money to set up the band for their first gig, and running low on cash, takes money that was meant for him and Shell's wedding. The gig goes very well, with a huge turnout and lots of industry people turn up, even with the BBC offering a gig. However, Dixie is burning through cash. Dixie gets a job at Don's records. Don (Martin Freeman) is also a mod, and his wife insists on giving him a job.

Dixie continues trying to get gigs for the band, who are constantly borrowing money from him. He tries to work at Don's, but ends up getting sacked because he makes mistakes. Horsey's boss at the management agency Jeremy Braines (Matt Berry), hears how big the Prims are getting and tells Horsey he must sign them. The Prims get kicked out of their flat, and start living at Dixies and Shell's flat, and in the meantime, Dixie goes back to his family in Wales for a quick visit, only to find out his dad is dying. Upon return to London, he goes back to his flat; Shell is at the end of her tether with all the money problems, the final straw being when she finds the money for their wedding has been spent.

Locked out of the flat, by the Russian landlady Vanya because they haven't paid the rent, he breaks in to grab his prized possession, his soul records, and then finds himself homeless in London. Horsey offers him a place to stay for the night and buys his prized records for 5000 pounds. Dixie uses that to pay off his loans. Finally, with the band starting to be successful, but his own life in a romantic and financial mess, he realises he needs to make a choice between the band, and his love for Michelle.

== Cast ==
- Jonny Owen as Dixie
- Vicky McClure as Shell
- Roger Evans as Horsey
- Martin Freeman as Don
- Maxine Peake as Angie
- Matt Berry as Jeremy Braines
- Michael Socha as Tommy
- Michael Smiley as Irish Pierre
- Natasha O'Keeffe as Natasha
- Morwenna Banks as Francine
- Ciarán Griffiths as Burnsy
- Joel Fry as Macca
- Dylan Edwards as Jake
- Curtis Lee Thompson as Scott
- Jessica Ellerby as Alice
- Vauxhall Jermaine as Marcus
- Katy Brand as Katya
- Di Botcher as Mrs. Cooper
- Brian Hibbard as Dixie's Dad
- Huw Stephens as Himself
- Alan McGee as Himself
- Max Rushden as Himself
- Carl Barat as Himself
- Pearl Mackie as F.O.H Girl

== Edinburgh Film Festival ==
Svengali was selected to show at the 67th Edinburgh International Film Festival. It has also been nominated for the Michael Powell Award; a prize which honours the best British feature film.

== Reception ==
Svengali received mostly unfavourable reviews. On Rotten Tomatoes, the film has an approval rating of 38% based on 13 reviews with an average rating of 4.4/10.
