= Vicky McClure =

English actress (born 1983)

Vicky McClure MBE
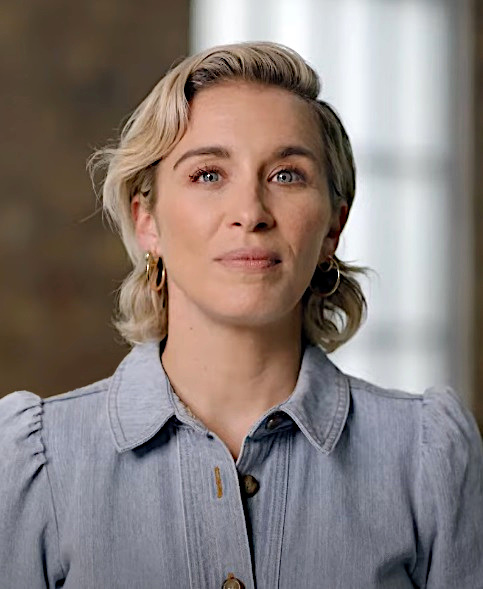
- McClure in 2024
- Born: Vicky Lee McClure; 8 May 1983 (age 43); Nottingham, England
- Occupations: Actress; presenter
- Years active: 1999–present
- Spouse: Jonny Owen (m. 2023)

Vicky Lee McClure MBE (born 8 May 1983) is an English actress and presenter. She is known for her roles as EXPO (Explosives Officer) Lana Washington in the ITV series Trigger Point (2022–present), Detective Inspector Kate Fleming in the BBC series Line of Duty (2012–present) and Lol Jenkins in Shane Meadows's film This Is England (2006) and its Channel 4 sequel mini-series This Is England '86 (2010), This Is England '88 (2011), and This Is England '90 (2015). Before This is England, she appeared in another of Meadows' films, A Room for Romeo Brass (1999), in which she played Ladine. She won the RTS Award and British Academy Television Award for Best Actress for her portrayal of Lol in This is England '86 in 2011.

McClure is also well known for her role as Karen White in ITV's Broadchurch, and other roles such as in Filth and Wisdom (2008), Hummingbird (2013), Svengali (2013), and The Replacement (2017).

== Early life ==
Vicky Lee McClure was born on 8 May 1983 in the Wollaton area of Nottingham. Her father was a joiner and her mother was a hairdresser. She has an elder sister, Jenny. McClure was educated at Fernwood School. From the age of three she took dance lessons, and she auditioned for the Central Junior Television Workshop when she was 11. Unsuccessful on her first attempt, she was recalled a week later after another child dropped out. While there, she was coached and mentored by fellow Nottingham-born actress Samantha Morton. McClure successfully auditioned for entry to the Italia Conti Academy of Theatre Arts aged 16, but her family could not afford the tuition fees, and she remained at the Workshop.

== Career ==
At 15, she was asked to audition for a part in Shane Meadows's independent film A Room for Romeo Brass. The youngest to audition, she was called back, and gained the role of Ladine Brass. She secured an agent, but achieved no parts for four years. After starting a drama foundation course at the local college on leaving school, she left to work in retail, initially for H. Samuel and then Dorothy Perkins. Aged 19 she gave up her acting ambitions for 12 months, but then took a part-time office job in Nottingham to allow her to audition for parts, mostly in London.

After an 18-month period of taking walk-on parts in soaps and daytime TV, McClure then worked on the This is England film and mini-series from 2006 until 2015, portraying the role of Lorraine "Lol" Jenkins. In an April 2007 interview with Time Out, McClure spoke of Meadows approaching her for the role while she was in a pub with Andrew Shim. She described the making of the film, which was highly improvised, as "constant laughing and jokes". In 2011, her performance as Lorraine "Lol" Jenkins in This is England '86 won her the British Academy Television Award for Best Actress and the Royal Television Society Award for Best Actress.

McClure co-starred in the 2008 London-based comedy film Filth and Wisdom, the first feature film directed by Madonna. She admitted to being slightly star-struck upon first meeting Madonna, "I tried to act as cool as possible but inside I'm like, "Oh my God; there's Madonna!" You can't help it". The film premièred at the Berlin International Film Festival on 13 February 2008.

McClure was also featured alongside Kaya Scodelario, Abbey Butler, Andy Crane and Paul Young in Plan B's music video "She Said". In 2010, McClure appeared in a number of promotional short films for the English cosmetics brand Illamasqua. In 2012, McClure appeared in the video for Jake Bugg's song "Two Fingers" along with Line of Duty co-star Craig Parkinson. On 18 March 2014, McClure appeared on BBC Radio 1's Innuendo Bingo.

McClure was approached and auditioned for a role in ITV soap Emmerdale, but decided to turn it down. In 2012, she joined the cast of the British police procedural television series Line of Duty as DC Kate Fleming, continuing in the role in all six series. She appeared in the 2013 British action-thriller film Hummingbird opposite Jason Statham.

In July 2016, McClure appeared as Winnie Verloc in The Secret Agent, based on the novel of the same name by Joseph Conrad.

McClure starred in the BBC TV thriller The Replacement in 2017. In February 2017, McClure made her professional stage début at Nottingham Playhouse in the fortieth anniversary production of Touched by Stephen Lowe. McClure did voiceover work for the More4 show A Year on the Farm in August the same year.

In 2019, McClure starred as Nicola in the channel 4 drama I Am... with This is England and Line of Duty co-star and friend Perry Fitzpatrick. She received praise for her portrayal of a woman trapped in an emotionally abusive relationship. Also in 2019, McClure was cast in the TV adaptation of Alex Rider, a series of young adult books by Anthony Horowitz. As of 2020, she plays Mrs. Jones, the deputy head of Mi6 in the show. In December 2019, McClure made a brief appearance as herself in the popular internet comedy series on YouTube Charity Shop Sue, based in Bulwell, Nottinghamshire.

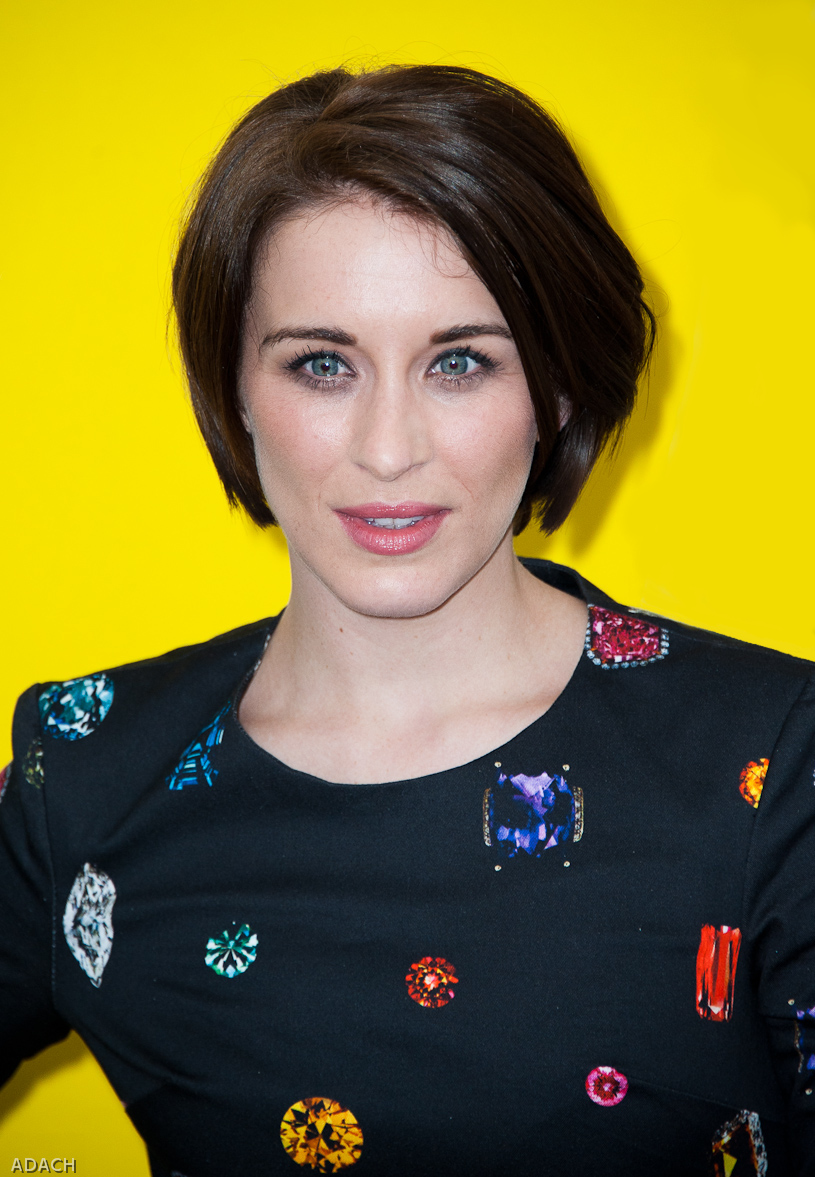
Vicky McClure at Svengali film premiere in 2014

Since 2022, McClure has starred in Trigger Point, an ITV series, as a bomb disposal expert in London.

On 17 July 2025, McClure was featured as a singer on the Reverend and the Makers' single "Haircut". An official music video, directed by Nick Suchak, was released a day later. The single peaked at number 17 on the UK Singles Downloads Chart.

== Our Dementia Choir ==
McClure formed the Our Dementia Choir in 2019, after her late grandmother's diagnosis of Alzheimer's taught her the "healing power" of music. McClure worked on a documentary to raise awareness of the disease, which culminated in a performance in front of 2,000 people at Nottingham's Royal Concert Hall. She revisited them in 2020, exploring how the pandemic had affected them. She is also an Alzheimer's Society Ambassador as of 2018, and has taken part in the Alzheimer's Society Memory Walks for many years.

In 2022, McClure made a further BBC documentary featuring other dementia gatherings and musical support groups from elsewhere in the UK, and brought her own Dementia Choir to perform with Tom Grennan before 20,000 spectators at the Splendour Festival held in Nottingham's Wollaton Hall grounds.

In October 2024, Evangelos Marinakis allocated to the choir a rehearsal and socialising space in the Robin Hood Suite at City Ground, Nottingham Forest football club's stadium.

== Dance events ==
In 2024, McClure and husband Jonny organised daytime dance hall gatherings targeted at over-30s. Named Day Fever, the inaugural event was at Sheffield's City Hall, with DJs including Jon McClure and Jonny's daughter, Katie Owen. Other venues are scheduled including in McClure's hometown of Nottingham and Jonny's in Cardiff. The sudden popularity prompted another similar event independently promoted in Lincoln.

== Personal life ==
McClure lives in Nottingham with Welsh director Jonny Owen. On 28 December 2017, they announced their engagement. They married on 11 August 2023.

In 2013, she opened the Hogarth Teenage Cancer Trust unit at Nottingham City Hospital, and has remained an avid supporter of the Teenage Cancer Trust since.

McClure is close friends with Line of Duty stars Martin Compston and Adrian Dunbar, and writer Jed Mercurio. She has also remained close with her This is England co-stars, with many attending Thomas Turgoose's wedding in 2019. She is also friends with Perry Fitzpatrick, having worked with him on many projects over the past twenty years.

McClure was appointed Member of the Order of the British Empire (MBE) in the 2023 Birthday Honours for services to drama and to charity. She received the award from King Charles on 12 December 2023 at the Windsor Castle investiture ceremony.

=== Local recognition ===
In 2015, Nottingham Express Transit (NET) named tram 224 after her. On her maiden trip she was asked to leave the tram for fare evasion – having been offered a free ride, she did not have a ticket. As of March 2022, NET had named 37 trams after people with connections local to the Nottingham area. In February 2026, the tram's name was altered to Vicky McClure's Our Dementia Choir.

In August 2022, McClure was awarded an honorary Doctorate of Letters by the University of Nottingham for her work with Our Dementia Choir, including a TV documentary. She was previously awarded an honorary Doctorate of Arts by Nottingham Trent University during 2015, in recognition of her contributions to the acting profession and charitable work in Nottingham.

== Discography ==
List of singles released as lead artist, with selected chart positions, showing year released and originating album
Title	Year	Peak chart positions	Album
Title	Year	UK Digital	Album
"Haircut" (with Reverend and the Makers)	2025	17	Non-album single

== Filmography ==
=== Film ===
Year	Film	Role	Notes
1999	A Room for Romeo Brass	Ladine Brass	
2004	Birth Day	Lucia	Short films
2005	The Stairwell	Woman	Short films
2006	This Is England	Frances Lorraine "Lol" Jenkins	
2008	Filth and Wisdom	Juliette	
2009	Enough Rope	Iris	Video
2010	Just Before Dawn	Fay	Short film
2012	Anna Karenina	Girl Harvesting	Uncredited role
2013	Hummingbird / Redemption	Dawn	
2013	Svengali	Shell	
2015	Convenience	Levi	
2015	Beverley	Caroline	Short films
2015	A Plea for Grimsby	Olivia	Short films
2015	Operator	Gemma	Short films
2016	Macbeth: Shakespeare Lives	Lady Macbeth	Short films
2018	The Nest	Janine	Short films
2023	Good Grief	The Voice	Short films
TBA	The Last Disturbance of Madeline Hynde	TBA	Post-production

=== Television ===
Year	Film	Role	Notes
2000	Doctors	Kirsty Dunns	Series 2; episode 40: "Love Me Tender"
2002	Tough Love	Zoe Love	Television film
2009	Cast Offs	Claire	Episode 6: "Carrie"
2010	Five Daughters	Stacy Nicholls	Mini-series; episodes 1–3
2010	This Is England '86	Frances Lorraine "Lol" Jenkins	Mini-series; episodes 1–4; BAFTA TV Award for Best Actress; RTS Award for Best Actress; TV Choice Award for Best Actress
2011	Walk Like a Panther	Natalie	Episode 1
2011	Stolen	DC Manda Healey	Television film
2011	Coming Up	Kelly	Series 9; episode 1: "Rough Skin"
2011	The Body Farm	Tess Williams	Mini-series; episode 4: "Sexual Intentions"
2011	This Is England '88	Frances Lorraine "Lol" Jenkins	Mini-series; episodes 1–3
2012	True Love	Serena	Mini-series; episode 1: "Nick"
2012–2021	Line of Duty	DC/DS/DI Kate Fleming	Series 1–6; 36 episodes
2013	Broadchurch	Karen White	Series 1; episodes 1–6 & 8
2015	This Is England '90	Frances Lorraine "Lol" Jenkins	Mini-series; episodes 1–4
2016	The Secret Agent	Winnie Verloc	Mini-series; episodes 1–3
2017	The Replacement	Paula Reece	Mini-series; episodes 1–3
2017	Sky Comedy Christmas Shorts	Herself	Series 2; episode 3: "Charity Shop Sue's Christmas". Also producer
2018	Action Team	Ruth Brooks	Episodes 1–6
2018	Mother's Day	Susan McHugh	Television film
2019	I Am...	Nicola	Series 1; episode 1: "I Am... Nicola". Also writer
2019	Charity Shop Sue	Angry Customer	Episode 6: "Rot Test Challenge". Also producer; 18 episodes
2019, 2020	Our Dementia Choir with Vicky McClure	Herself - Presenter	Episodes 1 & 2, & 2020 Christmas Special
2020–2024	Alex Rider	Mrs. Jones	Main role. Series 1–3; 24 episodes
2022	Without Sin	Stella Tomlinson	Mini-series; episodes 1–4. Also executive producer
2022–present	Trigger Point	Lana Washington	Lead role. Series 1–4; 24 episodes. Also executive producer series 2–4; 18 episodes
2023	Vicky McClure: My Grandad's War	Herself - Presenter	Television Special
2024	Insomnia	Emma Averill	Episodes 1–6. Also producer
2026	Britain's Murder Map	Herself	With Jonny Owen

== Awards and nominations ==
Year	Result	Award	Category	Film or series	Character
2011	Nominated	TV Quick Award	Best Actress	This is England '86	Lol
2011	Won	RTS Television Awards	Best Actor (Female)	This is England '86	Lol
2011	Won	BAFTA Television Awards	Best Actress	This is England '86	Lol
2012	Nominated	RTS Television Awards	Best Actor (Female)	This is England '86	Lol
2012	Nominated	BAFTA Television Awards	Best Actress	This is England '88	Lol
2012	Nominated	Glamour Awards	Pandora Breakthrough		
2015	Nominated	BAFTA Television Awards	Best Supporting Actress	Line of Duty	Kate Fleming
2019	Nominated	TV Choice Awards	Best Actress	Line of Duty	Kate Fleming
2021	Won	TV Choice Awards	Best Actress	Line of Duty	Kate Fleming
2021	Nominated	National Television Awards	Drama Performance	Line of Duty	Kate Fleming
2021	Won	TV Times Awards	Favourite Actress	Line of Duty	Kate Fleming
2022	Nominated	National Television Awards	Drama Performance	Trigger Point	Lana Washington
2026	Won	National Television Awards	Drama Performance	Trigger Point	Lana Washington
