= The Gallows Pole (TV series) =

British Television series

- Genre: Period drama; Crime drama
- Based on: The Gallows Pole by Benjamin Myers
- Written by: Shane Meadows
- Directed by: Shane Meadows
- Starring: Michael Socha; Sophie McShera
- Countries of origin: United Kingdom; Ireland
- Original language: English
- No. of series: 1
- No. of episodes: 3

Production
- Executive producers: Shane Meadows; Ed Guiney; Andrew Lowe
- Production companies: Element Pictures; Big Arty Productions; A24

Original release
- Network: BBC Two
- Release: 31 May – 14 June 2023

The Gallows Pole is a three-part television series made for the BBC by Element Pictures, Big Arty Productions, and A24. It is a Shane Meadows adaptation of the novel of the same name by Benjamin Myers. According to Meadows, the series is a prequel to Myers's novel. It premiered on 31 May 2023.

== Synopsis ==
The series tells the fictionalised story of David Hartley and the Cragg Vale Coiners at the onset of the Industrial Revolution in 18th-century Yorkshire. Hartley (Socha) assembles a gang of weavers and land-workers to embark upon a revolutionary criminal enterprise that will capsize the economy and become the biggest fraud in British history.

== Cast ==
- Michael Socha as David Hartley
- Sophie McShera as Grace Sutcliffe (later Hartley)
- Thomas Turgoose as William Hartley
- Ralph Ineson as The Clothier
- Samuel Edward-Cook as Isaac Hartley
- Nicole Barber-Lane as Susie
- Anthony Welsh as Abe Oldfield
- Adam Fogerty as James Broadbent
- Fine Time Fontayne as Joseph Broadbent
- Rob Galloway as Sid the Snake
- Stevie Binns as Mand
- Soraya Jane Nabipour as Darya Hartley
- Charlotte Ockelton as Gwen Hartley
- Olivia Pentelow as Hannah Oldfield
- Dave Perkins as Tom Hartley
- Jennifer Reid as Barb
- Joe Sproulle as Joe the Pickpocket
- Jordan Preston as Stagman
- Yusra Warsama as Bethsheba
- Stuart Zubrzycki as Billy Vardy

== Production ==
The project was announced for Meadows in May 2021 as his first television series with executive producers Piers Wenger and Tom Lazenby for the BBC. The series is being produced for the BBC by Element Pictures with A24.

=== Casting ===
In September 2021, Socha, Tom Burke, Turgoose and George MacKay were announced to be cast. Meadows described going on an "open casting odyssey, watching over 6,500 self-tapes from unrepresented actors and actresses". Burke and MacKay did not ultimately appear in the series.

=== Filming ===
Principal photography was revealed to have started in September 2021. Filming locations included the village of Heptonstall, near Hebden Bridge in West Yorkshire.

=== Music ===
Music on the series comes from Swedish psychedelic band Goat.

Additional traditional music from the period was researched and performed by cast member Jennifer Reid and fiddler Tom Kitching.

The opening theme is "What Happens When You Turn the Devil Down" by The Mystery Lights.

== Broadcast ==
The opening episode was broadcast on BBC Two on 31 May 2023, with all episodes released on BBC iPlayer the same day. As of 2025, it is the last drama serial made for BBC2.

== Reception ==
=== Critical reception ===
On the review aggregator website Rotten Tomatoes, The Gallows Pole holds an approval rating of 82% based on 11 reviews.

=== Accolades ===
For their work on the series Paul Harrison & Owen Hulme won in the Picture Enhancement category and Ed Kevill-Davies and Lucas Roche were nominated in the Best Design - Titles category at the 2023 Royal Television Society Craft & Design Awards.
