= Summer (2008 film) =

- Promotional poster
- Directed by: Kenneth Glenaan
- Written by: Hugh Ellis
- Produced by: Camilla Bray
- Starring: Robert Carlyle; Rachael Blake; Steve Evets; Michael Socha
- Cinematography: Tony Slater-Ling
- Edited by: Kristina Heatherington
- Music by: Stephen McKeon
- Distributed by: Vertigo Films; Contender Entertainment Group
- Release dates: 24 October 2008 (Rome Film Festival); 5 December 2008
- Running time: 95 minutes
- Country: United Kingdom
- Language: English

Summer is a 2008 film directed by Kenneth Glenaan and starring Robert Carlyle and Rachael Blake. It tells the story of a lively and wayward man coming to terms with the realities of age and death. Shaun (Carlyle) has to confront past demons as his first love re-appears and his best friend, Daz, is terminally ill. The film is set mainly in the present and includes reflections on his childhood in flashbacks. On the review aggregator website Rotten Tomatoes, 78% of 9 critics' reviews are positive. The website's consensus reads: "Strong sensitive performances in this low-budget British drama illuminate this tough gritty picture."

== Awards ==
- BAFTA Scotland Award – Best Directing in Film or Television – Won
- BAFTA Scotland Award – Best Feature Film – Won
- BAFTA Scotland Award – Best Acting Performance in Film, Robert Carlyle – Nominee
