= This Is England '86 =

2010 British drama mini-series

- Genre: Drama
- Created by: Shane Meadows
- Based on: Characters by Shane Meadows
- Written by: Shane Meadows; Jack Thorne
- Directed by: Tom Harper (Epi 1–2); Shane Meadows (Epi 3–4)
- Starring: Vicky McClure; Joe Gilgun; Thomas Turgoose; Stephen Graham; Johnny Harris; Rosamund Hanson; Chanel Cresswell
- Composer: Ludovico Einaudi
- Country of origin: United Kingdom
- Original language: English
- No. of series: 1
- No. of episodes: 4

Production
- Executive producers: Mark Herbert, Shane Meadows
- Producer: Derrin Schlesinger
- Editor: Mark Eckersley (episodes 1–2) Chris Wyatt (episodes 3–4)
- Camera setup: Danny Cohen
- Running time: 45 minutes
- Production companies: Warp Films, Big Arty Productions

Original release
- Network: Channel 4
- Release: 7 September – 28 September 2010

Related
- This Is England; This Is England '88; This Is England '90

This Is England '86 is a 2010 four-part British drama written by Shane Meadows and Jack Thorne, a spin-off from the 2006 film This Is England. Set three years later, it focuses on the mod revival scene rather than the skinhead subculture, with the gang variously adopting an eclectic mix of clothing styles.

Like the film version previously, Thomas Turgoose stars as Shaun, with central roles played by Joe Gilgun as Woody, now a scooter-riding mod, although girlfriend Lol (Vicky McClure) and her friend Trev stay loyal to their roots and still wear the skinhead garb. Lol's sister Kelly has gone new wave/punk, while other gang members adopt psychobilly, early chav and mohican influences.

The story takes place during the 1986 FIFA World Cup. As Shaun completes his last school exam, he realises he will have to find his way in the world. His now-estranged friends including Woody, Lol, Smell, Gadget and Meggy, are still around the area, looking for love, entertainment and employment.

== Development ==
On 26 August 2009, Channel 4 promised that it would fund a four-part television drama, This Is England '86, to be written by Shane Meadows and Jack Thorne. Meadows said:

When I finished This Is England, I had a wealth of material and unused ideas that I felt very keen to take further – audiences seemed to really respond to the characters we created and out of my longstanding relationship with Film4 and Channel 4 the idea for a television serial developed. Not only did I want to take the story of the gang broader and deeper, I also saw in the experiences of the young in 1986 many resonances to now – recession, lack of jobs, sense of the world at a turning point. Whereas the film told part of the story, the TV series will tell the rest.

Meadows said that Combo (Stephen Graham) would return, that the fate of Milky would be revealed, and that a wedding between Woody and Lol would be called off. He said if the series succeeded, he would follow it with another series. He said Milky was alive and that Woody has a factory job and was about to marry Lol. He said that scooters, including Vespas and Lambrettas, would be used in the series - reflecting the scooterboy subculture of the mid to late 1980s.

Channel 4's terms for the series was that the original gang had to be slimmed down. This resulted in the removal of a few characters that were in the feature film: Kez (Kieran Hardcastle) and Pob (Sophie Ellerby) were cut, while Pukey (Jack O'Connell) had to be cut as the actor had other commitments. Pukey's dialogue and story was given to the returning character Harvey (Michael Socha), who had a bit-part in the film as a school-bully; the series does not explain how he joined the gang or got on friendly terms with Shaun. A new bully, Flip, takes Harvey's place as Shaun's tormentor and leads a moped gang (Harvey is the first person to hit Flip for threatening Shaun in episode 3).

=== Setting ===
Much of the series was filmed around the sprawling, down-at-heel Gleadless Valley area of Sheffield, with most of the drama centring on Ironside Road and the large, concrete-sided maisonettes are a prominent feature across either side of Blackstock Road, the estate's main artery. The estate of Lowedges (Lowedges Crescent) is also used, although it is portrayed as being part of the same area in the storyline. Many residents are of the opinion Gleadless Valley has not changed much in the 50 years since it was built, and this possibly influenced Meadows choice to film there. Other notable local venues for filming include Leighton Road, Gaunt Road, Blackstock Road Shopping Precinct and Norton Lane. The school in which Shaun sits his history exam is Gladys Buxton school in Dronfield as nearby Gleadless Valley Comprehensive School was closed and demolished in the 1990s. Gladys Buxton School is disused, and its mid-1980s design suited the time period. Students in years 10 and 11 of local secondary school Dronfield Henry Fanshawe School were used as extras, playing Shaun's classmates who are also sitting the exam, that were shown within the first eight minutes of the first episode. Sheffield landmarks such as the Park Hill Flats and Neepsend Gasholder are also seen.

As in the film, the exact setting is unclear. The setting in the film was implied to be a coastal town in the English East Midlands (Grimsby was used in filming the coastal scenes). In the first episode, Woody and Lol ride on a Yorkshire Rider bus to their wedding from a bus stop in Gaunt Road, a bus company which operated in West Yorkshire in the 1980s. This now-preserved bus was supplied by Transport Yorkshire Preservation Group of Leeds.

== Episodes ==
=== Episode 1 ===
In the prologue, Combo and 13-year-old Shaun sit alone in Combo's blood-stained car, having just rushed Milky to the hospital (after Combo snapped and beat him into unconsciousness in the original film). Following a moment of silence, Shaun bids Combo farewell and leaves.

Going forward three years, Woody and Lol's wedding ends disastrously by Woody's reluctance to marry Lol, and Meggy suffers a near-fatal heart attack in the toilets of the licensed private wedding venue. After Shaun sits his final exam in history, he gets hassled by Flip (Perry Fitzpatrick) and his gang of moped-riding casuals. Flip orders Shaun to help him stage Flip defending his crush Gemma from a staged insult from Shaun. Gemma sees through this act and Flip, in his anger, assaults Shaun, leaving him bloodied. He is found by Lol's mother and taken to the same hospital as Meggy, where he reunites with Smell, but does not join the rest of the gang in Meggy's room. After urging from his mother, Shaun later gets a job working in a video rentals shop owned by Mr. Sandhu, the Indian shopkeeper with whom Shaun had a feud in the first film but is now close friends with both Shaun and his mother.

=== Episode 2 ===
Woody and the gang stop by Shaun's house and welcome him back into their group. Meanwhile, Lol finds out that her father, Mick, has returned to the family home; she insinuates that she was sexually abused by him as a young girl. Lol tries to warn her mother and Kelly that people like Mick cannot change, but her mother responds by telling her to "fuck off out of [my] house". Feeling betrayed by her mother and neglected by Woody, Lol confides in Milky, with whom she starts having casual sex. Gadget, meanwhile, learns of his feelings for Lol's sister, Kelly but after he sees Kelly kissing another boy and is devastated, he starts to go out with Trudy the wedding receptionist, and discovers that she has a son, Winston, with Meggy from a previous affair (something she has callously kept secret from Meggy so that she won't have to share custody of Winston with him). Meanwhile, Shaun finds out that his mother has been having a secret relationship with Mr. Sandhu, who plans for him to move in with them. Insinuating that his mother slept with Mr. Sandhu in order to get him a job and disgusted at her actions, Shaun angrily leaves home. Feeling guilty, Mr. Sandhu leaves the household in hopes that Shaun will go back home.

=== Episode 3 ===
Lol continues her casual affair with Milky, but Milky starts to feel guilty when an upset Woody confides in him about his failing relationship with Lol. Gadget is bullied and isolated from his friends by a controlling, sexually charged Trudy, so he decides to end their unusual eight-day relationship after urging from Harvey, who tells him that Trudy has had sex with Woody, Milky, Meggy, Gadget and himself, and also realises that Winston is Meggy's son after seeing them playing on the Commodore 64 together (Meggy himself fails to notice Winston's resemblance to him, due to Winston being dressed up as Dogtanian).

Later, during an improvised football session on a large residential estate (the iconic Park Hill Flats in Sheffield were used for this scene), the gang are confronted by Flip and his moped gang, who want to beat Shaun up as revenge for the incident with Gemma. Lambretta-riding Woody mockingly refers to the mopeds as "hairdryers", and, as the tension escalates, it breaks out into a fight between Woody's and Flip's gangs, resulting in Police intervention.

Shaun, meanwhile, reunites with Smell, and on her advice, returns home to apologise to his mother and give his blessing on her relationship with Mr. Sandhu. Lol starts to drown her sorrows and distances herself away from both of her lovers, especially when Milky fearfully does not defend Lol against Mick when he visits her to deny her allegations of sexual abuse. Meanwhile, Trev stops by Lol's parents' house to meet up with Kelly, and she awkwardly watches the football match with Mick. Mick violently rapes Trev and immediately after tells her to leave. Meanwhile, as Shaun, his mother and Smell watch the football match, a drunken and bloodied Combo stumbles into the living room and collapses on the floor.

=== Episode 4 ===
After waking, Combo informs Shaun and Smell that his mother is dying. Shaun takes him to see his mother, but when they get there they discover she has already died. Combo says goodbye to his mother's body. Meanwhile, Milky teases Woody about the fact that he left Lol at the altar. In response, Woody tells him they will get married that day. Woody and Milky go around inviting all their friends to their wedding, which is going to be a surprise to Lol.

After much deliberation, Trev tells Lol that she was raped by Mick. Lol tells her go to sleep. She then goes to Mick's house, armed with a hammer to confront him, just as Mick is in the process of abandoning the household again. Lol accuses Mick of raping Trev and presents the hammer, indicating that she intends to kill him with it, and he responds by attacking her. He pulls off her underwear and attempts to rape her, but Lol defends herself by swinging the hammer against Mick's head several times which stuns him. With Mick lying prone on the floor, Lol decides to strike him again, killing him. Combo then arrives at the house, finding the scene of Mick dead and Lol sobbing.

Combo, who as a teenager once tried to beat Mick up for molesting Lol only for Mick to beat him and send him to the hospital, decides to "do a good thing," smearing his and Mick's fingerprints over the hammer and injuring himself with Mick's hand to make it look as if he fought and killed Mick in Lol's defence, knowing that Lol will likely be sent to prison even if the truth is proven. The episode ends with Combo arriving in prison, after being charged with manslaughter. Most of the cast sit in the pub watching the England v Argentina World Cup game, which England goes on to lose, due to Maradona's infamous "Hand of God" and famous Goal of the Century. Shaun also has sex with Smell in the pub toilets. Meanwhile, Lol, Kelly, Trev, Milky and Woody sit alone together, listening to the game on the radio whilst playing cards. Kelly cries and Woody and Lol kiss as Combo peacefully enters his cell.

== Reception ==
The miniseries had an average rating of 2.93 million viewers, 2.5 million of which watched the first episode, leading to the commissioning of sequels. These ratings were up 38% on the average figures for Channel 4's 11PM timeslot.

The Guardian's Sam Wollaston said that the first episode "breathed life into [Meadows'] characters again... it's still bleak, as you'd expect. At times touching, at others funny".

The rape scene in episode 3 provoked a strong reaction on online forums and social networking sites, with many viewers finding it a difficult scene to watch. Channel 4 broadcast the number for a rape crisis helpline at the end of the episode.

== Cast ==
- Thomas Turgoose as Shaun Fields
- Vicky McClure as Frances Lorraine "Lol" Jenkins
- Joe Gilgun as Richard "Woody" Woodford
- Andrew Shim as Michael "Milky"
- Stephen Graham as Andrew "Combo" Gascoigne
- Johnny Harris as Michael "Mick" Jenkins
- Rosamund Hanson as Michelle "Smell"
- Chanel Cresswell as Kelly Jenkins
- Danielle Watson as Trev
- Andrew Ellis as Gary "Gadget" Flowers
- Michael Socha as Harvey
- Perry Benson as Ronald "Meggy" Megford
- George Newton as Banjo
- Katherine Dow Blyton as Christine "Chrissy" Jenkins
- Hannah Walters as Trudy
- Jo Hartley as Cynthia Fields
- Kriss Dosanjh as Mr. Sandhu
- Perry Fitzpatrick as Flip
- Joseph Dempsie as Higgy
- Georgia May Foote as Gemma
- Olivia Morgan as Bub
- Jamie Taylor as Buloosweet
- Steve Brody as Richard Woodford, Sr.
- Rebecca Manley as Barbara Woodford
- Adam Hunt as Winston
- Ian Brown as Police Constable #1
- William Travis as Mr. Squires

== Soundtrack ==
This Is England '86 Soundtrack

Soundtrack album by various artists
- Released: 27 September 2010
- Genres: Rock, pop, reggae, new wave, jazz rock
- Labels: Universal International, UMTV

Shane Meadows film soundtracks chronology
Somers Town (2008)	This Is England '86 Soundtrack (2010)

=== Track listing ===
1. "Happy Hour" – The Housemartins
2. "Wonderful World, Beautiful People" – Jimmy Cliff
3. "Gadget And Harvey in Garden (Dialogue)" – Andrew Ellis, Michael Socha
4. "My Girl" – Madness
5. "The Bitterest Pill" – The Jam
6. "Solo" – Ludovico Einaudi
7. "Fast Cars" – Buzzcocks
8. "Flip Before Fight (Dialogue)" – Perry Fitzpatrick
9. "All Through The City" – Dr. Feelgood
10. "99 Red Balloons" – Nena
11. "Woody & Squire (Dialogue)" – Joe Gilgun
12. "We've Got The World at Our Feet" – 1986 FIFA World Cup Mexico England Squad
13. "Rainmaker" – Spear of Destiny
14. "Walls Come Tumbling Down" – The Style Council
15. "Ora" – Ludovico Einaudi
16. "Red Red Wine" – UB40
17. "Greeting to the New Brunette" – Billy Bragg
18. "Ying And Yang (Dialogue)" - Hannah Graham
19. "Guava Jelly" – Johnny Nash
20. "Ancora" – Ludovico Einaudi
21. "Give It Up" – Lee Dorsey
22. "It Miek" – Desmond Dekker
23. "Woody & Milk in Bathroom (Dialogue)" – Joe Gilgun, Andrew Shim
24. "Ruler of My Heart" – Irma Thomas
25. "English Rose" – The Jam
26. "Questa Volta" – Ludovico Einaudi
27. "Man of the World" – Fleetwood Mac

Additional music from the series:

1. "What Difference Does It Make?" – The Smiths
2. "This Charming Man" – The Smiths
3. "Asleep" – The Smiths
4. "This Is The Day" – The The
5. "Frozen Dub" – Augustus Pablo
6. "There Must Be An Angel (Playing with My Heart)" – Eurythmics
7. "My Own True Love" – Margaret Whiting
8. "Ballblazer" – Peter Langston
9. "Night Train" – The Rudies
10. "Ritornare" – Ludovico Einaudi
11. "Dna" – Ludovico Einaudi
12. "In Volo" – Ludovico Einaudi
13. "The Crane Dance" – Ludovico Einaudi
14. "Berlin Song" – Ludovico Einaudi

From the Channel 4 TV advert:

1. "Under Me Sleng Teng" – Wayne Smith
