= Preschool (film) =

2026 comedy film

- Release poster
- Directed by: Josh Duhamel
- Screenplay by: Richard D’ovidio
- Produced by: Josh Duhamel; Michael J. Luisi
- Starring: Josh Duhamel; Michael Socha; Antonia Thomas; Charity Wakefield; Fenella Woolgar; James Cosmo
- Cinematography: Arthur Mulhern
- Edited by: Mark Williams
- Music by: Adem Ilhan
- Production companies: Dakotakid Productions; The Long Game
- Distributed by: Republic Pictures
- Release date: March 17, 2026
- Running time: 104 minutes
- Country: United States
- Language: English

Preschool is a 2026 American comedy film directed by and starring Josh Duhamel from a script by Richard D’ovidio. The film has an ensemble cast also featuring Michael Socha, Antonia Thomas, Charity Wakefield, Fenella Woolgar and James Cosmo.

== Premise ==
Two fathers become engaged in a battle to try and enroll their children into a desirable preschool.

== Cast ==
- Josh Duhamel as Alan
- Michael Socha as Brian
- Antonia Thomas as Sarah
- Charity Wakefield as Lauren
- Fenella Woolgar as Mrs. Lawrence
- James Cosmo as Joe

== Production ==
The comedy film is directed by and starring Josh Duhamel. The script was written by Richard D’ovidio, based on a story by Richard and Nicole D’ovidio. Duhamel is a producer alongside Michael J. Luisi.

Duhamel is joined in the cast by Michael Socha, Antonia Thomas, Charity Wakefield, Fenella Woolgar and James Cosmo.

Principal photography took place in London in the United Kingdom from February 2025, with Arthur Mulhern as the cinematographer. Mark Williams edited the film.

== Release ==
The film was released digitally in the United States on March 17, 2026. It also screened at the 26th Fargo Film Festival on March 18, 2026.
