= The Secret Agent (2016 TV series) =

British television series

- Genre: Drama; Espionage
- Based on: The Secret Agent by Joseph Conrad
- Written by: Tony Marchant
- Screenplay by: Tony Marchant
- Directed by: Charles McDougall
- Starring: Toby Jones; Vicky McClure; Stephen Graham; David Dawson; Ian Hart
- Composer: Stuart Earl
- Country of origin: United Kingdom
- Original language: English
- No. of series: 1
- No. of episodes: 3

Production
- Executive producers: Simon Heath; Tony Marchant
- Producer: Rob Bullock
- Cinematography: Michael Snyman
- Running time: 58 minutes
- Production company: World Productions

Original release
- Network: BBC One
- Release: 17 July – 31 July 2016

Related
- The Secret Agent 1975; The Secret Agent 1992

The Secret Agent is a three-part British espionage television drama serial based on the 1907 novel The Secret Agent by Joseph Conrad. The show stars Toby Jones, Vicky McClure, Stephen Graham, David Dawson and Ian Hart. The three-part series began airing on BBC One on 17 July 2016. It is the fourth BBC adaptation of the novel, others having previously been made in 1967, 1972 and 1992.

== Background ==
In 2014 the BBC ordered a three-part television series based on the novel. It was filmed around the United Kingdom from October to December 2015, with Toby Jones, Vicky McClure, and Stephen Graham in leading roles. The series was written by Tony Marchant, directed by Charles McDougall and produced by Priscilla Parish.

RLJ Entertainment-owned Acorn will distribute The Secret Agent in the United States. Kew Media distributes the series worldwide.

== Cast ==
- Toby Jones as Mr Anton Verloc, a businessman running a sex shop in London's Soho who is being secretly paid by the Russian embassy to spy on revolutionary groups. In Conrad's original novel, Verloc's first name is Adolf, but Jones stated in an interview that "no one can be called Adolf anymore". The Verloc character in the 1936 film Sabotage was also renamed Anton.
- Vicky McClure as Winnie, Verloc's wife who married him not for love, but to provide a home for her mother and autistic brother, Stevie, and so they could all escape from her abusive father.
- Charlie Hamblett as Stevie
- Marie Critchley as Jessie, Winnie and Stevie's mother
- Stephen Graham as Chief Inspector Heat who hates anarchists, believing them to be amateurish.
- Ian Hart as The Professor, the most nihilistic member of the anarchists. His nickname comes from the fact that he wears a lab coat.
- Tom Goodman-Hill as Assistant Commissioner Stone of Scotland Yard, an executive rank police officer with ambition who wants to give the Home Secretary answers about the rise of anarchism and wants to preserve his position in society.
- David Dawson as Vladimir, the First Secretary of the Russian Embassy who speaks English with a received pronunciation.
- George Costigan as Sir Ethelred who holds a threatening pressure over Stone and is politically savvy with an edge.
- Ash Hunter as Hedges
- Raphael Acloque as Ossipon
- Penny Downie as Lady Blackwood
- Tom Vaughan-Lawlor as Michaelis
- Christopher Fairbank as Yundt

== Episodes ==
No.	Title	Directed by	Written by	Original release date	UK viewers (millions)
1	"Episode 1"	Charles McDougall	Tony Marchant	17 July 2016	5.97
2	"Episode 2"	Charles McDougall	Tony Marchant	24 July 2016	3.72
3	"Episode 3"	Charles McDougall	Tony Marchant	31 July 2016	Under 3.35

== Critical reception ==
Reviewing the first episode for The Guardian, Stephen Moss began by noting the bravery of adapting a book "which film critic Roger Ebert called 'perhaps the least filmable novel [Conrad] ever wrote'". Moss observed that, "In the book, the first secretary makes a brilliant, witty, scathing case for attacking science – indeed, attacking time itself, since Greenwich marks the prime meridian – but on TV we have to be shown it. The mystery, the enigma, the idea that an attack on the very idea of time is all that will shock the English middle class is lost. That, in essence, is the problem here: all the workings must be shown. Conrad's great, strange, tonally complex novel is reduced to a psychological thriller." He added, "You would never know from watching it that The Secret Agent is in some respects a funny book, certainly a deeply ironic one. Conrad based Verloc's attempt to bomb the observatory on a real incident in which a half-baked anarchist blew himself up, and his description of it in a later preface to the novel should be the starting point for any treatment. He called the ill-fated terrorist attack 'a blood-stained inanity of so fatuous a kind that it was impossible to fathom its origin by any reasonable or even unreasonable process of thought'".

In The Daily Telegraph, Gerard O'Donovan found that in the second episode,

There is such a dearth of decent human beings in The Secret Agent (BBC One) that it makes for a deeply uncomfortable viewing. Set at the precise point where political idealism and terrorism intersect, it features such cynicism at its core that, even 109 years since it was published, it feels utterly contemporary. Revolutionaries are portrayed as egoists and mad men. The concern for humanity loftily expressed by radicals and idealists is depicted as rarely extending beyond concern for themselves, let alone that of the ordinary man in the street.

However, he judged that the episode "had rather more bite than the first". O'Donovan added, "Marchant's skilful untangling of Conrad's over-complicated plot brought all this to the fore without sacrificing too much in the way of subtlety or surprise", before concluding: "It could have been the climax to a lesser drama. But with another full hour to go, the one thing that seems guaranteed by The Secret Agent is an even murkier – and perhaps still more affecting – trawl through a dark night of the human soul that, despite being dressed up in Victorian garb, feels wholly relevant to right now."

The third episode was not so well received. Many aspects of the original storyline had been changed, and the version was not entirely coherent. O'Donovan wrote that "the finale's relentless, drawn-out descent into bleakness quenched each spark as soon as it ignited. No one came out of this well. In the end you have to ask what was the point of making such a drama when it offered neither entertainment nor enlightenment on a subject so relevant to our times." He awarded it only two stars out of five.
