= The Hatching =

2014 British comedy horror film

- Promotional release poster
- Directed by: Michael Anderson
- Written by: Michael Anderson; Nick Squire
- Produced by: Chantelle de Carvalho; Nigel Wooll
- Starring: Andrew-Lee Potts; Jack McMullen; Laura Aikman; Thomas Turgoose; Justin Lee Collins
- Production company: Sabre Films
- Release date: 22 November 2014 (FilmBath)
- Running time: 90 minutes
- Country: United Kingdom
- Language: English
- Budget: $5 million

The Hatching is a 2014 British black comedy horror film directed and co-written by Michael Anderson. It stars Andrew-Lee Potts, Jack McMullen, Laura Aikman, Thomas Turgoose and Justin Lee Collins. The film's plot follows Tim (Potts), a man who returns to his hometown in Somerset, England, to find that the locals are being menaced by killer crocodiles.

The Hatching premiered at the Bath Film Festival in November 2014.

== Cast ==
- Andrew-Lee Potts as Tim
- Thomas Turgoose as Caesar
- Laura Aikman as Lucy
- Jack McMullen as Russell
- Georgia Henshaw as Britney
- Danny Kirrane as Lardy
- Muzz Khan as Baghi
- Justin Lee Collins as Uncle Stan
- Deborah Rosan as Cheryl Coal
- Stevie Alexandria Maxwell as Villager
- Abigail Hamilton as Miss Dunstan
- Hazel Atherton as Mrs. Wembridge

== Production ==
Filming took place in November and December 2013 in West Pennard. Around 60 to 70 Somerset residents volunteered to be background extras, playing such roles as villagers and pub patrons.

During production, a crocodile was reported as being sighted in central Bristol, leading members of the public to contact the film's production team, concerned that one of the crocodiles used during filming may have escaped. The animal trainer for the film, Aria Das Neves, stated that, "While we can confirm we did film with live crocodiles I have contacted the relevant holding zoos and they confirm that all our crocodiles are accounted for."

== Release ==
The Hatching premiered at the Bath Film Festival in Bath, Somerset, on 22 November 2014. A trailer for the film was later released in April 2015.

== Home media ==
The Hatching was released on DVD in 2016.
