= This Is England '88 =

2011 British drama series

- Genre: Drama
- Created by: Shane Meadows
- Based on: Characters by Shane Meadows
- Written by: Shane Meadows; Jack Thorne
- Directed by: Shane Meadows
- Starring: Vicky McClure; Joe Gilgun; Thomas Turgoose; Andrew Shim; Chanel Cresswell; Danielle Watson; Andrew Ellis
- Composer: Ludovico Einaudi
- Country of origin: United Kingdom
- Original language: English
- No. of series: 1
- No. of episodes: 3

Production
- Executive producer: Libby Durdy
- Producer: Rebekah Wray-Rogers
- Running time: 48-51 minutes
- Production companies: Warp Films; Big Arty Productions

Original release
- Network: Channel 4
- Release: 13 December – 15 December 2011

Related
- This Is England; This Is England '86; This Is England '90

This Is England '88 is a 2011 British drama miniseries written by Shane Meadows and Jack Thorne as a spin-off from the 2006 film This Is England. It is also a sequel to the 2010 television sequel-series This Is England '86, set two and a half years later and starring as previously Thomas Turgoose as Shaun, Vicky McClure as Lol and Joe Gilgun as Woody.

== Plot ==
Set during Christmas 1988, Lol is haunted by the devastating events that took place two and a half years before. She and Woody both find themselves struggling to cope with their lives without each other after he leaves the gang. Lol is carrying the burden of her guilt, whilst Woody is trying to build a domestic life with a new girlfriend and a potential promotion at work. Shaun has started at drama college and, although still in a relationship with Smell, he has grown close to a girl performing in his Christmas play.

== Cast ==
- Thomas Turgoose as Shaun Fields
- Vicky McClure as Frances Lorraine "Lol" Jenkins
- Joe Gilgun as Richard "Woody" Woodford
- Andrew Shim as Michael "Milky"
- Rosamund Hanson as Michelle "Smell"
- Chanel Cresswell as Kelly Jenkins
- Danielle Watson as Trev
- Andrew Ellis as Gary "Gadget" Flowers
- Michael Socha as Harvey
- George Newton as Banjo
- Stephen Graham as Andrew "Combo" Gascoigne
- Johnny Harris as Michael "Mick" Jenkins
- Katherine Dow Blyton as Christine "Chrissy" Jenkins
- Jo Hartley as Cynthia Fields
- Kriss Dosanjh as Mr. Sandhu
- Stacey Sampson as Jennifer
- Steve Brody as Richard Woodford, Sr.
- Rebecca Manley as Barbara Woodford
- Helen Behan as Evelyn (Lol's Nurse)
- William Travis as Mr. Squires
- Charlotte Tyree as Fay
- Hannah Walters as Trudy
- Ryan Barr as Billy
- Lyra Mae Thomas as Lisa

Ronald "Meggy" Megford does not appear, his absence being explained on Twitter by producer Mark Herbert as having died off-screen in 1987. This decision was later reversed however, as he briefly appears in This Is England '90.

== Episodes ==
=== Episode 1 ===
The story takes place in late December 1988 with the first episode starting on 23 December. Lol is haunted by visions of her dead father Mick – whom she killed in the previous series when he tried to rape her – and is struggling to cope as a single parent with her young daughter, Lisa, who is a result of her affair with Milky two and a half years prior. Lol's affair has also led to Woody's self-imposed exile from the gang, but he has begun to rebuild his life. He has a new girlfriend, Jennifer, whom his parents adore, and has been offered a promotion at work. Smell and Shaun are still together, but growing distant. Shaun develops his creative side on a college drama course, and grows close to Fay, a girl performing in his Christmas play. Milky is welcomed back into the gang after spending some time away, but after Woody sees them together in the pub, old wounds re-appear.

=== Episode 2 ===
Despite Woody's misgivings about the responsibilities associated with a promotion, he is seemingly convinced after a dinner out with Jennifer and his boss. Lol turns to a religious, concerned paediatric nurse for help, and finally pays a visit to Combo in prison. She thanks him for having always been there to support her, and apologises for the way she treated him when he returned to the gang five and a half years prior. Shaun takes centre-stage for his acting debut, and Smell's suspicions are heightened when she walks in on him and Fay 'rehearsing' a kiss backstage before the performance. Fay has a party at her house to celebrate the success of the play, and Shaun finds her upstairs alone in her bedroom. The two talk about their growing feelings for each other and despite agreeing not to get any more serious, they are unable to control their passions and end up having sex. Smell arrives at Fay's house intending to apologise to Shaun for her jealousy earlier in the evening, but walks in on Shaun and Fay in bed. Smell angrily breaks up with Shaun and storms out, leaving him devastated.

=== Episode 3 ===
As Christmas Eve turns to Christmas Day, Shaun is devastated after Smell caught him cheating at the after-show party. Mum Cynthia and Mr. Sandhu (now a surrogate father to Shaun) comfort Shaun and promise him that Smell will eventually forgive him.

Meanwhile, most of the gang is out getting merry until they bump into Woody and Jennifer. It is revealed that Woody didn't find out about Lol and Milky's affair until the birth of a mixed-race daughter, Lisa. A distraught Woody, revealing he'd earlier attempted suicide, cannot control his rage and attacks Milky, who refuses to fight back or walk away. The others break up the fight and lead Milky away, with Woody repeatedly screaming how he loved Milky like a brother. Woody calls Milky a "snake in the grass," repeating what Combo had accused Woody of being in 1983. Woody eventually realises he can never love Jennifer as much as he loved Lol, and they agree to end their relationship and remain friends.

Lol seeks solace in a midnight mass service, but it does not ease her pain, and she has visions of Mick again. Feeling unable to cope any longer, and consumed with guilt over Combo's prison sentence, Lol takes an overdose of Paracetamol. Trev and Kelly find her and rush her to the hospital where her stomach is pumped. Trev, after being unable to contact Woody by telephone, goes to his parents' house, where they are all opening Christmas presents. On hearing of Lol's suicide attempt, Woody rushes to the hospital, where he finds Lol's bed empty. He immediately thinks she has died, but Lol's mother and friends (including Milky) inform him that she is alive, doing well and is nearby having a smoke. Woody and Milky finally make up, and Woody goes to talk alone with Lol. She tells him about her emotional problems, and the truth about her father's murder. Visibly shaken, but touched by Combo's sacrifice, Woody tells Lol he still loves her and can't be with anyone else.

The episode ends with Woody and Lol in each other's arms, and then cuts to various members of the gang – including Combo in his prison cell, eating his Christmas meal with a plastic fork. Shaun is shown having Christmas dinner with his mother and Mr. Sandhu, but still miserable over losing Smell.

== Reception ==
Writing for The Guardian, Euan Ferguson said that it "was all phenomenal" and "roll on their next story". Paddy Shennan writing for the Liverpool Echo also rated the series, calling it the best drama series of 2011. Less favourable reviews saw Hugh Montgomery, writing for The Independent, suggest that the misery depicted was "increasingly irritating," whilst also suggesting that the series did not equal the standard of previous installments. The series won the award for Best Mini-Series at the 2012 British Academy Television Awards, and also led to a Best Actor nomination for Joseph Gilgun (Woody) and a second successive Best Actress nomination for Vicky McClure (Lol).
