= Joe Gilgun =

English actor (born 1984)

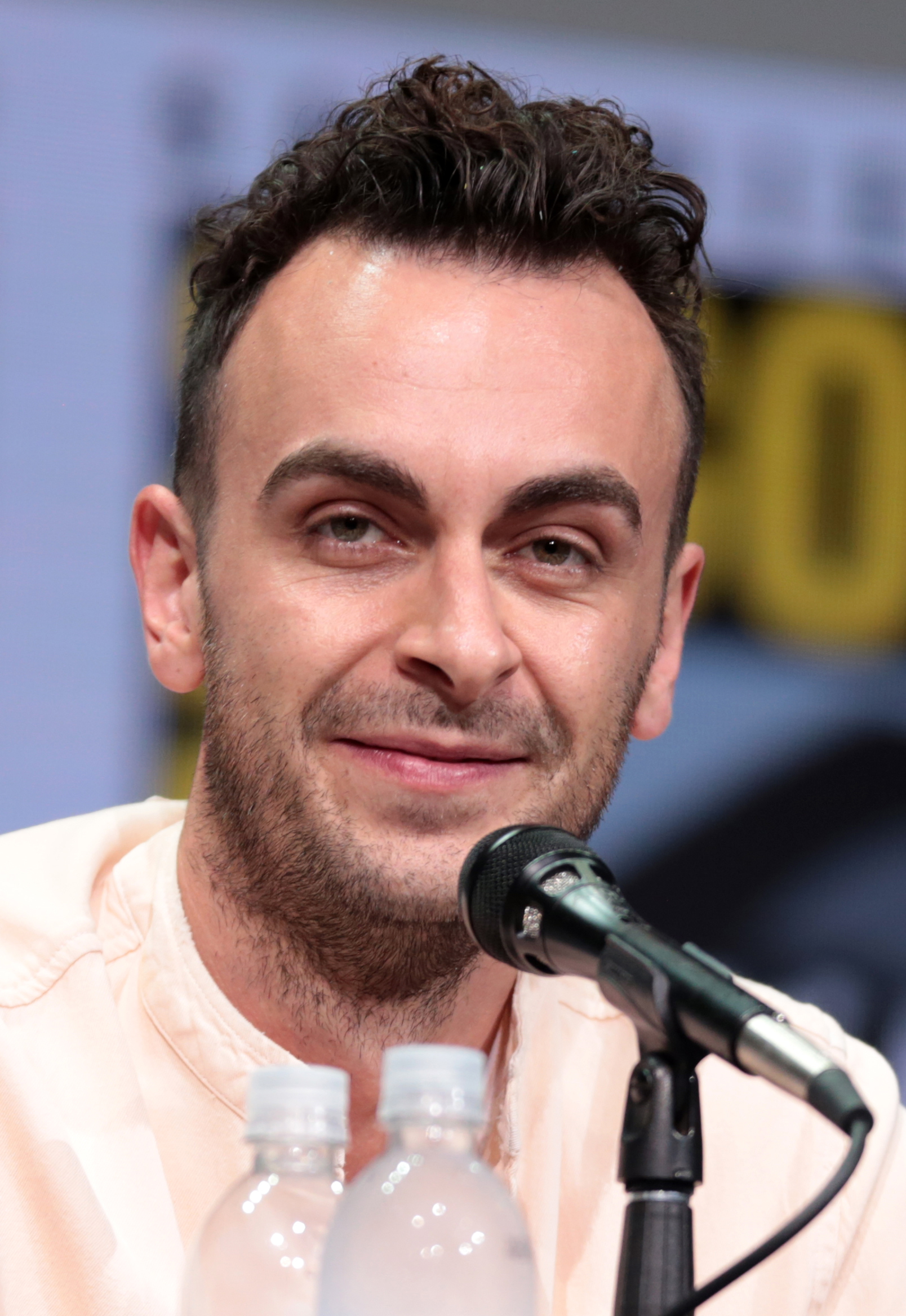
- Gilgun at the 2017 San Diego Comic-Con promoting Preacher
- Born: Joseph William Gilgun; 9 March 1984 (age 42); Chorley, Lancashire, England
- Occupations: Actor; television producer
- Years active: 1994–present

Joseph William Gilgun (born 9 March 1984) is an English actor and producer known for several roles, including that of Vinnie O'Neill in the Sky Max series Brassic, which he also co-created, Marcus in Hollyoaks, Eli Dingle in the ITV soap opera Emmerdale, Jamie Armstrong in the ITV soap opera Coronation Street, Woody in the film This Is England (2006) and its subsequent spin-off series, and Rudy Wade in E4's Misfits. From 2016 to 2019, he starred in the AMC television adaptation of the Vertigo comic Preacher as the Irish vampire Cassidy.

== Early life ==
Gilgun was born in Chorley, Lancashire, to Judith and Andrew Gilgun. He grew up in Rivington, Lancashire, as part of a working-class family with his two younger sisters, Jennie Seddon and Rosie Thomson. Gilgun attended Rivington VA Primary School and Southlands High School. He has dyslexia and ADHD, which he describes as the "biggest pain of [his] life" and in interviews has openly discussed depression and anxiety. He started drama workshops at the age of eight, following advice from an educational psychologist, and was described as having "exceptional talent". He also trained at the Laine Johnson Theatre School and the Oldham Theatre Workshop. When he was 10, he got his first TV acting role in Coronation Street. He stayed with the show until he was thirteen years old.

Gilgun studied A-Levels at Runshaw College. Outside of odd jobs and a few roles in small theatre productions, Gilgun worked as a plasterer until returning to acting full-time with Emmerdale in 2006.

== Career ==
=== 1994–2006: Early career ===
As a child actor, Gilgun played little tearaway Jamie Armstrong in Coronation Street between 1994 and 1997. He left the soap when the actress playing his on-screen mother left the show. Gilgun revisited the set in an ITV special The Kids from Coronation Street in 2004. In 1998, when he was 14 years old, he presented a feature on Wish You Were Here...? where he visited Phantasialand, one of Germany's largest theme parks.

Gilgun took a break in his teens, acting part-time in local and national stage productions including the Salford-based Hanky Park the Musical at The Lowry. He played Charlie Millwall in a critically acclaimed tour of the stage play Borstal Boy, which ended at the Edinburgh Fringe Festival.

Gilgun found the break from acting difficult, telling The Guardian in December 2011 that "[I] went off the fucking rails" and became confused about what to do with his life. He ended up working as a plasterer.

=== 2006–2015: This is England franchise and Misfits ===
He returned to acting full-time in 2006, when he won the roles of both trouble-prone Eli Dingle in long-running soap opera Emmerdale and kind-hearted skinhead Woody in This Is England, his debut as a film actor. This Is England was released in the UK on 27 April 2007 and subsequently won several awards including a BAFTA for Best British Film in 2008.

In 2007, Gilgun starred alongside welterweight boxing champion Michael Jennings in a locally produced feature-length documentary entitled Chorley: Where People Go to Fight. All proceeds went to Derian House Children's Hospice, with Gilgun helping to present the cheque. Additionally, he appeared in a Dingle-centred episode of Ghosthunting with... hosted by Yvette Fielding.

Gilgun was granted time off from Emmerdale to shoot the 2009 British crime thriller Harry Brown, where he played drug dealer Kenny Soames. Gilgun announced he would leave Emmerdale on 10 November 2009, feeling the time was right to move on. His last appearance was on 30 April 2010. An Emmerdale representative said the programme had not ruled out a future return for the character. Gilgun later indicated he currently had no such plans.

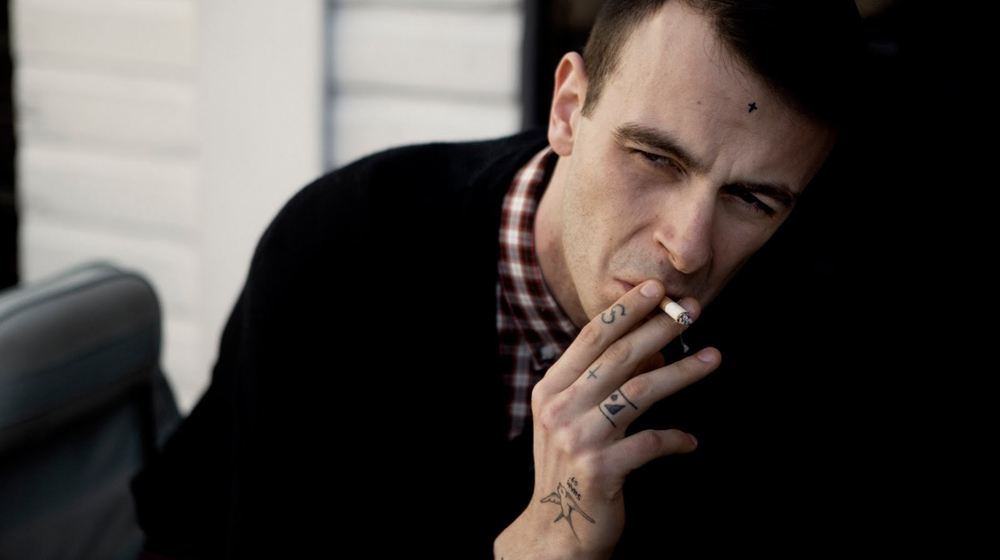
Gilgun on the set of This Is England

Gilgun reprised the character of Woody for three Channel 4 TV spin-off series of This Is England, called This Is England '86. and This is England '88 and This Is England '90, which aired in September 2010, December 2011 and 2015 respectively. In 2010, This is England writer-director Shane Meadows referred Gilgun to star in longtime collaborator Paul Fraser's music video for the song "Dead American Writers" by Tired Pony.

On 9 May 2011, it was announced that Gilgun had been cast as newcomer Rudy Wade in the third series of Misfits. The character Rudy can manifest a clone of himself that roughly represents his conscience. He appeared in the first episode of the third series in late October 2011. He replaced as lead the character of Nathan following the departure of Robert Sheehan. An online short called Vegas Baby covered Nathan Young's exit and Rudy's arrival. Gilgun said that replacing Sheehan had "been frightening... You'd think that it'd be a total ballache, what with being new and stuff and Rob doing such a good job".

In the following years, Gilgun appeared in the 2012 American science fiction film Lockout, co-written and produced by Luc Besson and starring Guy Pearce, the 2013 BBC series Ripper Street as a Fagin-type character, Carmichael, as well as starring in the final two series of Misfits. He appears in the music video for "Tiny Legs" by Then Thickens, released in 2014. Having been friends with a few members of the band from growing up around Chorley, Joe agreed to star in the video. It involved him having makeup, flour and eggs applied to his face amongst other things and took several, messy takes to get right.

In 2015, Gilgun played Ellic in Breck Eisner's The Last Witch Hunter alongside Michael Caine, Vin Diesel, and Elijah Wood.

=== 2015–present: Continuing work with television ===
In March 2015 Gilgun earned the role of drug-addicted, Irish vampire Cassidy, one of the main characters in the AMC series Preacher. Speaking of the casting of Gilgun, Preacher executive producer Seth Rogen said: "It's one of those things that happens only a few times throughout your career, where you just go 'Oh, it's you. You're the character that is written on the page'... You could tell Joe's lived like 100 lifetimes, and he's probably done some shit you do not want to hear about, but at the same time, he's one of the most fun, loving people you'll ever be around. And it was exactly what the character needed to be."

In Spring 2015, Gilgun both filmed the pilot episode of Preacher, as well as The Infiltrator, a 2016 crime thriller film starring Bryan Cranston.

Gilgun was part of the main cast of all four series of Preacher which premiered on 22 May 2016 and concluded on 29 September 2019. Additionally, Gilgun was also an executive producer of the show, producing half of its third series and all of its fourth.

In 2019, Gilgun created, executive produced, and starred in the Sky One comedy series Brassic. Gilgun stars as Vinnie, a working-class petty criminal living in Northern England. The six-episode series premiere on 22 August 2019. The series was well-reviewed and received a second series renewal before the first series had aired.

The show's third series was broadcast in October 2021. Filming for Brassic's 4th series started in August 2021. In August 2021, prior to the airing of the third series, a fourth began filming and premiered on 7 September 2022. In August 2022, the series was renewed for a fifth series, and started filming that month to premiere in 2023.

Season 6 of Brassic aired in 2024 with 7 episodes. The seventh and final season of Brassic, "The Final Farewell", was broadcast from 25 September 2025 on Sky and NOW, marking a "full-throttle farewell" for the show.

== Personal life ==
Gilgun has developed a close relationship with his co-stars from This Is England, referring to them in interviews as "the gang".

He has opened up in podcasts and various media sources about his bipolar disorder and the effects that it has had on his life. He has stated that many of the stories within the show Brassic are based upon his life.

== Filmography ==
=== Film ===
Year	Title	Role	Notes
2006	This Is England	Richard "Woody" Woodford	
2009	Harry Brown	Kenneth "Kenny" Soames	
2010	Top of the Range	Joe	Short (10 minutes)
2011	Screwed	Karl	
2012	Lockout	Hydell	
2013	Tennis	Jerry	Short (23 minutes)
2014	Pride	Mike Jackson	
2015	The Last Witch Hunter	Ellic	
2016	The Infiltrator	Dominic	

=== Television ===
Year	Title	Role	Notes
1994–1997	Coronation Street	Jamie Armstrong	Series regular (107 episodes)
1998	Wish You Were Here...?	Guest Presenter	Guest
2004	Hollyoaks	Marcus	Guest
2005	Shameless	Rico	Season 2, episode 2
2005	Big Dippers	Carl	Television film
2006	Sorted	Car Mechanic	Season 1, episode 5
2006–2010	Emmerdale	Eli Dingle	Series regular (400 episodes)
2010	This Is England '86	Richard "Woody" Woodford	TV series (4 episodes)
2011	This Is England '88	Richard "Woody" Woodford	TV series (3 episodes)
2011–2013	Misfits	Rudy Wade	TV series (series 3–5)
2013	Ripper Street	Carmichael	Season 1, episode 2
2013	Coming Up	Martin	Series 8, episode 1
2015	This Is England '90	Richard "Woody" Woodford	TV series (4 episodes)
2016–2019	Preacher	Proinsias Cassidy	Main character, also executive producer
2019–2025	Brassic	Vincent "Vinnie" O'Neill	Main character, also creator and executive producer

== Awards and nominations ==
Year	Result	Award	Category	Film or series	Character
2006	Nominated	British Independent Film Awards	Best Supporting Actor/Actress	This is England	Richard "Woody" Woodford
2007	Nominated	British Soap Awards	Best Newcomer	Emmerdale	Eli Dingle
2007	Nominated	National Television Awards	Most Popular Newcomer	Emmerdale	Eli Dingle
2007	Nominated	TV Quick and TV Choice Awards	Best Soap Newcomer	Emmerdale	Eli Dingle
2008	Nominated	Digital Spy Awards	Villain of the Year	Emmerdale	Eli Dingle
2012	Won	Virgin Media TV Awards	Best Newbie	Misfits	Rudy Wade
2012	Won	SFX Awards	Breakout Star	Misfits	Rudy Wade
2012	Nominated	BAFTA Television Awards	Leading Actor	This Is England '88	Richard "Woody" Woodford
2021	Won	RTS North West Awards	Best Performance in a Comedy	Brassic	Vincent "Vinnie" O'Neill
2021	Nominated	BAFTA Television Awards	Male Performance in a Comedy Programme	Brassic	Vincent "Vinnie" O'Neill
2022	Nominated	BAFTA Television Awards	Male Performance in a Comedy Programme	Brassic	Vincent "Vinnie" O'Neill
2023	Nominated	BAFTA Television Awards	Male Performance in a Comedy Programme	Brassic	Vincent "Vinnie" O'Neill
2024	Nominated	BAFTA Television Awards	Male Performance in a Comedy Programme	Brassic	Vincent "Vinnie" O'Neill
