= Perry Fitzpatrick =

British actor

- Born: Nottingham, England
- Occupation: Actor
- Years active: 2000–present

Perry Fitzpatrick is an English actor. He is known for his roles as DS Chris Lomax in the BBC series Line of Duty, Flip in This Is England '86 and This Is England '90, and Hot & Cold in Drifters.

== Early life ==
Fitzpatrick attended the Central Junior Television Workshop when he was 11. Whilst there, Fitzpatrick befriended Vicky McClure, with whom he later worked on This Is England '86, This Is England '90, I Am Nicola, the sixth series of Line of Duty and Without Sin.

== Career ==
In 2022, Fitzpatrick featured in crime drama Sherwood, alongside Lesley Manville and David Morrissey, and Hullraisers. In December 2022, Fitzpatrick once again starred alongside McClure, playing the latter's ex-husband in the ITV psychological thriller, Without Sin.

== Filmography ==
=== Film ===
Year	Film	Role	Notes
2002	Anita and Me	Ray	
2003	Crust	Steve Crump	
2009	Bale	Jed	Short film
2010	Dirty Egg	Egg	Short film
2010	Marcus		Short film
2011	The True Meaning of Love	Boom	
2011	Weekender	Chris	
2011	Papa	Toni	Short film
2011	Door Open		Short film
2012	The Other Side of Simon	Simon	Short film
2012	Alien Uprising	Neff	
2012	Eggbox	Jimmy	Television film
2014	The Spoiler	Freddie Darmoody	
2015	The Caravan	Donald	
2015	Dark_Net	Tony	Short film
2018	Killer Weekend	Cheese	
2018	Strangeways Here We Come	Marvin	
2018	All the Devil's Men	Logan	
2019	Roundheads and Cavaliers	Adrian	Short film
2019	Downton Abbey	Chris Webster	
2019	Fanny Lye Deliver'd	The Sheriff's Deputy	
2020	Surge	Bradley	
2023	The Apology	Farmer Tim	Short film

=== Television ===
Year	Title	Role	Notes
2000	Peak Practice	Paul	Episode: "Close to Home"
2000	Peak Practice	Jake McKenzie	Episode: "Keeping Up the Act"
2004	A Thing Called Love	Pete	Episode: "The Lost Child"
2010	This Is England '86	Flip	Miniseries; 3 episodes
2010	Little Crackers	Gerrard	Episode: "Julian Barratt's Little Cracker: Satan's Hoof"
2011	Trollied	Jamie	Episode: "Series 1, Episode 5"
2013	The Mill	William Greg	Episode: "Order in Court"
2013	Peaky Blinders	Guard	Episode: "Series 1, Episode 6"
2014	The Musketeers	Lambert	Episode: "The Challenge"
2015	Undercover	Barry	Episode: "Episode 1"
2015	This Is England '90	Flip	Miniseries; 3 episodes
2015	Crackanory	Glenn	Episode: "The Catchment Area & the Frogbeast of Pontfidd"
2015	Crackanory	Craig	Episode: "The Zombie That Roared & the Sat Nav Did It"
2015–2016	Drifters	Hot & Cold	Recurring role; 4 episodes
2016	Suspects	TDC Gary Roscoe	Series 5 regular; 6 episodes
2017	Murder in Successville	Phil Neville	Episode: "A Murder in Ye Olde Successville"
2017–2025	Man Like Mobeen	Officer Harper	Recurring role; 16 episodes
2019	I Am...	Adam	Episode: "I Am Nicola"
2020	We Hunt Together	Johnny	Recurring role; 3 episodes
2020	Cursed	Bu'Luf	Recurring role; 2 episodes
2021	Line of Duty	DS Chris Lomax	Recurring role; 7 episodes
2022	Without Sin	Paul	Miniseries; 3 episodes
2022–2023	Hullraisers	Craig	Series regular; 12 episodes
2022–	Sherwood	Rory Sparrow	Series regular; 12 episodes
2024	Daddy Issues	Tyrone	Episode: "Garden Sliders"
