= Stephen Graham =

English actor (born 1973)

Stephen Graham OBE
- Graham in 2026
- Born: 3 August 1973 (age 53); Kirkby, Lancashire, England
- Education: Ruffwood School; Rose Bruford College
- Occupations: Actor; producer; screenwriter
- Years active: 1990–present
- Spouse: Hannah Walters (m. 2008)
- Children: 2

Stephen Joseph Graham (born 3 August 1973) is an English actor, producer, and screenwriter. He has received nominations for seven British Academy Television Awards (winning one) and one British Academy Film Award. He has also won three Primetime Emmy Awards, one Golden Globe Award and two Actor Awards, among other accolades.

Graham began his career in 1990, with early notable roles in Snatch (2000) and Gangs of New York (2002), before his breakthrough role as Andrew "Combo" Gascoigne in the film This Is England (2006). His film appearances include Tinker Tailor Soldier Spy (2011), Pirates of the Caribbean: On Stranger Tides (2011) and Pirates of the Caribbean: Dead Men Tell No Tales (2017), Rocketman (2019), The Irishman (2019), Boiling Point (2021) and its sequel television series (2023), and Venom: Let There Be Carnage (2021) and its sequel Venom: The Last Dance (2024).

On television, Graham reprised his role as Combo in This Is England '86, This Is England '88, and This Is England '90. He also starred in the drama Little Boy Blue; the fifth series of Line of Duty; HBO series Boardwalk Empire; BBC drama Time; and the sixth series of Peaky Blinders. He created, co-wrote and served as an executive producer for the miniseries Adolescence (2025) on Netflix, in which he also acted, and won the awards for Lead Actor, Writer and Executive Producer for a Limited or Anthology Series at the 77th Primetime Emmy Awards. He also starred in A Thousand Blows (2025), created by Steven Knight.

In 2020, Graham co-founded the production company Matriarch Productions with his wife and fellow actor, Hannah Walters. For services to drama, Graham was appointed Officer of the Order of the British Empire (OBE) in the 2023 New Year Honours.

== Early life and education ==
Stephen Graham was born on 3 August 1973 in Kirkby, Lancashire, (Note: Lancashire is where Kirkby was at the time of Graham's birth. Since 1 April 1974, Kirkby has been in Merseyside.) to parents who spanned racial and national lines. He was raised by his mother, a white English social worker, and his stepfather, a mechanic who later became a pediatric nurse. Graham maintained a good relationship with his biological father. Graham's father was of dual heritage: his mother was Swedish and his father was Jamaican. Graham has discussed his experience being a light-skinned multiracial person in the UK. His brothers have skin that is much darker than his. Graham's stepfather also has African heritage, and he helped Graham accept this side of himself.

Graham attended Overdale Primary School in Kirkby, where he was encouraged to pursue an acting career at the age of eight by local actor Andrew Schofield, who lived across the road from him and went to see him perform as Jim Hawkins in a school production of Treasure Island. He then continued his education at Ruffwood School. Aged 14, he was introduced to Liverpool's Everyman Theatre, and he travelled to a range of locations to perform, including at the Edinburgh Festival. He was part of a breakdancing crew called the Bronx Breakers.

After his brother Nathan was born, Graham went to train at the Rose Bruford College of Theatre & Performance in Bexley, London. There he met actor, and future wife and collaborator, Hannah Walters. He then moved to Plumstead in South East London. He began learning about acting and was introduced to the work of Stanislavski and Uta Hagen.

== Career ==
Graham has played notable roles across both film and television. Graham has often portrayed characters from different parts of Britain, Ireland, and America, receiving praise for his accent work.

In November 2019, Graham was the guest for BBC Radio 4's Desert Island Discs. He said he loves improvisation.

Graham is currently represented by Jan Epstein at Independent Talent Group (UK); ICM Partners and Link Entertainment (US).

=== Beginnings (1990–2006) ===
Graham began his career in 1990, with early notable roles including Tommy in Snatch (2000), Myron "Mike" Ranney in Band of Brothers (2001), and Shang in Gangs of New York (2002).

==== This is England film (2006) and series (2010–2015) ====
Graham's breakout role was playing Andrew "Combo" Gascoigne in Shane Meadow's film This Is England (2006). He received a nomination for a British Independent Film Award for the role. He reprised his role as Combo on television in This Is England '86 (2010), This Is England '88 (2011), and This Is England '90 (2015).

=== Television ===
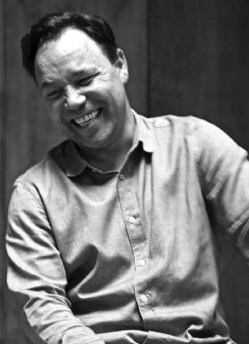
Graham in 2013

Graham has starred in further television roles including: as Det. Supt. Dave Kelly in the 2017 drama Little Boy Blue; John Corbett in the fifth series of Line of Duty (2019); Al Capone in the HBO series Boardwalk Empire (2010–2014); Eric McNally in the BBC drama Time (2021); and Hayden Stagg in the sixth series of Peaky Blinders (2022).

In 2011, Graham starred in the BBC Christmas show Lapland. When the series was remade as Being Eileen, Graham's role was recast with Dean Andrews.

In 2019, Graham featured as DS John Corbett in series 5 of the BBC drama Line of Duty.

In January 2020, he appeared in the ITV series White House Farm as Welsh detective "Taff" Jones. Despite his reputation for his ability to adopt different accents, a number of critics criticised his performance and stated that his Welsh accent was inauthentic.

=== Film ===
Graham appeared as the Scrum in the 2011 film Pirates of the Caribbean: On Stranger Tides, a role he reprised in the 2017 film Pirates of the Caribbean: Dead Men Tell No Tales, starring alongside his wife, Hannah Walters.

Other film roles include Anthony Provenzano in The Irishman (2019) and Patrick Mulligan in Venom: Let There Be Carnage (2021) and its sequel Venom: The Last Dance (2024).

=== Music videos ===
Graham has appeared in several music videos, including those for:

- "I Remember" by Deadmau5 and Kaskade
- "Fluorescent Adolescent" and "When the Sun Goes Down" by Arctic Monkeys
- "Unlovable" by Babybird (directed by Johnny Depp)
- Gazelle's single "Finger on the Trigger"
- "Soul Vampire" by Macclesfield-based neo-psychedelic band the Virginmarys
- "Turn" by Travis
- Kasabian's video "You're in Love with a Psycho"
- Goldie's "I Adore You" (2017), as an inmate within the open prison system
- Sam Fender's "Spit of You", in which he plays Fender's father. This was also produced by his production company Matriarch Productions.

He also appeared in "CODnapped", a promotional video for a DLC of the video game Call of Duty: Ghosts.

=== Matriarch Productions ===
In 2020 he co-founded the production company Matriarch Productions with his wife, Hannah Walters. In 2026, Disney+ signed a first-look deal with the company.

==== Boiling Point (2019–2023) ====
In 2021, he played Andy Jones, a troubled chef, alongside his wife Hannah Walters in the film Boiling Point, directed by his Band of Brothers co-star Philip Barantini. A one-shot film set in a restaurant kitchen, the film was expanded from the 2019 short film Boiling Point. The film depicts a stressful night in a restaurant, where Graham's character covertly drinks and takes drugs until he collapses at the end of the film, in what appears to be a heart attack. Graham was nominated for a BAFTA for the feature film.

In October 2022, it was announced that Graham would reprise his role in a BBC One series airing in 2023 as a sequel to the film, also named Boiling Point. The series picks up six months after the film, where Andy's sous chef Carly is now head chef of her own restaurant, with many of Andy's original team. The Guardian said of the series that "it is a shame that Andy is a smaller part of this story, because it means that when the magnificent Graham does appear on-screen, you realise just how good he is."

==== Adolescence (2025) ====
In 2025, Graham created, co-wrote and served as an executive producer for the miniseries Adolescence on Netflix, in which he also acted. Graham plays Eddie Miller, father of 13-year-old Jamie (Owen Cooper), who is accused of murdering a young girl.

The series was widely praised by critics and won all three awards for Lead Actor, Writer and Executive Producer for a Limited or Anthology Series at the 77th Primetime Emmy Awards.

The series also started national conversations around violence, incel culture and online safety. Co-writer of the show Jack Thorne attended Downing Street to talk with Prime Minister Keir Starmer and culture secretary Lisa Nandy. Graham and Thorne also accepted an invite to a parliamentary meeting on the subject of online safety by Labour MP Josh MacAlister. The series has been made available free of charge for schools to use as a learning tool.

==== A Thousand Blows (2025–2026) ====
Graham also appeared in the British historical drama series A Thousand Blows.

== Recognition ==
Graham was appointed Officer of the Order of the British Empire (OBE) in the 2023 New Year Honours for services to drama, which he dedicated to his mother, who died in 2022.

Graham was nominated for an RTS Award for his work in The Street and for a British Independent Film Award for his work in This Is England. He has received nominations for five British Academy Television Awards and two British Academy Film Awards.

== Personal life ==
Graham met actress and producer Hannah Walters while both were training as actors at Rose Bruford College. After a five-year friendship, they started a relationship. They married in 2008. They live in Ibstock, Leicestershire, having previously lived in Beckenham, London. Together they have a son and a daughter.

Graham has dyslexia, explaining in 2019 that Walters reads scripts for him and helps him decide whether to accept a role.

Graham has shared openly that he struggled with depression, revealing that he once tried to hang himself in his early 20s but survived because the rope snapped. He had a breakdown when he first moved away from home; he said this was because of trauma he had not dealt with, including his grandmother's death when he was 14 and his mother's stillbirth of a baby brother when he was 17.

He is teetotal. Graham and Walters have backed a new three-year arts programme that aims to support the mental health and well-being of disadvantaged young people in Leicester.

Graham is a lifelong fan of Liverpool F.C. and has made several appearances on Sky Sports's Soccer AM. In December 2024, he faced an FA investigation after verbally abusing a referee at a non-league football match.

== Filmography ==
Key
†	Denotes works that have not yet been released

=== Film ===
Year	Title	Role	Notes	Ref.
1990	Dancin' Thru the Dark	Football Kid		
1991	Blonde Fist	Son		
1997	Downtime	Jacko		
1998	Joint Venture			
2000	Snatch	Tommy		
2001	Blow Dry	Photographer		
2001	The Last Minute	DJ Banana		
2002	Revengers Tragedy	Officer		
2002	Gangs of New York	Shang		
2003	American Cousins	Henry		
2003	Without You	Billy	Short film	
2004	The I Inside	Travis		
2005	Pit Fighter	Harry		
2005	Goal!	Des		
2006	Scummy Man	George	Short film	
2006	This Is England	Andrew "Combo" Gascoigne		
2007	The Good Night	Victor		
2008	Filth and Wisdom	Harry Beecham		
2008	The Crew	Franner		
2008	Inkheart	Fulvio		
2009	The Devil's Wedding	The Hotelier	Short film	
2009	Awaydays	Godden		
2009	The Damned United	Billy Bremner		
2009	Doghouse	Vince		
2009	Public Enemies	Baby Face Nelson		
2010	London Boulevard	Danny		
2011	Season of the Witch	Hagamar		
2011	Pirates of the Caribbean: On Stranger Tides	Scrum		
2011	Texas Killing Fields	Rhino		
2011	Tinker Tailor Soldier Spy	Jerry Westerby		
2011	Being Eileen	Pete Lewis		
2012	Best Laid Plans	Danny		
2012	Blood	Chrissie Fairburn		
2014	Get Santa	Barber		
2014	Hyena	David Knight		
2015	A Patch of Fog	Robert Green		
2015	Orthodox	Benjamin	Also executive producer	
2017	Pirates of the Caribbean: Dead Men Tell No Tales	Scrum		
2017	Film Stars Don't Die in Liverpool	Joe Turner Jr.		
2017	Journey's End	Trotter		
2017	Funny Cow	Mike		
2017	Being Keegan	Jay	Short film	
2017	The Man with the Iron Heart	Heinrich Himmler		
2018	Yardie	Rico		
2018	Walk like a Panther	Mark Bolton		
2019	Hellboy	Gruagach (Voice)		
2019	Rocketman	Dick James		
2019	The Irishman	Anthony "Tony Pro" Provenzano		
2019	Boiling Point	Chef	Short film	
2019	Pop	Pop		
2020	Greyhound	Lieutenant Commander Charlie Cole		
2021	Venom: Let There Be Carnage	Patrick Mulligan		
2021	Boiling Point	Andy Jones		
2022	Matilda the Musical	Mr Wormwood		
2024	Young Woman and the Sea	Bill Burgess		
2024	Buffalo Kids	Uncle Niall (Voice – English dub)		
2024	Modì, Three Days on the Wing of Madness	Léopold Zborowski		
2024	Venom: The Last Dance	Patrick Mulligan		
2024	Blitz	Albert		
2025	Good Boy	Chris		
2025	Springsteen: Deliver Me from Nowhere	Douglas Springsteen		
2026	Animol	Claypole		
2026	Peaky Blinders: The Immortal Man	Hayden Stagg		
2026	Bunker	Toby		
2027	Greyhound 2 †	Lieutenant Commander Charlie Cole	Post-production	
2027	Ibelin	Robert Steen	Post-production	

=== Television ===
Year	Title	Role	Notes	Ref.
1990	Children's Ward	Mickey Bell	2 episodes	
1993	Heartbeat	Barry Ward	Episode: "Riders of the Storm"	
1996	Devil's Food	WPKV News Director	Television film	
1997	The Lakes	Graham	Episode #1.1	
1998	Brothers and Sisters	Andrew		
1998	Where the Heart Is	Nick Bowen	Episode: "Darkness Follows"	
1998	Liverpool 1	Thewlis	2 episodes	
1998	The Jump	Peter McNulty	2 episodes	
1998–2002	The Bill	Jezzo / Jason Barrett	3 episodes	
1999	Coronation Street	Lee Sankey	5 episodes	
2000	Forgive and Forget	John	Television film	
2001	Band of Brothers	Sgt. Myron "Mike" Ranney	2 episodes	
2002	Flesh and Blood	Eddie	Television film	
2004	Top Buzzer	Lee	10 episodes	
2005	Murder Investigation Team	Jason Phelps	Episode 2.3	
2005	Last Rights	Steve	Miniseries	
2005	Empire	Bazzer	Miniseries	
2006–2007	The Innocence Project	Andrew Lucas	6 episodes	
2008	The Passion	Barabbas	3 episodes	
2008	Occupation	Danny Ferguson	3 episodes	
2008	The Street	Shay Ryan	2 episodes	
2010	This Is England '86	Andrew "Combo" Gascoigne	2 episodes	
2010–2014	Boardwalk Empire	Al Capone	36 episodes	
2011	This Is England '88	Andrew "Combo" Gascoigne	2 episodes	
2011	Walk like a Panther	Mark Bolton	Episode 1.1	
2012	Accused	Tony	Episode: "Tracie's Story"	
2012	Parade's End	Vincent Macmaster	5 episodes	
2012	Good Cop	Noel Finch	1 episode	
2013	Playhouse Presents	Len	Episode: "The Call Out"	
2015	This Is England '90	Andrew "Combo" Gascoigne	3 episodes	
2016	The Secret Agent	Chief Inspector Heat	3 episodes	
2016	The Watchman	Carl	Television film	
2017	Decline and Fall	Philbrick	3 episodes	
2017	Taboo	Atticus	8 episodes	
2017	Little Boy Blue	Detective Superintendent Dave Kelly	4 episodes	
2018	Action Team	Gavril	Episode: "Mind Games"	
2018–2020	Save Me	Fabio "Melon" Melonzola	Main role	
2019	Line of Duty	John Corbett	Series 5	
2019	The Virtues	Joseph	4 episodes	
2019	A Christmas Carol	Jacob Marley	Miniseries	
2020	White House Farm	DCI Taff Jones	6 episodes	
2020–2022	Code 404	DI Roy Carver	Main role	
2021	Time	Eric McNally	Series 1; main role	
2021	The North Water	Captain Brownlee	Miniseries	
2021	Help	Tony	Television film	
2022	Peaky Blinders	Hayden Stagg	Series 6; 2 episodes	
2022	The Walk-In	Matthew Collins	Main role	
2023	Boiling Point	Andy Jones	Miniseries	
2023	Bodies	Elias Mannix	Miniseries	
2025	Adolescence	Eddie Miller	Also co-creator, co-writer, and executive producer	
2025–2026	A Thousand Blows	Sugar Goodson	Also executive producer	
2026	Nocturne	Jurek Walter		

=== Music videos ===
Year	Title	Artist	Ref.
1999	"Turn"	Travis	
2006	"When the Sun Goes Down"	Arctic Monkeys	
2007	"Fluorescent Adolescent"	Arctic Monkeys	
2008	"I Remember"	Deadmau5 ft. Kaskade	
2008	"Soul Vampire"	The Virginmarys	
2010	"Unloveable"	Babybird	
2017	"You're in Love with a Psycho"	Kasabian	
2017	"I Adore You"	Goldie	
2019	"Wandering Star"	Noel Gallagher's High Flying Birds	
2021	"Spit of You"	Sam Fender	
2026	"Hold me in the Dark"	Myles Smith	

== Awards and nominations ==
Year	Award	Category	Work	Result	Ref.
2006	British Independent Film Award	Best Supporting Actor	This Is England	Nominated	
2010	RTS Awards	Best Actor	The Street	Nominated	
2010	Screen Actors Guild Award	Outstanding Performance by an Ensemble in a Drama Series	Boardwalk Empire	Won	
2011	Screen Actors Guild Award	Outstanding Performance by an Ensemble in a Drama Series	Boardwalk Empire	Won	
2013	British Academy Television Awards	Best Supporting Actor	Accused (Tracie's Story)	Nominated	
2013	Screen Actors Guild Award	Outstanding Performance by an Ensemble in a Drama Series	Boardwalk Empire	Nominated	
2014	Screen Actors Guild Award	Outstanding Performance by an Ensemble in a Drama Series	Boardwalk Empire	Nominated	
2016	British Academy Television Awards	Best Actor	This Is England '90	Nominated	
2018	RTS Awards	Best Actor	Little Boy Blue	Won	
2018	International Film Festival of Wales	Best Actor	Being Keegan	Won	
2019	British Academy Television Awards	Best Supporting Actor	Save Me	Nominated	
2019	Screen Actors Guild Award	Outstanding Performance by a Cast in a Motion Picture	The Irishman	Nominated	
2018	RTS Awards	Best Actor	The Virtues	Won	
2020	British Academy Television Awards	Best Actor	The Virtues	Nominated	
2022	British Academy Film Awards	Best Actor in a Leading Role	Boiling Point	Nominated	
2022	British Independent Film Award	Best Actor	Boiling Point	Nominated	
2022	British Academy Television Awards	Best Single Drama (as producer)	Help	Nominated	
2022	British Academy Television Awards	Best Actor	Help	Nominated	
2022	British Academy Television Awards	Best Supporting Actor	Time	Nominated	
2022	Broadcasting Press Guild Awards	Best Actor	Help / Time	Won	
2022	Seoul International Drama Awards	Best Actor	Help	Won	
2025	Primetime Emmy Awards	Outstanding Limited or Anthology Series	Adolescence	Won	
2025	Primetime Emmy Awards	Outstanding Lead Actor in a Limited or Anthology Series or Movie	Adolescence	Won	
2025	Primetime Emmy Awards	Outstanding Writing for a Limited or Anthology Series or Movie	Adolescence	Won	
2025	Seoul International Drama Awards	Best Screenwriter	Adolescence	Nominated	
2025	Golden Globe Awards	Best Actor – Miniseries or Television Film	Adolescence	Won	
2026	British Academy Television Awards	Best Actor	Adolescence	Won	
2026	British Academy Television Craft Awards	Best Writer: Drama	Adolescence	Nominated	
