= Michael Socha =

English actor (born 1987)

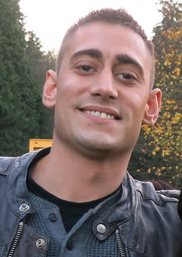
- Socha in 2014
- Born: Michael Robert Socha; 1987 (age 38–39); Littleover, Derby, Derbyshire, England
- Occupation: Actor
- Years active: 2006–present
- Children: 1
- Relatives: Lauren Socha (sister)

Michael Socha (born 1987) is an English actor. He is known for his roles in the films This Is England and Summer, and the television series This Is England '86 and its sequels. He also appeared in Being Human, Once Upon a Time in Wonderland, and the second series of the BBC One drama Showtrial.

== Early life and education ==
Michael Socha was born in 1987 in Derby, Derbyshire, England, to Kathleen Lyons ("Kath") and Robert Socha.

Socha was brought up in Littleover, a suburb of Derby, though for his secondary education he attended St Benedict Catholic School in the Darley Abbey area of the city. Socha was a rebellious pupil who often skipped school. When he was 12, his mother read about a play being cast by the Chellaston Youth Players. She asked her son and daughter if they wanted to try out for it, and both did. Socha's motivation for auditioning was his anger at being denied a role in a school musical and his desire to prove his teachers wrong about his acting skills. He won the lead role of Bugsy Malone in the play. He acted in several plays for the group, but did not take acting very seriously.

Through teachers at Socha's school the family learned about the Central Junior Television Workshop, a free actors' workshop for young people from the Nottingham area. He enrolled in the course when he was 14, but was almost refused admission as he had failed to learn the monologue for his audition and was put in the "reserve group". His second audition went the same way, but the programme relented and allowed him in after a time. Socha says the workshop had a strong impact on him, and he began working hard at acting. His first professional role came when he was cast in a small part in a short film. He was quickly cast in several small parts subsequently, and hired an agent.

Socha's father had a long history of alcohol abuse, and his parents separated. In 2004, Robert Socha died of an alcohol-related heart attack. According to Kathleen, the death of his father made her son very independent.

Socha liked drama, English, and history courses, however, and received his GCSEs in those three subjects. He credits his teacher, Mrs Urquhart-Hughes, as someone who watched over him and motivated him.

His first job after leaving school was in a factory. He disliked it and quit, and enrolled at Burton & South Derbyshire College, a further education college. He worked at two other factories after leaving school, as well as at a car wash. He also worked as a labourer for his uncle's bricklaying firm, mixing mortar for the bricklayers, but as he was constantly taking time off work at the last moment to attend auditions he quit working full-time and dedicated himself to acting.

== Career ==
Socha's breakthrough role came early in his acting career. In 2006, he was cast as school bully Harvey in Shane Meadows's skinhead subculture film, This Is England.

In 2008, he was cast in Kenneth Glenaan's BAFTA Scotland-award winning film Summer, where he acted opposite Robert Carlyle. The same year, he appeared in Duane Hopkins's film Better Things and the independent small-budget comedy Dogging: A Love Story. He also appeared in three episodes of the BBC One medical drama Casualty. In February 2009, Socha made his stage debut at Nottingham Playhouse in Glamour, a comedy by Stephen Lowe. The same year, he appeared in an episode of the science fiction police drama Paradox on BBC One and in the made-for-television film The Unloved for Channel 4.

Despite his initial success, Socha was "penniless" and "waiting for work" for much of 2009 and early 2010, sitting at home and watching daytime television. His next big break came when Shane Meadows asked him to reprise the role of Harvey the bully for a four-part television series for Channel 4. The series, This Is England '86, follows the lives of the film's characters three years after the events originally depicted. It aired in September 2010. That same year, Socha appeared in an episode of the television comedy Married Single Other as well as the film Bonded by Blood. He also appeared in the This Is England Christmas special, and in a music video with American soul music singer Lauren Pritchard. In 2011, he played William Price in Helen Edmundson's adaptation of Anna of the Five Towns on BBC Radio 4.

Socha appeared in BBC Three's hit supernatural series Being Human in 2011, receiving good critical notice as the innocent young werewolf Tom McNair. He almost did not appear on the show. He missed his audition after a taxicab hit him and fled the scene while he was helping a friend move furniture across a road in Normanton. Although only bruised, he missed his audition and had to plead for a second chance. He won the role of Tom, a young werewolf who has been brought up in the wild by his father and taught to hunt vampires. During his time on Being Human, Socha says he became good friends with Russell Tovey and co-star Robson Green. Socha has admitted that he can get carried away while performing some of his more physically demanding scenes. On another occasion, acting out a werewolf transformation in a metal cage, he almost injured himself after his physical acting became too extreme. He has received at least seven minor injuries requiring medical treatment and reporting to authorities.

Socha was upgraded from a recurring role to the main cast for the fourth series of Being Human, after the previous main cast, including Tovey, left the show. The fourth series started airing in February 2012. He also appeared in the music video to the Jake Bugg song "Seen It All" and in the music video to the Lauren Pritchard song "Stuck".

In 2013, Socha portrayed the Knave of Hearts in Once Upon a Time in Wonderland, a spin-off to the ABC fantasy series Once Upon a Time. He also starred in Chris Coghill's film Spike Island, based upon The Stone Roses gig of the same name. After Once Upon a Time in Wonderland's cancellation, it was confirmed that Socha would be a main cast member in the fourth season of Once Upon a Time.

He also starred in the film Svengali in which he played a guitarist in a band and in the film Twenty8k in which he played a drug dealer.

2016 saw Socha take the lead in the E4 series The Aliens.

In 2017, Socha starred in Double Date and a remake of the 1973 film Papillon, as well as playing King Richard III in the music video titled 'ill Ray (the king)' by British Indie rock group Kasabian.

In 2018, he played Bill Twist, the St Helens Town F.C. captain, in the film The Keeper, a biographical story of the footballing life of Bert Trautmann.

In August 2019, Socha played the main cast in the music videos titled “something about you” - which was written by Elderbrook and Rudimental. In which he played a member of a therapy group, which highlights struggles between males and showing the other side of masculinity to one another.

In 2021, the BBC announced that Socha had been cast as "King" David Hartley, leader of the Cragg Vale Coiners, in Shane Meadows' period drama, The Gallows Pole.

== Personal life ==
Socha has a son with former partner Faye. They split sometime before 2016.

== Filmography ==
=== Film ===
Year	Title	Role	Notes
2006	This is England	Bully (Harvey)	
2006	Soft	ASBO	Short films
2007	Lady Margaret	Danny	Short films
2008	Better Things	Mike	
2008	Summer	Daniel	
2009	Public Sex	Jim	Original title: Dogging: A Love Story
2009	Jade	Stephen	Short films
2009	Bale	Kyle	Short films
2010	Cut	Jimmy / Food Dude	
2010	Shank	Craze	
2010	Bonded by Blood	Donny Svenson	
2010	Labour	Henry	Short films
2010	The Good Men of Leicester	Simon	Short films
2011	Hit and Run	Michael	Short films
2012	Twenty8k	Tony Marchetto	
2012	Spike Island	Carl	
2013	Svengali	Tommy	
2017	Double Date	Alex	
2017	Papillon	Julot	
2018	Walk Like a Panther	Ricky Rickson	
2018	The Keeper	Bill Twist	
2019	Break Clause	Nick	
2019	Killers Anonymous	Leandro	
2019	A Guide to Second Date Sex	Dan	
2020	Edicius	Jason	Short film
2020	As Dead as It Gets	Lee	
2020	Big Boys Don't Cry	Paul 'Jacko' Connolly	
2021	Creation Stories	Joe Foster	
2022	Tales of the Creeping Death	Goose	
2022	The Other Me	Giorgi	
2022	Pram Snatcher	Transit Man	Short film
2023	Jericho Ridge	Earl Macready	
2023	Distressing Images	Ed Collier	Short film
2026	Preschool	Brian	
2026	500 Miles †	TBA	Post-production
TBA	Go Away! †	Kyle Burden	Post-production

=== Television ===
Year	Title	Role	Notes
2008–2009	Casualty	Ryan Malone	Series 23; 6 episodes
2009	The Unloved	Michael	Television films
2009	Harvest	Yebsley	Television films
2009	Paradox	Zac Henley	Miniseries; Episode 5
2010	Married Single Other	Spud	Episode 3: "Burning Rubber"
2010	Dive	Alex	2-part television film
2010	This Is England '86	Harvey	Miniseries; Episodes 1–4
2011	This Is England '88	Harvey	Miniseries; Episodes 1–3
2011–2013	Being Human	Tom McNair	Series 3–5; 18 episodes
2012	Homefront	Rob	Episodes 2–4
2013–2014	Once Upon a Time in Wonderland	The Knave of Hearts / Will Scarlet	Regular role. Episodes 1–13
2014	Silent Witness	David Bennetto	Series 17; Episodes 3 & 4: "Coup de Grace": Parts 1 & 2
2014	Inspector George Gently	Joe Turner	Series 6; Episode 4: "Gently Going Under"
2014	Our World War	Private Andy Andrews	Miniseries; Episode 2: "Pals"
2014–2015	Once Upon a Time	Will Scarlet	Regular role. Series 4; Episodes 1–23
2015	This Is England '90	Harvey	Miniseries; Episodes 1–4
2016	The Aliens	Lewis Garvey	Miniseries; Episodes 1–6
2017	Electric Dreams	Noah	Episode 4: "Crazy Diamond"
2018	Down the Caravan	Gerwyn	Television film
2019	Chernobyl	Mikhail	Miniseries; Episodes 1, 2 & 5
2020	Adulting	(unknown)	Television film
2020	On the Edge	Olly	Miniseries; Series 2; Episode 2: "For You"
2021	Time	Kenny Meadows	Series 1; Episode 2
2022	Skint	Jambo	Episode 2: "No Grasses No Nonces"
2023	The Gallows Pole	'King' David Hartley	Main role. Episodes 1–3
2023	Changing Ends	Adam	Episode 4: "Stud"
2024	DI Ray	Dave Chapman	Series 2; Episodes 1–6
2024	Showtrial	PC Justin Mitchell	Main role. Series 2; Episodes 1–5
2025	Toxic Town	Peter	Miniseries; Episodes 1-4
2025	What It Feels Like for a Girl	Steve	7 episodes
2026	The Cage	Matty	
2026	The Witch Farm	Bill	
TBA	Deadpoint	Fairweather	Filming

=== Stage ===
Year	Title	Character	Venue
2009	Glamour	Jimmy	Nottingham Playhouse
2016	This Is Living	Michael	Trafalgar Studios

=== Radio ===
Year	Title	Character	Broadcast On	Notes
2011	Anna of the Five Towns	William Price	BBC Radio 4	Adaptation by Helen Edmundson
2016	Northern Lights	Tom	BBC Radio 4	

=== Music video ===
Year	Title	Artist
2011	"Stuck"	Lauren Pritchard
2012	"Bad Lad"	Thee Deadtime Philharmonic
2013	"Seen It All"	Jake Bugg
2017	"Ill Ray (The King)"	Kasabian
2019	"Something About You"	Elderbrook & Rudimental
