= Rosamund Hanson =

English actress (born 1989)

- Born: Rosamund Abigail Hanson; 24 September 1989 (age 36); Nottingham, Nottinghamshire, England
- Occupations: Actress; model; comedian
- Known for: "Smell" in This is England and Cheryl in Life's Too Short

Rosamund Abigail Hanson (born 24 September 1989) is an English film and television actress and comedian who played the role of Michelle ("Smell") in the 2006 film This Is England and its television sequels This Is England '86, This Is England '88 and This Is England '90. In 2011 she appeared in British television series Shameless where she played the role of Bonnie Tyler.

== Career ==
Hanson decided she wanted to be an actress after landing a role in a school play as Kaa in The Jungle Book. A few years later she began acting with the Central Junior Television Workshop and made her television debut in an episode of Dangerville in 2003. Three years later she landed the role of Smell in Shane Meadows' coming-of-age drama film This Is England (2006). In 2008 she appeared in the television series Fresh!, playing the role of Alison. She continued to play this role in the 2009 spin-off series titled Off the Hook.

In 2010, Hanson reprised her role of Smell in the television sequel This Is England '86, appearing in all four episodes in the series. She reprised the role also in the two sequel series in 2011 and 2015.

In 2011, Hanson appeared in Ricky Gervais and Stephen Merchant's mockumentary sitcom Life's Too Short playing Cheryl, Warwick Davis's secretary. Also in 2011, she appeared in three episodes of Shameless as Bonnie Tyler.

She has cited Juliette Lewis as an inspiration on her acting.

== Filmography ==
Year	Appearance	Role	Notes
2003	Dangerville	Cyped	
2006	This Is England	Michelle "Smell"	
2008	Fresh!	Alison	TV series
2009	Off the Hook	Alison	TV series
2010	Coming of Age	Cinema Clerk 2010	TV series
2010	This Is England '86	Michelle "Smell"	TV series (4 episodes); Continued from the 2006 film of the same name
2011	Shameless	Bonnie Tyler	TV series (3 episodes)
2011	Life's Too Short	Cheryl	TV series
2011	This Is England '88	Michelle "Smell"	TV series Continued from the 2006 film of the same name and the 2010 television series of the same name.
2012	Switch	Lucy	TV series
2013	We Are the Freaks	Clare	
2014	Benny & Jolene	Nadia	
2014	Vodka Diaries	Alex	TV series
2015	This Is England '90	Michelle "Smell"	TV series Continued from the 2006 film of the same name and the 2010 and 2011 television series of the same name.
