= Thomas Turgoose =

English actor (born 1992)

- Born: Thomas Aiden Turgoose; 11 February 1992 (age 34); Grimsby, Humberside, England
- Occupation: Actor
- Years active: 2006–present
- Spouse: Charlotte Revell (m. 2018)

Thomas Aiden Turgoose (born 11 February 1992) is an English actor, best known for his role as Shaun Fields in the film This Is England (2006), a role he reprises in the This Is England mini TV series trilogy This Is England '86 (2010), This Is England '88 (2011) and This Is England '90 (2015).

== Career ==
In his first film role in 2006, he played the lead character, Shaun Fields, in This Is England, written and directed by Shane Meadows. On television he played the character Dizzy, a young boy mentored by Adam Solomons (Luke Treadaway), in the 2006 BBC drama series The Innocence Project. The programme was cancelled after eight episodes due to poor ratings and negative reviews. Turgoose's character was in six of the eight episodes. In 2008, he was again in a Meadows film, Somers Town, where he co-starred in a comedy role with young Polish actor Piotr Jagiello. Both young actors shared the "Best Actor in a Narrative Feature" award at New York's Tribeca Festival. He was also in The Scouting Book for Boys, and appeared in This Is England '86, a 4-part TV series for Channel 4 looking at characters from This is England three years on. A year later, he appeared in the three-part series This Is England '88, aired just before Christmas 2011, and also appeared in This Is England '90, aired in 2015.

He appeared on Pointless Celebrities, where he was paired with fellow actor Vas Blackwood. On 7 November 2015, he made his second appearance on Pointless Celebrities, where he was paired with Tyger Drew-Honey. In 2017, Turgoose appeared in the season 7 premiere of the HBO series Game of Thrones as a Lannister soldier.

== Personal life ==
Turgoose is a supporter of Grimsby Town, although he admits that as a boy he supported Manchester United, and is a season ticket holder at his hometown club. Prior to Grimsby Town's Conference Premier play-off final against Bristol Rovers, he interviewed manager Paul Hurst, club captain Craig Disley and striker Lenell John-Lewis for Football Focus, which was aired on 16 May 2015.

== Filmography ==
=== Film ===
| Year | Title | Role | Notes |
|---|---|---|---|
| 2006 | This Is England | Shaun Fields | British Independent Film Award for Most Promising Newcomer; Nominated – ALFS Award for British Breakthrough – Acting; Nominated – Empire Award for Best Newcomer |
| 2008 | Somers Town | Tomo | London Film Critics Circle Award for Young British Performer of the Year (also for Eden Lake); Nominated – British Independent Film Award for Best Actor |
| 2008 | Eden Lake | Cooper | |
| 2009 | The Scouting Book for Boys | David | Nominated – ALFS Award for Young British Performer of the Year |
| 2014 | The Hatching | Caesar | |
| 2017 | Butterfly Kisses | Shrek | |
| 2017 | Kingsman: The Golden Circle | Liam | |
| 2018 | Terminal | Raymond | |
| 2018 | Swimming with Men | Tom | |
| 2019 | Avengement | Tune | |
| 2019 | Looted | Leo | |
| 2021 | Creation Stories | Dick Green | |
| 2023 | Jackdaw | Craig | |
| 2025 | Mickey 17 | Bazooka Soldier | |

=== Television ===
| Year | Title | Role | Notes |
|---|---|---|---|
| 2006–2007 | The Innocence Project | Dizzy | 4 episodes |
| 2009 | Cast Offs | Jake | Episode: "Will" |
| 2010 | This Is England '86 | Shaun Fields | 4 episodes |
| 2011 | This Is England '88 | Shaun Fields | 3 episodes |
| 2012 | Birdsong | Private Tipper | 2 episodes |
| 2012 | Coming Up | Lump | Episode: "Ben and Lump" |
| 2015 | This Is England '90 | Shaun Fields | 4 episodes |
| 2016 | Storage Hunters UK | Himself | Celebrity, Cambridge episode |
| 2017 | Game of Thrones | Geoff | Episode: "Dragonstone" |
| 2021 | Intergalactic | Drew | 8 episodes |
| 2023 | The Gallows Pole | William Hartley | Miniseries; 3 episodes |
| 2024 | All Town Aren't We | Himself | Football documentary series; 3 episodes |

== Appearances ==
| Year | Appearance | Role | Notes |
|---|---|---|---|
| 2007 | The Making of 'This is England' | Himself | TV documentary short |
| 2008 | Cinema 3 | Himself | TV series (1 episode: "29 November 2008) |
| 2009 | Celebrity Juice | Himself | 25 March 2009 |
| 2010 | Breakfast | Himself | TV series (1 episode: "18 March 2010") |
| 2012 | Vic & Bob's Lucky Sexy Winners | Himself | Comedy panel show |
| 2012 | Maxïmo Park – "Hips and Lips" | Himself | Video clip |
| 2015 | Celebrity Juice | Himself | 1 October 2015 |
| 2016 | Celebrity Mastermind | Himself | 9 January 2016 |
| 2022 | Red Rum Club - "Vanilla" | | Video Clip |

== Honours ==
- 2006 Won – British Independent Film Awards – "Most Promising Newcomer"
- 2008 Nominated – British Independent Film Awards – "Best Performance by an Actor in a British Independent Film"
- 2008 Won – Tribeca Film Festival, New York – "Best Actor in a Narrative Feature" (with Piotr Jagiello) for Somers Town
