= British Independent Film Award for Best British Independent Film =

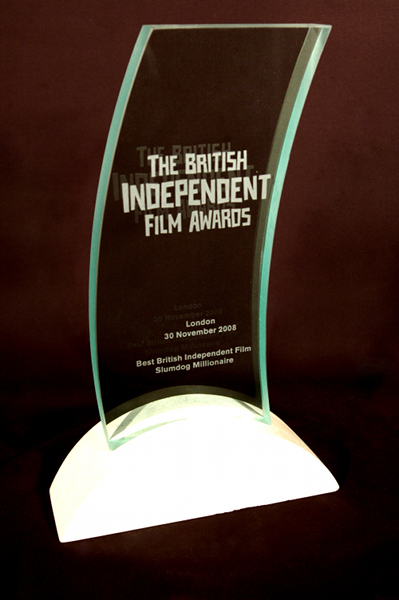
- 2008 BIFA trophy
- Awarded for: Best Film
- Country: United Kingdom
- Presented by: BIFA
- First award: 1998
- Currently held by: Pillion (2025)
- Website: www.bifa.org.uk

The British Independent Film Award for Best British Independent Film is an annual award given by the British Independent Film Awards (BIFA) to recognize the best British independent film. The award was first presented in the 1998 ceremony with Ken Loach's romantic drama My Name Is Joe being the first recipient of the award. The current winner is the romantic comedy-drama Pillion.

== Eligibility ==
The award goes to the writers, producers and directors that are fully credited for the film. Co-directors and co-writers are only eligible where there are no lead directors or writers credited. Other producer credits such as associate, executive, and others, as well as individuals credited with "additional material by", "original story by", and similar credits are not eligible for the award or nomination.

According to the rules presented by BIFA, in order for a film to be considered "independent" and therefore be eligible for this award and the other categories, the financing of the film must come from an independent studio or does not exceed a budget of $25 million in case of a production from a major studio. Additionally, the origination of the film will also be taken into account when assessing the independence of studio-backed films, this referring to "whether it was initially conceived inside or outside of a studio system".

Similarly to the craft categories, the nominees and winner for this award are decided by BIFA voters, unlike the performance categories and the debut awards which are decided by a performance jury and a filmmaker jury, respectively.

== Winners and nominees ==
=== 1990s ===
| Year | Film | Recipient(s) |
|---|---|---|
| 1998 (1st) | My Name Is Joe | Ken Loach |
| 1998 (1st) | Elizabeth | Shekhar Kapur |
| 1998 (1st) | Lock, Stock and Two Smoking Barrels | Guy Ritchie |
| 1998 (1st) | Nil by Mouth | Gary Oldman |
| 1998 (1st) | Twenty Four Seven | Shane Meadows |
| 1999 (2nd) | Wonderland | Michael Winterbottom |
| 1999 (2nd) | Gods and Monsters | Bill Condon |
| 1999 (2nd) | Hilary and Jackie | Anand Tucker |
| 1999 (2nd) | A Room for Romeo Brass | Shane Meadows |
| 1999 (2nd) | The War Zone | Tim Roth |

=== 2000s ===
| Year | Film | Recipient(s) |
|---|---|---|
| 2000 (3rd) | Billy Elliot | Stephen Daldry |
| 2000 (3rd) | One Day in September | Kevin Macdonald |
| 2000 (3rd) | Saving Grace | Nigel Cole |
| 2000 (3rd) | The House of Mirth | Terence Davies |
| 2000 (3rd) | The Last Resort | Paweł Pawlikowski |
| 2001 (4th) | Sexy Beast | Jonathan Glazer |
| 2001 (4th) | Bread and Roses | Ken Loach |
| 2001 (4th) | Jump Tomorrow | Joel Hopkins |
| 2001 (4th) | South West 9 | Richard Parry |
| 2001 (4th) | The Warrior | Asif Kapadia |
| 2002 (5th) | Sweet Sixteen | Ken Loach |
| 2002 (5th) | Bend It Like Beckham | Gurinder Chadha |
| 2002 (5th) | Bloody Sunday | Paul Greengrass |
| 2002 (5th) | Morvern Callar | Lynne Ramsay |
| 2002 (5th) | Lawless Heart | Tom Hunsinger and Neil Hunter |
| 2003 (6th) | Dirty Pretty Things | Stephen Frears |
| 2003 (6th) | 28 Days Later | Danny Boyle |
| 2003 (6th) | Buffalo Soldiers | Gregor Jordan |
| 2003 (6th) | The Magdalene Sisters | Peter Mullan |
| 2003 (6th) | Young Adam | David Mackenzie |
| 2004 (7th) | Vera Drake | Mike Leigh |
| 2004 (7th) | Dead Man's Shoes | Shane Meadows |
| 2004 (7th) | My Summer of Love | Paweł Pawlikowski |
| 2004 (7th) | Shaun of the Dead | Edgar Wright |
| 2004 (7th) | Touching the Void | Kevin Macdonald |
| 2005 (8th) | The Constant Gardener | Fernando Meirelles |
| 2005 (8th) | A Cock and Bull Story | Michael Winterbottom |
| 2005 (8th) | Mrs Henderson Presents | Stephen Frears |
| 2005 (8th) | The Descent | Neil Marshall |
| 2005 (8th) | The Libertine | Laurence Dunmore |
| 2006 (9th) | This Is England | Shane Meadows |
| 2006 (9th) | Red Road | Andrea Arnold |
| 2006 (9th) | The Last King of Scotland | Kevin Macdonald |
| 2006 (9th) | The Queen | Stephen Frears |
| 2006 (9th) | The Wind That Shakes the Barley | Ken Loach |
| 2007 (10th) | Control | Anton Corbijn |
| 2007 (10th) | And When Did You Last See Your Father? | Anand Tucker |
| 2007 (10th) | Eastern Promises | David Cronenberg |
| 2007 (10th) | Hallam Foe | David Mackenzie |
| 2007 (10th) | Notes on a Scandal | Richard Eyre |
| 2008 (11th) | Slumdog Millionaire | Danny Boyle |
| 2008 (11th) | Hunger | Steve McQueen |
| 2008 (11th) | In Bruges | Martin McDonagh |
| 2008 (11th) | Man on Wire | James Marsh |
| 2008 (11th) | Somers Town | Shane Meadows |
| 2009 (12th) | Moon | Duncan Jones |
| 2009 (12th) | An Education | Lone Scherfig |
| 2009 (12th) | Fish Tank | Andrea Arnold |
| 2009 (12th) | In the Loop | Armando Iannucci |
| 2009 (12th) | Nowhere Boy | Sam Taylor-Wood |

=== 2010s ===
| Year | Film | Recipient(s) |
|---|---|---|
| 2010 (13th) | The King's Speech | Tom Hooper |
| 2010 (13th) | Four Lions | Chris Morris |
| 2010 (13th) | Kick-Ass | Matthew Vaughn |
| 2010 (13th) | Monsters | Gareth Edwards |
| 2010 (13th) | Never Let Me Go | Mark Romanek |
| 2011 (14th) | Tyrannosaur | Paddy Considine |
| 2011 (14th) | Senna | Asif Kapadia |
| 2011 (14th) | Shame | Steve McQueen |
| 2011 (14th) | Tinker Tailor Soldier Spy | Tomas Alfredson |
| 2011 (14th) | We Need To Talk About Kevin | Lynne Ramsay |
| 2012 (15th) | Broken | Rufus Norris |
| 2012 (15th) | The Best Exotic Marigold Hotel | John Madden |
| 2012 (15th) | The Imposter | Bart Layton |
| 2012 (15th) | Sightseers | Ben Wheatley |
| 2012 (15th) | Berberian Sound Studio | Peter Strickland |
| 2013 (16th) | Metro Manila | Sean Ellis |
| 2013 (16th) | Philomena | Stephen Frears |
| 2013 (16th) | The Selfish Giant | Clio Barnard |
| 2013 (16th) | Starred Up | David Mackenzie |
| 2013 (16th) | Le Week-End | Roger Michell |
| 2014 (17th) | Pride | Matthew Warchus |
| 2014 (17th) | 71 | Yann Demange |
| 2014 (17th) | Calvary | John Michael McDonagh |
| 2014 (17th) | Mr. Turner | Mike Leigh |
| 2014 (17th) | The Imitation Game | Morten Tyldum |
| 2015 (18th) | Ex Machina | Alex Garland |
| 2015 (18th) | Amy | Asif Kapadia |
| 2015 (18th) | 45 Years | Andrew Haigh |
| 2015 (18th) | The Lobster | Yorgos Lanthimos |
| 2015 (18th) | Macbeth | Justin Kurzel |
| 2016 (19th) | American Honey | Andrea Arnold, Lars Knudsen, Jay Van Hoy, Pouya Shahbazian, Alice Weinberg, Thomas Benski and Lucas Ochoa |
| 2016 (19th) | Couple in a Hole | Tom Geens |
| 2016 (19th) | I, Daniel Blake | Ken Loach |
| 2016 (19th) | Notes on Blindness | James Spinney and Peter Middleton |
| 2016 (19th) | Under the Shadow | Babak Anvari |
| 2017 (20th) | God's Own Country | Francis Lee |
| 2017 (20th) | The Death of Stalin | Armando Iannucci |
| 2017 (20th) | I Am Not a Witch | Rungano Nyoni |
| 2017 (20th) | Lady Macbeth | William Oldroyd |
| 2017 (20th) | Three Billboards Outside Ebbing, Missouri | Martin McDonagh |
| 2018 (21st) | The Favourite | Yorgos Lanthimos, Deborah Davis, Tony McNamara, Ceci Dempsey, Ed Guiney and Lee Magiday |
| 2018 (21st) | American Animals | Bart Layton, Katherine Butler, Dimitri Doganis, Derrin Schlesinger and Mary Jane Skalski |
| 2018 (21st) | Beast | Michael Pearce, Kristian Brodie, Lauren Dark and Ivana Mackinnon |
| 2018 (21st) | Disobedience | Sebastián Lelio, Rebecca Lenkiewicz, Ed Guiney, Frida Torresblanco and Rachel Weisz |
| 2018 (21st) | You Were Never Really Here | Lynne Ramsay, Pascal Caucheteux, Rosa Attab, James Wilson and Rebecca O'Brien |
| 2019 (22nd) | For Sama | Waad Al-Khateab and Edward Watts |
| 2019 (22nd) | Bait | Mark Jenkin |
| 2019 (22nd) | The Personal History of David Copperfield | Armando Iannucci |
| 2019 (22nd) | The Souvenir | Joanna Hogg |
| 2019 (22nd) | Wild Rose | Tom Harper |

=== 2020s ===
| Year | Film | Recipient(s) |
|---|---|---|
| 2020 (23rd) | Rocks | Sarah Gavron, Ameenah Ayub Allen, Faye Ward, Theresa Ikoko and Claire Wilson |
| 2020 (23rd) | Calm with Horses | Nick Rowland, Joe Murtagh and Daniel Emmerson |
| 2020 (23rd) | The Father | Florian Zeller, Christopher Hampton, David Parfitt, Jean-Louis Livi and Philippe Carcassonne |
| 2020 (23rd) | His House | Remi Weekes, Aidan Elliott, Martin Gentles, Arnon Milchan, Edward King and Roy Lee |
| 2020 (23rd) | Saint Maud | Rose Glass, Andrea Cornwell and Oliver Kassman |
| 2021 (24th) | After Love | Aleem Khan and Matthieu de Braconier |
| 2021 (24th) | Ali & Ava | Clio Barnard and Tracy O'Riordan |
| 2021 (24th) | Boiling Point | Philip Barantini, James Cummings, Bart Ruspoli and Hester Ruoff |
| 2021 (24th) | The Nest | Sean Durkin, Ed Guiney, Derrin Schlesinger, Rose Garnett, Amy Jackson and Christina Piovesan |
| 2021 (24th) | The Souvenir Part II | Joanna Hogg, Ed Guiney, Emma Norton, Andrew Lowe and Luke Schiller |
| 2022 (25th) | Aftersun | Charlotte Wells, Barry Jenkins, Mark Ceryak, Adele Romanski and Amy Jackson |
| 2022 (25th) | Blue Jean | Georgia Oakley and Hélène Sifre |
| 2022 (25th) | Good Luck to You, Leo Grande | Sophie Hyde, Katy Brand, Debbie Gray and Adrian Politowski |
| 2022 (25th) | Living | Oliver Hermanus, Kazuo Ishiguro, Stephen Woolley and Elizabeth Karlsen |
| 2022 (25th) | The Wonder | Sebastián Lelio, Emma Donoghue, Alice Birch, Juliette Howell, Andrew Lowe, Tessa Ross and Ed Guiney |
| 2023 (26th) | All of Us Strangers | Andrew Haigh, Graham Broadbent, Peter Czernin and Sarah Harvey |
| 2023 (26th) | Femme | Sam H. Freeman, Ng Choon Ping, Myles Payne and Sam Ritzenberg |
| 2023 (26th) | How to Have Sex | Molly Manning Walker, Ivana MacKinnon, Emily Leo and Konstantinos Kontovrakis |
| 2023 (26th) | Rye Lane | Raine Allen-Miller, Nathan Bryon, Tom Melia, Yvonne Isimeme Ibazebo and Damian Jones |
| 2023 (26th) | Scrapper | Charlotte Regan and Theo Barrowclough |
| 2024 (27th) | Kneecap | Rich Peppiatt, Trevor Birney and Jack Tarling |
| 2024 (27th) | Love Lies Bleeding | Rose Glass, Weronika Tofilska, Andrea Cornwell and Oliver Kassman |
| 2024 (27th) | On Becoming a Guinea Fowl | Rungano Nyoni, Tim Cole, Ed Guiney and Andrew Lowe |
| 2024 (27th) | The Outrun | Nora Fingscheidt, Amy Liptrot, Sarah Brocklehurst, Dominic Norris, Jack Lowden and Saoirse Ronan |
| 2024 (27th) | Santosh | Sandhya Suri, Mike Goodridge, James Bowsher, Balthazar de Ganay and Alan McAlex |
| 2025 (28th) | Pillion | Harry Lighton, Lee Groombridge, Ed Guiney, Andrew Lowe and Emma Norton |
| 2025 (28th) | The Ballad of Wallis Island | James Griffiths, Tom Basden, Tim Key and Rupert Majendie |
| 2025 (28th) | I Swear | Kirk Jones, Georgia Bayliff and Piers Tempest |
| 2025 (28th) | My Father's Shadow | Akinola Davies Jr., Wale Davies, Rachel Dargavel and Funmbi Ogunbanwo |
| 2025 (28th) | Urchin | Harris Dickinson, Archie Pearch and Scott O'Donnell |
