= Paul Popplewell =

British actor

Paul Popplewell is a British actor who has appeared in BAFTA, BIFA, Emmy, RTS, Sundance and Cannes Palme d'Or winning and nominated Film and TV productions. Paul is known for his role as Simon in the BBC Two TV film drama Criminal (1994). He has also played Paul Ryder of Happy Mondays in 24 Hour Party People (2001), in Tyrannosaur (2011), and Black Mirror's "Fifteen Million Merits" (2011). He also played Paul Pegg in Casualty (2021–2023).

== Early life and career ==
Popplewell landed his first role as an actor at age 16, playing lead role of Simon in the drama Criminal as part of Screen Two; The film was about a boy who with undiagnosed autism and from a council estate background in Bradford, for which he won Best Actor at the Golden Chest Film Festival and was nominated for Best Actor at the Royal Television Society Awards. The film won the award for best single drama at Royal Television Society Awards.

At the age of 20, Popplewell played in the Royal Shakespeare Company's production of Bad Weather at The Other Place in Stratford-upon-Avon, Warwickshire.

In 2001, he played Happy Mondays bassist and founder member Paul Ryder in the Michael Winterbottom film 24 Hour Party People. He later made an appearance in the music video for the Oasis single "Lyla" in 2005.

In 2011, Popplewell played the character of Bod in the BIFA and BAFTA winning feature film Tyrannosaur, which was written and directed by Paddy Considine, and also starred Olivia Colman, Peter Mullan and Eddie Marsan.

From 2021 to 2023, he played the receptionist, Paul Pegg in the BBC One drama Casualty.

== Personal life ==
Popplewell runs long distance to raise money for charity.

== Filmography ==
=== Feature Film ===
- Scoop
- Peterloo
- Journeyman
- On the Road (Wolf Alice)
- ID2: Shadwell Army
- The Goob
- '71
- The Cost of Living
- The Look of Love
- Spike Island
- Tyrannosaur
- The Trip
- Dog Altogether
- The Waiting Room
- Bright Young Things
- In This World
- Heartlands
- Morvern Callar
- 24 Hour Party People
- Club Le Monde
- The Man with Rain in His Shoes
- I Want You
- FairyTale: A True Story

=== Television ===
- Legends (2026 TV series) (2026, Netflix) – Detective Turner
- Casualty (2021–2023, BBC) – Paul Pegg
- Save Me (2020, Sky Atlantic) – DC Mark Harper
- The Salisbury Poisonings (2020, BBC) – DI Ben Mant
- Our World War (2014, BBC) – Sergeant Mitchell
- A Young Doctor's Notebook (2013, Sky Arts Playhouse Presents) – Yuri
- Moving On (2013, BBC) – Nathan
- Frankie (2013, BBC) – Tony Preston
- Shameless (2012, Channel 4) – Eddie
- Accused (2012, BBC) – Gary
- Inside Men (2012, BBC) – Tom
- Black Mirror: "Fifteen Million Merits" (2011, Channel 4) – Dustin
- Waterloo Road (2011, BBC) – Callum Pearson
- The Trip (2010, BBC) – Paul
- Emmerdale (2008, ITV) – Keith Lodge
- Saxondale (2007, BBC) – Freaky Dan
- The Wedge (2006, ITV)
- Simon Schama's Power of Art – Caravaggio (2006, BBC) – Caravaggio
- The Royal (2005–2009, ITV) – Marlon Barratt / Chris Nugent
- The Ghost Squad (2005, BBC) – DC Richard Ellis
- The Somme (2005, Channel 4) – Greenhalgh
- Totally Frank (2005, Channel 4) – Television Producer
- Gifted (2003, ITV Movie) – Sean Dwyer
- Rehab (2003, BBC Movie) – Phillip
- Alan Partridge (2001, BBC)
- The Bill (2001, BBC) – Patient
- Doctors (2000, BBC) – Jamie Farrell
- Heartbeat (2000, ITV) – Gary
- The League of Gentlemen (2000, BBC) – Collier
- Peak Practice (2000, BBC) – Greg Crinham
- Hetty Wainthropp Investigates (1997, BBC) – Frank Starling
- Island (1996, ITV)
- Out of The Blue (1995, BBC) – Eddie Locke
- Criminal (1994, BBC) – Simon
- Kids Court (1992, BSKYB)

=== Theatre ===
- The Last Testament of Lillian Bilocca – City of Culture/Hull Truck/Manchester Royal Exchange
- The Hypocrite – Royal Shakespeare Company (RSC)
- A Taste of Honey – Manchester Royal Exchange Theatre
- Toast – Hull Truck
- The Arbor – The Royal Court, London
- Harvest – The Royal Court, London
- The Shy Gas Man – Southwark Playhouse
- Under The Whaleback – Hull Truck
- The Modernists – Sheffield Crucible Theatre
- American Buffalo – Manchester Royal Exchange Theatre
- The Tempest – Royal Shakespeare Company (RSC)
- Bad Weather – Royal Shakespeare Company (RSC)
- Bartholomew Fair – Royal Shakespeare Company (RSC)

== Awards and nominations ==
Group	Award	Film	Result
British Arrows Craft Awards	Best Actor	Kick it Out	Won
Manchester Evening News Theatre Awards & TV Awards	Best Supporting Actor	American Buffalo	Nominated
Golden Chest International TV & Film Festival	Best Actor	Criminal	Won
Royal Television Society Awards (RTS Awards)	Best Actor	Criminal	Nominated
