= A Room for Romeo Brass =

- UK theatrical poster
- Directed by: Shane Meadows
- Written by: Paul Fraser; Shane Meadows
- Produced by: George Faber
- Starring: Andrew Shim; Ben Marshall; Paddy Considine; Frank Harper; Julia Ford; James Higgins; Vicky McClure; Ladene Hall; Bob Hoskins
- Cinematography: Ashley Rowe
- Edited by: Paul Tothill
- Music by: Nick Hemming
- Production companies: BBC Films; Company Pictures; The Arts Council of England; Big Arty
- Distributed by: Alliance Atlantis Releasing
- Release date: 23 August 1999 (UK)
- Running time: 90 minutes
- Country: United Kingdom
- Language: English

A Room for Romeo Brass is a 1999 British teen comedy-drama film directed by Shane Meadows, who also co-wrote the film with Paul Fraser. The film was mainly shot in Calverton, Nottinghamshire between 5 September and 17 October 1998. The location of the seaside scene was Chapel St. Leonards in Lincolnshire.

The film stars Andrew Shim as Romeo Brass, Ben Marshall as Gavin Woolley and Paddy Considine as Morell. It marked the screen debut of Vicky McClure and Considine, who would go on to star in Meadows' subsequent films, Dead Man's Shoes and Le Donk & Scor-zay-zee, chronologically. It was nominated in three categories at the 1999 British Independent Film Awards.

== Plot ==
12-year-old boys Romeo Brass and Gavin Woolley have been best friends and neighbours for most of their lives. Gavin suffers from a back injury which causes him to be bullied by other boys, while Romeo is quick to step in and defend him. One day Gavin is confronted by two boys, Romeo intervenes and things turn violent. Gavin's injury prevents him from assisting his friend.

During the fight Gavin spots Morell, who is several years older, and calls to him for help. Morell chases the two boys off and then drives Romeo and Gavin back home. Romeo's family notice that Morell's behaviour is a little unusual. Morell develops an immediate attraction toward Romeo's sister Ladine and seeks Romeo's advice about asking her out. Gavin plays a prank on Morell which results in him humiliating himself. Morell goes to the shop where Ladine works to apologise and ask her out again; she accepts but only out of pity and afterward doesn't plan to see him again.

The next day, Morell encourages the boys to miss school and accompany him to the beach. When Romeo goes to buy ice cream, Morell confronts Gavin about the prank that he pulled and viciously threatens him with what will happen if he ever tries to do it again.

Romeo continues spending time with Morell while Gavin goes into hospital for an operation, which results in Gavin distancing himself from both of them. Romeo looks up to Morell as a new father-figure after he is infuriated by his estranged and violent father Joe coming back into his old life. Morell even stands up to Joe to impress Romeo, though it's clear to Joe that Morell is a bully who hangs out with children because they are easy to impress. He grabs Morell during the argument but only succeeds in driving Romeo further away and causing Ladine to feel sympathy for Morell, and she gives him a real chance.

Morell is starting to behave more and more erratically, and encourages Romeo to embrace violence and to stay away from Gavin. On their second date, Ladine is in Morell's flat when he makes a pass at her which she rebuffs. Feeling rejected, Morell is angry and tries to persuade Ladine to at least fool around with him sexually, then escalates to demanding it and tries to prevent her from leaving. Realizing her father was right about Morell she begins to reconcile with him. Romeo goes to visit Morell only to have Morell take his frustrations out on him, bullying him and ejecting him from his flat. Romeo's mother pressures him to stop hanging out with the much older Morell, not realizing he has his own reasons to stop doing so.

The next day, Morell forces Romeo into his van in order to follow Ladine. In front of Romeo, Morell viciously attacks a customer whom Ladine was flirting with, which causes Romeo to run away. Upset by Morell's actions, Romeo goes to Gavin's house where he is comforted by Gavin's parents. Morell shows up having followed Romeo and starts to assault Gavin's dad Bill, then threatening to kill him. Witnessing this, Romeo's father Joe steps in to defend Bill, attacking Morell, and forcing him away. Romeo and Gavin reconcile their friendship and restore some semblance of normality back into their lives.

== Cast ==
- Andrew Shim as Romeo Brass
- Ben Marshall as Gavin "Knocks" Woolley
- Paddy Considine as Morell
- Vicky McClure as Ladine Brass
- Ladene Hall as Carol Brass
- Frank Harper as Joe Brass
- Julia Ford as Sandra Woolley
- James Higgins as Bill Woolley
- Bob Hoskins as Steven Laws
- Shane Meadows as Fish and Chip Shop Man

== Soundtrack ==
- "A Message to You Rudy", written by Dandy Livingstone, performed by The Specials
- "O Maria", written and performed by Beck
- "Dead Melodies", written and performed by Beck
- "Corpses in Their Mouths", written by Ian Brown, Aziz Ibrahim, performed by Ian Brown
- "Jesus Walking", written and performed by Nick Hemming as The Leisure Society
- "Matty Groves", traditional arranged by Sandy Denny, Ashley Hutchings, Richard Thompson, Dave Mattacks, Simon Nicol, Dave Swarbrick, performed by Fairport Convention
- "Twenty-Five Miles", written by Edwin Starr, Johnny Bristol, Harvey Fuqua, Jerry Ragovoy, Bert Berns, performed by Edwin Starr
- "Move It On Over", written and performed by Hank Williams
- "Stolen Car (Beth Orton song)", written by Beth Orton, Sean Read, performed by Beth Orton
- "John Lee", written by Dave Swarbrick, performed by Fairport Convention
- "Everything's Gonna Be Alright", written by Andrew Loog Oldham, Dave Skinner, performed by P.P. Arnold
- "Don't Forget Your Shovel", written by Christie Hennessy, performed by Christy Moore
- "Civvy Street Fiasco", written by Stephen Lawrie, performed by Unisex
- "Fox in the Snow", written and performed by Belle & Sebastian
- "5,6,7,8", written by Steve Crosby, Barry Upton, performed by Steps
- "Colours", written and performed by Donovan
- "Listen Here", written and performed by Eddie Harris
- "If This Is Love", written by Gavin Clarke, performed by Sunhouse
- "Going Down", written by Ian Brown, John Squire, performed by The Stone Roses
- "After Midnight", written and performed by JJ Cale
- "Everywhere", written by Greg Trooper, Ed Griffin, performed by Billy Bragg

== Reception ==
On Rotten Tomatoes the film has an approval rating of 68% based on reviews from 25 critics, with an average rating of 6.3/10.

British comedian Bob Mortimer discussed the film with radio presenter Simon Mayo and film critic Mark Kermode in 2005. Bob stated that A Room For Romeo Brass is his favourite film of all time, with Mark agreeing that it is "absolutely fantastic".

== Awards ==
- 1999 British Independent Film Awards (nominated)
  - Best British Film
  - Best Director (Shane Meadows)
  - Best Original Screenplay (Shane Meadows and Paul Fraser)
