= The Stone Roses: Made of Stone =

2013 British music documentary film

- Directed by: Shane Meadows
- Produced by: Mark Herbert; Libby Durdy
- Starring: Ian Brown; John Squire; Gary Mounfield; Alan Wren
- Cinematography: Laurie Rose
- Edited by: Matthew Gray; Chris King; Tobias Zaldua
- Production companies: Film4 Productions; Warp Films
- Distributed by: Picturehouse Entertainment
- Release date: 5 June 2013
- Running time: 96 minutes
- Country: United Kingdom
- Language: English
- Box office: $784,111

The Stone Roses: Made of Stone is a 2013 British music documentary on the acclaimed band The Stone Roses directed by Shane Meadows. The film stars band members Ian Brown, John Squire, Gary Mounfield and Alan Wren. The film was released on 5 June 2013 in the United Kingdom.

The film, which has received positive reviews from critics, follows the band reforming in 2012 after a 16-year split, capturing the band at work and in their everyday lives as they practise for their much-anticipated reunion on a tour across Europe, which culminated in three triumphant homecoming gigs at Manchester's Heaton Park.

== Cast ==
- Ian Brown as himself
- John Squire as himself
- Gary Mounfield as himself
- Alan Wren as himself
- Shane Meadows as himself
- Mark Herbert as himself
- Liam Gallagher as himself
- Eric Cantona as himself

== Home media ==
The film was released on DVD and Blu-ray on 21 October 2013.

== Critical response ==
The film has been generally praised by critics and has garnered a rating of 73% on review aggregation website Rotten Tomatoes, based on 26 critical reviews with an average rating of 6.9 out of 10. The consensus reads: "This is very much a fan's-eye view of the Roses. But Meadows' lack of critical distance from his subject pays off in spades by allowing him to capture the passion the Roses inspire in their fans."

Peter Bradshaw, film critic for The Guardian, awarded the film four out of five stars, writing: "Warm and energetic, Shane Meadows's love letter to the Stone Roses may be his best film so far". David Gritten, film critic for The Daily Telegraph, awarded the film four out of five stars, writing: "Shane Meadows has made a touching tribute to his favourite band - and to music fandom itself."
