= Dog Altogether =

- Film poster
- Directed by: Paddy Considine
- Written by: Paddy Considine
- Produced by: Diarmid Scrimshaw; Mark Herbert; Gillian Berrie; Anna Duffield; Wendy Griffin; Paul Welsh
- Starring: Peter Mullan; Olivia Colman; Paul Popplewell
- Cinematography: Thomas Townend
- Edited by: Colin Monie
- Music by: Chris Baldwin
- Distributed by: EM Media (with the support of); Scottish Screen; Sigma Films (co-production); Warp Films (co-production)
- Release date: 23 August 2007
- Running time: 16 mins
- Country: United Kingdom
- Language: English

Dog Altogether is a short film written and directed by Paddy Considine. The term "Dog Altogether" comes from an Irish expression that Considine's father used to use when situations got really bad. It was filmed on 22 January 2007 in Glasgow.

The lead role of Joseph is taken by Scottish actor/director Peter Mullan, who was hand-picked by Considine to play a role loosely based on Considine's late father (also called Joseph). Mullan is a winner of several BIFA and BAFTA best actor awards. British comedy actress Olivia Colman fills the supporting role as Anita. Colman, already having shot British comedy film Hot Fuzz with Considine, was approached to play the part due to her suitability for the role.

The story of this short was later expanded into the first Considine's feature film Tyrannosaur, with the same actors as the main characters.

== Plot ==
Dog Altogether is the story of Joseph (Peter Mullan), a man who is plagued by a violence and rage that is driving him to self-destruction. As he falls further into turmoil, Joseph scours the landscape in search of a single grain of redemption that might restore hope to his fractured life.

== Cast ==
- Peter Mullan as Joseph
- Olivia Colman as Anita
- Karl Johnson as Jack
- Paul Popplewell as Pub Youth 1
- William Ruane as Pub Youth 2
- Aston Kelly as Pub Youth 3
- Mahesh Soneji as Man in Post Office
- Gaurav Soodan as Youth in Post Office
- Osman Mohammed as Youth 1
- Patricia MacHugh as Barmaid
- Dominic Curran as Kid in Street

== Awards ==
- 2007: BAFTA award; Best Short Film.
- 2007: British Independent Film Awards; Best short film.
- 2007: Venice Film Festival: Silver Lion for Best Short Film.
- 2007: Seattle International Film Festival Short Film Jury Award (Narrative Special Jury Prize).
- 2007: Edinburgh International Film Festival; 2nd place for Best British Short. Special Mention
