= Tyrannosaur (film) =

2011 British drama film

- Tyrannosaur original poster by Dan McCarthy
- Directed by: Paddy Considine
- Written by: Paddy Considine
- Produced by: Diarmid Scrimshaw; Mark Herbert
- Starring: Peter Mullan; Olivia Colman; Eddie Marsan; Paul Popplewell; Sally Carman
- Cinematography: Erik Wilson
- Edited by: Pia Di Ciaula
- Production companies: Warp X Inflammable Films; Film4; UK Film Council; Screen Yorkshire; EM Media; Optimum Releasing
- Distributed by: StudioCanal
- Release dates: 21 January 2011 (Sundance); 7 October 2011 (United Kingdom)
- Running time: 92 minutes
- Country: United Kingdom
- Language: English
- Budget: £750,000
- Box office: £396,930

Tyrannosaur is a 2011 British drama film written and directed by Paddy Considine and starring Peter Mullan, Olivia Colman, Eddie Marsan, Paul Popplewell and Sally Carman.

== Plot ==
Joseph, a middle-aged widower living in northern England, kills his dog, Bluey, in a drunken rage following a dispute with a local bookmaker. He immediately regrets the act. He then goes to a local post office, where out of frustration, he harasses several Pakistani employees. Later, in a pub, Joseph verbally attacks three young men after overhearing banter of a homosexual nature. Perhaps mistaking this as directed at himself, he threatens one man and knocks him unconscious, while one man flees and the third is assaulted with a pool cue. After fleeing the pub through the rear exit, Joseph hides under the rails in a nearby charity shop. Here, he meets Hannah, a devout Christian and the owner of the store. She prays with him, encouraging him to release his anger and seek peace.

Joseph later encounters his six-year-old neighbour, Samuel, while the child’s mother is inside with her abusive boyfriend. That evening, Joseph is assaulted and beaten unconscious by the Pakistani men from the post office. The following day, he returns to Hannah’s shop, where she tends to his injuries. Despite her kindness, Joseph mocks her religious faith and insults her infertility, upsetting her deeply, and abruptly leaves.

The following morning, after being urinated on as she slept by her abusive husband, James, Hannah cleans her sofa. James is affectionate toward her, behaving as if nothing had happened while she tends to the cleaning. Later that night, Hannah drinks wine alone and falls asleep.

The following day, Joseph visits Hannah's shop to apologise. Hannah forgives him and helps him pick out a suit for the funeral of his late friend, Jack. James arrives unexpectedly, and after seeing Hannah fitting a tie for Joseph, he quietly insults her and accuses her of infidelity before leaving. The following evening, James violently assaults Hannah while she is semi-conscious.

Hannah leaves James and asks Joseph if she can stay with him temporarily, which he agrees to. The two develop a close friendship. Joseph reveals that his wife died five years earlier due to complications from diabetes. He expresses regret over having nicknamed her “Tyrannosaur;” a reference both to her weight and to the heavy sound of her footsteps on the staircase. The timbre of her steps was distinctive and reminded him of the stomping creatures in Jurassic Park, which inspired the nickname. He admits that this had previously been dismissed on his part as humour, but realised later that he had been a 'cunt'. After Hannah insists that she still thinks he is a good person, he explains that he feels he is not good for anyone. Hannah responds with a long and embracing hug.

Concerned that Hannah is not safe with him, Joseph urges her to leave. After attending Jack’s funeral with Hannah, Joseph decides to confront James. He takes Hannah’s keys and goes to her house, where he discovers James’s bloodied corpse in the bedroom. Shocked, Joseph returns home and confronts Hannah. She initially feigns ignorance but then reveals that she killed James after years of severe abuse, revealing that he had raped her and previously sexually assaulted her with glass, resulting in her infertility.

One year later, Joseph writes Hannah a letter, explaining that Samuel was mauled by his mother’s boyfriend’s dog. In retaliation, Joseph beheaded the dog with a machete. When Samuel’s stepfather confronts him, Joseph appears dissociated, sitting in an armchair outside his destroyed shed.

In the epilogue, Joseph reflects that he had admired Hannah from afar because she was the only person who consistently treated him with kindness. Wearing the suit he purchased from Hannah, he visits Hannah in prison, and the two embrace. Joseph then walks alone down a long road toward the horizon.

== Cast ==
- Peter Mullan as Joseph
- Olivia Colman as Hannah
- Eddie Marsan as James
- Paul Popplewell as Bod
- Samuel Bottomley as Samuel
- Sian Breckin as Samuel's Mum
- Ned Dennehy as Tommy
- Sally Carman as Marie
- Julia Mallam as Drunk Woman
- Andrew Milburn as Guy in Pub
- Natalia Carta as Drunk Woman's friend

== Production ==
Tyrannosaur is an expansion of Dog Altogether, a short film for Warp Films that Considine wrote and directed, which won the Best Short Film BAFTA and BIFA awards as well as the Silver Lion award at Venice in 2007. The film received a grant of £206,540 from the National Lottery fund through the UK Film Council. The remainder of the film's budget came from Warp X, Inflammable Films, Film4, Screen Yorkshire, EM Media, and Optimum Releasing (StudioCanal). It depicts an environment similar to what Considine witnessed growing up on a council estate in the Midlands, although the film is in no way autobiographical. The film's title is a metaphor, the meaning of which is revealed in the film.

The film is set in an unspecified town in the North of England, although much of it was shot on location in residential areas of Leeds and Wakefield, including Seacroft, Cross Gates, Eccup, Harehills and Alwoodley, and the accents of many of the main characters are drawn from a wide geographical area. The film refers to the fictional Manners Estate as an area in the town where the more wealthy inhabitants reside. Manners Estate is the name of the council estate in the parish of Winshill near Burton-on-Trent, where Paddy Considine grew up.

Many of the extras used in the film were local residents, including local busker Chris Wheat, who was given a part after singing to the cast and crew on set. He performs his own original song in the film. Workers from the local St Vincent's Charity Shop used in the film were also given small parts. Several other small roles were given to crew members, including the film's producer, Diarmid Scrimshaw, the film's make-up designer, Nadia Stacey, and the production coordinator, Samantha Milnes, who was featured in a photo as Joseph's late wife. The film is dedicated to Considine's late mother, Pauline Considine. The end credits gives special thanks to both James Marsh and Gary Oldman.

== Soundtrack ==
The film contained the following tracks. Original music was composed by Chris Baldwin and Dan Baker.

1. "Wand'rin' Star" – Nick Hemming (of The Leisure Society), cover of Lee Marvin's 1969 hit song from the western musical film Paint Your Wagon
2. "This Gun Loves you Back" – Chris Baldwin (written By Paddy Considine & Chris Baldwin)
3. "Truth or Glory" – JJ All Stars
4. "Saturday Night" – JJ All Stars
5. "Psycho Mash" – JJ All Stars
6. "Hi Jack" – Chris Wheat
7. "Sing All Our Cares Away" – Damien Dempsey
8. "We Were Wasted" – The Leisure Society

== Reception ==
=== Box office ===
The film grossed £396,930, below its £750,000 production budget.

=== Critical response ===
Tyrannosaur received positive reviews. On Rotten Tomatoes, it holds an approval rating of 83%, based on 88 reviews. The critical consensus states: "Tyrannosaur is a brutal, frank, and ultimately rewarding story of violent men seeking far-off redemption." The film also has a score of 65 out of 100 based on 18 critics on Metacritic, indicating "Generally favourable reviews".

Kim Newman of Empire wrote the "character study is as gripping as any hardboiled thriller, delivering emotional content that'll stay with you for a long time", and gave it 4/5 stars. Peter Bradshaw of The Guardian also awarded the film 4 out of 5 stars and wrote, "I have heard Tyrannosaur criticised as a movie that comes too close to miserablist cliche, but that isn't true: it's a visceral, considered dissection of abuse and rage and the dysfunctional relationships that rage creates, which, in turn, perpetuate that rage, and an examination of people who create their own eco-system of anger and unhappiness. The performances of Mullan, Colman and Marsan are excellent and create a compelling human drama. Tyrannosaur is far from a love story, but it is not a simply a hate story, either; it is certainly a very impressive debut from Considine." Other publications that awarded the film 4/5 stars included The Daily Telegraph and the Evening Standard.

The American film critic and blogger Jeffrey Wells was so taken by Tyrannosaur after seeing it at the Los Angeles Film Festival that he started 'Hollywood Elsewhere's Tyrannosaur fundraising campaign' with the idea of raising $2,000 to cover the rental of a screening room for Hollywood critics, with the hope of the film gaining recognition. Wells claimed this was the first screening financed by a critic.

Roger Ebert of the Chicago Sun-Times gave the film 3.5 stars out of 4, calling Peter Mullan's performance muscular and unrelenting. He also remarked: "This isn't the kind of movie that even has hope enough to contain a message. There is no message, only the reality of these wounded personalities."

Mark Kermode of BBC Radio 5 Live hailed the film as one of the 11 Best Films of 2011. Kermode went on to award Olivia Colman Best Actress in his own Annual Kermode Awards. She tied with Tilda Swinton for We Need to Talk About Kevin.

By 18 December 2011, the film had won 21 awards from 28 nominations worldwide. The Guardian included the film in its shortlist for the First Film Award for 2012.

When the BAFTA Award nominations were announced on 17 January 2012, the omission of Olivia Colman in the Best Actress category led to global trending of both Olivia Colman and Tyrannosaur on Twitter.

== Accolades ==
Year	Award	Category	Nominee(s)	Result
2011	Sundance Film Festival	The World Cinema Award for Directing: Dramatic	Paddy Considine	Won
2011	Sundance Film Festival	World Cinema Special Jury Prize for Breakout Performance	Peter Mullan	Won
2011	Sundance Film Festival	World Cinema Special Jury Prize for Breakout Performance	Olivia Colman	Won
2011	Sundance Film Festival	Grand Jury Prize for World Cinema – Dramatic	Paddy Considine	Nominated
2011	Nantucket Film Festival	Best Writer/Director	Paddy Considine	Won
2011	Munich Film Festival	Best Film By An Emerging Director (CineVision Award)	Paddy Considine	Won
2011	Voices Festival of Independent European Cinema	Best Film		Won
2011	Voices Festival of Independent European Cinema	Best Acting	Olivia Colman	Won
2011	Dinard British Film Festival	Golden Hitchcock for Best Film		Won
2011	Dinard British Film Festival	Best Screenplay	Paddy Considine	Won
2011	Chicago International Film Festival	Silver Hugo Award for Best Actress	Olivia Colman	Won
2011	Zagreb Film Festival	Best Film		Won
2011	Thessaloniki International Film Festival	Open Horizons (Audience Award)		Won
2011	Mar del Plata Film Festival	Jury Special Award		Won
2011	Mar del Plata Film Festival	Silver Astor for Best Screenplay	Paddy Considine	Won
2011	Stockholm Film Festival	Best Directorial Debut	Paddy Considine	Won
2011	Stockholm Film Festival	Best Actress	Olivia Colman	Won
2011	Stockholm Film Festival	Best Film	Paddy Considine	Nominated
2011	British Independent Film Awards	Best British Independent Film		Won
2011	British Independent Film Awards	Best Director	Paddy Considine	Nominated
2011	British Independent Film Awards	Best Debut Director	Paddy Considine	Won
2011	British Independent Film Awards	Best Actress	Olivia Colman	Won
2011	British Independent Film Awards	Best Actor	Peter Mullan	Nominated
2011	British Independent Film Awards	Best Supporting Actor	Eddie Marsan (Note: Also for War Horse)	Nominated
2011	British Independent Film Awards	Best Achievement in Production		Nominated
2011	Satellite Awards	Best Actress in a Motion Picture	Olivia Colman	Nominated
2011	Satellite Awards	Best Original Screenplay	Paddy Considine	Nominated
2011	Satellite Awards	Best First Feature	Paddy Considine	Won
2012	Independent Spirit Awards	Best International Film		Nominated
2012	London Film Critics Circle Awards	Breakthrough British Filmmaker	Paddy Considine	Nominated
2012	London Film Critics Circle Awards	British Actress of the Year	Olivia Colman (Note: Also for The Iron Lady)	Won
2012	London Film Critics Circle Awards	British Actor of the Year	Peter Mullan	Nominated
2012	BAFTA Awards	Outstanding Debut by a British Writer, Director or Producer	Paddy Considine, Diarmid Scrimshaw	Won
2012	Evening Standard British Film Awards	Best Film		Nominated
2012	Evening Standard British Film Awards	Best Actor	Peter Mullan	Nominated
2012	Evening Standard British Film Awards	Best Actress	Olivia Colman	Won
2012	Evening Standard British Film Awards	Best Screenplay	Paddy Considine	Nominated
2012	Kermode Awards	Best Actress	Olivia Colman (Note: Shared with Tilda Swinton for We Need to Talk About Kevin)	Won
2012	Empire Awards	Best British Film		Nominated
2012	Empire Awards	Best Actress	Olivia Colman	Won
2012	Bucharest International Film Festival (Bucuresti IFF)	Best Film		Won
2012	Bucharest International Film Festival (Bucuresti IFF)	Critics’ Choice Award		Won
2012	Transilvania International Film Festival	FIPRESCI Prize		Won
