= Shane Meadows =

English director, screenwriter and actor

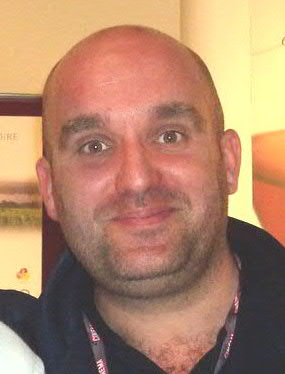
- Meadows in 2009
- Born: 26 December 1972 (age 53); Uttoxeter, Staffordshire, England
- Occupations: Director; screenwriter; actor
- Years active: 1994–present
- Spouse: Joanne Wilkinson
- Website: shanemeadows.com

Shane Meadows (born 26 December 1972) is an English director, screenwriter and actor, known for his work in independent film, most notably the cult film This Is England (2006) and its three television sequels (2010–2015).

Meadows' other films include Small Time (1996), Twenty Four Seven (1997), A Room for Romeo Brass (1999), Once Upon a Time in the Midlands (2002), Dead Man's Shoes (2004), Somers Town (2008), Le Donk & Scor-zay-zee (2009), and The Stone Roses: Made of Stone (2013).

== Early life ==
Meadows was born on 26 December 1972 in Uttoxeter, Staffordshire. Meadows' father, Arty, was a lorry driver and his mother a shop assistant.

In 1982, when Meadows was 10, his father discovered the body of Susan Maxwell, a child murder victim of Robert Black, beside the A518 in Staffordshire and was initially a suspect in the murder case, which led to Meadows being bullied at school. At this time, his parents sent him to live with his aunt in an effort to protect him from the media coverage, but Meadows was bullied and sexually assaulted. He described to The Guardian that he buried his sexual assault, resulting in periods of depression that started in his 20s, and in his 40s was diagnosed with PTSD and received EMDR therapy.

Meadows moved to Nottingham when he was 20.

Meadows left school before completing his GCSEs and took advantage of the emergence of video to start shooting short films.

== Career ==
Meadows enrolled on a Performing Arts course at Burton College, where he first met friend and future collaborator Paddy Considine. They formed the band She Talks to Angels (inspired by a Black Crowes song of the same name), with Meadows as vocalist and Considine as drummer. Lead guitarist in She Talks To Angels was Nick Hemming, who was also a member of the Telescopes and now fronts The Leisure Society.

The majority of Meadows' films have been set in the Midlands. While they recall the kitchen sink realism of filmmakers such as Mike Leigh and Alan Clarke, their use of autobiographical material and popular music soundtracks were influenced by Martin Scorsese's Mean Streets, the film which Meadows has credited with inspiring him to become a filmmaker: "It was obviously about people Scorsese understood and had grown up with. It was the first time that I thought, 'Maybe you don't have to make a film about a genre, maybe you can make a film about your own life.' "

Much of the content of his films is semi-autobiographical and based on his experiences in Uttoxeter. Twenty Four Seven was inspired by his youth, both at a boxing club, and also playing in a local football club. Despite some huge losses, the club's coach never lost faith in them. A Room for Romeo Brass was also inspired by his youth. After Paul Fraser, his best friend, neighbour and future writing partner, had a bad accident and was bed-bound for two years, Meadows hung around with some of the town's more undesirable characters. Dead Man's Shoes is based on the more unpleasant side of his youth in Uttoxeter, where a close friend who had been bullied developed a drug problem and then committed suicide. Meadows said "I couldn't believe that, going back ten years later, he had been totally forgotten in the town – it was as if he had never existed. I was filled with anger against the people who had bullied and pushed the drugs on him, and with despair at what drugs had done to that small community". In an interview for his 2019 series The Virtues, Meadows discussed the abuse he suffered as a nine-year old, and how the experience has undoubtedly influenced his work.

Five of Meadows' films were shown at the 2007 Flourish Festival, held annually in Uttoxeter, to mark the release of This is England (a film set in 1983).

His second feature-length film, Twenty Four Seven, won several awards at film festivals, including the Douglas Hickox award at the British Independent Film Awards and Best Screenplay at the Thessaloniki Film Festival. Dead Man's Shoes, his sixth film, and third starring Paddy Considine, was nominated for a BAFTA for Best British Film. His seventh film This is England, won the British Independent Film Awards 2006 for best British independent film. Meadows was presented with the award by Sylvester Stallone and used the occasion to announce that he was to be a father. This is England also won a BAFTA for Best British Film.

This is England has since had a series of sequels adapted into television serials. The first series, This is England 86 (set in 1986), aired on Channel 4 in September 2010). A second series, This is England 88 (set in 1988) was aired in December 2011. A third and final series, This Is England '90 (set in 1990), was originally due to be broadcast in December 2012, but in July 2012, Shane Meadows announced that the production had been put on hold in order for him to complete his documentary about The Stone Roses, and the actors were still waiting for confirmation as to when filming would start. The series was finally broadcast in September 2015, and was met with critical acclaim. Phil Harrison of The Guardian stated: "Shane Meadows has once again elicited some remarkable performances from his actors and the result is emotionally draining for everyone who has taken these characters to our hearts." Morgan Jeffery of Digital Spy also wrote that "...all things considered, this series - this saga - remains an astounding accomplishment from Meadows and co-writer Jack Thorne."

In 2021 the BBC announced that Meadows is to direct a tv series based on a novel by Benjamin Myers and produced by Element Pictures. The Gallows Pole is a period drama set against the backdrop of the coming industrial revolution in 18th century Yorkshire. The drama follows King David Hartley as he assembles a gang of weavers and land-workers to embark upon a revolutionary criminal enterprise that will capsize the economy and become the biggest fraud in British history.

In 2025, Meadows completed principal photography on Chork, a film he co-wrote alongside Jack Thorne.

== Filmography ==
=== Feature films ===
Year	Title	Notes
1996	Small Time	
1997	Twenty Four Seven	
1999	A Room for Romeo Brass	
2002	Once Upon a Time in the Midlands	
2004	Dead Man's Shoes	
2006	This Is England	
2008	Somers Town	
2009	Le Donk & Scor-zay-zee	
2013	The Stone Roses: Made of Stone	
TBA	Chork	Post-production

=== Television ===
Date	Title	Episodes	Channel	Notes
2010	This Is England '86	4 (60 mins)	Channel 4	Directed episodes 3 and 4
2011	This Is England '88	3 (60 mins)	Channel 4	
2015	This Is England '90	4 (60 mins, Ep.4: 75 mins)	Channel 4	
2019	The Virtues	3 (45+ mins, Ep.4: 75 mins)	Channel 4	
2023	The Gallows Pole	3 (60 mins)	BBC	

=== Online series ===
Date	Title	Episodes	Channel	Notes
2019	Charity Shop Sue			

=== Short films ===
Date	Title	Duration	Distribution	Notes
1994	Where's the Money, Ronnie?	10 mins		Second Version
1994	Where's the Money, Ronnie?	10 mins		First Version
1994	The Datsun Connection	13 mins		
1994	The Murderer	5 mins		
1994	Little Man	10 mins		
1994	The Cleaner	2 mins		
1995	The Pasta Twist	11 mins		
1995	The Stretch	16 mins		
1995	The Allotment Show	2 mins		
1995	Sneinton Junction	6 mins		
1995	Jock and John are Neighbours	7 mins		
1995	Black Wiggow	10 mins		
1995	King of the Gypsies	6 mins		Documentary
1995	King of the Gypsies	10 mins		Documentary
1995	Kill Me Now, Mummy	7 mins		
1995	Karate Youth	3 mins		
1995	The Zombie Squad	11 mins		
1995	Where's The Money, Ronnie?	14 mins		Third Version
1995	A Glyde in the Park	5 mins		
1996	The Rise and Fall of a Protection Agency	20 mins		
1996	Where's the Money, Ronnie?	12 mins		Final (Fourth) Version
1996	Simon Stanway is Not Dead	18 mins		
1996	Torino Torino	15 mins		Documentary
1996	The Church of Alan Darcy	8 mins		
1997	Come Back Dominic Dillon	12 mins		
1997	Waiting For the Winter	16 mins		
1997	In the Meantime Afternoon	20 mins		Documentary
1997	A Room For Romeo Brass	13 mins		
1998	Paul, Simon, Dominic and Snowy Cabrerra	14 mins		
1998	Daihatsu Domino	9 mins		
1998	Size Sixteen Feet	6 mins		
1998	There was a Wolf in the Room Mum, and it was Dying	2 mins		
1998	It was just a little Chimp, about six inches tall and he wore a little red sweater	5 mins		
1998	Autumn in the Heart	7 mins		
1998	Hospital Stanway	9 mins		
1998	A Room for Romeo Brass rehearsals	11 mins		
1998	All the Way Through	5 mins		
1999	Le Donk Episodic One Slap	19 mins		
1999	Le Donk Episodic Two Slap	15 mins		
1999	Billy Gumbo	10 mins		
1999	Willy Gumbo	20 mins		
1999	Le Donk Rat Attack	15 mins		
1999	Simon Stanway 3	5 mins		
1999	Gary Golfer	8 mins		
1999	Eric D'ya Get the Jisto	5 mins		
1999	Stars of Track and Field	30 mins		
2000	Shane's World: Macca's Men; The Man With No Name; The Poppa Squeeze Affair; Three Tears for Jimmy Prophet; Tank's Top Tips	70 mins		
2004	Northern Soul	30 mins		
2005	The Stairwell	40 secs		Produced for the Nokia Shorts competition
2007	Valentine			Promotional music video for track by Richard Hawley, from his album Lady's Bridge
2007	Serious			Promotional music video for track by Richard Hawley, from his album Lady's Bridge.
2007	The Living Room			Documentary about musician, Gavin Clark

== Collaborators ==
Meadows frequently collaborates with various actors and film crew members. Paul Fraser (a childhood friend) has been Meadows' co-writer and contributor for all of his films except his This is England projects, Small Time and Le Donk & Scor-zay-zee. Fraser also worked as second unit director/assistant director for Somers Town. He appears in Once Upon a Time in the Midlands as "Bingo Checker", A Room for Romeo Brass as "Physiotherapist" (uncredited) and 24 7: Twenty Four Seven as "Photographer".

Meadows has worked many times with producer Mark Herbert and cinematographer Danny Cohen.

Meadows has often discussed the importance of looking after his cast members, particularly in films that tackle such issues as racism and sexual abuse - he told The Guardian: "I’ve always tried to make sure that no one gets damaged."

=== Music ===
Many of Meadows's films have had original music provided by:

- Gavin Clark of Clayhill, Clayhill also appeared in "Northern Soul" (short). Clark was the subject of a Meadows documentary The Living Room (2007). Meadows met Clark when they both worked at Alton Towers.
- Nick Hemming and The Leisure Society.
- Ludovico Einaudi an Italian pianist and composer.

== Recurring cast members ==
Shane Meadows often casts certain actors more than once in his films. Meadows has most frequently worked with Paddy Considine, Vicky McClure, Andrew Shim, Thomas Turgoose, Frank Harper and Jo Hartley.

Actor	Where's the Money, Ronnie? (1996)	Small Time (1996)	24 7: Twenty Four Seven (1997)	A Room for Romeo Brass (1999)	Shane's World (2000)	Once Upon a Time in the Midlands (2002)	Dead Man's Shoes (2004)	Northern Soul (Short) (2004)	The Stairwell (Short) (2005)	This Is England (2006)	Somers Town (2008)	Le Donk & Scor-zay-zee (2009)	This Is England '86 (2010)	This Is England '88 (2011)	This Is England '90 (2015)	The Virtues (2019)	Charity Shop Sue (2019)	The Gallows Pole (2023)	Total
Andrew Shim				X mark		X mark	X mark		X mark	X mark			X mark	X mark	X mark				8
Vicky McClure				X mark					X mark	X mark			X mark	X mark	X mark		X mark		6
Jo Hartley							X mark	X mark		X mark			X mark	X mark	X mark				6
Thomas Turgoose										X mark	X mark		X mark	X mark	X mark			X mark	6
Stephen Graham										X mark			X mark	X mark	X mark	X mark			5
Michael Socha										X mark			X mark	X mark	X mark			X mark	5
Ladene Hall			X mark	X mark		X mark								X mark					4
Paddy Considine				X mark	X mark		X mark					X mark							4
George Newton							X mark			X mark			X mark	X mark					4
Joe Gilgun										X mark			X mark	X mark	X mark				4
Rosamund Hanson										X mark			X mark	X mark	X mark				4
Chanel Cresswell										X mark			X mark	X mark	X mark				4
Andrew Ellis										X mark			X mark	X mark	X mark				4
Danielle Watson										X mark			X mark	X mark	X mark				4
Kriss Dosanjh										X mark			X mark	X mark	X mark				4
Perry Benson										X mark	X mark		X mark		X mark				4
Mat Hand	X mark	X mark	X mark																3
Jimmy Hynd	X mark	X mark	X mark																3
Dena Smiles		X mark	X mark											X mark					3
Tanya Myers		X mark	X mark	X mark															3
Frank Harper			X mark	X mark						X mark									3
Ian Smith			X mark							X mark				X mark					3
Hannah Walters										X mark			X mark	X mark					3
Steve Brody													X mark	X mark	X mark				3
Katherine Dow Blyton													X mark	X mark	X mark				3
Johnny Harris													X mark	X mark	X mark				3
Rebecca Manley													X mark	X mark	X mark				3
William Travis													X mark	X mark	X mark				3
Seamus O'Neill							X mark					X mark	X mark						3
Helen Behan														X mark	X mark	X mark			3
Dominic Dillon		X mark	X mark																2
Darren O. Campbell			X mark	X mark															2
Bob Hoskins			X mark	X mark															2
Johann Myers			X mark	X mark															2
Justin Brady			X mark			X mark													2
Anthony Clarke			X mark			X mark													2
Tony Nyland			X mark			X mark													2
Karl Collins			X mark												X mark				2
Dave Blant				X mark						X mark									2
Craig Considine					X mark		X mark												2
Matt Considine					X mark		X mark												2
Toby Kebbell							X mark	X mark											2
Emily Aston							X mark							X mark					2
Joe Dempsie													X mark		X mark				2
Perry Fitzpatrick													X mark		X mark				2
Lyra Mae Thomas														X mark	X mark				2
Neil Bell							X mark								X mark				2
Sherrie Johnson															X mark		X mark		2
