= Le Donk & Scor-zay-zee =

- Original poster
- Directed by: Shane Meadows
- Written by: Shane Meadows
- Produced by: Mark Herbert
- Starring: Paddy Considine; Olivia Colman; Dean Palinczuk; Shane Meadows
- Edited by: Richard Graham
- Music by: Scorzayzee
- Distributed by: Warp Films
- Release date: 9 October 2009
- Running time: 71 minutes
- Country: United Kingdom
- Language: English
- Budget: £228,000

Le Donk & Scor-zay-zee is a 2009 British mockumentary comedy film written and directed by Shane Meadows. It follows the fictional character of Le Donk, played by Paddy Considine, a roadie working for Arctic Monkeys, and Scorzayzee, a young rapper playing himself.

Similar in format to This Is Spinal Tap (1984) and I'm Still Here (2010), the film blends fiction and reality. In addition to Scorzayzee, director Meadows, editor Richard Graham, and Arctic Monkeys all appear as themselves. Shot in five days in 2007 with a budget of £48,000, the film is the third Meadows feature to star Considine.

== Plot ==
Aging, failed musician and roadie Le Donk is introduced to a fly on the wall documentary film crew, including real life director Meadows, at his Nottingham home. Scorzayzee is an aspiring rapper who Le Donk is mentoring. Le Donk and the film crew visit the home of his former girlfriend Olivia (Olivia Colman), who is pregnant with Le Donk's child. Le Donk becomes irate when he learns Olivia's new boyfriend is to be her birth partner.

Le Donk, Scorzayzee, Meadows, and the film crew drive to Manchester in a Bedford Rascal, where Le Donk has been hired to assist at "Arctical" Monkeys' gig at Old Trafford Cricket Ground. Le Donk intends to use his contacts to attain a supporting slot for Scorzayzee. Leaving the seemingly-hapless Scorzayaee to practice on his new electronic keyboard, Le Donk goes backstage and speaks to Arctic Monkeys' guitar tech Nigel "Big Nige" Reeks. Scorzayzee, unable to operate or even power-on the keyboard, wanders through the cricket ground, eventually ending up on the stage, which Le Donk has left. Big Nige helps Scorzayzee hook up the keyboard to the sound system and shows him how to get some "beats." Scorzayzee then freestyles, impressing those present. A short time later, Le Donk confirms that a short support slot has been granted. After this, it is revealed that Le Donk is to accompany Scorzayzee, playing the (obviously automated) loops on the keyboard and singing in between Scorzayzee's rap verses.

Later in the evening, Le Donk receives a call from Olivia's boyfriend, as she has gone into labour. Le Donk is at first reluctant to let Scorzayzee play the gig on his own, worried that he would not be able to handle the keyboards. ("It's a lot of beats") Le Donk then admits he is not required and that Scorzayzee is "the talent." Le Donk drives back to Nottingham and meets his baby son, and Olivia convinces him to travel back to Manchester to play.

The following afternoon, the two take to the stage at Old Trafford and play one song with the crowd reacting well to Scorzayzee's rapping but seemingly bemused by Le Donk's lyrics, which begin "Just calm down Deirdre Barlow, just calm down Stephen Hawking."

== Production ==
Following the lengthy production of Meadows' previous film, 2006's This is England, he searched for a stripped-back, corporate-free project made with £50,000 Meadow's and producer Mark Herbert's own money. He initially considered making a film under the Dogme 95 rules, but decided the strict style was too constraining. Instead, along with Herbert, he devised the "Five Day Feature." The film was shot in the five days leading up to Arctic Monkeys' gig at Old Trafford on 28 July 2007. The film was shot on two digital cameras that ran constantly for four days, and extra footage was shot on the fifth day after the edit. Matt Helders and Nick O'Malley from the band appear in the film, playing themselves, while talking to Le Donk about Scorzayzee's initial performance the day before the gig. The full band is glimpsed briefly, walking past Scorzayzee as he searches for a place to plug his keyboard. The band had been introduced to Meadows and Herbert prior to the release of their debut album in 2006. After this, Considine was featured in the video for their third single, "Leave Before the Lights Come On".

Only a loose script was written, with most of the dialogue being improvised.

== Critical reception ==
As of June 2020, the review aggregator Rotten Tomatoes reported an 87% approval rating, based on 21 reviews with an average score of 6.24/10.

Kevin Maher of The Times called the film "ebullient" and Considine's performance "an enthralling piece of improvisation that carries the entire movie." Dave Calhoun of Time Out London found the film "an endearing effort with enough heart to fill the gaps where the gags dry up or fall flat" and added, "When Considine really gets going, he's as funny as he's ever been." In The Observer, Philip French observed, "Considine is outrageously funny and never steps out of character, but the film hardly adds up to an evening's entertainment," while Anthony Quinn of The Independent noted, "Throughout you get the impression that Meadows and his cast are having a lot of fun, which is unfortunately not the same thing as being funny. Even with a short running time . . . this scrappy, unendearing squib outstays its welcome."
