= Chork (film) =

British drama film

- Directed by: Shane Meadows
- Screenplay by: Shane Meadows; Jack Thorne
- Produced by: Ben Pugh; Cathy King; Lauren Dark; Amy Jackson
- Production companies: BBC Film; BFI; Unified; 42; Big Arty; One Shoe Films
- Distributed by: Altitude Film Distribution
- Country: United Kingdom
- Language: English

Chork is an upcoming British film directed by Shane Meadows, which he co-wrote with Jack Thorne. It was filmed in 2025.

== Premise ==
Having been placed in foster care, fifteen-year-old Kit and eleven-year-old Ani run-away and evade a police search as they continue to pursue a course up the coast of the United Kingdom.

== Production ==
The film was developed with BBC Film and co-written by Shane Meadows and Jack Thorne and directed by Meadows. It was produced by Ben Pugh and Cathy King for 42 with Lauren Dark and Amy Jackson for Unified, and co-produced by Big Arty and One Shoe Films. Funding also came from the British Film Institute, Screen Yorkshire and Hoopsa Films.

Principal photography was completed in the first half of 2025. The film was set and filmed along the eastern coast of England from Kent through to Lincolnshire and up to Scotland.

== Release ==
Upon completion of principal photography in June 2025, the film was reportedly set for release by Altitude Film Distribution in the UK and Ireland in 2026. However, as of November 2026, no release date has been set.
