= Dead Man's Shoes (2004 film) =

- Theatrical release poster
- Directed by: Shane Meadows
- Written by: Paddy Considine; Paul Fraser; Shane Meadows
- Produced by: Mark Herbert; Louise Meadows
- Starring: Paddy Considine; Gary Stretch; Toby Kebbell
- Cinematography: Danny Cohen
- Edited by: Celia Haining; Lucas Roche; Chris Wyatt
- Music by: Clayhill; The Leisure Society
- Production companies: Warp Films; Big Arty Productions; EM Media; Film4
- Distributed by: Optimum Releasing
- Release date: 1 October 2004
- Running time: 90 minutes
- Country: United Kingdom
- Language: English
- Budget: £723,000
- Box office: £183,740 (UK) / $414,736 (Worldwide)

Dead Man's Shoes is a 2004 British psychological thriller revenge tragedy film directed by Shane Meadows and starring Paddy Considine, both of whom co-wrote the film with Paul Fraser. The film also stars Toby Kebbell (in his first film appearance) and Gary Stretch.

It was released in the United Kingdom on 1 October 2004 and in the United States on 12 May 2006. Filming took place in the summer of 2003 over the course of three weeks.

== Plot ==
Richard returns to his home town of Matlock, Derbyshire, after serving in the British Army. Richard vows to take revenge on a group of drug dealers who horrifically abused his younger, mentally impaired brother Anthony. Richard antagonizes Herbie, one of the abusers, who does not recognise him at first. Herbie tells his fellow gang members Soz and Tuff about Richard's return, which agitates them. Richard terrorises an inebriated Herbie while wearing a gas mask. While the three go out to confront him, Richard discreetly ransacks the flat and steals their drugs. Sonny, Big Al and Gypsy John are similarly terrorised during the night. The men encounter Richard, who threateningly invites them to come to the farm where he is staying. That evening, while Sonny and the others make plans, Richard slyly bludgeons John to death.

The next morning, the gang go to the farm where Richard is staying with Anthony. Sending in Al to draw Richard out, Sonny attempts to shoot Richard but he misses and kills Al. With no rounds remaining in the rifle, they retreat. The car breaks down and Tuff runs away in a panic. At Sonny's house, the remaining three unwittingly ingest the drugs Richard had stolen and become highly intoxicated. Richard torments and executes Sonny and Soz. He reveals to Herbie that he had previously killed Tuff and stuffed him in a suitcase. He manipulates Herbie into revealing the location of Mark, another gang member who tormented Anthony, before stabbing him to death.

Unlike his former associates, Mark has abandoned crime and lives with his wife and children. When he realises that Richard is coming for him, he confesses to his wife that the gang gave Anthony LSD, tortured and humiliated him in a ruined church and abandoned him. Anthony hanged himself shortly afterwards. Richard abducts Mark and takes him to the place where Anthony died. Mark expresses regret for not interfering with Anthony's abuse. Richard, who callously reveals that he was embarrassed by Anthony, concludes that his revenge mission has turned him into a monster, and forces Mark to stab him to death. Mark stumbles home, sobbing with blood on his hands.

== Cast ==
- Paddy Considine as Richard
- Toby Kebbell as Anthony
- Gary Stretch as Sonny
- Stuart Wolfenden as Herbie
- Neil Bell as Soz
- Paul Sadot as Tuff
- Seamus O'Neil as Big Al
- George Newton as Gypsy John
- Paul Hurstfield as Mark
- Emily Aston as Patti
- Jo Hartley as Marie
- Craig Considine as Craig
- Matt Considine as Matt
- Andrew Shim as Elvis
- Kephas Leroc as K

== Production ==
After completing Once Upon a Time in the Midlands, Shane Meadows had gone on a hiatus. Paddy Considine had made the short film My Wrongs, which was the first project of Warp Films. Considine introduced Meadows to Warp's Mark Herbert and showed him some of their earlier short films. Based on those, Herbert agreed to fund the making of a movie.

Meadows was keen to get back to his short film roots and cowrote the script with Considine and long-time collaborator Paul Fraser. Originally intended to be a black comedy about a heroic social worker based on a real-life event that Considine had come across, the story took a darker turn when Meadows remembered a friend with disabilities who had died when he was young. Taking inspiration from these real-life situations they had experienced and people they had encountered and the feel of exploitation films, Meadows and Considine turned in a story outline originally titled The Skull. There was no definitive script, with most of the scenes and lines existing as a rough draft. As a result, most of the dialogue and set pieces were improvised on set.

Toby Kebbell was cast at short notice after the actor who had originally been intended to play the character of Anthony dropped out due to concerns about playing the learning difficulties realistically. Kebbell filmed his entire role during the final week of shooting. The character was rewritten from an older brother to a younger brother accordingly. Similarly, former boxer Gary Stretch was hired at the eleventh hour after expressing interest in making films in Britain. Dead Man's Shoes was the screen debut for both actors. It was also the first film that Jo Hartley featured in. Emily Aston had appeared on television but Dead Man's Shoes was also her first feature film role.

Because of the nature of low budget film making, numerous other changes from the script were made virtually on the fly. Neil Bell's character was scripted to be killed off first, but because of how well he worked on set, it was decided that another character would die and the scene was rewritten overnight. A violent confrontation between Richard and the gang was also changed to the scene in which Richard threatens Sonny.

Filming took place in and around the town of Matlock, Derbyshire in May 2003, with re-shoots and pick up shots taken in October the same year. The farm where Richard and Anthony stay is located in Bonsall. Darley Dale, Tansley and Riber feature heavily. The ending was shot at Riber Castle. The film took three weeks to shoot. Because of the low budget, the entire film crew and actors were transported in a single minibus.

The Citroën 2CV used in the film was inspired by an acquaintance of Shane Meadows who had a similar car. The 2CV still exists and was recently seen at a Citroën themed car show, albeit having been repainted. The 2CV also featured in the black comedy series Shameless.

== Music ==
The film features music from, among others, Aphex Twin. Gavin Clark and Nick Hemming, both regular collaborators with Shane Meadows, contributed to the soundtrack. Several additional songs written by other artists on Warp Records appear on the film's soundtrack.

=== Soundtrack ===
Dead Man's Shoes

Soundtrack album by various artists
- Released: 4 October 2004
- Length: 77:51
- Label: Warp

The soundtrack album was released by Warp Records in October 2004.

1. Smog – "Vessel in Vain"
2. Calexico – "Untitled II"
3. Calexico – "Untitled III"
4. Adem – "Statued"
5. Calexico – "Ritual Road Map"
6. Laurent Garnier – "Forgotten Thoughts"
7. The Earlies – "Morning Wonder"
8. Richard Hawley – "Steel 2"
9. Clayhill – "Afterlight"
10. Calexico – "Crooked Road and the Briar"
11. Lucky Dragons – "Heartbreaker"
12. Gravenhurst – "The Diver"
13. Cul de Sac – "I Remember Nothing More"
14. P.G. Six – "The Fallen Leaves That Jewel the Ground"
15. Amor Belhom Duo B C – "Pluie Sans Nuages"
16. Aphex Twin – "Nanou 2"
17. M. Ward – "Dead Man"
18. DM & Jemini – "The Only One"

Tracks that appeared in the film but not on the soundtrack album include "Monkey Hair Hide" by The Leisure Society, "A King at Night" by Bonnie "Prince" Billy, "De Profundis" by Arvo Pärt, "Let My Prayer Arise" by Dmitry Bortniansky, sung by the Estonian Philharmonic Chamber Choir, "Chinese Water Python" by Robyn Hitchcock, "Sunny Days" by Position Normal and "The Only One" Featuring. Jemini by Danger Mouse.

== Graphic novel ==
A limited-edition graphic novel adapted and illustrated by Anjan Sarkar and based on the script was published to tie in with the release of the film. The book was Warp's first publishing effort. Sarkar had worked on the storyboards for the movie, as well as those for My Wrongs and used his work as the basis for the adaptation, which expanded certain scenes and ideas beyond those explored in the movie. The book was reissued for Warp Films' tenth anniversary.

== Reception ==
Writing in The Observer, Philip French called the film "A very skillful, superbly edited piece of moviemaking". The Daily Telegraph wrote that the film was "not for the faint hearted". Upon release in the United States, The New York Times stated that the film "had style and the story is told with authority" but otherwise felt it was run of the mill. When released in Australia in October 2006, it was described as "very moralistic" and "thrilling." The film was ranked number 180 in Empire magazine's "201 Greatest Movies of All Time" feature in the March 2006 issue. It also made other appearances in the magazine's 2008 list of the 500 greatest movies of all time, where it was ranked at number 462, and in October 2011, where it came 27th in the "100 Best British Films Ever." In celebration of their 200th issue in October 2012, Total Film named it the twelfth best film of the magazine's lifetime. It was ranked number 92 in Time Out's list of the 100 best British films.

Paddy Considine won Best British Actor at the 2005 Empire Awards, beating, among others, Simon Pegg for Shaun of the Dead and Daniel Craig for Layer Cake. Dead Man's Shoes was nominated for eight British Independent Film Awards. Toby Kebbell was nominated for Best Newcomer while Gary Stretch was nominated for a Best Supporting Actor award at the same ceremony.

On Rotten Tomatoes, the film has an approval rating of 60% based on 48 reviews with an average rating of 6.2/10. The site's critical consensus reads, "Though enhanced by cramped, gritty camerawork, this unsettling look at violence and revenge lacks the provocative edge needed to give it a substantial kick." On Metacritic, the film has a score of 52 out of 100 based on 14 critics, indicating "mixed or average reviews".

== Live re-score ==
On 17 November 2012, as part of Warp Films 10-year anniversary celebrations (WarpFilms10), Dead Man's Shoes was re-scored live at the Magna Science and Adventure Centre in Rotherham by musicians Gavin Clark, Joel Cadbury, Jah Wobble and more. Its popularity led to a follow-up event in London as part of the Warp Films season at BFI Southbank on 29 March 2013 at the Southbank Centre's BFI Sonic Cinema. Featuring Gavin Clark (Clayhill, UNKLE), Joel Cadbury (UNKLE, South), Ali Friend (Clayhill), Ted Barnes (Clayhill), Jeff Wootton, Daisy Palmer (Goldfrapp) and Helen Boulding. All performances feature a special introduction from Paddy Considine.
