= Dave Harper (footballer) =

English footballer

Personal information
- Date of birth: 29 September 1938
- Place of birth: Peckham, London, England
- Date of death: 23 January 2013 (aged 74)
- Place of death: Eastbourne, England
- Position: Midfielder

Senior career*
Years	Team	Apps	(Gls)
1957–1965	Millwall	165	(4)
1965–1967	Ipswich Town	72	(2)
1967	Swindon Town	4	(0)
1967–1971	Leyton Orient	85	(4)
Total		326	(10)
- * Club domestic league appearances and goals

David Harper (29 September 1938 – 23 January 2013) was an English footballer who played as a midfielder in the Football League. He was born in Peckham, London. Married to Jean Harper with whom he had two sons David (aka Frank) and Paul Harper.

His son, Frank Harper, is a British actor whose roles include that of the father of a football-loving teenage girl (played by Keira Knightley) in Bend It Like Beckham (2002).
