= War Book =

- UK film poster
- Directed by: Tom Harper
- Written by: Jack Thorne
- Produced by: Lauren Dark; Tom Harper
- Starring: Adeel Akhtar; Nicholas Burns; Ben Chaplin; Shaun Evans; Kerry Fox; Phoebe Fox; Sophie Okonedo; Antony Sher; Nathan Stewart-Jarrett
- Cinematography: Zac Nicholson
- Edited by: Mark Eckersley
- Music by: Jack C. Arnold
- Production companies: Sixteen Films; Archer's Mark
- Distributed by: K5 International
- Release dates: 13 October 2014 (BFI London Film Festival); 7 August 2015 (United Kingdom)
- Running time: 92 minutes
- Country: United Kingdom
- Language: English

War Book is a 2014 British political drama film directed by Tom Harper and written by Jack Thorne. The film features an ensemble cast, consisting of Adeel Akhtar, Nicholas Burns, Ben Chaplin, Shaun Evans, Kerry Fox, Phoebe Fox, Sophie Okonedo, Antony Sher (In his final film role before his death in 2021), and Nathan Stewart-Jarrett.

== Plot ==
Over the course of three days, eight government officials, a Member of Parliament, and a political appointee participate in a war-game which has taken place regularly among British civil servants since the 1960s, as a way to help them formulate government procedure in the event of nuclear war. In the depicted meetings, set in 2014, the group discusses possible UK policy in the fictional event of a nuclear detonation in Mumbai, India by a Pakistani organisation.

== Cast ==
- Adeel Akhtar as Mo
- Nicholas Burns as James
- Ben Chaplin as Gary
- Shaun Evans as Tom
- Kerry Fox as Maria
- Phoebe Fox as Kate
- Sophie Okonedo as Philippa
- Antony Sher as David
- Nathan Stewart-Jarrett as Austin
- Morgan Walters as Frank

== Premiere and reception ==
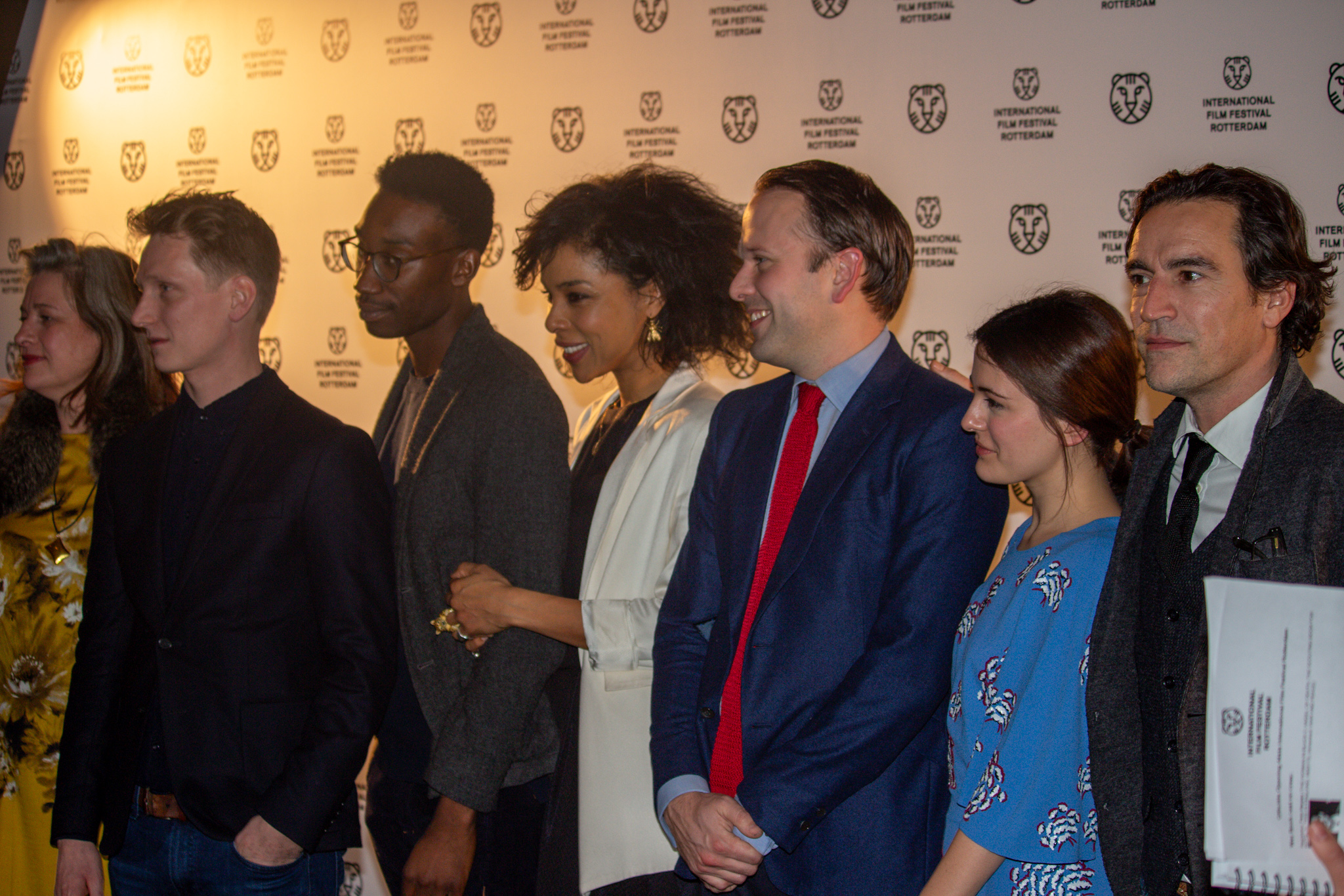
Cast at the IFFR 2015, where it was its opening film

The film was first shown on 13 October 2014, during the London Film Festival. It featured as the opening film of the International Film Festival Rotterdam on 21 January 2015 and saw a limited cinema release on 7 August 2015, and premiered on BBC Four only four days later, on 11 August 2015.

On review aggregator Rotten Tomatoes, the film holds an approval rating of 75% based on 8 reviews, with an average rating of 7.67/10. Variety's Charles Gant found the film's dialogue somewhat theatrical and compared it to Roger Donaldson’s Thirteen Days, which proved that "a talkathon rooted in a historical moment of genuine peril can be far more gripping than any invented drama, and many audiences may find the final act of "War Book" to be risibly paranoid by comparison." The Guardian's Mike McCahill felt that "theatricality looms, but the variation of voices and viewpoints among the expert cast generates a rat-a-tat momentum." The List's Nikki Baughan was much more enthusiastic, comparing it to Sidney Lumet's 1957 classic Twelve Angry Men, stating that "Jack Thorne's remarkable script is a masterclass in slow-burn tension, combining black-and-white facts with the murky greys of human emotion to drive home the fragility of social order in the face of incoming warheads."
