= Small Time (1996 film) =

1996 British comedy-drama film written, directed by and starring Shane Meadows

- DVD cover
- Directed by: Shane Meadows
- Written by: Shane Meadows
- Produced by: Shane Meadows; Dominic Dillon
- Starring: Matt Hand; Dena Smiles; Shane Meadows
- Cinematography: Helene Whitehall
- Edited by: Shane Meadows; David Wilson
- Music by: Gavin Clark
- Production companies: Big Arty Productions; British Film Institute; Intermedia Films
- Distributed by: Mongrel Media (Canada)
- Release dates: 11 September 1996 (Toronto International Film Festival); 31 October 1997 (UK)
- Running time: 60 minutes
- Country: United Kingdom
- Language: English
- Budget: £5,000

Small Time is a 1996 British comedy-drama film written, produced, directed by and starring Shane Meadows in his directorial debut.

== Plot ==
The film follows a group of friends that are small-time criminals in Sneinton, a suburb of Nottingham. The main protagonists are best friends, Jumbo and Malc. At the beginning of the film we hear Jumbo narrating, "We're not into anything heavy. We just rob from the rich and sell it to the poor for half price. We're just small time."

Malc and his partner Kate live next door to Jumbo and his partner Ruby. Malc and Kate can continually hear the domestic abuse in the neighbouring house, but Ruby is quick to defend Jumbo although she does concede that he is bad in bed and tells Kate that she uses a sex aid.

Malc is unhappy with the way his life is going but cannot seem to find a way out of the situation. Kate is unhappy too and pushes Malc to sever ties with the group. Kate attends a yoga class and makes friends with a classmate, Martin, who invites Kate and Malc to his house for the evening. Kate, Malc, Martin and his girlfriend, Elaine are having a good evening until Jumbo turns up uninvited having found out where they were from their babysitter. Malc makes it clear that he doesn't want Jumbo there.

Jumbo later relays this tale to the rest of the gang, who are not impressed with Malc's new attitude. They decide to be nice to him until they have completed an armed robbery, which they need him for, and then cut him out of their circle of friends. Malc is uncomfortable with the robbery but goes along anyway.

They raid a small new age store that sells incense, charms and the like. Malc acts as a look out on the street with Terry, who is driving the getaway van. Whilst the raid is going on, Malc convinces Terry to drive off. Jumbo and the rest of the gang realise that there is no money on the premises. They leave when they hear police sirens, but there is now no getaway van so they have to make a run for it. Meanwhile, Malc has taken the van and is doing a moonlight flit - in broad daylight - with his family. The film ends with Jumbo being apprehended by the police.

As the credits roll we see what's happened to the gang; Willy, Jumbo and Bets are in prison, Lenny gets his comeuppance for his dodgy deals, Mad Terry looking after Malc and Kate's children in Skegness, where they now live. Kate and Malc now run a refreshment hut by the sea.

== Cast ==
- Shane Meadows as "Jumbo"
- Mat Hand as Malcolm "Malc"
- Gena Kawecka as Ruby
- Dena Smiles as Kate
- Jimmy Hynd as Willy
- Leon Lammond as "Bets"
- Tim Cunningham as Lenny "The Fence"
- Domonic Dillon as Terrance "Mad Terrance"
- Mark Armstrong as "Crutch"
- Carlos Barreto as Cuban Chef
- Marcus Rowlands as Martin
- Maria Woolley as Elaine
- Len Hand as Man At Door
- Tanya Myers as Yoga Tutor
- Neil Johnson as Hoover Buyer
- Autumn Lily Smiles as Trudy
- Ellya Kawecka as "Denver"
- Sun Orion Hand as "Baby"
- Jeff Fahey as The Dutchman
