= Journeyman (film) =

- British release poster
- Directed by: Paddy Considine
- Written by: Paddy Considine
- Produced by: Diarmid Scrimshaw
- Starring: Paddy Considine; Jodie Whittaker; Paul Popplewell; Anthony Welsh; Tony Pitts
- Cinematography: Laurie Rose
- Edited by: Pia Di Ciaula
- Music by: Harry Escott
- Production companies: Film4; Inflammable Films
- Distributed by: StudioCanal
- Release dates: 12 October 2017 (London Film Festival); 30 March 2018 (Theatrical)
- Running time: 92 minutes
- Country: United Kingdom
- Language: English

Journeyman is a 2017 British drama film written and directed by Paddy Considine. The film stars Considine and Jodie Whittaker, with Paul Popplewell, Anthony Welsh and Tony Pitts.

== Plot ==
Matty Burton is the ageing Middleweight boxing champion of the world, living a comfortable life with his wife, Emma, and daughter, Mia. He is scheduled to defend his title against the controversial and outspoken Andre Bryte. Bryte is brash and disrespectful towards Burton in the press conference, and continues antagonizing him in subsequent interviews. The resulting match is gruelling for Burton, as he takes several hard shots to the head, but he retains his belt after winning by decision.

Returning home, Burton experiences delayed reactions to the punishment he received in the fight. He begins having severe headaches, and subsequently passes out on his living room floor. Returning from hospital after brain surgery, Matty's personality and physical abilities have deteriorated, and he is suffering with dementia. Despite Emma's best efforts, Matty becomes increasingly difficult to care for; he has violent outbursts, at one point striking her, and even putting Mia in an inactive washing machine to drown out her cries. This prompts Emma to leave him. Distressed by the revelation of who he once was, Matty attempts suicide, but survives his fall into the water and returns to his old gym, from where he is taken to hospital. Matty's friends Richie and Jackie begin helping Matty, ashamed that they didn't visit him during the surgery, and his condition slowly improves. He is later visited by Bryte, who is deeply repentant for what happened. Matty forgives him.

Matty ultimately attends a ceremony dedicated to him, where he gives a speech thanking those who have helped him in his recovery, and stating that he wants to live for his wife and child. Emma later approaches Matty, and the two emotionally reconcile. With his condition greatly improved, Matty returns to the gym as a trainer, his life renewed.

== Cast ==
- Paddy Considine as Matty Burton
- Jodie Whittaker as Emma Burton
- Anthony Welsh as Andre Bryte
- Paul Popplewell as Jackie
- Tony Pitts as Richie

Kell Brook and Steve Bunce have cameos as themselves, while Brendan Ingle plays Robin Burton, the protagonist's father.

== Release ==
The film was released in the UK on 30 March 2018.

== Reception ==
On review aggregator website Rotten Tomatoes, the film holds an approval rating of 85% based on 39 reviews, and an average rating of 6.8/10. The site's consensus reads: "Journeyman finds writer-director-star Paddy Considine gutting out a boxing drama whose familiar narrative contours are countered by an array of powerful performances". Robbie Collin of The Telegraph gave it four out of five stars, dubbing the film 'heartbreaking'. Empire also gave the film four out of five stars, describing Considine as 'astonishing as a broken man attempting to put himself back together'. Guy Lodge of Variety found it a lesser film than Tyrannosaur, but praised the acting.

== Influence ==
Former UFC Middleweight Champion Michael Bisping said watching Journeyman while on a flight, and his desire not to become like the character in the film, led to his retirement from the sport. “It’s been a hell of a ride, it’s been amazing, but I knew watching that movie, I’m like, yeah, this is it, this is the end,” Bisping said. “I can’t do this to my family anymore. I can’t do it to myself. Obviously my eye is in terrible shape, and my good eye, I’m having a couple of issues with that as well. Nobody wants to go blind, and a friend of mine as well said, ‘You know if you went blind, you would give any amount of money in the world and get your sight back,’ and of course you would, so it just isn't worth it.”

== Awards and nominations ==
Year	Group	Award	Result
2017	British Independent Film Awards	Best Actor - Paddy Considine	Nominated
2017	British Independent Film Awards	Best Effects - Luke Dodd	Nominated
2017	British Independent Film Awards	Best Make Up & Hair Design - Nadia Stacey	Nominated
2018	Evening Standard British Film Awards	Best Actress - Jodie Whittaker	Nominated
2018	National Film Awards, UK	Best British Film	Nominated
2018	National Film Awards, UK	Best Actor - Paddy Considine	Nominated
