= Frank Harper =

British actor and film producer

David Frank Harper
- Occupations: Actor; director
- Years active: 1988–present

Frank Harper is an English actor and film producer. He is best known for his "hard man" roles, such as Billy Bright in The Football Factory (2004) and Dog in Lock, Stock and Two Smoking Barrels (1998).

== Career ==
Frank Harper had an early interest in acting and appeared in a play based around football supporters, at the Albany Theatre in Deptford, while he was still at school. He appeared as a white nationalist in South West 9, and as the bank robber in Harry Enfield's film Kevin & Perry Go Large. He was featured in The Streets' music video "Fit but You Know It", and cast as real-life villain Jack Whomes in Rise of the Foot Soldier.

During his career, Harper has appeared on many British TV shows including The Bill, Doctors, Lovejoy and Waking the Dead. He also wrote, directed and starred in the 2012 British film St George's Day.

== Personal life ==
He is an ardent Millwall fan. His father, Dave Harper, played for Millwall between 1957 and 1965; Dave once scored to knock Fulham, then in the First Division, out of the FA Cup.

== Filmography ==
=== Films ===
Year	Film	Role	Notes
1988	For Queen and Country	Mickey	
1990	Tight Trousers	Gip	Short film
1993	In the Name of the Father	Ronnie Smalls	
1997	24 7: Twenty Four Seven	Ronnie Marsh	
1998	Lock, Stock and Two Smoking Barrels	Dog	
1999	A Room for Romeo Brass	Joe Brass	
1999	Snack Related Mishap	The Boss	Short film
1999	Tube Tales	My Father The Liar	Ticket inspector
2000	Kevin & Perry Go Large	Armed robber	
2000	Shiner	Jeff 'Stoney' Stone	
2001	Goodbye Charlie Bright	Tommy's dad	
2001	The Last Minute	Cabbie	
2001	Lucky Break	John Toombes	
2001	South West 9	Douser	
2001	The Search for John Gissing	Dexter	
2002	Club Le Monde	Danny	
2002	Bend It Like Beckham	Alan Paxton	
2004	The Calcium Kid	Clive Connelly	
2004	The Football Factory	Billy Bright	Also associate producer
2006	This Is England	Lenny	
2007	Dolphins	Legend	
2007	Time Gentlemen Please	Landlord	Short film
2007	Rise of the Footsoldier	Jack Whomes	
2007	Permanent Vacation	Eric Bury	
2009	Dubplate Drama	Sgt Richards	
2009	Unarmed But Dangerous	Barry	Also known as Kung Fu Flid
2010	Vendetta	Davy	Short film
2010	Stained	Matt	Short film
2010	Blood Army	Alfie	Also producer
2010	Just For the Record	Jim	
2010	StreetDance 3D	Fred	
2010	The Nephillim	Husband	
2011	Screwed	Deano	
2011	Victim	Colin	
2012	St. George's Day	Micky Mannock	Also writer and director
2013	The Nephilim	Husband	
2020	Silent Night	Caddy	
2021	Nemesis	Richard Morgan	
2023	Bury the Dogs	Tosh	

=== TV ===
Year	Show	Role	Notes
1990	Desmond's	The Brute	1 episode: "Kung You"
1990	Birds of a Feather	Billy	1 episode: "Muesli"
1992	Fool's Gold: The Story of the Brink's-Mat Robbery	Brother's minder	
1993	Between the Lines	Trevor Bull	2 episodes: "Big Boys Rules" (Parts 1 & 2)
1994	Pie in the Sky	Security Guard	1 episode: "Endangered Species"
1994	Lovejoy	Harry Whymark	1 episode: "Double Edged Sword"
1995	The Governor	Nelson	2 episodes
1996	Kavanagh QC	Taxi Driver	1 episode: "A Sense of Loss"
1997	The Missing Postman	BBC security man	
1998	The Bill	Andy Bartlett	1 episode: "Spray"
1998	The Jump	Anthony Calder	3 episodes
1999	Boyz Unlimited	Nigel Gacey	
1999	Tube Tales	Station guard	
1999–2000	Second Sight	DS Finch	
2000	Sunburn	Colin Daley	1 episode: "2.7"
2000	Other People's Children	Matthew	2 episodes
2002	Mr Towler	Mr Towler	
2003	TLC	Frank Briggs	1 episode: "The Wrong Leg"
2003	Keen Eddie	Ray Boskins	1 episode: "Eddie Loves Baseball"
2005	Doctors	Karl Naismith	1 episode: "Credit Limit"
2005	Rose and Maloney	DS Mike Glover	1 episode: "2.3"
2005	Waking the Dead	John Tate	1 episode: "Subterraneans"
2008	He Kills Coppers	DI Ernie Franklin	
2008	Matroesjka's 2	Tom Gallagher	4 episodes
2009	Collision	Derek	3 episodes
2013	Ripper Street	Silas Duggan	
2014	House of Fools	Ben Gunn	1 episode
