= Lauren Dark =

British film producer

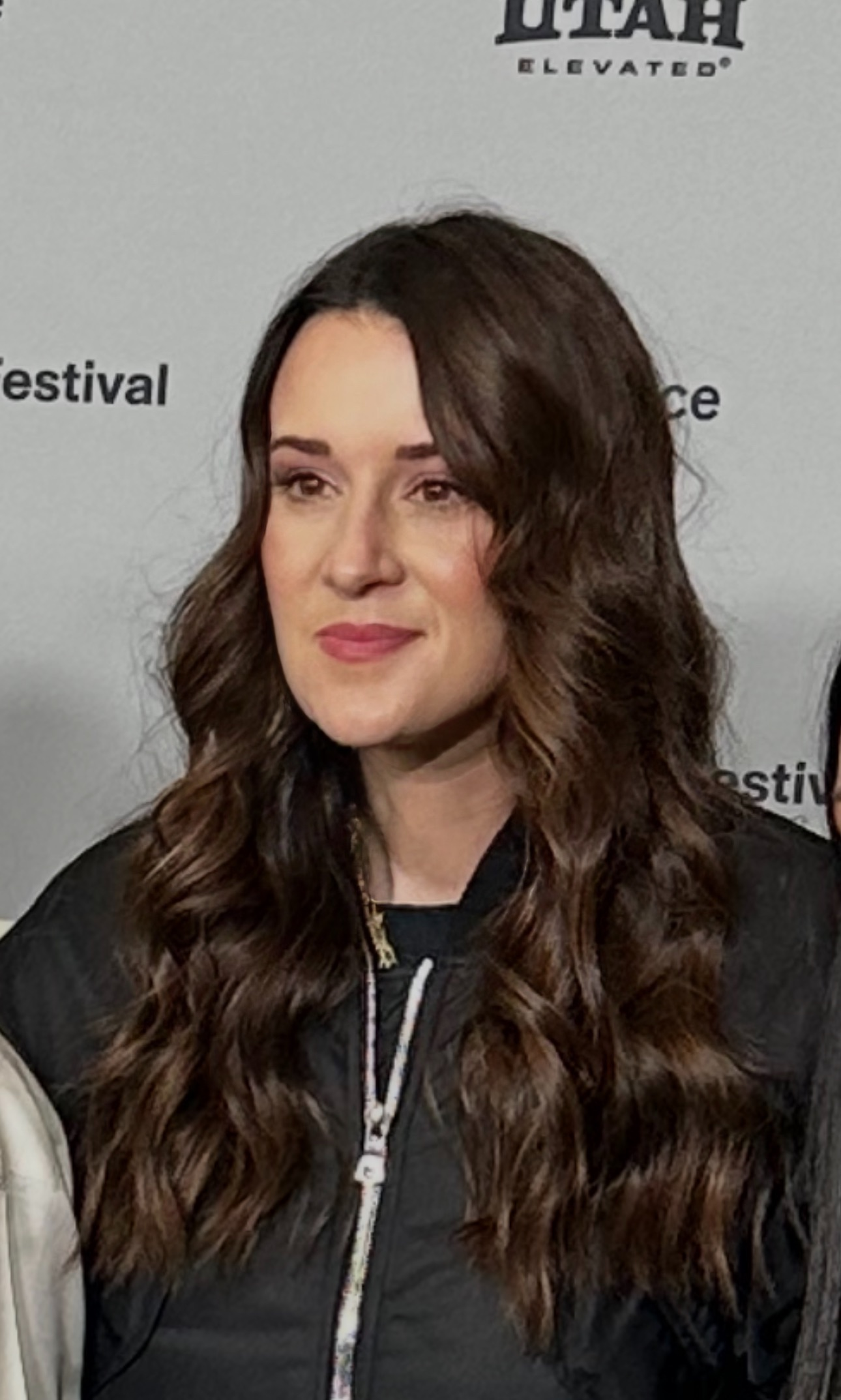
Lauren Dark at the Sundance Film Festival 2026

Lauren Emily Dark (born January 1984) is a British film producer. She produced Beast the debut film of director Michael Pearce and was nominated for two BAFTA awards. She won the BAFTA for Outstanding Debut by a Writer, Director or Producer in 2019.

In 2021, she left Film4 and co-founded the London-based production company Aluna Entertainment with Vanessa Kirby; which has a first look deal with Netflix. Dark worked at Ken Loach and Rebecca O'Brien's production company Sixteen Films for five years while there she produced the political thriller War Book. In March 2025 Lauren Dark founded UK production Company Unified with Aftersun Producer Amy Jackson.

== Filmography ==
=== Film ===
Year	Film	Credit	Ref
2014	War Book	Producer	
2017	Beast (2017 film)	Producer	
2020	The Father		
2021	Laika (VR Short)	Executive Producer	
2021	Passing	Executive Producer	
2021	Censor	Executive Producer	
2022	A Gaza Weekend		
2022	The Son	Executive Producer	
2022	Nezouh	Executive Producer	
2022	Enys Men	Executive Producer	
2022	Thunder	Executive Producer	
2024	Night Always Comes	Producer	
2025	Chork	Producer	
2025	The Disciple	Producer	

=== Television ===
Year	Title	Credits	Ref
2020	A Response To Your Message	Executive Producer	Television Special
2021	Foresight	Executive Producer	
