= TwentyFourSeven (film) =

- Directed by: Shane Meadows
- Written by: Paul Fraser; Shane Meadows
- Produced by: Imogen West
- Starring: Bob Hoskins
- Cinematography: Ashley Rowe
- Edited by: William Diver
- Music by: Boo Hewerdine; Neil MacColl
- Production companies: BBC Films; Scala Films
- Distributed by: Guild Pathé Cinema
- Release dates: 31 August 1997 (Venice Film Festival); 3 April 1998 (United Kingdom)
- Running time: 96 minutes
- Country: United Kingdom
- Language: English
- Box office: $0.8 million

TwentyFourSeven is a 1997 British sports drama film directed and written by Shane Meadows and starring Bob Hoskins. It was co-written by frequent Meadows collaborator Paul Fraser.

== Plot ==
In a typical English working-class town, the juveniles have nothing more to do than hang around in gangs. Alan Darcy, a highly motivated man with the same kind of youth experience, tries to get the young people off the street and into doing something they can believe in, boxing. He opens a training facility which is accepted gratefully by them and the gangs merge together into a group of friends. Darcy organises a public fight for them to prove what they have learned. A training camp with hiking tours into the mountains of Wales forges the group into a tightly knit club society. With the day of the fight drawing closer, the young boxers get more and more excited.

== Cast ==
- Bob Hoskins as Alan Darcy
- Danny Nussbaum as Tim
- Justin Brady as Gadget
- James Hooton as Wolfman Knighty
- Darren O. Campbell as Daz
- Karl Collins as Stuart
- Johann Myers as Benny
- Jimmy Hynd as Meggy
- Mat Hand as Wesley Fagash
- James Corden as Tonka
- Frank Harper as Ronnie Marsh
- Bruce Jones as Tim's Dad
- Jo Bell as Jo

== Reception ==
The film received very favourable press on release in the UK, including five star reviews from publications including Empire. It subsequently performed well at UK awards ceremonies. At the 1998 BAFTA Awards, it was nominated for the Alexander Korda Award for Best British Film. At the 1998 British Independent Film Awards, Meadows won the Douglas Hickox Award and the film was nominated in the Best British Independent Film category. Meadows won the FIPRESCI Prize at the 1997 Venice Film Festival.

The film grossed £235,126 in the United Kingdom, $212,000 in Australia, $92,000 in the United States and $70,000 in Italy, Germany and Spain for a worldwide total in excess of $767,000.
