= Once Upon a Time in the Midlands =

- Theatrical release poster
- Directed by: Shane Meadows
- Written by: Paul Fraser; Shane Meadows
- Produced by: Andrea Calderwood
- Starring: Robert Carlyle; Rhys Ifans; Kathy Burke; Ricky Tomlinson; Shirley Henderson; Andrew Shim
- Cinematography: Brian Tufano
- Edited by: Peter Beston; Trevor Waite
- Music by: John Lunn
- Production companies: FilmFour; Film Council; Senator Film Produktion; Emmi; Slate Films; Big Arty
- Distributed by: Pathé Distribution; FilmFour Distribution (United Kingdom); Senator Filmverleih (Germany)
- Release date: 6 September 2002
- Running time: 104 minutes
- Countries: United Kingdom; Germany
- Language: English

Once Upon a Time in the Midlands is a 2002 British romantic comedy film directed by Shane Meadows, and co-written with Paul Fraser. The film stars Robert Carlyle, Rhys Ifans, Kathy Burke, Ricky Tomlinson, Shirley Henderson and Andrew Shim. It is set in Nottingham, in the East Midlands region of England.

== Plot ==
Set in Nottinghamshire, Dek (Rhys Ifans) proposes to his girlfriend Shirley (Shirley Henderson) on TV. When Jimmy (Robert Carlyle), "the great love of her life" and father of her daughter Marlene (Finn Atkins), sees this, he returns in an attempt to win back her heart. However, after deserting his friends in Scotland during an unsuccessful robbery of some clowns, his friends turn against him and come to the Midlands to try to track him down. In the end, Shirley refuses to go with Jimmy and professes her love for Dek; likewise, Marlene refuses to have anything to do with Jimmy, and accepts Dek as her father figure.

== Cast ==
- Robert Carlyle as Jimmy, Carol's foster brother, Shirley's ex-husband and Marlene's father
- Vanessa Feltz as herself
- Ricky Tomlinson as Charlie, Carol's estranged husband
- Kathy Burke as Carol, Jimmy's foster sister
- Vicki Patterson as Audience Guest
- Shirley Henderson as Shirley, Jimmy's ex-wife and Marlene's mother
- Finn Atkins as Marlene, Jimmy and Shirley's daughter
- Kelly Thresher as Donna, Carol's daughter
- Rhys Ifans as Dek, Shirley's boyfriend
- Andrew Shim as Donut, Donna's boyfriend
- Ryan Bruce as Emerson, Carol and Charlie's son and Lake and Donna's brother
- Eliot Otis Brown Walters as Lake, Carol and Charlie's son and Emerson and Donna's brother
- Anthony Strachan as Jumbo (credited as Antony Strachan)
- David McKay as Dougy (credited as David Mckay)
- James Cosmo as Billy

== Awards ==
Gijón International Film Festival 2002

- Nominated: Best Feature (Grand Prix Asturias) – Shane Meadows
