= Peter Mullan =

Scottish actor and filmmaker (born 1959)

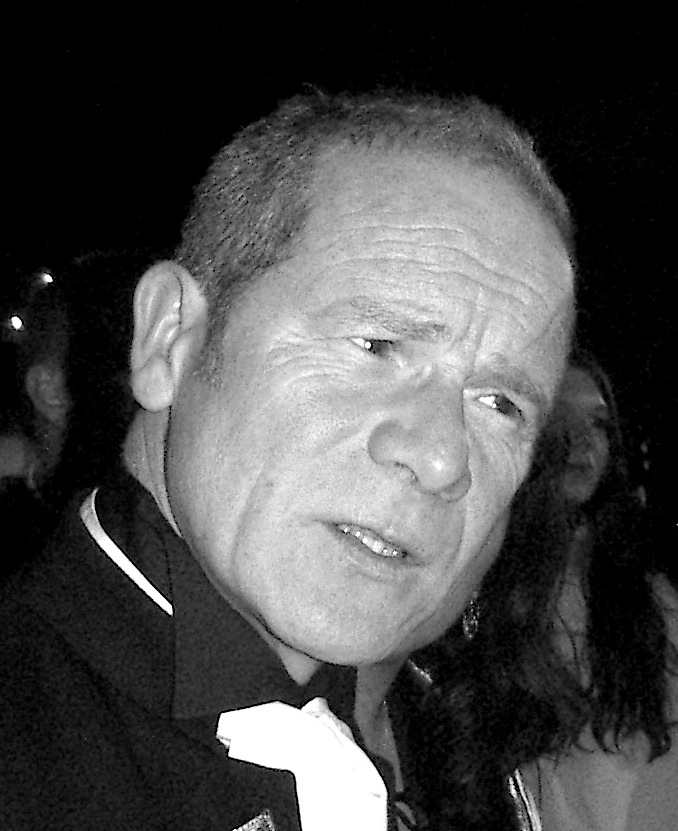
- Mullan in 2005
- Born: 2 November 1959 (age 67); Peterhead, Aberdeenshire, Scotland
- Occupations: Actor; filmmaker
- Years active: 1988–present
- Spouse: Ann Swan (m. 1989; div. 2006)
- Children: 4

Peter Mullan (/ˈmʌlən/; born 2 November 1959) is a Scottish actor and filmmaker. His credits include Riff-Raff (1991), Shallow Grave (1994), Braveheart (1995), Trainspotting (1996), My Name Is Joe (1998), The Claim (2000), Session 9 (2001), Neds (2010), War Horse (2011), The Fixer (2008), Top of the Lake (2013), Mum (2016–2019), Ozark (2017–2018), Westworld (2018–2020), Cursed (2020), The North Water (2021), The Underground Railroad (2021), The Lord of the Rings: The Rings of Power (2022–2024), After the Party (2023), Baghead (2023) and I Swear (2025).

He won a Golden Lion at 59th Venice International Film Festival for his direction of The Magdalene Sisters (2002).

== Early life ==
Peter Mullan was born in Peterhead, Aberdeenshire, Scotland, the son of Patricia (a nurse) and Charles Mullan (a lab technician at Glasgow University). The seventh of eight children, Mullan was brought up in a working class Roman Catholic family. They later moved to Mosspark, a district in Glasgow. Mullan's father, an alcoholic, became increasingly tyrannical and abusive; he died from lung cancer when Mullan was 17.

For a brief period, Mullan was a member of a street gang while at secondary school, and worked as a bouncer in a number of south-side pubs. He was homeless for short periods at the ages of 15 and 18.

Mullan went on to the University of Glasgow to study economic history and drama, and where he also began acting on stage.

== Career ==
=== Acting ===
Mullan continued stage acting after graduation. He had roles in films alongside actors such as Robert Carlyle in Riff-Raff (1991), with Mel Gibson in Braveheart (1995), and with Ewan McGregor in Danny Boyle's Shallow Grave (1994) and Trainspotting (1996).

Mullan's role as a recovering alcoholic in My Name Is Joe (1998) won him the Best Actor Award at the 1998 Cannes Film Festival.

As a director, his film, Orphans (1998), won awards at the Venice Film Festival 1998 and Festival du Film de Paris 1999.

He won the World Dramatic Special Jury Prize for Breakout Performances at 2011 Sundance Film Festival for his work on Paddy Considine's Tyrannosaur (2011).

Mullan has appeared as supporting or guest actor in numerous cult movies, including Session 9 (2002),Young Adam (2003), Children of Men (2006), Harry Potter and the Deathly Hallows – Part 1 (2010), and War Horse (2011).

In television, he played a lead role in the 2008 ITV series The Fixer. Mullan appeared in Gerard Lee's and Jane Campion's 2013 miniseries Top of the Lake as Matt Mitcham, head of the Mitcham family and father of Tui Mitcham, whose disappearance is the main topic of the series. He was nominated for a Primetime Emmy Award for his work in the series. From 2016 to 2019, he starred in the BBC Two sitcom Mum, and from 2017 to 2018, Mullan appeared in the first two seasons of the Netflix series Ozark. In 2018 and 2020, he starred in the second and third season of HBO's Westworld, in a recurring and guest capacity respectively. Also in 2020, he starred in the first season of the Netflix series Cursed.

Mullan appeared in the 2021 miniseries The North Water and The Underground Railroad. He also starred as Dwarf king Durin III in the Amazon Prime Video series The Lord of the Rings: The Rings of Power, which premiered in 2022.

In 2023, he starred in the New Zealand drama series After the Party, and alongside Freya Allan in Baghead (2023).

In March 2026, it was announced that Mullan had been cast as Ser Eustace Osgrey in the second season of A Knight of the Seven Kingdoms.

=== Directing ===
Mullan is an arthouse movie director. In 2002, he returned to directing and screenwriting with the controversial film The Magdalene Sisters, based on life in an Irish Magdalene asylum. He won a Golden Lion at 59th Venice International Film Festival for the film, listed by many critics among the best films of 2003 and nominated for BAFTA Award for Best British Film, and European Film Award for best film.

He also won a Golden Shell at San Sebastián International Film Festival for Neds (2010).

He won top prizes both for acting (Cannes Best Actor award for My Name Is Joe) and for the best film (Golden Lion for The Magdalene Sisters) at major European film festivals.

== Personal life ==
Mullan married Ann Swan, an actress and scriptwriter, in 1989; they divorced in 2006. He has four children – three with Swan, including one son with autism, and one with former girlfriend, activist Robina Qureshi. He is in a relationship with New Zealand actress Robyn Malcolm, whom he met while filming Top of the Lake in 2013.

A self-described Marxist, Mullan continues to support socialist causes and was a leading figure in the left-wing theatre movement that blossomed in Scotland during the Margaret Thatcher and John Major Conservative governments in the 1980s and early to mid-1990s. These included stints with the 7:84 and Wildcat Theatre companies. An outspoken critic of Tony Blair and Gordon Brown’s New Labour governments, he told The Guardian "the TUC and the Labour Party sold us [the working class] out big style, unashamedly so". Ahead of the 1999 Scottish Parliament election, Mullan pledged support for the new Scottish Socialist Party and their leader Tommy Sheridan. Mullan took part in a 2006 occupation of the Glasgow offices of the UK Immigration Service, protesting against the UKIS's "dawn raid" tactics when deporting failed asylum seekers.

In January 2009, Mullan joined other actors in protesting against the BBC's refusal to screen a Disasters Emergency Committee appeal for Gaza. They told BBC director general Mark Thompson: "Like millions of others, we are absolutely appalled at the decision to refuse to broadcast the appeal. We will never work for the BBC again unless this disgraceful decision is reversed. We will urge others from our profession and beyond to do likewise." Mullan appeared in an adaptation of Iain Banks's novel Stonemouth after the BBC aired a DEC appeal for Gaza in late 2014.

Mullan was a supporter of the Yes Scotland campaign in the 2014 Scottish independence referendum. In 2015, he criticised the BBC for "horrendous bias" against the Yes campaign and told the Radio Times that "to see the BBC used as a political cudgel against a legitimate democratic movement ... really broke my heart."

In September 2025, Mullan was attacked in Glasgow while attempting to intervene in an assault; the assailant was subsequently jailed for 18 months.

== Filmography ==
=== Film ===
Year	Title	Role	Notes	Ref.
1988	The Steamie	Andy		
1990	The Big Man	Vince		
1991	Riff-Raff	Jake	European Film Award for Best European Film	
1992	Sealladh	Sim	Short film	
1993	Close	Vincent	Short film; also writer and director	
1994	Shallow Grave	Andy		
1995	Fridge	-	Short film, writer and director	
1995	Good Day for the Bad Guys	John	Short film, also writer and director	
1995	Narance	Uncle Josef		
1995	Braveheart	Veteran		
1996	Trainspotting	Johnny "Mother Superior" Swan		
1997	Poor Angels	Gordon	Short film	
1997	Fairy Tale: A True Story	Sergeant Farmer		
1998	Duck	Mick	Short film	
1998	My Name Is Joe	Joe Kavanagh	Cannes Award for Best Actor	
1998	Orphans	-	Writer and director	
1999	Miss Julie	Jean		
1999	The Escort	Patricia's Husband		
2000	Ordinary Decent Criminal	Stevie		
2000	The Claim	Daniel Dillon		
2001	Session 9	Gordon Fleming		
2002	The Magdalene Sisters	Mr. O'Connor	Also writer and director Winner of Golden Lion	
2003	Young Adam	Les Gault		
2003	Kiss of Life	John		
2004	Out of This World	Jim	Original title: Kono yo no sotoe - Club Shinchugun	
2004	Criminal	William Hannigan		
2004	Blinded	Francis Black		
2004	Waves	Him	Short film	
2005	On a Clear Day	Frank Redmond		
2006	Cargo	Brookes		
2006	Children of Men	Syd		
2006	True North	Riley		
2007	The Last Legion	Odoacer		
2007	Dog Altogether	Joseph	Short film	
2007	Boy A	Terry		
2008	Stone of Destiny	Harris Hamilton, Ian's Father		
2009	King Bastard	Granddad	Short film	
2009	Connolly	James Connolly		
2010	The Neighbours	Ernest	Short film	
2010	Harry Potter and the Deathly Hallows – Part 1	Death Eater Corban Yaxley		
2010	Neds	Mr. McGill	Also writer and director Winner of Golden Shell	
2011	Tyrannosaur	Joseph	World Cinema Special Jury Prize: Dramatic (Male)	
2011	Long Distance Information	Jack	Short film	
2011	War Horse	Ted Narracott		
2012	The Man Inside	Gordon Sinclair		
2013	Sunshine on Leith	Robert 'Rab' Henshaw		
2013	The Liability	Peter		
2013	Welcome to the Punch	Roy Edwards		
2014	Hercules	General Sitacles		
2015	Sunset Song	John Guthrie		
2015	Hector	Hector McAdam		
2016	Edith	Jake	Short film	
2016	Tommy's Honour	Old Tom Morris		
2017	Hostiles	Lt. Col. Ross McCowan		
2018	Pearl	Al		
2018	The Vanishing	Thomas		
2018	Mowgli: Legend of the Jungle	Akela (voice)	Voice and motion capture	
2019	Chips	Chips (voice)	Short film	
2020	Fatbaws	Unknown	Short film	
2020	Marionette	Dr. McVittie		
2021	Don vs Lightning	Don	Short film	
2022	The Hanging Sun	Dad		
2023	Baghead	Owen Lark		
2025	I Swear	Tommy Trotter	Completed	
2026	The Fall of Sir Douglas Weatherford	Kenneth		
2026	Borges and Me	George Mackay Brown		
2026	Elsinore	Jack		
TBA	No Way Off †	TBA	Filming	

=== Television ===
Year	Title	Role	Notes	Ref.
1988	The Steamie	Andy	Television film	
1990	Your Cheatin' Heart	Tonto	Mini-series; Episodes 3–5	
1990	Taggart	Peter Lewis / Peter Latimer	Series 5, Episode 4: "Love Knot", and Series 6, Episode 7: "Rogue's Gallery"	
1991	Jute City	Mallet	Episodes 1–3	
1992	Rab C. Nesbitt	Peter the Warlock	Series 2, Episode 6: "Life Has Meaning"	
1993	Encounters	Willy	Series 2; Episode 3: "Opium Eaters"	
1993	Seeker Reaper	George Campbell Hay	Bilingual drama about the life of Scottish poet George Campbell Hay (1915–1984)	
1994	The Priest and the Pirate	Billy Hill	Television films	
1995	Ruffian Hearts	Chez	Television films	
1995	Harry	Jimmy	Series 2, Episode 6	
1996	Nightlife	Billy	Television film	
1997	The Longest Memory	Sanders Sr.	Television film. Whitbread First Novel Award for First Novel	
1997	Bogwoman	Barry	Television films	
2003	This Little Life	Neonatologist	Television films	
2003	Richard & Judy	Himself	Series 2; Episode 92	
2004	Shoebox Zoo	Michael Scot	Recurring role. Series 1; 12 episodes	
2005	Sunday Morning Shootout	Himself	Series 2; Episode 15	
2006	Seanchaí	Calgach	Episode 3: "An Triall"	
2007	British Film Forever	Himself	Mini-series; Episode 3: "Hardship, Humour and Heroes: The Story of British Realism"	
2007	The Trial of Tony Blair	Gordon Brown	Television film	
2008–2009	The Fixer	Lenny Douglas	Recurring role. Series 1 & 2; 12 episodes	
2009	Red Riding: 1974	Martin Laws	Television films	
2009	Red Riding: 1980	Martin Laws	Television films	
2009	Red Riding: 1983	Martin Laws	Television films	
2009	Scotland on Screen	Himself / Actor / Director	Television films	
2012	The Fear	Richie Beckett	Mini-series; Episodes 1–4	
2013	Top of the Lake	Matt Mitcham	Series 1; Episodes 1–7; Nominated – AACTA Award for Best Guest or Supporting Actor in a Television Drama; Nominated – Critics' Choice Television Award for Best Movie/Miniseries Supporting Actor; Nominated – Primetime Emmy Award for Outstanding Supporting Actor in a Miniseries or a Movie	
2014	Olive Kitteridge	Jim O'Casey	HBO mini-series; Episodes 1–3	
2014–2017	Lily's Driftwood Bay	Captain Salty Dog (voice)	Series 1 & 2; 3 episodes	
2015	Stonemouth	Don Murston	Mini-series; Parts 1 & 2	
2016	Quarry	The Broker	Episodes 1–8	
2016–2019	Mum	Michael	Recurring role. Series 1–3; 18 episodes	
2017	Gunpowder	Father Henry Garnet	Mini-series; Episodes 1–3	
2017–2018	Ozark	Jacob Snell	Recurring role. Series 1 & 2; 20 episodes	
2018, 2020	Westworld	James Delos	Series 2 & 3; 4 episodes	
2020	Cursed	Father Carden	Recurring role. 9 episodes	
2021	The Underground Railroad	Ridgeway Senior	Mini-series; 5 episodes	
2021	The North Water	Priest	Episodes 4 & 5: "The Devils of the Earth" and "To Live Is to Suffer"	
2022	Skint	Donny	Episode 6: "The Taking of Balgrayhill Street"	
2022	Chivalry	Fraser Schwartz	Episode 3	
2022–2024	The Lord of the Rings: The Rings of Power	King Durin III	Series 1 & 2; 9 episodes	
2023	Liaison	Richard Banks	Episodes 1–6	
2023	Payback	Cal Morris	Episodes 1–6	
2023	After the Party	Phil	Episodes 1–6	
2025	The Bombing of Pan Am 103	DCS John Orr	Mini-series; episodes 1–4	
2025	Outlander: Blood of My Blood	Red Jacob MacKenzie		
2026	Steal	Sir Toby Gould	Series 1, Episode 4	
TBA	A Knight of the Seven Kingdoms †	Ser Eustace Osgrey	Season 2	

=== Music video appearances ===
Year	Title	Artist	Ref.
2013	"The Conversation"	Texas	
