= Paddy Considine =

English actor, director, screenwriter, and musician (born 1973)

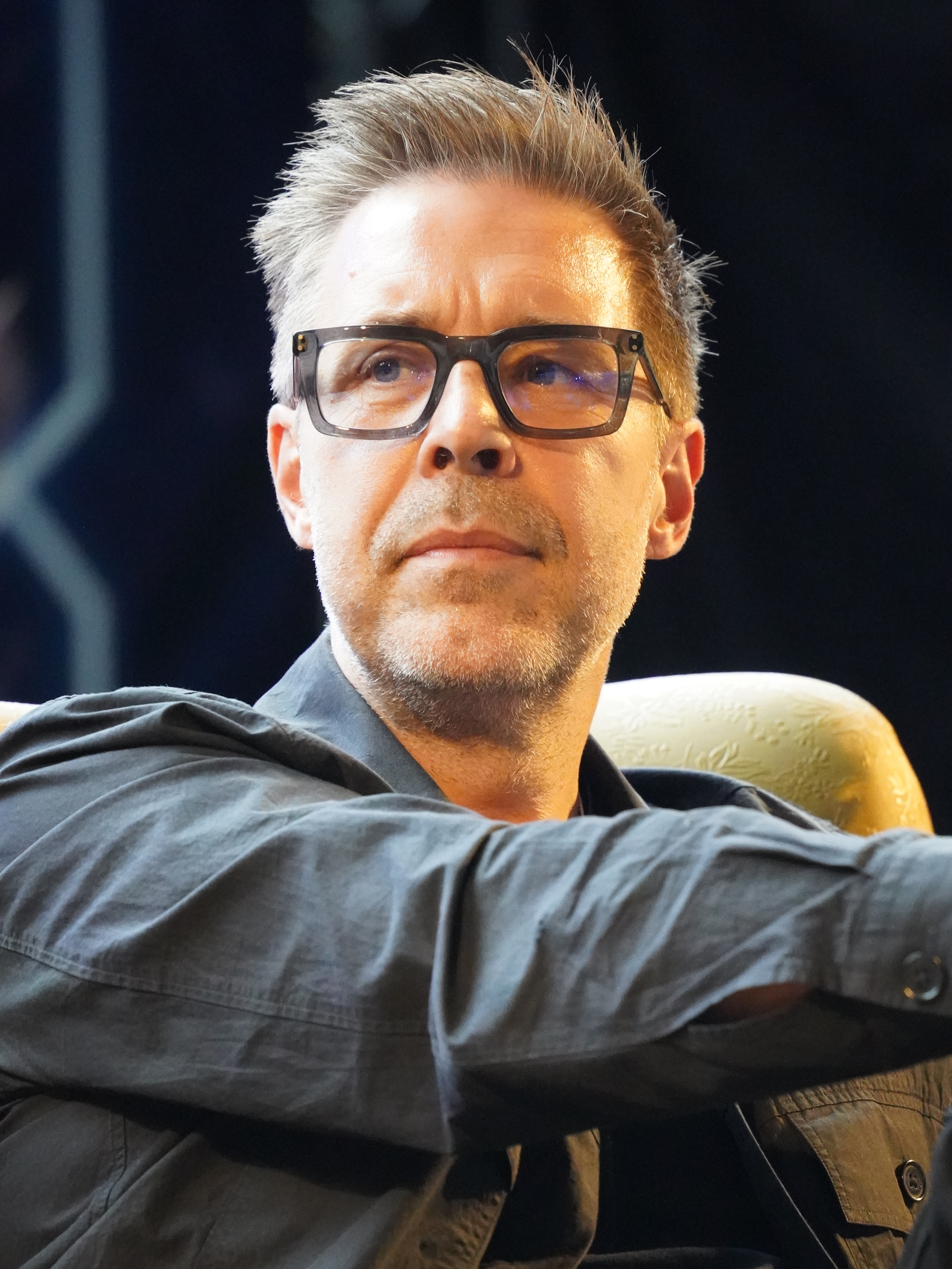
- Considine in 2023
- Born: Patrick George Considine; 5 September 1973 (age 53); Burton upon Trent, England
- Education: University of Brighton (BA)
- Occupations: Actor; director; screenwriter; musician
- Years active: 1999–present
- Spouse: Shelley Insley (m. 2002)
- Children: 3

Patrick George Considine (born 5 September 1973) is an English actor, director, screenwriter and musician. He is known for playing antiheroes in independent films. He has received two British Academy Film Awards, three Evening Standard British Film Awards, British Independent Film Awards, and a Silver Lion for Best Short Film at the 2007 Venice Film Festival.

His first major onscreen appearance was in his first collaboration with filmmaker/director Shane Meadows, A Room for Romeo Brass (1999), and he then played Alfie in Paweł Pawlikowski's Last Resort (2000). Other credits include Doctor Sleep (2002), 24 Hour Party People (2002), In America (2003), My Summer of Love (2004), and Dead Man's Shoes (2004), winning the 2005 Empire Award for Best British Actor and a nomination for the BIFA for Best Actor. He wrote and directed Dog Altogether (2007), winning a BAFTA Award for Best Short Film, and its 2011 feature film adaptation Tyrannosaur which won BAFTA for Outstanding Debut by a British Writer, Director or Producer. He directed and starred in Journeyman.

On stage, Considine received Olivier Awards and Tony Award nominations as Best Actor in 2018 and 2019 for his performances in The Ferryman at the Royal Court Theatre, at the Gielgud Theatre, and at the Bernard B. Jacobs Theatre on Broadway. On television, Considine has been lead in Pu-239 (2006), My Zinc Bed (2008), Red Riding (2009), Informer (2018), and The Suspicions of Mr Whicher series of television films (2013–2014). Other television credits include Peaky Blinders (2016), The Outsider (2020), The Third Day (2020), MobLand (2025–), and most notably he played a lead role as King Viserys I Targaryen in House of the Dragon (2022–2024).

== Early life and education ==
Considine was born in Burton upon Trent, Staffordshire, where he still resides. He was the youngest of six children, and grew up with his brother and four sisters in a council estate in Winshill, a village of Burton. His father, Martin Joseph Considine, was Irish. Considine has said that his father (who died in 2006) did not work and had a reputation on the estate for being violent.

Considine attended, among other schools, Abbot Beyne Senior School and Burton College. In 1990, he enrolled to do a National Diploma in Performing Arts at Burton College, where he first met Shane Meadows.

In 1994, Considine moved away to study photography at the University of Brighton. While there he studied under social documentarian Paul Reas, who described one project, portraits of Considine's parents in their house in Winshill, as "fucking brilliant". At one point, Considine was threatened with expulsion, but graduated with a first-class BA.

== Career ==
=== Acting ===
After graduating from university, Meadows cast Considine in several short films, as well as his second film, A Room for Romeo Brass (1999). Considine, in his screen debut, played the disturbed character Morell. Considine's performance in the film led to Paweł Pawlikowski casting him in his first starring role in Last Resort (2000). Considine played the lead role as love-struck misfit Alfie, for which he won the Best Actor award at the Thessaloniki Film Festival. Considine increased his profile during the early to mid-2000s with supporting and starring roles in cult films such as 24 Hour Party People and In America.

In 2004, Considine starred in what was then the most significant role of his career, as Richard in Meadows' revenge film Dead Man's Shoes (2004), a film he cowrote and for which he won the Best British Actor Award at the 2005 Empire Awards. In the same year, he starred in My Summer of Love, his second film with director Paweł Pawlikowski. Both films were recognised on the award circuit, where Considine earned five nominations and two wins. The following year, Considine played Frank Thorogood (the suspected murderer of Rolling Stones co-founder Brian Jones) in Stoned (2005). It was around this time that Considine earned his reputation as a popular portrayer of cinema villains, antiheroes, and darker characters. 2005 also saw the release of Considine's second Hollywood film, Cinderella Man.

Considine appeared in the Spanish thriller Bosque de Sombras (2006). It was during the filming of this that Considine penned what later became his debut short, Dog Altogether. Considine claims that it was his co-star Gary Oldman who gave him the confidence to make the film, which led to him thanking Oldman during his BAFTA acceptance speech. In 2006, he starred in Pu-239 as Timofey Berezin, a worker at a Russian nuclear facility who gets exposed to a lethal dose of radiation. In 2007, Considine landed roles in two popular big-budget films; the third film in the Bourne Trilogy film series, The Bourne Ultimatum, in which he played newspaper reporter Simon Ross, and Hot Fuzz, in which he had his first comedic role as DS Andy Wainwright. In 2008, Considine starred in the TV film for BBC / HBO My Zinc Bed. In 2009, he starred as Peter Hunter in the Channel 4 miniseries Red Riding: 1980, based on the novels by David Peace, and another collaboration with Meadows, Le Donk & Scor-zay-zee, a film which was unscripted, adlibbed, and filmed in five days at a cost of £48,000, and which premiered at the Edinburgh International Film Festival.

In 2011, Considine starred in a film adaptation of Joe Dunthorne's book Submarine, which Richard Ayoade wrote and directed. Also in 2011, Considine appeared as Porter Nash in the adaptation of the Ken Bruen novel Blitz, as well as starring as Jack Whicher in The Suspicions of Mr Whicher, written by Helen Edmundson and Neil McKay. In the same year, Considine was briefly reunited with one of his A Room for Romeo Brass co-stars, BAFTA-winning actress Vicky McClure. The two shared the screen in a television advert to promote "Films for Life Season". The ad was shot over two days in Spain.

He has appeared in several music videos, most notably "God Put A Smile Upon Your Face" (2002) by Coldplay and Moloko's "Familiar Feeling" (2003), as well as the Arctic Monkeys track "Leave Before the Lights Come On" (2006), for which he wrote the video.

Considine starred in The World's End, as one of the "Five Musketeers" reattempting an "epic" pub crawl. Considine previously worked with the cast and crew on Hot Fuzz (2007). The film was released in the United Kingdom on 19 July 2013, and the United States on 23 August 2013. In August 2015, Considine confirmed that he was writing the screenplay for the film Journeyman, in which he also starred. It is an adaptation of non-fiction novel The Years of the Locust by Jon Hotten, the true story of a sociopathic boxing promoter, Fat Rick Parker, and his doomed relationship with his naive fighter, Tim Anderson. Considine is also writing a film from a ghost story called The Leaning, with plans to direct both films. He will continue to work with Shane Meadows on King of the Gypsies, a biopic of bare-knuckle fighter Bartley Gorman, whom Considine met and became friends with whilst working as a photographer. In 2015, Considine was cast along Glenn Close and Gemma Arterton in the UK zombie film in The Girl with All the Gifts, based on the 2014 novel The Girl with All the Gifts by M. R. Carey.

In April 2017, Considine made his professional stage debut in The Ferryman at the Royal Court Theatre, ahead of a transfer to the Gielgud Theatre in the West End. The production transferred to the Bernard B. Jacobs Theatre on Broadway, beginning previews on 2 October 2018. The play, which went on to win four Tony Awards, closed on 7 July 2019. For his performance as Quinn Carney, Considine gained nominations for best actor at both the Olivier Awards and The Tony Awards.

In 2020, he portrayed Mr Martin in the HBO miniseries The Third Day alongside Jude Law. In August 2022, Considine began appearing as King Viserys I Targaryen in the Game of Thrones series prequel House of the Dragon. Considine will portray Brendan Ingle in the upcoming biographical sports drama Giant opposite Mena Massoud as Naseem Hamed.

=== Filmmaking ===
==== Dog Altogether and Tyrannosaur ====
In 2007, Considine wrote and directed his first short film Dog Altogether, starring Peter Mullan, partially based on Considine's father. Dog Altogether won the 2007 BAFTA award for Best Short Film, as well as a Silver Lion for Best Short Film at the 2007 Venice Film Festival, a Best British Short at the 2007 British Independent Film Awards (BIFA), and the Seattle International Film Festival Short Film Jury Award (Narrative Special Jury Prize). He later developed the short into his first feature length directorial debut Tyrannosaur, with Olivia Colman and Peter Mullan resuming the story of the characters first presented in Dog Altogether. Mark Kermode of BBC Radio 5 Live hailed the film as one of the 11 Best Films of 2011. Kermode went on to award Olivia Colman Best Actress in his own Annual Kermode Awards. She tied with Tilda Swinton for We Need to Talk About Kevin.

By 18 December 2011, the film had won 21 awards from 28 nominations worldwide. The Guardian included the film in its shortlist for the First Film Award for 2012.

When the BAFTA Award nominations were announced on 17 January 2012, the omission of Olivia Colman in the Best Actress category led to global trending of both Olivia Colman and Tyrannosaur on Twitter. He also won a World Cinema Directing Award for his feature directorial debut Tyrannosaur at the 2011 Sundance Film Festival.

==== Journeyman ====
Considine's follow-up film 2017's Journeyman was written and directed and starred Considine alongside Jodie Whittaker and, although less well received than Tyrannosaur, it had an impact within the fighting community. Former UFC middleweight champion Michael Bisping cited Journeyman as the key driver to his retirement from the sport.

=== Music ===
After a short stint during college in a virtual comedy thrash group called 'Grunt', Considine and Shane Meadows formed the band She Talks To Angels (inspired by the Black Crowes song of the same name) with friends Richard Eaton, Simon Hudson, and Nick Hemming (later of The Leisure Society), with Meadows as vocalist and Considine as drummer. Considine left the band when they became more serious as he thought his drumming was not good enough. The remaining members re-formed, calling themselves Oslo. Appearing on Jools Holland's show, whilst Considine had moved on to study photography at the University of Brighton, where he formed a new group, a Britpop band called Pedestrians.

Considine has said that whilst he feels a lot like an imposter in the film industry, with music he has a sense of belonging and ease and felt is a place where he can express himself.

==== Riding the Low ====
Considine (vocals), alongside Chris Baldwin (guitar), Dan Baker (guitar), Richard Eaton (bass) and Justin Chambers (drums) formed a rock band called Riding the Low. In 2009, they released an EP They Will Rob You of Your Gifts, and, in 2013, an album What Happened to the Get To Know Ya?

The band's breakthrough performance was in 2014 after Tim Burgess of the Charlatans invited them to perform at his curated Tim Peaks Diner event at Festival No 6 in Portmeirion, Wales. Considine had contacted Burgess after reading his book Telling Stories, to discuss meditation. Considine said that this resulted in Burgess asking them to play at Portmeirion, and later to support the Charlatans at the O2 Academy in Leicester. Considine stated that "At first, it was raw – all we had was arrogance. We had a long way to go and we learnt our craft at all these pub gigs. We didn't expect a leg-up just because an actor is in the band."

In 2016, the band released their second full-length album Are Here to Help the Neighbourhood, recorded in Rockfield Studios and produced by Bassist Chris Slusarenko of Boston Spaceships and Guided By Voices. Considine penned the words while the band wrote the music.

In 2022, the band released their third album The Death of Gobshite Rambo. Considine told The Guardian that "Gobshite Rambo is the name Considine gave to the darker part of his own psyche, though it might just have easily described his dad, who died in 2006".

Their music is released under Clinical Finish Records, a label co-owned by Considine and Chris Baldwin, and distributed by Genepool.

== Personal life ==
Considine remains private in his personal life and once said if he ever became a celebrity, he would "disappear and go and make shoes like Daniel Day-Lewis" (a reference to Day-Lewis' sabbatical working as a shoemaker in Italy). In 2002, Considine married Shelley Insley, with whom he has been in a relationship since he was 18. They have three children. Considine still lives in his home town of Burton upon Trent with his family.

=== Health ===
In April 2011, then in his 30s, Considine revealed that he had been diagnosed with Asperger syndrome. He also has claimed to have Irlen syndrome, a likely pseudoscientific condition involving difficulty processing light.

== Performances and works ==
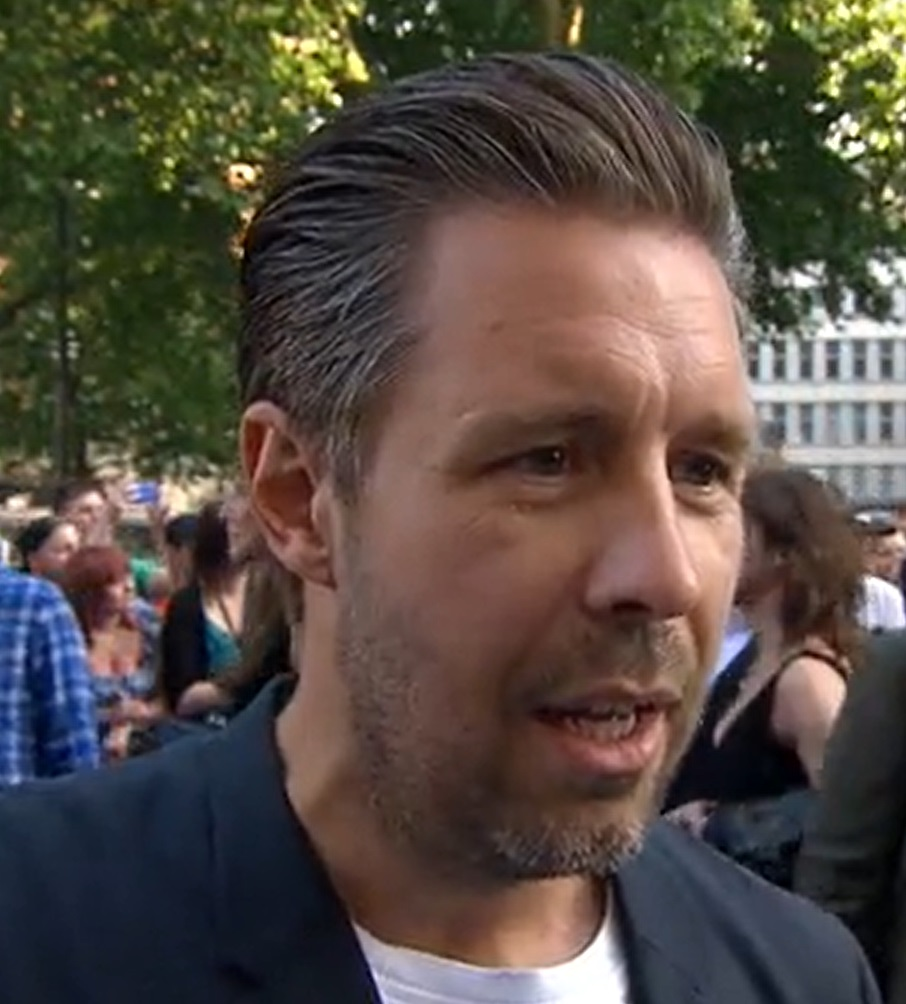
Paddy Considine at The World's End premiere, Leicester Square, July 10, 2013

Key
†	Denotes films that have not yet been released

=== Film ===
Year	Film	Role	Notes
1999	A Room for Romeo Brass	Morell	
2000	Last Resort	Alfie	
2000	Born Romantic	Ray	
2001	Happy Now?	Glen Marcus	
2001	The Martins	Hatfield Recorder Editor	
2002	24 Hour Party People	Rob Gretton	
2002	Close Your Eyes	Elliot Spruggs	
2002	My Wrongs 8245-8249 and 117	Him	Short film
2002	Bouncer	Knife Man	Short film
2003	In America	Johnny	
2004	Dead Man's Shoes	Richard	Also writer
2004	My Summer of Love	Phil	
2005	Cinderella Man	Mike Wilson	
2005	Stoned	Frank Thorogood	
2006	Bosque de Sombras	Norman	
2006	Pu-239	Timofey Berezin	
2006	This Is England	—N/a	Uncredited writer
2007	Hot Fuzz	DS Andy Wainwright	
2007	The Bourne Ultimatum	Simon Ross	
2007	Dog Altogether	—N/a	Short film; writer and director
2009	The Cry of the Owl	Robert Forrester	
2009	Le Donk & Scor-zay-zee	Le Donk	
2010	Submarine	Graham T. Purvis	
2011	Blitz	Sgt. Porter Nash	
2011	Tyrannosaur	—N/a	Writer and director
2012	Girl on a Bicycle	Derek	
2012	The Bourne Legacy	Simon Ross	Uncredited; archive footage
2012	Now Is Good	Father	
2013	The World's End	Steven Prince	
2013	The Double	Jack as PT Kommander	Uncredited
2014	Honour	Bounty Hunter	
2014	Pride	Dai Donovan	
2015	Child 44	Vladimir Malevich	
2015	Miss You Already	Jago	
2015	Macbeth	Banquo	
2016	The Girl with All the Gifts	Sergeant Eddie Parks	
2017	The Death of Stalin	Comrade Andreyev	
2017	Journeyman	Matty Burton	Writer and director
2017	Funny Cow	Angus	
2019	How to Build a Girl	Pat Morrigan	
2021	Wolf	The Zookeeper	
2025	Deep Cover	Fly	
2025	Heads of State	Viktor Gradov	
2027	Wife & Dog		Post-production

=== Television ===
Year	Title	Role	Notes
2006	Pu-239	Timofey Berezin	Television film
2008	My Zinc Bed	Paul Peplow	Television film
2009	Red Riding: In the Year of Our Lord 1980	Peter Hunter	Television film
2011	The Suspicions of Mr Whicher: The Murder at Road Hill House	Detective Inspector Jack Whicher	Television film
2013	The Suspicions of Mr Whicher: The Murder in Angel Lane	Detective Inspector Jack Whicher	Television film
2014	The Suspicions of Mr Whicher: Beyond the Pale	Detective Inspector Jack Whicher	Television film
2014	The Suspicions of Mr Whicher: 'Til Death Do Us Part	Detective Inspector Jack Whicher	Television film
2016	Peaky Blinders	Father John Hughes	4 episodes
2018	Informer	Gabe Waters	Miniseries
2020	The Outsider	Claude Bolton / The Outsider	Miniseries; 10 episodes
2020	The Third Day	Mr. Martin	Miniseries; 6 episodes
2022–2024	House of the Dragon	Viserys I Targaryen	Main role (season 1); Uncredited role (season 2); 11 episodes
2025	Small Town, Big Story	Seamus Proctor	Miniseries; main role; 6 episodes
2025–present	MobLand	Kevin Harrigan	Main role; 10 episodes
TBA	Untitled Charlie Brooker series †		Upcoming series
TBA	Army of Shadows †		Upcoming series

=== Theatre ===
Year	Title	Role	Venue
2017	The Ferryman	Quinn Carney	Royal Court Theatre and Gielgud Theatre, London
2018	The Ferryman	Quinn Carney	Bernard B. Jacobs Theatre, New York

=== Music videos ===
Year	Artist	Title	Notes
2003	Coldplay	"God Put a Smile upon Your Face"	
2003	Moloko	"Familiar Feeling"	
2006	Arctic Monkeys	"Leave Before the Lights Come On"	Also writer

== Awards and nominations ==
Year	Group	Award	Film	Result
2000	Thessaloniki Film Festival Award	Best Actor (tied with Misel Maticevic)	Last Resort	Won
2003	British Independent Film Awards	Best Actor	In America	Nominated
2004	British Independent Film Awards	Best Actor	Dead Man's Shoes	Nominated
2004	British Independent Film Awards	Best Screenplay (shared with Shane Meadows)	Dead Man's Shoes	Nominated
2004	British Independent Film Awards	Best Supporting Actor/Actress	My Summer of Love	Nominated
2004	London Critics Circle Film Awards	ALFS Award – British Actor of the Year	In America	Nominated
2004	Golden Satellite Award	Best Performance by an Actor in a Motion Picture, Drama	In America	Nominated
2004	Screen Actors Guild Awards	Outstanding Performance by a Cast in a Motion Picture	In America	Nominated
2005	Empire Awards	Best British Actor	Dead Man's Shoes	Won
2005	Evening Standard British Film Awards	Best Actor	Dead Man's Shoes	Won
2005	London Critics Circle Film Awards	ALFS Award – British Actor of the Year	Dead Man's Shoes	Nominated
2006	British Independent Film Award	Best Actor	In America	Nominated
2006	London Critics Circle Film Awards	ALFS Award – British Supporting Actor of the Year	Cinderella Man	Nominated
2007	Venice Film Festival Award	Silver Lion – Best Short Film	Dog Altogether	Won
2007	British Independent Film Award	Best British Short Film	Dog Altogether	Won
2007	Seattle International Film Festival Award	Special Jury Prize, Narrative	Dog Altogether	Won
2007	Edinburgh International Film Festival Award	Best British Short Film	Dog Altogether	Nominated
2008	BAFTA Awards	Best Short Film	Dog Altogether	Won
2011	Sundance International Film Festival Award	The World Cinema Award for Directing: Dramatic	Tyrannosaur	Won
2011	Nantucket Film Festival Award	Best Writer/Director	Tyrannosaur	Won
2011	Munich Film Festival	CineVision Award Outstanding Debut Feature	Tyrannosaur	Won
2011	Voices Festival of independent European Cinema	Voices Festival Prize: Best Film	Tyrannosaur	Won
2011	Dinard British Film Festival France	The Golden Hitchcock: Grand Jury Prize/Ciné+ Award	Tyrannosaur	Won
2011	Dinard British Film Festival France	The Allianz Award: Best Screenplay	Tyrannosaur	Won
2011	Zagreb Film Festival Croatia	T-Com Audience Award: Best Film	Tyrannosaur	Won
2011	Thessaloniki International Film Festival, Greece	Fischer Audience Award (For a film in the Open Horizons section)	Tyrannosaur	Won
2011	Mar del Plata Film Festival	Jury Special Award	Tyrannosaur	Won
2011	Mar del Plata Film Festival	Silver Astor for Best Screenplay	Tyrannosaur	Won
2011	Mar del Plata Film Festival	Argentine Film Critics Association ACCA Award	Tyrannosaur	Won
2011	Mar del Plata Film Festival	SIGNIS (World Catholic Association for Communication) Award	Tyrannosaur	Nominated
2011	Stockholm Film Festival	Best First Feature	Tyrannosaur	Won
2011	British Independent Film Awards	Best British Independent Film	Tyrannosaur	Won
2011	British Independent Film Awards	Best Director	Tyrannosaur	Nominated
2011	British Independent Film Awards	The Douglas Hickox Award (Best Debut Director)	Tyrannosaur	Won
2011	British Independent Film Awards	Best Achievement in Production	Tyrannosaur	Nominated
2011	International Press Academy Satellite Awards	Best Screenplay: Original	Tyrannosaur	Nominated
2011	International Press Academy Satellite Awards	Best First Feature	Tyrannosaur	Won
2012	Independent Spirit Awards	Best International Film	Tyrannosaur	Nominated
2012	The Guardian First Film Award	Best First Film	Tyrannosaur	Nominated
2012	London Critics Circle Film Awards	The Virgin Atlantic Award – Breakthrough British Film-Maker	Tyrannosaur	Nominated
2012	British Academy Film Awards (BAFTA)	Outstanding debut by a British Writer, Director or Producer	Tyrannosaur	Won
2012	Evening Standard British Film Awards	Best Film	Tyrannosaur	Nominated
2012	Evening Standard British Film Awards	Best Screenplay	Tyrannosaur	Nominated
2012	Jameson Empire Awards	Best British Film	Tyrannosaur	Nominated
2012	Bucharest International Film Festival	Best Film	Tyrannosaur	Won
2012	Bucharest International Film Festival	Critics' Choice Award	Tyrannosaur	Won
2012	Transilvania International Film Festival	FIPRESCI (International Federation of Film Critics) Award	Tyrannosaur	Won
2012	Writers' Guild of Great Britain	Best Screenplay	Tyrannosaur	Nominated
2017	British Independent Film Awards	Best Actor	Journeyman	Nominated
2018	Olivier Awards	Best Actor	The Ferryman	Nominated
2019	Tony Award	Best Actor in a Play	The Ferryman	Nominated
2019	Drama League Awards	Distinguished Performance Award	The Ferryman	Nominated
2026	British Academy Television Awards	Best Supporting Actor	MobLand	Pending
