= Mark Herbert =

English film producer

Mark Herbert is an English film producer and joint CEO of the Sheffield-based production company Warp Films.

He was born in Doncaster, and studied Film Studies at Sheffield Hallam University between 1991 and 1994.
