= Chailly (surname) =

Chailly is a surname. Notable people with the surname include:

- Cecilia Chailly (born 1960), Italian harpist, composer, singer and writer, daughter of Luciano and sister of Riccardo
- Luciano Chailly (1920–2002), Italian composer, father of Riccardo and Cecilia
- Riccardo Chailly (born 1953), Italian conductor, son of Luciano and brother of Cecilia
