= Official Classical Singles Chart =

Song chart in the United Kingdom

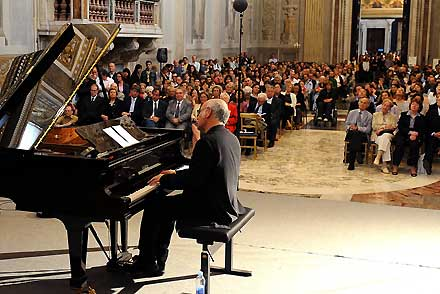
Pianist Ludovico Einaudi spent 54 weeks at number one on the Official Classical Singles Chart, longer than any other artist.

The Official Classical Singles Chart was a record chart based on downloads and streaming of classical music in the United Kingdom. (Note: At the time of the chart's launch, a digital audio track was eligible to count as a single only if it was sold for at least £0.40 and was no longer than 15 minutes.) (Note: The OCC used the term classical in a broad sense to represent a wide genre of music. Singles generally qualified for the chart if they were "composed by recognised classical composers and/or in a publicly recognised classical idiom or form", and were "capable of live performance in a concert setting". For singles of ambiguous genre, the OCC referred to the Classical Advisory Panel.) Each week's chart was compiled by the Official Charts Company (OCC) and was first published on Monday afternoon on their official website. The chart ran for 140 weeks from 2012 to 2015, during which time a total of 23 singles by 22 artists reached number one. The most successful artist was the Italian pianist Ludovico Einaudi, who topped the chart with three singles for a total of 54 weeks, while the most successful record label was Decca Records, which spent 89 weeks at number one with six singles. Einaudi's track "I Giorni" from his album of the same name spent 51 weeks at number one, longer than any other single. In January 2013, following the release of Einaudi's album In a Time Lapse, singles by the pianist accounted for 13 of the Top 20 on the Official Classical Singles Chart. Martin Talbot, managing director of the OCC, described him as one of the chart's "biggest and most consistent stars".

Singles would often top the chart as a result of exposure in popular media, including films such as Fifty Shades of Grey, The Dark Knight Rises and Man of Steel. In July 2012, a rendition of Spem in alium by the Tallis Scholars topped the chart following its usage in Fifty Shades of Grey. E. L. James, author of the original novel on which the film was based, said that she was delighted that her readers had been introduced to the piece of music, and that it was a "deserved number one". Three weeks later, the London Symphony Orchestra reached number one after their version of "Chariots of Fire" by Vangelis was used in the 2012 Summer Olympics opening ceremony. Three of the top five singles on that week's chart were related to the 2012 Summer Olympics.

Reaction to the Official Classical Singles Chart was generally positive. Tenor Russell Watson described it as "absolutely amazing", while the New Zealand soprano Hayley Westenra said that she was "really excited" about the chart's launch. Composer Paul Mealor described the chart as "absolutely fantastic". Conversely, Mike Spring, sales manager at Hyperion Records, was more skeptical, as he had observed that downloads of classical music had mainly comprised whole albums or works, rather than individual singles. Similarly, Anthony Anderson, managing director of classical music record label Naxos UK, stated: "By its nature, this chart will be more relevant to other companies."

== Chart history ==
"The new Official Classical Singles Chart is designed to reflect the changing ways in which classical fans are buying their music – track by track, as well as album by album. Coming just five months after the Military Wives became the first classical choir to top the Official Singles Chart, this launch further underlines how classical music is reaching into the mainstream."

— Official Charts Company managing director Martin Talbot

The Official Classical Singles Chart was launched in 2012. According to Umusic, the official website for Universal Music in the UK, it reflected a shift in the British public's consumption of classical music from albums to tracks. At the time of the launch, classical music was becoming more popular in the UK; the previous year, download sales of individual classical tracks had increased by 46% (from 834,000 to 1.2 million), while the single "Wherever You Are" by Military Wives had been the 2011 UK Singles Chart Christmas number one. During 2012's first quarter, approximately 284,000 classical music downloads were purchased in the UK, an increase of 34% compared to the same period the previous year. Alongside the new singles chart, the Classic Brit Awards announced at the same time that it would launch a Top Single Award at the 2012 ceremony to commemorate the most popular classical single that year.

The first chart was published on 28 May 2012, and was based solely on downloads of classical singles in the UK. At number one was a version of the UK's national anthem, "God Save the Queen", by the BBC Concert Orchestra and the British conductor Barry Wordsworth, which reached the top during the week of the Diamond Jubilee of Elizabeth II. From 27 June 2014, streaming counted towards the UK's music charts, including the Official Classical Singles Chart, with 100 streams equating to one download. The first number one under this new methodology was "Nessun dorma" by Luciano Pavarotti. After nearly three years of publication, the chart was retired in February 2015, with its final number one being "I Giorni" – lack of media interest was cited as the reason for its dissolution. Reflecting on the chart later that year, Phillip Sommerich of Rhinegold Publishing felt that its retirement spoke to the difficulty in generating excitement in the UK's classical music sector.

== Number ones ==
Key
No.	nth song to top the Official Classical Singles Chart
re	Return of a single to number one

No.	Artist (Note: The artist, album, record label, date of reaching number one and number of weeks at number one are those given by the OCC.)	Single	Record label	Reached number one (for the week ending)	Weeks at number one
1	BBC Concert Orchestra/Barry Wordsworth	"God Save the Queen"	Philips	2 June 2012	3
2	Miloš Karadaglić	"Libertango"	Deutsche Grammophon	23 June 2012	1
3	Luciano Pavarotti	"Nessun dorma"	Decca	30 June 2012	3
4	The Tallis Scholars/Peter Phillips	"Spem in alium"	Gimell	21 July 2012	2
5	Hans Zimmer	"Rise"	Sony Classical	4 August 2012	1
6	London Symphony Orchestra/Simon Rattle	"Chariots of Fire"	UMC	11 August 2012	5
re	Luciano Pavarotti	"Nessun dorma"	Decca	15 September 2012	2
7	Academy of St Martin in the Fields/Neville Marriner	"Canon in D Major"	EMI	29 September 2012	1
8	Ludovico Einaudi	"I Giorni"	Decca	6 October 2012	3
re	Luciano Pavarotti	"Nessun dorma"	Decca	27 October 2012	7
9	Only Boys Aloud	"Calon Lân"	Relentless	15 December 2012	1
10	John Williams	"O Holy Night"	Sony	22 December 2012	2
11	Military Wives/Gareth Malone	"Wherever You Are"	Decca	5 January 2013	2
re	Ludovico Einaudi	"I Giorni"	Decca	19 January 2013	2
12	Ludovico Einaudi	"Time Lapse"	Decca	2 February 2013	1
re	Ludovico Einaudi	"I Giorni"	Decca	9 February 2013	8
re	Luciano Pavarotti	"Nessun dorma"	Decca	6 April 2013	1
re	Ludovico Einaudi	"I Giorni"	Decca	13 April 2013	9
re	Luciano Pavarotti	"Nessun dorma"	Decca	15 June 2013	1
re	Ludovico Einaudi	"I Giorni"	Decca	22 June 2013	1
13	Hans Zimmer	"What Are You Going to Do When You Are Not Saving the World?"	Sony Classical	29 June 2013	3
14	Hans Zimmer	"Time"	Reprise	20 July 2013	2
re	Luciano Pavarotti	"Nessun dorma"	Decca	3 August 2013	1
re	Ludovico Einaudi	"I Giorni"	Decca	10 August 2013	2
15	Hans Zimmer	"Finale"	Walt Disney	24 August 2013	1
re	Hans Zimmer	"Time"	Reprise	31 August 2013	1
16	Craig Armstrong	"Glasgow Love Theme"	Sanctuary	7 September 2013	2
re	Luciano Pavarotti	"Nessun dorma"	Decca	21 September 2013	1
re	Ludovico Einaudi	"I Giorni"	Decca	28 September 2013	3
17	Ludovico Einaudi	"Experience"	Decca	19 October 2013	1
re	Luciano Pavarotti	"Nessun dorma"	Decca	26 October 2013	5
re	Hans Zimmer	"Time"	Reprise	30 November 2013	1
re	Ludovico Einaudi	"I Giorni"	Decca	7 December 2013	2
18	Jonathan Goldstein/Victoria Beaumont	"Magical Moments (Waiting for You)"	Eagle-i	21 December 2013	3
re	Luciano Pavarotti	"Nessun dorma"	Decca	11 January 2014	1
re	Ludovico Einaudi	"I Giorni"	Decca	18 January 2014	1
re	Luciano Pavarotti	"Nessun dorma"	Decca	25 January 2014	1
re	Ludovico Einaudi	"I Giorni"	Decca	1 February 2014	3
19	Paul Englishby	"Carnage"	Silva Screen	22 February 2014	1
re	Ludovico Einaudi	"I Giorni"	Decca	29 February 2014	1
re	Ludovico Einaudi	"Experience"	Decca	8 March 2014	1
re	Ludovico Einaudi	"I Giorni"	Decca	15 March 2014	1
20	The Piano Guys	"Beethoven's 5 Secrets"	Sony Classical	22 March 2014	2
re	Ludovico Einaudi	"I Giorni"	Decca	5 April 2014	1
re	Luciano Pavarotti	"Nessun dorma"	Decca	12 April 2014	2
re	The Piano Guys	"Beethoven's 5 Secrets"	Sony Classical	26 April 2014	1
re	Ludovico Einaudi	"I Giorni"	Decca	3 May 2014	5
re	Hans Zimmer	"Time"	Reprise	7 June 2014	1
re	Luciano Pavarotti	"Nessun dorma"	Decca	14 June 2014	4
re	Hans Zimmer	"Time"	Reprise	12 July 2014	4
re	Luciano Pavarotti	"Nessun dorma"	Decca	9 August 2014	2
re	Ludovico Einaudi	"I Giorni"	Decca	23 August 2014	7
21	Various artists	"Steadfast"	Decca	18 October 2014	2
22	Richard Rock	"Harmonium"	Motif	1 November 2014	1
re	Hans Zimmer	"Time"	Reprise	8 November 2014	3
23	Hans Zimmer	"Stay"	Sony Classical	29 November 2014	2
re	John Williams	"O Holy Night"	Sony	20 December 2014	3
re	Hans Zimmer	"Time"	Reprise	10 January 2015	4
re	Ludovico Einaudi	"I Giorni"	Decca	7 February 2015	2

=== By artist ===
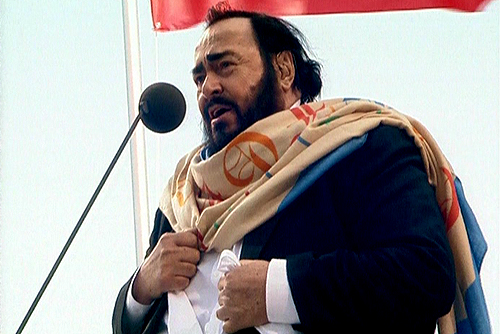
Opera singer Luciano Pavarotti spent 31 weeks at the top of the chart with his version of "Nessun dorma".

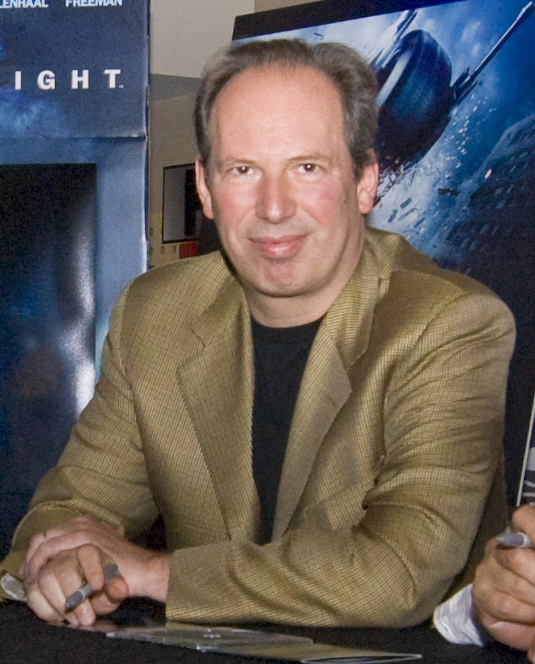
Composer Hans Zimmer achieved the most number-one classical singles, with five.

Six artists spent five or more weeks at the top of the Official Classical Singles Chart.

Artist	Number ones	Weeks at number one
Ludovico Einaudi	3	54
Luciano Pavarotti	1	31
Hans Zimmer	5	23
London Symphony Orchestra	1	5
Simon Rattle	1	5
John Williams	1	5

=== By record label ===
Five record labels spent five or more weeks at the top of the Official Classical Singles Chart.

Record label	Number ones	Weeks at number one
Decca Records	6	89
Reprise Records	1	16
Sony Classical Records	4	9
Sony Music	1	5
UMC	1	5

== Data sources ==
The Official Classical Singles Chart was compiled by the OCC using download and (from June 2014) streaming data from the following music sources:

Websites

- 7Digital
- Amazon.com
- HMV.com
- iTunes
- Sainsburys.com
- Tesco.com

Streaming services

- Deezer
- Music Unlimited
- Napster
- O2 Tracks
- Spotify
- We7
