= Victoria Sinitsina =

Russian ice dancer (born 1995)

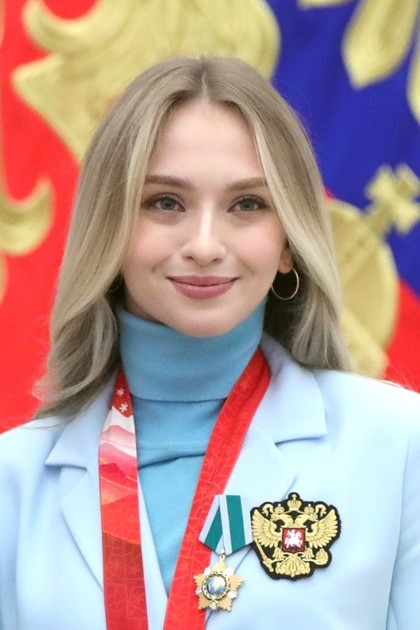
- Sinitsina at the Kremlin in 2022

Personal information
- Native name: Виктория Александровна Синицина
- Full name: Victoria Alexandrovna Sinitsina
- Other names: Viktoria
- Born: 29 April 1995 (age 31) Moscow, Russia
- Home town: Moscow
- Height: 1.68 m (5 ft 6 in)

Figure skating career
- Country: Russia
- Partner: Nikita Katsalapov
- Coach: Alexander Zhulin; Petr Durnev
- Skating club: Olympic School Moskvich, Moscow
- Began skating: 1999
Medal record
Figure skating: Ice dance
Representing ROC (with Katsalapov)
Olympic Games
| Silver medal – second place | 2022 Beijing | Ice dancing |
| Bronze medal – third place | 2022 Beijing | Team (Note: On 29 January 2024 CAS disqualified Valieva for four years retroactive to 25 December 2021 for an anti-doping rule violation. On 30 January 2024 the ISU reallocated medals to upgrade the United States to gold and Japan to silver while downgrading ROC to bronze.) |
Representing FSR (with Katsalapov)
World Championships
| Gold medal – first place | 2021 Stockholm | Ice dancing |
Representing Russia (with Katsalapov)
World Championships
| Silver medal – second place | 2019 Saitama | Ice dancing |
Grand Prix Final
| Silver medal – second place | 2018–19 Vancouver | Ice dancing |
World Team Trophy
| Gold medal – first place | 2021 Osaka | Team |
| Bronze medal – third place | 2019 Fukuoka | Team |
Representing Russia (with Zhiganshin)
World Junior Championships
| Gold medal – first place | 2012 Minsk | Ice dancing |
Junior Grand Prix Final
| Gold medal – first place | 2011–12 Quebec | Ice dancing |
| Silver medal – second place | 2010–11 Beijing | Ice dancing |

Victoria Alexandrovna Sinitsina (Russian: Виктория Александровна Синицина; born 29 April 1995) is a Russian ice dancer. With Nikita Katsalapov, she is the 2022 Olympic bronze medalist in the team event, 2022 Olympic silver medalist, 2021 World champion, two-time European Champion (2020,2022), the 2019 World silver medalist, the 2018–19 Grand Prix Final silver medalist, and a two-time Russian national champion (2019–2020). They have also won several medals on the Grand Prix and the Challenger Series, including winning the 2018 CS Ondrej Nepela Trophy.

With former partner Ruslan Zhiganshin, she was the 2012 World Junior champion and won bronze medals at the 2013 Winter Universiade, 2012 Rostelecom Cup, and 2014 Russian Championships.

== Personal life ==
Sinitsina was born on 29 April 1995 in Moscow. Her father, Alexander Sinitsin, and aunt, Tatiana Sinitsina, are former gymnasts.

On 22 May 2022, ice dancing partner Nikita Katsalapov proposed to Sinitsina. In October 2022, Sinitsina and Katsalapov officially became husband and wife.

== Early years on the ice ==
Often having tonsillitis as a child, Sinitsina was introduced to skating by her parents to improve her health. She took up ice dancing at age 10 and had one partner before Zhiganshin.

== Partnership with Zhiganshin ==
Sinitsina and Ruslan Zhiganshin met in a group led by Irina Lobacheva and Ilia Averbukh but soon joined Elena Kustarova and Svetlana Alexeeva. They trained mostly in Moscow. From 2010 to 2012, they also went to summer training camps in Ventspils, Latvia.

=== Junior ===
Sinitsina/Zhiganshin debuted on the Junior Grand Prix circuit at the 2008 Merano Cup where they finished sixth. The following JGP season, they placed fifth at both of their events.

They won a pair of silver medals during the 2010–11 JGP season and qualified for the JGP Final. At the Final, they won the short dance and placed second in the free dance to take the silver behind Monko/Khaliavin. They withdrew from the 2011 Russian Junior Championships due to Sinitsina's illness.

In the 2011–12 season, Sinitsina/Zhiganshin won gold at the Junior Grand Prix event in Poland, their first JGP title. They won another title in Austria to qualify for their second JGP Final. At the Junior Grand Prix Final, they placed first in both segments and won the title. They then took gold at the 2012 Russian Junior Championships. Sinitsina/Zhiganshin won the 2012 World Junior title. They were first in both the short and free dance and scored their season's best, 153.81 points.

=== Senior ===
In the 2012–13 season, Sinitsina/Zhiganshin debuted on the senior Grand Prix series. After finishing sixth at the 2012 Cup of China, they then won their first senior Grand Prix medal, bronze, at the 2012 Rostelecom Cup. The duo finished 5th in their senior national debut at the 2013 Russian Championships.

In 2013–14, Sinitsina/Zhiganshin started their season at the Ice Star in Minsk, Belarus, winning the silver medal behind Bobrova/Soloviev. At their sole Grand Prix assignment, the 2013 NHK Trophy, they had a bad fall while practicing a lift. They finished eighth at the event. After taking the bronze medal at the 2013 Winter Universiade in Trentino, Italy, they stepped onto the senior national podium for the first time at the 2014 Russian Championships. Competing against Riazanova/Tkachenko for Russia's third Olympic spot, Sinitsina/Zhiganshin finished ahead at nationals and then at the 2014 European Championships in Budapest. They came in fourth at the latter event, their senior ISU Championship debut.

Along with Ilinykh/Katsalapov and Bobrova/Soloviev, Sinitsina/Zhiganshin were selected to represent Russia at the Winter Olympics, held in February 2014 in Sochi. They finished sixteenth at the Olympics, behind a number of teams they had surpassed at Europeans, but rebounded the next month at the 2014 World Championships. They placed eighth in both segments and finished seventh overall in Saitama, Japan. Sinitsina ended their partnership after Worlds.

== Partnership with Katsalapov ==
On 11 April 2014, Sinitsina and Nikita Katsalapov applied for approval of their partnership from the Figure Skating Federation of Russia (FSFR). They then traveled to Michigan to train for three weeks under Marina Zueva.

=== 2014–15 season ===
Sinitsina/Katsalapov made their competitive debut at the 2014 Rostelecom Cup, a Grand Prix event in Moscow; they placed fourth in both segments and finished well behind their former partners. At the 2014 NHK Trophy, they finished fifth in the short dance, eighth in the free dance after falling on one lift and aborting another, and eighth overall. They were fourth at the 2015 Russian Championships.

=== 2015–16 season ===
A stress fracture in his foot that kept Katsalapov off the ice in early 2015 recurred in the summer of 2015, keeping the duo out of test skates organized by the FSFR. Competing in the 2015–16 Grand Prix series, Sinitsina/Katsalapov won the silver medal at the 2015 Skate America, obtaining the highest total technical elements score in the free dance, and then bronze at the 2015 Rostelecom Cup, behind Italians Cappellini/Lanotte. They were the second highest-ranked Russian couple in the Grand Prix rankings, behind Ekaterina Bobrova and Dmitri Soloviev who also won one silver and one bronze but had a higher total short dance score, and were the first alternates for the 2015–16 Grand Prix Final. In December, Sinitsina/Katsalapov won the silver medal behind Bobrova/Soloviev at the 2016 Russian Championships in Yekaterinburg.

In January, Sinitsina/Katsalapov finished fourth behind Bobrova/Soloviev at the 2016 European Championships in Bratislava, Slovakia. They placed ninth at the 2016 World Championships in Boston.

Two days after the World Championships, Katsalapov received a surgery on his right shoulder.

=== 2016–17 season ===
In mid-2016, Sinitsina/Katsalapov returned to Russia to train and continue rehabilitation of his shoulder in Moscow. Oleg Volkov was named as their coach and Elena Tchaikovskaya was added later to their coaching team.

At their Grand Prix events they first placed fourth at the 2016 Cup of China and then fifth at the 2016 NHK Trophy. At the 2017 Russian Championships they won the bronze medal but finished only tenth at the 2017 European Championships.

=== 2017–18 season ===
Sinitsina/Katsalapov were scheduled for the later Grand Prix events NHK Trophy and Skate America in November. Before their Grand Prix events they skated one Challenger event, the 2017 CS Minsk-Arena Ice Star, where they won the bronze medal. At their Grand Prix events they first placed fourth at the 2017 NHK Trophy and then they won the bronze medal at the 2017 Skate America. At the 2018 Russian Championships they had to withdraw after the short dance.

=== 2018–19 season ===
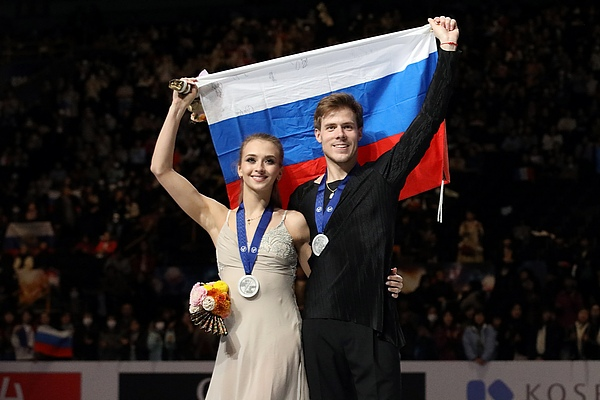
Sinitsina/Katsalapov at the 2019 World Championships

Sinitsina/Katsalapov started their season at the 2018 CS Ondrej Nepela Trophy where they won the gold medal with a personal best score of 196.42 points. In late October they won the silver medal at the 2018 Skate Canada. In late November they won their second Grand Prix silver medal of the season at the 2018 Internationaux de France. At this event they also scored their personal best score of 200.38 points. With two Grand Prix silver medals they qualified for the 2018–19 Grand Prix Final. At the Grand Prix Final, Sinitsina/Katsalapov won the silver medal after placing third in the rhythm dance and second in the free dance. At this event they also scored their personal best score of 201.37 points.

At the 2019 Russian Championships, Sinitsina/Katsalapov placed first in both the rhythm and free dances, taking the Russian national title for the first time in their careers.

Sinitsina/Katsalapov were medal favourites going into the 2019 European Championships, but encountered issues in the rhythm dance when first Katsalapov and then Sinitsina fell during their twizzle sequence. They placed fifth in the rhythm dance, almost nine points behind the third-place team, and effectively out of medal contention. Katsalapov was uncertain as to the cause, saying "I don’t know exactly what happened. I can’t excuse it or justify it." They placed third in the free dance, winning a bronze small medal, with Katsalapov saying that they "fought hard to show the beautiful choreography of our program and avoid any stupid mistakes."

At the 2019 World Championships, Sinitsina/Katsalapov placed second in both segments, winning the silver medal, their first World medal.She commented that it was "five years we started to skate together, and we know each other really well. The cooperation in our team comes from our ties and the group of coaches who help us a lot." Subsequently, they were assigned to the 2019 World Team Trophy, finishing second in both dance segments, and winning the bronze medal as part of Team Russia.

=== 2019–20 season ===
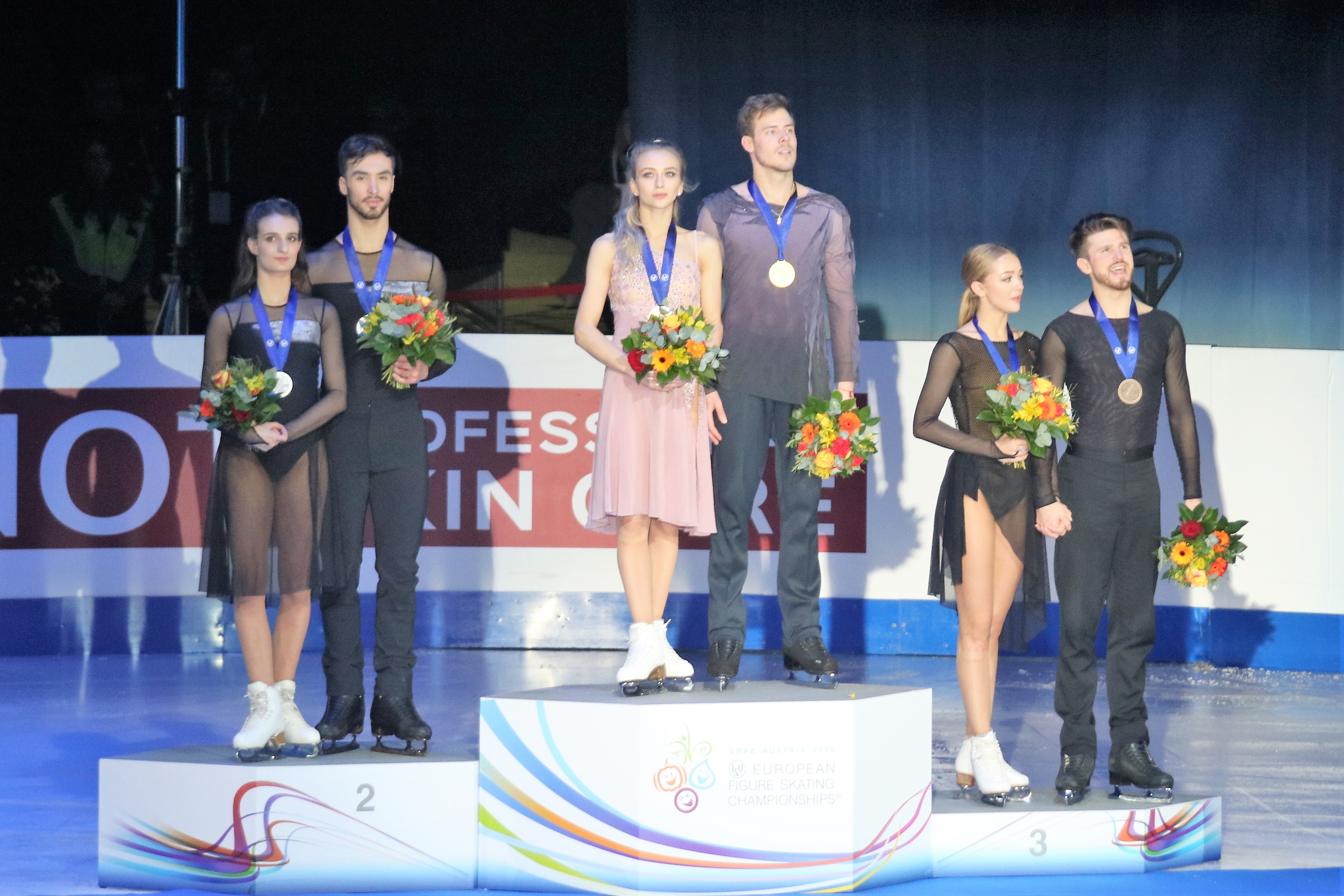
Sinitsina/Katsalapov claim gold at the 2020 European Championships

Sinitsina/Katsalapov started their season at the 2019 CS Ondrej Nepela Memorial, where they won the gold medal. On the Grand Prix, they began at the 2019 Cup of China, where they placed first in the rhythm dance with a new personal best score. The finished second in the free dance, behind Madison Chock/Evan Bates, but their rhythm dance lead was sufficient to give them the gold medal. Katsalapov said they were "not pleased with our performance today", and hoped that they would show improvement the following week. At the 2019 Rostelecom Cup, they won the gold medal. Katsalapov said they looked forward to showing their "very best" at the Grand Prix Final. Competing at the Final, they unexpectedly placed fourth in the rhythm dance after a number of technical issues, leading him to comment "I made a mistake on the twizzles and realized that level would be definitely reduced. But looking at the points and levels, it seems that everything was bad." In the free dance, they came sixth out of the six teams after losing levels on a number of elements and Sinitsina having a technical fall in their choreographic sliding movement, and dropped to sixth overall.

Competing at the 2020 Russian Championships, Sinitsina/Katsalapov placed first in the rhythm dance despite a slight loss of balance by Katsalapov in his twizzle sequence. Second in the free dance, they nevertheless won their second national title.

In what would prove to be their final competition of the season, Sinitsina/Katsalapov competed at the 2020 European Championships in Graz. After the rhythm dance, they were in second place, separated from five-time defending champions Papadakis/Cizeron by only 0.05 points. In a close result, they won the free dance and took the title overall by a margin of 0.14 points. This marked the first time anyone had beaten Papadakis/Cizeron since Virtue/Moir at the 2018 Winter Olympics, and the first time they had been defeated in the free dance since the 2016–17 Grand Prix Final. The result was considered a major upset, with Katsalapov remarking "to get anywhere near Gabriella and Guillaume seemed impossible for all the skaters."

The European result generated immediate speculation that Sinitsina/Katsalapov could challenge Papadakis/Cizeron for the World gold at the 2020 World Championships in Montreal, but these were cancelled as a result of the coronavirus pandemic.

=== 2020–21 season ===
Due to Katsalapov recovering from an injury, the team missed the 2020 Russian senior test skates. Sinitsina/Katsalapov thus began the season at the second stage of the domestic Russia Cup, but had to withdraw midway through the free dance after Sinitsina suffered severe tendon inflammation.

Following recovery, the duo had their first full competition at the 2020 Rostelecom Cup, placing first in the rhythm dance by a wide margin. They struggled toward the end of their free dance, which Sinitsina said was their "first full run-through", but remained comfortably first in both the segment and overall. They subsequently withdrew from the fifth stage of the Russian Cup and the 2021 Russian Championships due to medical issues. Katsalapov subsequently indicated that both had contracted COVID-19, with his being a mild case while hers was "severe" and damaged her lungs. The two were announced as performing in a New Year's skating show to help regain competitive form.

Following a victory at the Russian Cup Final, Sinitsina/Katsalapov were assigned to the 2021 World Championships, to be held without an audience in Stockholm. Four-time and defending champions Papadakis/Cizeron declined to attend due to their own illness with COVID and lack of training time, leading to much speculation that Sinitsina/Katsalapov were the frontrunners to claim the World title. They won both the rhythm and free dances to take the gold medal, setting personal bests for the free dance and total score. Their placement combined with the fifth-place finish of Stepanova/Bukin qualified three berths for Russian ice dance at the 2022 Winter Olympic Games in Beijing.

Sinitsina/Katsalapov finished the season at the 2021 World Team Trophy, where they finished first in both of their segments and Team Russia won the gold medal.

=== 2021–22 season ===
After debuting their programs at the Russian senior test skates, Sinitsina/Katsalapov withdrew from a planned appearance on the domestic Russian Cup series due to Katsalapov suffering a back injury.

Making their season debut on the Grand Prix at the 2021 NHK Trophy, Sinitsina/Katsalapov won the gold medal. Speaking after the free dance, Katsalapov credited the crowd for it support, and said that "we want to improve further, but for now we are happy. Our program is about us, our career and hopefully with a bright finish." They won a second gold at the 2021 Rostelecom Cup. The results qualified them for the Grand Prix Final, to be held in Osaka, but it was subsequently cancelled due to restrictions prompted by the Omicron variant.

Seeking to win their third national title at the 2022 Russian Championships, Sinitsina/Katsalapov won the rhythm dance. However, they then had to withdraw from the event due to an exacerbation of Katsalapov's back injury. Despite this, they were named to the Russian team for the 2022 European Championships. Sinitsina/Katsalapov won both segments of the competition to successfully defend their European title. On 20 January, they were officially named to the Russian Olympic team.

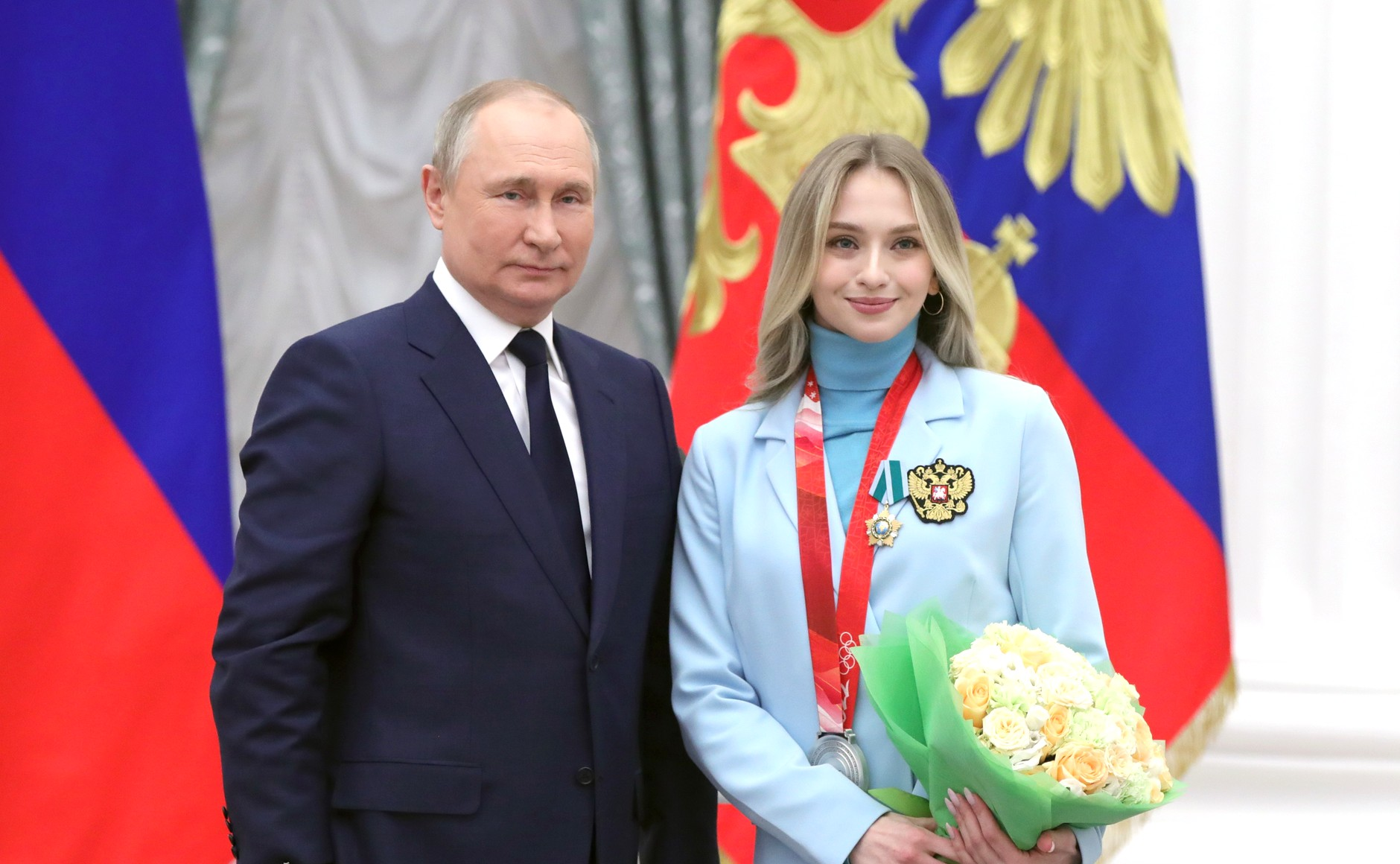
Sinitsina and Vladimir Putin at the state ceremony for Russian Olympic medalists

Sinitsina/Katsalapov began the 2022 Winter Olympics as the Russian entries in the rhythm dance segment of the Olympic team event. They unexpectedly placed second in the segment, behind Americans Hubbell/Donohue, after Katsalapov lost a twizzle level and visibly stumbled at one point. Skating the free dance segment as well, they finished second behind Americans Chock/Bates due to an extended lift deduction, but nevertheless won the gold medal as part of Team Russia. In the ice dance event, Sinitsina/Katsalapov came second in the rhythm dance with 88.85, 1.98 points behind Papadakis/Cizeron's world record score. Second in the free dance as well, they won the silver medal, Sinitsina's second Olympic medal and Katsalapov's fourth.

Days after the Olympics, Russian president Vladimir Putin ordered a full-scale invasion of Ukraine. In response to this, the International Skating Union banned all Russian and Belarusian athletes from competing at the 2022 World Championships, bringing an end to Sinitsina and Katsalapov's international season.

== Television ==
She appeared in the ninth season of ice show contest Ice Age.

== Support of Russia's invasion of Ukraine ==
On 18 March 2022, Sinitsina and Katsalapov appeared at Putin's Moscow rally celebrating the annexation of Crimea from Ukraine in 2014 and justifying the invasion of Ukraine. They both wore the Z military symbol used by the Russian invading army in Ukraine. Sinitsina and Katsalapov's presence at the rally was criticized by their former training partners, Ukrainian ice dancers Oleksandra Nazarova and Maksym Nikitin, who spent weeks caught in the siege of Kharkiv. Nikitin said "we were such big friends with Vika and Nikita. It was so difficult to see how they are supporting their President who is killing our Ukrainian people."

In December 2022, the Ukrainian Parliament sanctioned Sinitsina and Katsalapov for their support of the war.

== Programs ==
=== With Katsalapov ===
| Season | Rhythm dance | Free dance | Exhibition |
|---|---|---|---|
| 2021–22 | You Can Leave Your Hat On (from 9½ Weeks) performed by Joe Cocker; Brick House by Commodores choreo. by Sergey Petukhov | Piano Concerto No. 2; Rhapsody on a Theme of Paganini by Sergei Rachmaninoff choreo. by Sergey Petukhov | Tam Net Menja |
| 2020–21 | Singin' in the Rain by Arthur Freed & Nacio Herb Brown choreo. by Sergey Petukhov | I Giorni by Ludovico Einaudi; Songs My Mother Taught Me by Antonín Dvořák choreo. by Sergey Petukhov; Smile; Come Together performed by Michael Jackson choreo. by Sergey Petukhov | My Way by Aloe Blacc |
| 2019–20 | Singin' in the Rain by Arthur Freed & Nacio Herb Brown choreo. by Sergey Petukhov | I Giorni by Ludovico Einaudi; Songs My Mother Taught Me by Antonín Dvořák choreo. by Sergey Petukhov | Who Wants To Live Forever by Sarah Brightman; Tam Net Menja |
| 2018–19 | Tango: Verano Porteno by Astor Piazzolla, performed by Raul Garello | Suite in D "Air" Johann Sebastian Bach; Praeludium and Allegro (In the Style of Pugnani) by Fritz Kreisler | The Man I Love by Ella Fitzgerald |
| | Short dance | | |
| 2017–18 | Rhumba; Samba | Piano Concerto No. 2 Op. 18 by Sergei Rachmaninoff | Going to the Run by Golden Earrings |
| 2016–17 | Blues: Love Creole by Duke Ellington; Swing: It Don't Mean a Thing performed by Tony Bennett and Lady Gaga | Tango Ballet by Astor Piazzolla | Going to the Run by Golden Earrings |
| 2015–16 | Swan Lake by Pyotr Ilyich Tchaikovsky; Waltz; March; Polka | Io Ci Saro by Andrea Bocelli and Lang Lang | Grande Polonaise for Piano and Orchestra (from The Pianist) by Frédéric Chopin performed by Janusz Olejniczak |
| 2014–15 | Flamenco: Toitas las Mares by Manolo Caracol; Paso doble: The Dance by Michel Legrand | Did You Ever Feel Lonely; The Messiah Will Come Again by Gary Moore | Grande Polonaise for Piano and Orchestra (from The Pianist) by Frédéric Chopin performed by Janusz Olejniczak |

=== With Zhiganshin ===
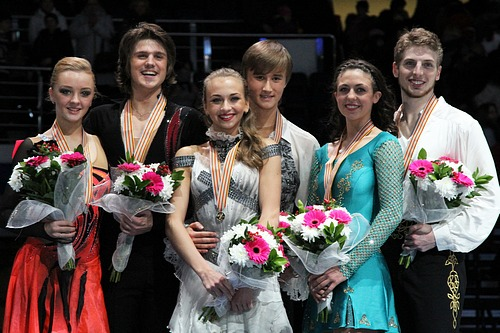
Sinitsina and Zhiganshin, gold medalists at the 2012 World Junior Championships

| Season | Short dance | Free dance | Exhibition |
|---|---|---|---|
| 2013–14 | Quickstep: Let the Good Times Roll; Swing: Swing Baby | Norma by Vincenzo Bellini choreo. by Ilia Averbukh | |
| 2012–13 | Tennessee Waltz by Eva Cassidy; Witch Doctor | Spiagge Lontane by Sergio Cammariere | Crazy by Aerosmith |
| 2011–12 | Manhã de Carnaval by Elizeth Cardoso; Bla Bla Cha Cha by Petty Booka | The Phantom of the Opera by Andrew Lloyd Webber | |
| 2010–11 | Algo pequeñito by Daniel Diges | Samson and Delilah by Camille Saint-Saëns; S'Apre Per Te Il Mio Cuore by Camille Saint-Saëns sung by Filippa Giordano | |
| | Original dance | | |
| 2009–10 | | Tango Of The Night (Noteo) by Pyotr Dranga; Weary Sun by Jerzy Petersburski | |

== Records and achievements ==
(with Katsalapov)

- Set the ice dancing record of the new +5 / -5 GOE (Grade of Execution) system for the free dance (120.46 points) at the 2018 CS Ondrej Nepela Trophy.
- They became the first team to score above 120 points in the free dance at the 2018 CS Ondrej Nepela Trophy.
- Became the first ice dance team to win the World Championship and the World Team Trophy in the same year.

== Competitive highlights ==
GP: Grand Prix; CS: Challenger Series; JGP: Junior Grand Prix

=== With Katsalapov ===
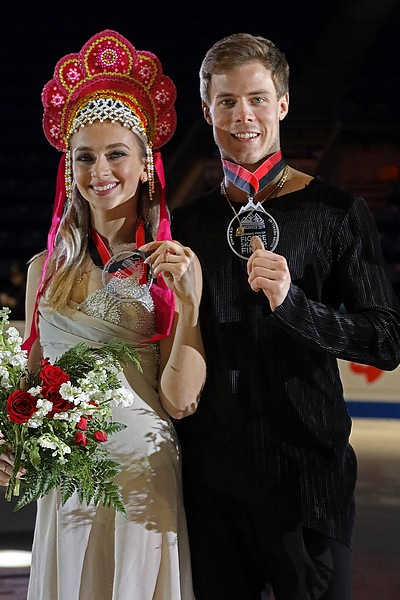
Sinitsina and Katsalapov at the 2018–19 Grand Prix Final

International
| Event | 14–15 | 15–16 | 16–17 | 17–18 | 18–19 | 19–20 | 20–21 | 21–22 |
|---|---|---|---|---|---|---|---|---|
| Olympics | | | | | | | | 2nd |
| Worlds | | 9th | | | 2nd | C | 1st | |
| Europeans | | 4th | 10th | | 4th | 1st | | 1st |
| GP Final | | | | | 2nd | 6th | | C |
| GP Cup of China | | | 4th | | | 1st | | |
| GP France | | | | | 2nd | | | |
| GP NHK Trophy | 7th | | 5th | 4th | | | | 1st |
| GP Rostelecom | 4th | 3rd | | | | 1st | 1st | 1st |
| GP Skate America | | 2nd | | 3rd | | | | |
| GP Skate Canada | | | | | 2nd | | | |
| CS Denis Ten MC | | | | | | | | WD |
| CS Ice Star | | | | 3rd | | | | |
| CS Nepela Trophy | | | | | 1st | 1st | | |
| Shanghai Trophy | | | | | | 1st | | |
National
| Russian Champ. | 4th | 2nd | 3rd | WD | 1st | 1st | WD | WD |
Team events
| Olympics | | | | | | | | 3rd T 2nd P |
| World Team Trophy | | | | | 3rd T 2nd P | | 1st T 1st P | |
TBD = Assigned; WD = Withdrew; C = Event eancelled T = Team result; P = Personal result. Medals awarded for team result only.

=== With Zhiganshin ===
International
| Event | 07–08 | 08–09 | 09–10 | 10–11 | 11–12 | 12–13 | 13–14 |
|---|---|---|---|---|---|---|---|
| Olympics | | | | | | | 16th |
| Worlds | | | | | | | 7th |
| Europeans | | | | | | | 4th |
| GP Cup of China | | | | | | 6th | |
| GP NHK Trophy | | | | | | | 8th |
| GP Rostel. Cup | | | | | | 3rd | |
| Universiade | | | | | | | 3rd |
| Volvo Open Cup | | | | | | 1st | |
| Ice Star | | | | | | | 2nd |
International: Junior
| Junior Worlds | | | | | 1st | | |
| JGP Final | | | | 2nd | 1st | | |
| JGP Austria | | | | 2nd | 1st | | |
| JGP Croatia | | | 5th | | | | |
| JGP Italy | | 6th | | | | | |
| JGP Poland | | | | | 1st | | |
| JGP U.K. | | | | 2nd | | | |
| JGP U.S. | | | 5th | | | | |
| NRW Trophy | | 2nd J | | | | | |
National
| Russian Champ. | | | | | | 5th | 3rd |
| Russian Junior | 12th | 7th | 6th | WD | 1st | | |
J: Junior level; WD: Withdrew

== Detailed results ==
Small medals for short and free programs awarded only at ISU Championships. At team events, medals awarded for team results only. ISU personal bests highlighted in bold.

=== With Katsalapov ===
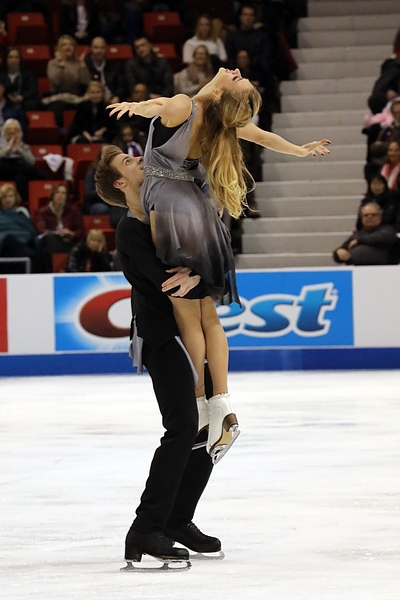
Sinitsina and Katsalapov at the 2017 Skate America

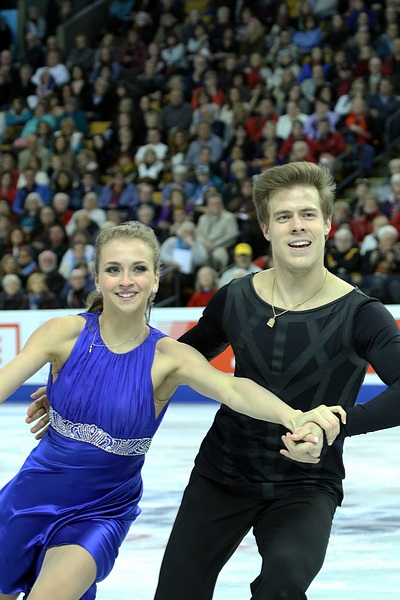
Sinitsina and Katsalapov at the 2016 World Championships

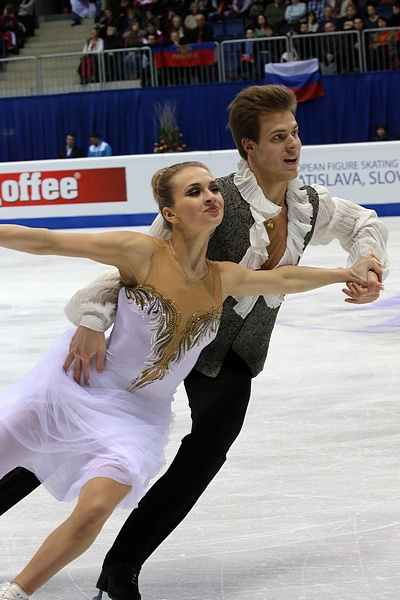
Sinitsina and Katsalapov at the 2016 European Championships

2021–22 season
| Date | Event | RD | FD | Total |
|---|---|---|---|---|
| 12–14 February 2022 | 2022 Winter Olympics | 2; **88.85** | 2; 131.66 | 2; 220.51 |
| 4–7 February 2022 | 2022 Winter Olympics – Team event | 2; 85.05 | 2; 128.17 | 3^{T} |
| 10–16 January 2022 | 2022 European Championships | 1; 87.89 | 1; 130.07 | 1; 217.96 |
| 21–26 December 2021 | 2022 Russian Championships | 1; 93.61 | WD | WD |
| 26–28 November 2021 | 2021 Rostelecom Cup | 1; 86.81 | 1; 124.91 | 1; 211.72 |
| 12–14 November 2021 | 2021 NHK Trophy | 1; 86.33 | 1; 129.11 | 1; 215.44 |
2020–21 season
| Date | Event | RD | FD | Total |
| 15–18 April 2021 | 2021 World Team Trophy | 1; 86.66 | 1; 130.15 | 1T/1P; 216.81 |
| 22–28 March 2021 | 2021 World Championships | 1; 88.15 | 1; **133.02** | 1; **221.17** |
| 26 Feb – 2 March 2021 | 2021 Russian Cup Final domestic competition | 1; 90.44 | 1; 132.68 | 1; 223.12 |
| 20–22 November 2020 | 2020 Rostelecom Cup | 1; 91.13 | 1; 126.38 | 1; 217.51 |
| 10–13 October 2020 | 2020 Cup of Russia Series, 2nd Stage, Moscow domestic competition | 1; 89.52 | WD | WD |
2019–20 season
| Date | Event | RD | FD | Total |
| 24–25 January 2020 | 2020 European Championships | 2; 88.73 | 1; 131.69 | 1; 220.42 |
| 24–29 December 2019 | 2020 Russian Championships | 1; 88.43 | 2; 132.31 | 1; 220.74 |
| 4–8 December 2019 | 2019–20 Grand Prix Final | 4; 81.51 | 6; 121.88 | 6; 203.39 |
| 15–17 November 2019 | 2019 Rostelecom Cup | 1; 86.09 | 1; 126.06 | 1; 212.15 |
| 8–10 November 2019 | 2019 Cup of China | 1; 85.39 | 2; 124.51 | 1; 209.90 |
| 3–5 October 2019 | 2019 Shanghai Trophy | 1; 86.77 | 1; 126.77 | 1; 213.54 |
| 19–21 September 2019 | 2019 CS Ondrej Nepela Memorial | 1; 78.44 | 1; 119.70 | 1; 198.14 |
2018–19 season
| Date | Event | RD | FD | Total |
| 11–14 April 2019 | 2019 World Team Trophy | 2; 84.57 | 2; 130.63 | 3T/2P; 215.20 |
| 18–24 March 2019 | 2019 World Championships | 2; 83.94 | 2; 127.82 | 2; 211.76 |
| 21–27 January 2019 | 2019 European Championships | 5; 70.24 | 3; 123.71 | 4; 193.95 |
| 19–23 December 2018 | 2019 Russian Championships | 1; 84.01 | 1; 128.31 | 1; 212.32 |
| 6–9 December 2018 | 2018–19 Grand Prix Final | 3; 77.33 | 2; 124.04 | 2; 201.37 |
| 23–25 November 2018 | 2018 Internationaux de France | 2; 77.91 | 2; 122.47 | 2; 200.38 |
| 26–28 October 2018 | 2018 Skate Canada | 2; 74.66 | 1; 120.51 | 2; 195.17 |
| 19–22 September 2018 | 2018 CS Ondrej Nepela Trophy | 1; 75.96 | 1; 120.46 | 1; 196.42 |
2017–18 season
| Date | Event | SD | FD | Total |
| 21–24 December 2017 | 2018 Russian Championships | 4; 68.46 | WD | WD |
| 24–26 November 2017 | 2017 Skate America | 3; 68.72 | 3; 107.81 | 3; 176.53 |
| 10–12 November 2017 | 2017 NHK Trophy | 4; 72.49 | 4; 104.66 | 4; 177.15 |
| 26–29 October 2017 | 2017 CS Minsk-Arena Ice Star | 3; 63.81 | 3; 101.49 | 3; 165.30 |
2016–17 season
| Date | Event | SD | FD | Total |
| 25–29 January 2017 | 2017 European Championships | 8; 64.67 | 12; 89.84 | 10; 154.51 |
| 22–25 December 2016 | 2017 Russian Championships | 3; 73.78 | 4; 104.67 | 3; 178.45 |
| 25–27 November 2016 | 2016 NHK Trophy | 4; 68.85 | 5; 100.77 | 5; 169.62 |
| 18–20 November 2016 | 2016 Cup of China | 4; 70.24 | 4; 101.70 | 4; 171.94 |
2015–16 season
| Date | Event | SD | FD | Total |
| 28 Mar – 3 April 2016 | 2016 World Championships | 9; 67.68 | 10; 101.29 | 9; 168.97 |
| 26–31 January 2016 | 2016 European Championships | 4; 68.33 | 4; 104.32 | 4; 172.65 |
| 23–27 December 2015 | 2016 Russian Championships | 1; 73.96 | 3; 101.87 | 2; 175.83 |
| 20–22 November 2015 | 2015 Rostelecom Cup | 3; 63.63 | 3; 103.77 | 3; 167.40 |
| 23–25 October 2015 | 2015 Skate America | 2; 62.76 | 2; 99.45 | 2; 162.21 |
2014–15 season
| Date | Event | SD | FD | Total |
| 25–28 December 2014 | 2015 Russian Championships | 4; 60.79 | 4; 97.78 | 4; 158.57 |
| 28–30 November 2014 | 2014 NHK Trophy | 5; 54.94 | 8; 67.37 | 7; 122.31 |
| 14–16 November 2014 | 2014 Rostelecom Cup | 4; 57.96 | 4; 89.59 | 4; 147.55 |

=== With Zhiganshin ===
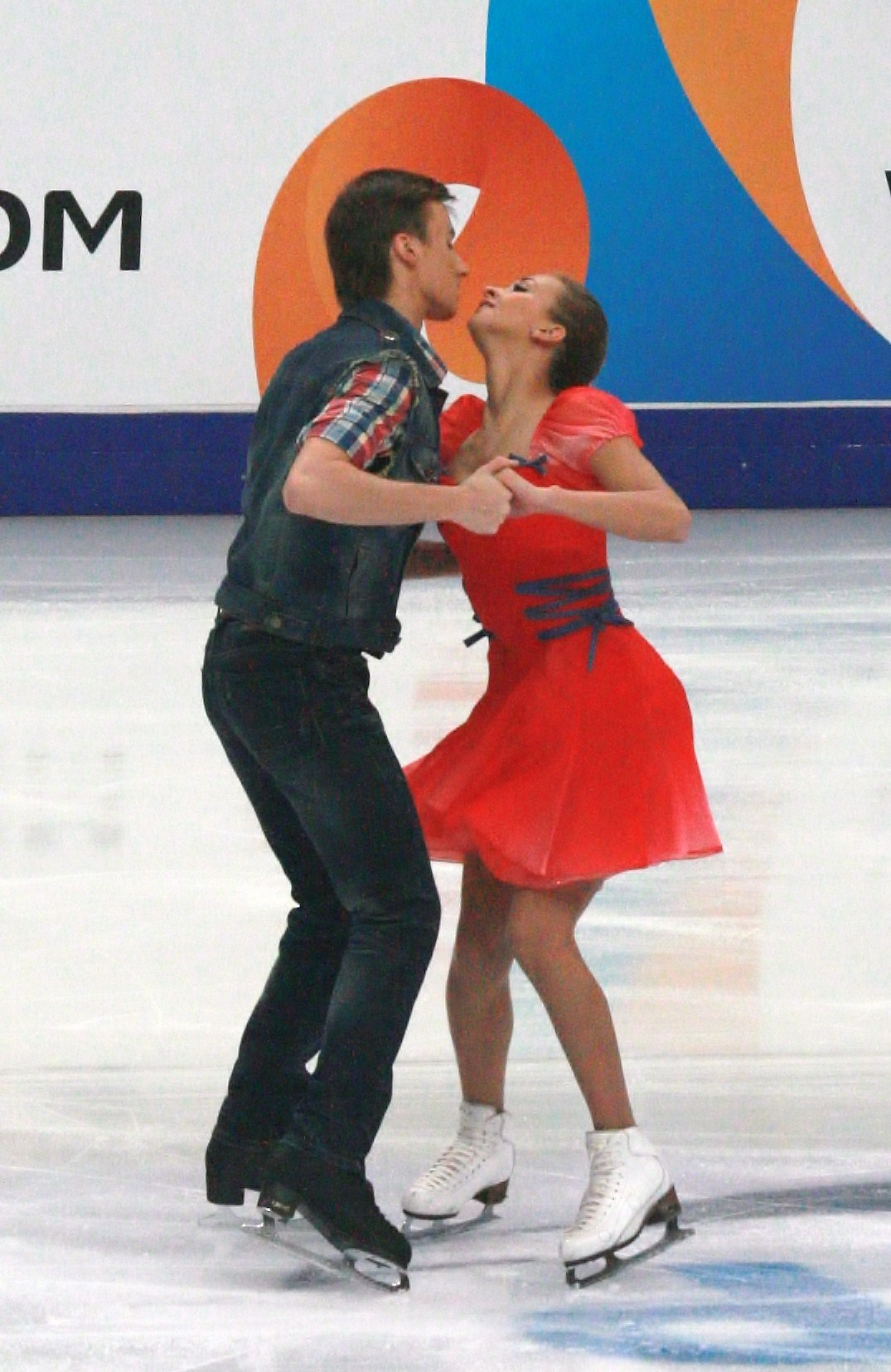
Sinitsina/Zhiganshin at the 2012 Rostelecom Cup

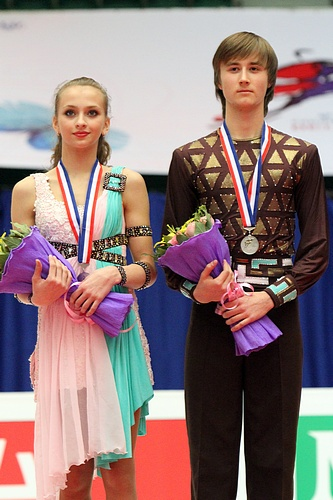
Sinitsina/Zhiganshin at the 2010–11 JGP Final

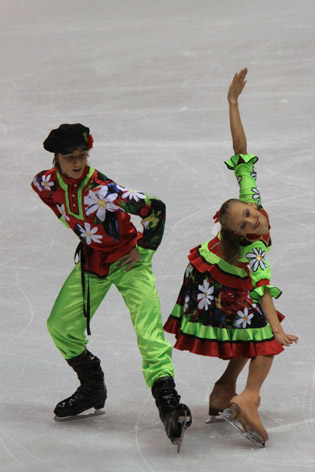
Sinitsina/Zhiganshin at the 2009 JGP Lake Placid

2013–14 season
| Date | Event | Level | SD | FD | Total |
|---|---|---|---|---|---|
| 24–30 March 2014 | 2014 World Championships | Senior | 8; 62.11 | 8; 93.24 | 7; 155.35 |
| 16–17 February 2014 | 2014 Winter Olympics | Senior | 16; 58.01 | 17; 82.65 | 16; 140.66 |
| 15–19 January 2014 | 2014 European Championships | Senior | 4; 60.63 | 4; 93.10 | 4; 153.73 |
| 24–25 December 2013 | 2014 Russian Championships | Senior | 3; 67.08 | 3; 98.52 | 3; 165.60 |
| 13–14 December 2013 | 2013 Winter Universiade | Senior | 2; 57.05 | 5; 85.45 | 3; 142.50 |
| 8–10 November 2013 | 2013 NHK Trophy | Senior | 8; 44.34 | 7; 79.89 | 8; 124.23 |
| 18–20 October 2013 | 2013 Ice Star | Senior | 2; 63.05 | 2; 97.17 | 2; 160.22 |
2012–13 season
| Date | Event | Level | SD | FD | Total |
| 10–13 January 2013 | 2013 Volvo Open Cup | Senior | 1; 64.67 | 1; 97.77 | 1; 162.44 |
| 25–28 December 2012 | 2013 Russian Championships | Senior | 4; 60.03 | 4; 93.94 | 5; 153.97 |
| 9–10 November 2012 | 2012 Rostelecom Cup | Senior | 3; 60.85 | 4; 84.23 | 3; 145.08 |
| 2–3 November 2012 | 2012 Cup of China | Senior | 6; 55.09 | 5; 82.37 | 6; 137.46 |
2011–12 season
| Date | Event | Level | SD | FD | Total |
| 27 Feb – 4 March 2012 | 2012 World Junior Championships | Junior | 1; 63.78 | 1; 90.03 | 1; 153.81 |
| 5–7 February 2012 | 2012 Russian Junior Championships | Junior | 1; 66.28 | 1; 91.95 | 1; 158.23 |
| 8–11 December 2011 | 2011–12 JGP Final | Junior | 1; 60.47 | 1; 87.06 | 1; 147.53 |
| 15–17 September 2011 | 2011 JGP Poland | Junior | 1; 56.83 | 1; 83.48 | 1; 140.31 |
| 8–10 September 2011 | 2011 JGP Austria | Junior | 1; 61.74 | 1; 89.36 | 1; 151.10 |
2010–11 season
| Date | Event | Level | SD | FD | Total |
| 9–12 December 2010 | 2010–11 JGP Final | Junior | 1; 55.58 | 2; 79.04 | 2; 134.62 |
| 1–2 October 2010 | 2010 JGP Great Britain | Junior | 2; 53.52 | 2; 80.34 | 2; 133.86 |
| 15–19 September 2010 | 2010 JGP Austria | Junior | 2; 50.46 | 2; 76.16 | 2; 126.62 |

2009–10 season
| Date | Event | Level | CD | OD | FD | Total |
|---|---|---|---|---|---|---|
| 3–6 February 2010 | 2010 Russian Junior Championships | Junior | 7; 31.25 | 5; 52.14 | 5; 77.12 | 6; 160.51 |
| 7–11 October 2009 | 2009 JGP Croatia | Junior | 4; 29.41 | 4; 45.38 | 5; 68.00 | 5; 142.79 |
| 2–6 September 2009 | 2009 JGP United States | Junior | 3; 29.87 | 7; 43.50 | 5; 69.03 | 5; 142.40 |
2008–09 season
| Date | Event | Level | CD | OD | FD | Total |
| 28–31 January 2009 | 2009 Russian Junior Championships | Junior | 7 – | 7 – | 7 – | 7; 147.35 |
| 31 Oct – 2 November 2008 | 2008 NRW Trophy | Junior | 2 – | 2 – | 1 – | 2; 146.93 |
| 3–7 September 2008 | 2008 JGP Italy | Junior | 7; 25.39 | 5; 43.74 | 6; 66.04 | 6; 135.17 |
2007–08 season
| Date | Event | Level | CD | OD | FD | Total |
| 30 Jan – 2 February 2008 | 2008 Russian Junior Championships | Junior | 12 – | 12 – | 12 – | 12; 126.93 |
