= Stanze =

Stanze may refer to:

- Raphael Rooms
- Stanze (album)
- Italian singular of stanza
