= Eden Roc =

Eden Roc may refer to:

- Hôtel du Cap-Eden Roc at Antibes on the French Riviera
- Eden Roc, Hawaii
- Eden Roc (album), a 1999 music album by the Italian pianist Ludovico Einaudi
- Eden Roc Miami Beach Hotel in Miami Beach, Florida
