= Diario Mali =

Studio album by Ludovico Einaudi and Ballaké Sissoko
- Released: 2003
- Recorded: February 2003
- Genre: Classical, world music
- Label: Sony Classical
- Producer: Titti Santini

Ludovico Einaudi chronology
I Giorni (2002)	Diario Mali (2003)	Una Mattina (2004)

Ballaké Sissoko chronology
Deli (2000)	Diario Mali (2003)	Tomora (2005)

Diario Mali is a collaboration album between Italian composer Ludovico Einaudi on piano and Malian musician Ballaké Sissoko on kora. It was released in Europe in 2003.

== Track listings ==
No.	Title	Length
1.	"Laissez-moi en paix"	4:02
2.	"Entre nous"	9:32
3.	"Soutoukou"	7:17
4.	"Chanson d'amour"	8:11
5.	"Chameaux"	5:04
6.	"Ma mère"	6:03
7.	"À l'ombre"	8:24
8.	"Niger Blues"	5:38
9.	"Mali Sajio"	8:00
10.	"Dessert dans le désert"	5:49
