= Djivan Gasparyan =

Armenian musician and composer (1928–2021)

Djivan Gasparyan PAA
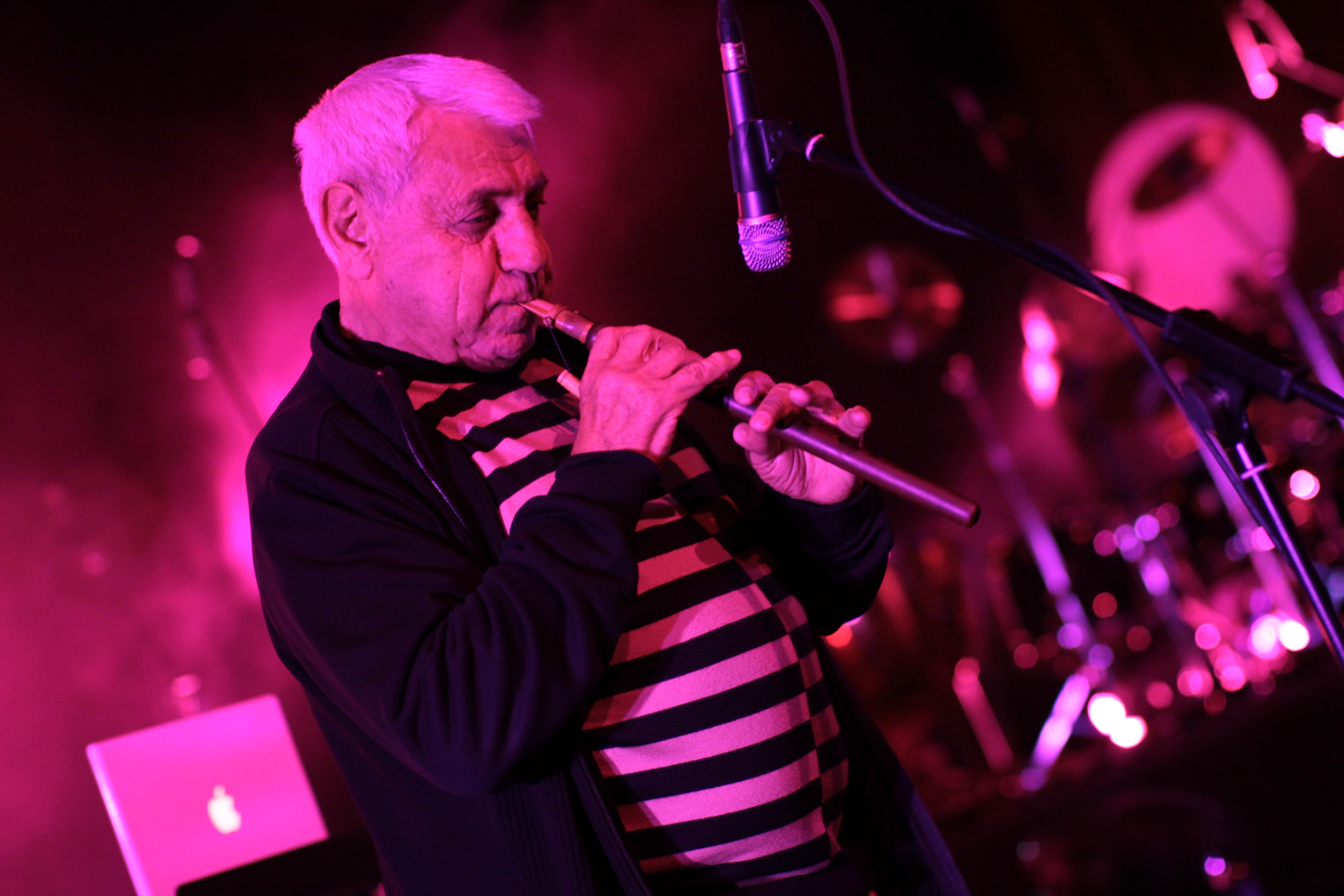
- Gasparyan in 2009

Background information
- Born: 12 October 1928; Solak, Armenian SSR, Transcaucasian SFSR, Soviet Union
- Died: 6 July 2021 (aged 92) Los Angeles, California, U.S.
- Genres: Armenian folk
- Occupations: Composer, score composer, musician
- Instrument: Duduk
- Years active: 1948–2021
- Label: All Saints Records

Djivan Gasparyan (var. Jivan Gasparyan; Armenian: Ջիվան Գասպարյան, Armenian pronunciation: [dʒiˈvɑn ɡɑspɑɾˈjɑn]; 12 October 1928 – 6 July 2021) was an Armenian musician and composer. He played the duduk, a double reed woodwind instrument related to the orchestral oboe. Gasparyan is known as the "Master of the duduk". In 1978 he was awarded the title People's Artist of the Armenian SSR, and in 2006 he was nominated for Grammy Awards for the Best Traditional World Music Album.

== Biography ==
Born in Solak, Armenia, to parents from Mush, Gasparyan started to play duduk when he was six. In 1948, he became a soloist of the Armenian Song and Dance Popular Ensemble and the Yerevan Philharmonic Orchestra.

He won four medals at UNESCO worldwide competitions (1959, 1962, 1973, and 1980). In 1973 Gasparyan was awarded the honorary title People's Artist of Armenia. In 2002, he received the WOMEX (World Music Expo) Lifetime Achievement Award. He is an Honorary citizen of Yerevan.

A professor at the Yerevan State Musical Conservatory, he instructed and nurtured many performers to professional levels of performance in duduk. In 1998, he released an album with a unique duduk quartet he formed. Creating arrangements for four musicians with "new duduk tones, alto and bass, was an extremely difficult task" and challenge, but the quartet did become a reality performing and "there is no other like it in the world", he witnessed in the liner notes of Nazeli. He toured the world several times with a small ensemble playing Armenian folk music. His music has been chosen on the soundtrack of several international films.

He collaborated with many artists, such as Sting, Peter Gabriel, Hossein Alizadeh, Erkan Oğur, Michael Brook, Brian May, Lionel Richie, Derek Sherinian, Roman Miroshnichenko, Ludovico Einaudi, Boris Grebenshchikov, Brian Eno, David Sylvian, Hans Zimmer, and Andreas Vollenweider. He also recorded with the Kronos Quartet and the Los Angeles Philharmonic.

Gasparyan played as part of the Armenian entry "Apricot Stone" by Eva Rivas at the 2010 Eurovision Song Contest in Oslo and became the oldest ever person to feature in a Eurovision Song Contest performance, but was not officially listed as a guest artist.

== Death ==
Gasparyan died on 6 July 2021, aged 92. It was announced by his grandson, Djivan Gasparyan Jr. He said "The world has suffered an unimaginable loss tonight. He was not only a legend, but also a person with a beautiful soul. I write with great sorrow about my huge loss. May God keep your soul in the bright sky."

Peter Gabriel, six time Grammy winner for the English rock band Genesis, called Gasparyan "the great master of the instrument." He added, "When he lifted his duduk to his lips he cast a spell over all who listened."

Gasparyan was highly recognized by the Armenian government. On his 90th birthday, Armenia's Prime Minister Nikol Pashinyan congratulated Gasparyan, stating: "Our people and music lovers around the world have already ranked you among the world’s great musicians. As a living legend, you are a credit to all Armenians." Upon his death, President Armen Sarkissian described him as a "legendary duduk player" who was "one of the pillars of our modern culture, whose name is associated with the creative and working activities of musicians, especially a whole generation of duduk players." Pashinyan called him "an exceptional Armenian intellectual and ranked him among the Greats of the world art; we were proud and inspired by him."

Catholicos Karekin II, leader of the Armenian Apostolic Church, sent a letter of condolences to his family. "For decades, he performed the gems of the Armenian music on many stages in Armenia and abroad, serving the grateful mission of recognizing and spreading our culture," read the statement.

== Legacy ==
Gasparyan collaborated with renowned composer Hans Zimmer in the making of the soundtrack for Ridley Scott's Oscar-winning film Gladiator, in which Zimmer said that Djivan was the only musician he truly wanted to play the “Armenian clarinet” for the soundtrack. The song used, "To Zucchabar," features Gasparyan's duduk - a sound that became one of the most memorable parts of the film's score.

Gasparyan won four gold medals in worldwide competitions organized by UNESCO, where he competed in 1959, 1962, 1973 and 1980. In the year 1973, he had the unique distinction of being the only musician to be bestowed the honorary title of People's Artist of Armenia.

Upon his passing in 2021, UNESCO wrote a tribute article in remembrance.

== Discography ==
- Duduk. Armenian folk songs (Мелодия / Melody, 1983) / I Will Not Be Sad in This World (All Saints Records, 1989)
- Moon Shines at Night (All Saints Records, 1993)
- Ask Me No Questions (Traditional Crossroads 4268, 1994)
- Apricots From Eden (Traditional Crossroads 4276, 1996)
- Salute (1998)
- Black Rock, with Michael Brook (Realworld 46230, 1998)
- Djivan Gasparyan Quartet - Nazeli (Libra Music 1998)
- Heavenly Duduk (Network 1999)
- Armenian Fantasies (Network 34801, 2000)
- Nazani (2001)
- Fuad, with Erkan Oğur (Traditional Turkish & Armenian songs) (2001)
- In My World, I Have No Pain (World Records - Parseghian Records, 2002)
- Endless Vision: Persian And Armenian Songs, with Hossein Alizadeh (World Village, Harmonia Mundi, 2005)
- Nectar for the Bitter World (2007)
- The Soul of Armenia (Network Medien's double-CD package 2008)
- Penumbra, with Michael Brook (Canadian Rational/bigHelium, 2008)

Collaborations as guest artist

- Dead Bees on a Cake, David Sylvian; (Gasparyan appears on the track 'Darkest Dreaming')
- Cosmopoly, as guest of Andreas Vollenweider (EDEL Records, SLG Records (USA/Canada))
- Naked Spirit, special guest of Sainkho, 1998
- Eden Roc, Ludovico Einaudi, (1999) (Gasparyan appears on 3 tracks)
- Free Fall, Jesse Cook (Narada, 2000) (Gasparyan appears on the track "Incantation")
- Blood of the Snake, Derek Sherinian (2006) (Gasparyan appears on the track "Prelude To Battle")
- RockPaperScissors, Michael Brook (EQR 0006, 2006) (Gasparyan appears on track "Pasadena part two")
- Pangea with Lian Ensemble (Houman Pourmehdi & Piraye Pourafar), Swapan Chaudhuri and Miroslav Tadić (Lian Records 118, 2006)
- Lightpost EP by The Apex Theory featuring Djivan Gasparyan (2007)

Selection of film soundtrack contributions

- The Crow, soundtrack (1994)
- The Siege, soundtrack (1998)
- Ronin, soundtrack (1998)
- Gladiator: More Music From the Motion Picture, soundtrack 2000
- Syriana, soundtrack (2005)
- Blood Diamond, soundtrack (2006)
- Samsara, soundtrack (2011) (as Dijan Gasparyan)
