= La Scala Concert 03.03.03 =

Live album by Ludovico Einaudi
- Released: 2004
- Recorded: 3 March 2003 at La Scala, Milan
- Genre: Classical
- Label: Sony Classical

La Scala Concert 03.03.03 is a 2003 Live album by Italian pianist and composer Ludovico Einaudi. As the title suggests it is a recording of a concert at the La Scala opera house in his adopted city Milan, Italy on 3 March 2003.

== Track listing ==
CD 1
No.	Title	Length
1.	"Melodia Africana 1"	02:30
2.	"I Due Fiumi"	06:08
3.	"In Un'altra Vita"	06:54
4.	"Stella Del Mattino"	02:32
5.	"I Giorni"	06:23
6.	"Limbo"	05:38
7.	"La Nascita Delle Cose Segrete"	04:40
8.	"Bella Notte"	05:57

CD 2
No.	Title	Length
1.	"Fuori Dalla Notte"	05:01
2.	"Al Di Là Del Vetro"	05:00
3.	"White Night"	03:02
4.	"La Linea Scura"	05:07
5.	"Giorni Dispari"	05:52
6.	"Passaggio"	05:52
7.	"Nefeli"	04:27
8.	"Password"	04:50
9.	"Questa Notte"	05:54
10.	"Julia"	04:53
11.	"Lady Jane"	03:54
12.	"Fuori Dal Mondo"	05:24
13.	"Le Onde"	06:39
