= Divenire =

Studio album by Ludovico Einaudi
- Released: November 7, 2006
- Genre: Contemporary classical
- Label: Sony Classical

Ludovico Einaudi chronology
Una Mattina (2004)	Divenire (2006)	Nightbook (2009)

"Ludovico Einaudi – Primavera"
Extract from 2007 album Divenire

Divenire (in English "to become") is an album by the Italian composer Ludovico Einaudi. Released in 2006, the album includes his critically acclaimed track "Primavera". Shortly after its release, Einaudi went on tour to various places in the UK, playing both the music on Divenire and orchestral arrangements of his most famous works to promote the album. It was recorded by the Royal Liverpool Philharmonic Orchestra, conducted by Robert Ziegler with the composer, Einaudi, as the piano master.

The 2011 film The Intouchables uses several Einaudi pieces in its soundtrack, including "Fly" and "L'origine nascosta".

== Track listing ==
No.	Title	Length
1.	"Uno"	3:47
2.	"Divenire"	6:46
3.	"Monday"	5:55
4.	"Andare"	6:57
5.	"Rose"	4:16
6.	"Primavera"	7:22
7.	"Oltremare"	11:00
8.	"L'origine nascosta"	3:11
9.	"Fly"	4:38
10.	"Ascolta"	4:48
11.	"Ritornare"	8:52
12.	"Svanire"	7:19

Bonus track
No.	Title	Length
13.	"Luce"	7:07

Deluxe edition bonus disc
No.	Title	Length
1.	"Uno (Mercan Dede Remix)"	4:08
2.	"Andare (Robert Lippok Remix)"	5:19
3.	"Divenire (Alva Noto Remodel)"	6:29

== Critical reception ==
Professional ratings
Review scores
Source	Rating
AllMusic	3.5/5 stars
Sputnikmusic	4.5/5 stars

The album has received positive reviews from music critics. AllMusic's James Manheim wrote "They (the tracks) are artfully done, stepping up to the line of pure schlock but not crossing over, and using the simplicity of minimalist patterns to rope audiences into something that's actually slightly different." Sputnikmusic gave the album 4.5 stars saying "Divenire is filled with piano compositions that capture the attention and emotions of listeners and probably won't give them back." Classic FM wrote that the title track is "A piece that builds from a simple piano chord sequence to a swirling hive of activity."

== Charts ==
=== Album ===
Chart (2006–17)	Peak position
Belgian Albums (Ultratop Flanders)	151
French Albums (SNEP)	137
Italian Albums (FIMI)	12

=== "Fly" ===
Chart (2011–14)	Peak position
France (SNEP)	52

== Certifications and sales ==
Region	Certification	Certified units/sales
Italy (FIMI) 2006-2009 sales	Gold	80,000
Italy (FIMI) sales since 2009	Gold	25,000^{‡}
United Kingdom (BPI)	Gold	100,000^{‡}
Summaries
Worldwide	—	300,000
^{‡} Sales+streaming figures based on certification alone.
