= Le Onde =

Le onde

Studio album by Ludovico Einaudi
- Released: 1996
- Genre: Classical
- Label: Sony Classical

Ludovico Einaudi chronology
Salgari (1995)	Le onde (1996)	Eden Roc (1999)

Le onde (Italian "The Waves") is an album released in 1996 by the Italian pianist Ludovico Einaudi. The album is based on the novel The Waves by British writer Virginia Woolf, and was Einaudi's first solo piano album. The album enjoyed mainstream success, particularly in Italy and the UK.

The inside of the CD booklet reads "If it were a story it would be set on the seafront of a long beach. A beach without beginning and without end. The story of a man who walks along this shore and perhaps never meets anyone. His gaze lingers occasionally to look at some object or fragment brought from the sea. The footprints of a crab or a solitary seagull. I always take the sand, the sky, some clouds, the sea. Only the waves change, always the same and different, smaller. larger. Shorter. Longer."

== Track analysis ==
=== Le onde ===
Le onde is a slow and flowing piece. Einaudi claimed that he wrote the piece "Le onde" when he was thinking of The Waves.

The piece is split into parts, with each part being repeated until the coda at the end which brings it to a close. It builds up texture incorporating a melody in the right hand and long fast arpeggios in the left. There is a distinctive chord pattern which repeats throughout the arpeggios. In the chorus there is a key change and the arpeggios change to incorporate new melodies and motifs.

== Track listing ==
No.	Title	Length
1.	"Canzone popolare (1500 ca.)"	0:57
2.	"Le onde"	4:55
3.	"Lontano"	4:49
4.	"Ombre"	5:23
5.	"La linea scura"	4:53
6.	"Tracce"	3:57
7.	"Questa notte"	5:10
8.	"Sotto vento"	7:02
9.	"Dietro l'incanto"	4:46
10.	"Onde corte"	3:22
11.	"La profondità del buio"	3:52
12.	"Passaggio"	4:46
13.	"L'ultima volta"	4:24

== Certifications ==
Region	Certification	Certified units/sales
Italy (FIMI) sales since 2009	Gold	25,000^{*}
United Kingdom (BPI) sales since 1998	Silver	60,000^{‡}
^{*} Sales figures based on certification alone.^{‡} Sales+streaming figures based on certification alone.
