= Nightbook =

Studio album by Ludovico Einaudi
- Released: 5 October 2009
- Genre: Contemporary classical music
- Length: 1:07:20
- Label: Sony Classical

Ludovico Einaudi chronology
Divenire (2006)	Nightbook (2009)	In a Time Lapse (2013)

Nightbook is an album created by Italian composer Ludovico Einaudi and released in 2009. The album saw Einaudi take a new direction with his music as he incorporated synthesized sounds alongside his solo piano playing. A new approach could be seen with tracks such as "Nightbook", and "Lady Labyrinth" where the element of percussion was utilized along the piano, acting as a driving force throughout the song. In Italy the album went Gold with more than 35,000 copies sold. Einaudi describes this album as "A night-time landscape. A garden faintly visible under the dull glow of the night sky. A few stars dotting the darkness above, shadows of the trees all around. Light shining from a window behind me. What I can see is familiar, but it seems alien at the same time. It's like a dream - anything may happen."

The title track "Nightbook" was used in the TV advertisement for the Channel 4 drama "Any Human Heart". The track "Lady Labyrinth" is often used as background music in Top Gear specials.

== Track listing ==
No.	Title	Length
1.	"In Principio"	2:51
2.	"Lady Labyrinth"	5:30
3.	"Nightbook"	5:50
4.	"Indaco"	5:21
5.	"The Snow Prelude N. 15"	4:28
6.	"Eros"	5:36
7.	"The Crane Dance"	3:05
8.	"The Snow Prelude N. 2"	4:08
9.	"The Tower"	4:40
10.	"Rêverie"	4:40
11.	"Bye Bye Mon Amour"	7:37
12.	"The Planets"	7:07
13.	"Solo" (Hidden track, also known as "Piste Sans Titre 13", which literally means "Untitled Track 13" in the Dutch release)	8:46

Bonus Track
No.	Title	Length
14.	"Berlin Song"	4:31

== Charts ==
Chart (2015)	Peak position
French Albums (SNEP)	131
Italian Albums (FIMI)	11

== Certifications and sales ==
Region	Certification	Certified units/sales
Italy (FIMI)	Gold	30,000^{*}
Summaries
Worldwide	—	750,000
^{*} Sales figures based on certification alone.
