= Solak, Armenia =

Solak Սոլակ
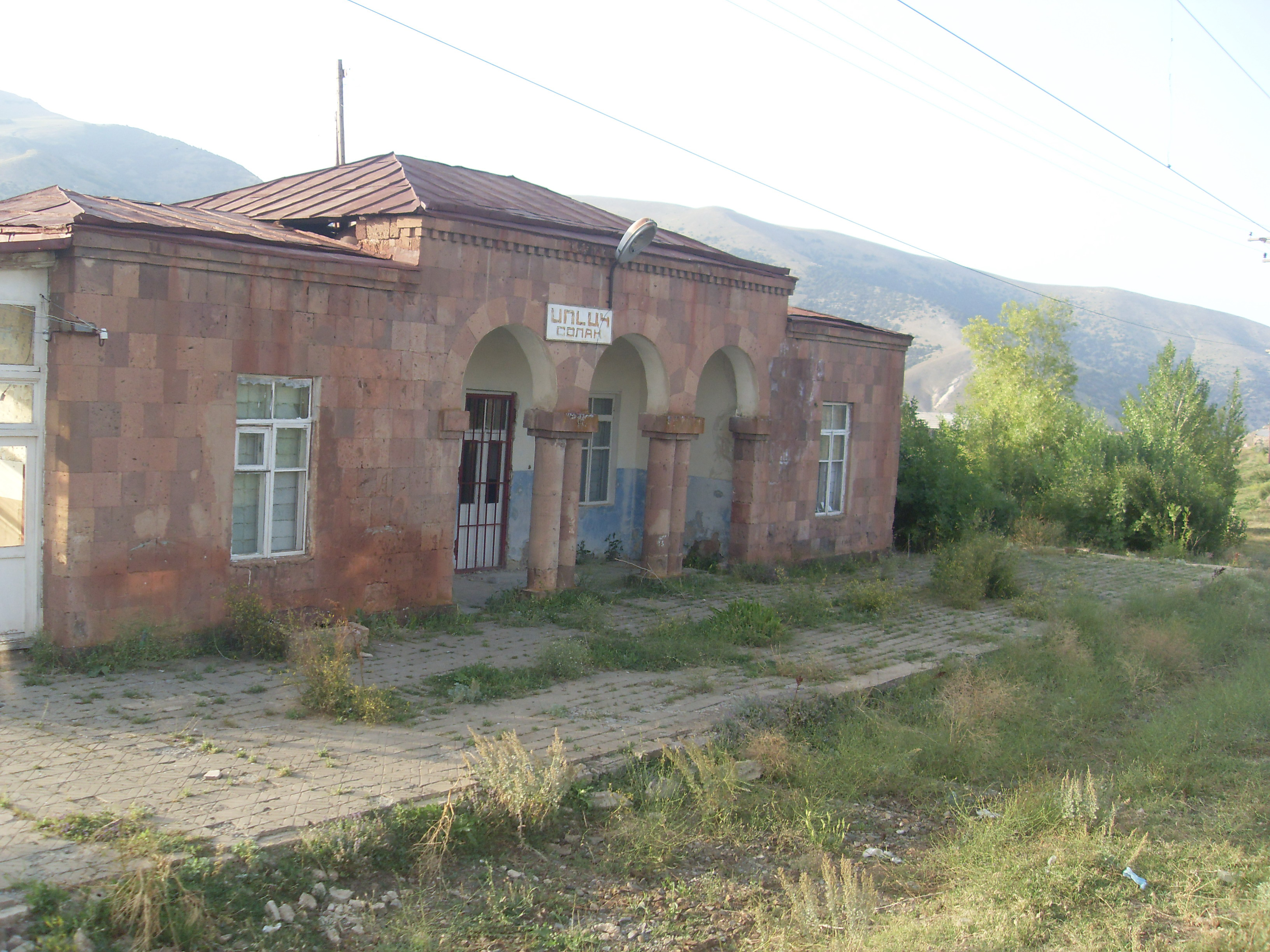
- Solak

- Location within Armenia
- Coordinates: 40°27′49″N 44°42′31″E
- Country: Armenia
- Province: Kotayk
- Elevation: 1,655 m (5,430 ft)

Population (2012)
  - Total: 2,756
- Area code: 022397

Solak (Armenian: Սոլակ) is a village in the Kotayk Province of Armenia. Solak is the birthplace of musician Djivan Gasparyan. The ancestors of the villagers came from Moush and Alashkert.

== See also ==
- Kotayk Province
