= In a Time Lapse =

Studio album by Ludovico Einaudi
- Released: 21 January 2013
- Genre: Contemporary classical music
- Label: Decca

Ludovico Einaudi chronology
Islands: Essential Einaudi (2011)	In a Time Lapse (2013)	Taranta Project (2015)

Ludovico Einaudi studio album chronology
Nightbook (2009)	In a Time Lapse (2013)	Taranta Project (2015)

In a Time Lapse is a studio album by Italian composer Ludovico Einaudi released on 21 January 2013. Two days before the release, on 19 January, Einaudi played live from his home in Milan solo arrangements of some of the music from In a Time Lapse through his official YouTube channel.

== Track listing ==
No.	Title	Length
1.	"Corale"	2:05
2.	"Time Lapse"	5:32
3.	"Life"	4:23
4.	"Walk"	3:28
5.	"Discovery at Night"	4:26
6.	"Run"	5:32
7.	"Brothers"	4:51
8.	"Orbits"	2:57
9.	"Two Trees"	6:26
10.	"Newton's Cradle"	7:53
11.	"Waterways"	4:18
12.	"Experience"	5:15
13.	"Underwood"	4:13
14.	"Burning"	5:00

Bonus tracks
No.	Title	Length
15.	"Bever"	4:01
16.	"The Dark Bank of Clouds"	3:11
17.	"Sarabande"	4:14
18.	"Ronald's Dream"	3:46
19.	"Corale Solo"	2:47

== Critical reception ==
Professional ratings
Review scores
Source	Rating
Classic FM	Positive
The Independent	4/5 stars
AllMusic	4/5 stars

In a Time Lapse has received positive reviews from music critics. According to a Classic FM review, "The Italian composer strikes gold once more with a haunting combination of dreamlike piano tunes and busy orchestral soundscapes." The Independent critic noted the "trancelike wave motion of tracks like 'Corale' and 'Run'" and "the more complex, layered pieces such as 'Life' ... cycling piano and glockenspiel against rhapsodic, flowing string lines", while also saying, concerning Einaudi's talent, that "there's a deeply satisfying emotional logic to his piano-based progressions that makes him as much the inheritor" of Frédéric Chopin and Erik Satie as of minimalists such as Philip Glass and Steve Reich. Writing for AllMusic, James Manheim described In a Time Lapse as an accessible entry point into Ludovico Einaudi’s catalog, noting its balance between minimalism, new age, and pop-influenced piano music.

== Charts ==
=== Weekly charts ===
Chart (2013–2026)	Peak position
Australian Albums (ARIA)	73
Austrian Albums (Ö3 Austria)	31
Belgian Albums (Ultratop Flanders)	22
Belgian Albums (Ultratop Wallonia)	63
Dutch Albums (Album Top 100)	2
French Albums (SNEP)	130
German Albums (Offizielle Top 100)	24
Italian Albums (FIMI)	5
New Zealand Albums (Recorded Music NZ)	40
Portuguese Albums (AFP)	25
Scottish Albums (Official Charts)	36
Spanish Albums (Promusicae)	55
Swiss Albums (Schweizer Hitparade)	18
UK Albums (Official Charts)	24
UK Classical Artist Albums (Official Charts)	1
US Traditional Classical Albums (Billboard)	7

=== Year-end charts ===
Chart (2013)	Position
Belgian Albums (Ultratop Flanders)	139
Dutch Albums (Album Top 100)	32

Chart (2015)	Position
Dutch Albums (Album Top 100)	96

== Certifications ==
Region	Certification	Certified units/sales
Austria (IFPI Austria)	Gold	7,500^{*}
Canada (Music Canada)	Gold	40,000^{‡}
Italy (FIMI)	Platinum	50,000^{‡}
Netherlands (NVPI)	Platinum	50,000^{^}
United Kingdom (BPI)	Gold	100,000^{‡}
^{*} Sales figures based on certification alone.^{^} Shipments figures based on certification alone.^{‡} Sales+streaming figures based on certification alone.
