= Luciano Chailly =

Italian composer (1920–2002

Luciano Chailly (Ferrara, 19 January 1920 – Milan, 24 December 2002) was an Italian composer and arts administrator of French descent. He was an eclectic and prolific composer in the post-war Italy, combining tonal, polytonal, and twelve-tone techniques. Grew up under fascism, Chailly remained apolitical and was a humanist. As he witnessed the brutality of war by serving in second World War, several compositions reflect his repudiation of war. Chailly was best known for his operas, many of which were composed to libretti by Dino Buzzati.

He was the father of conductor Riccardo Chailly, harpist and composer Cecilia Chailly, and journalist and film director Floriana Chailly.

== Life ==
Luciano Chailly graduated in violin in Ferrara in 1941; he pursued academic studies in literature at the University of Bologna in 1943 and composition at the Milan Conservatory with Renzo Rinaldo Bossi in 1945. He took further specialization classes in Salzburg with Paul Hindemith in 1948, from whom he drew his major musical influence.

From 1951 to 1967 he worked in the Rai branch of Milan as a chief music assistant, which put him in contact with prominent contemporary performers, including Maria Callas.

He met the writer Dino Buzzati in 1954. He wrote the opera libretti for five of his novels: Ferrovia soprelevata, Procedura penale, Il mantello, Era proibito, L'aumento. Chailly also wrote the music for some of his subjects: the ballet Fantasmi al Grand Hotel and the play Drammatica fine di un noto musicista.

From 1962, following the launch of Rai 2, he was appointed director of music programs, composing music for television dramas, including those based on the novels The Idiot of Fyodor Dostoevsky and Mastro-don Gesualdo of Giuseppe Verga, for documentaries and for films, such as Madre ignota directed by Gian Vittorio Baldi. In this period, he also composed the Missa Papae Pauli in honour of Pope Paul VI.

He had been the artistic director of Teatro alla Scala of Milan (from 1968 to 1971 and again from 1977), Teatro Regio of Turin (1972), the Angelicum of Milan (1973–1975), Verona Arena (1975–1976), Teatro Carlo Felice of Genoa (1983–1985) and of RAI National Symphony Orchestra of Turin (1989–1990).

In 1980, the London Sinfonietta commissioned him a work which resulted in the Newton Variations for orchestra. Subsequently, he set to music an adaptation of the play The Bald Soprano by Eugène Ionesco, staged at the Piccola Scala in the presence of Ionesco himself. His last work was a Te Deum for choir and orchestra, finished in 2001.
