= Una Mattina =

Una mattina

Studio album by Ludovico Einaudi
- Released: 6 September 2004
- Recorded: June 2004 at Piccolo Teatro (Milan)
- Genre: Contemporary classical music
- Length: 69:09
- Label: Sony Classical
- Producer: Ludovico Einaudi

Ludovico Einaudi chronology
La Scala Concert 03.03.03 (2004)	Una mattina (2004)	Divenire (2006)

Una mattina is a 2004 music album by Italian pianist Ludovico Einaudi.

== Background and composition ==
Einaudi described Una Mattina by saying:

If someone asked me about this album, I would say it is a collection of songs linked together by a story. But unlike my other albums, it doesn't belong to a time in the past. It speaks about me now, my life, the things around me. My piano, which I have nicknamed Tagore, my children Jessica and Leo, the orange kilim carpet that brightens up the living room, the clouds sailing slowly across the sky, the sunlight coming through the window, the music I listen to, the books I read and those I don't read, my memories, my friends and the people I love.

== Track listing ==
All tracks are written and produced by Ludovico Einaudi.

No.	Title	Length
1.	"Una mattina"	3:26
2.	"Ora"	7:57
3.	"Resta con me"	4:57
4.	"Leo"	5:10
5.	"A fuoco"	4:32
6.	"Dolce droga"	3:38
7.	"Dietro casa"	3:53
8.	"Come un fiore"	4:28
9.	"DNA"	3:43
10.	"Nuvole nere"	5:04
11.	"Questa volta"	4:35
12.	"Nuvole bianche"	5:57
13.	"Ancora"	12:09

== Charts ==
=== Album ===
Chart (2004–19)	Peak position
Belgian Albums (Ultratop Flanders)	200
Italian Albums (FIMI)	33

=== "Una mattina" ===
Chart (2011–14)	Peak position
France (SNEP)	49
Netherlands (Single Top 100)	97
Switzerland (Schweizer Hitparade)	73

== Certifications ==
Region	Certification	Certified units/sales
Germany (BVMI)	Gold	100,000^{‡}
Italy (FIMI)	Gold	25,000^{‡}
United Kingdom (BPI)	Gold	100,000^{‡}
^{‡} Sales+streaming figures based on certification alone.
