= Eden Roc (album) =

Studio album by Ludovico Einaudi
- Released: 1999
- Recorded: 16 June and 6–8 July 1999 at Piccolo Teatro Milan
- Genre: Classical
- Length: 64:28
- Label: Sony Classical
- Producer: Michelle and Luigi R. Colarullo

Ludovico Einaudi chronology
Le Onde (1996)	Eden Roc (1999)	I Giorni (2001)

Eden Roc (1999) is a music album by the Italian pianist Ludovico Einaudi. "Eden Roc" is the name of a number of localities and hotels around the world.

This album features strings by the Quartetto David and guest musician Djivan Gasparyan on duduk.

== Track listing ==
No.	Title	Length
1.	"Yerevan"	2:24
2.	"Eden Roc"	3:21
3.	"Fuori Dalla Notte"	4:57
4.	"Due Tramonti"	4:52
5.	"Nefeli"	4:11
6.	"Odessa"	5:47
7.	"Ultimi Fuochi"	4:04
8.	"Giorni Dispari"	5:13
9.	"Julia"	4:49
10.	"Fuori Dal Mondo"	4:57
11.	"Ultimi Fuochi II"	1:29
12.	"Un Mondo A Parte"	4:07
13.	"Password"	4:31
14.	"Yerevan II"	1:46
15.	"Exit"	8:00
