= Cecilia Chailly =

- Born: Cecilia Chailly; February 2, 1960 (age 66); Milan, Lombardy, Italy
- Genres: Acoustic music, film score contemporary classical music, new-age
- Occupations: Musician, composer
- Instrument: Harp,
- Labels: Emi, Warner, Egea, Sony Music, BMG Ricordi
- Website: www.ceciliachailly.com

Cecilia Chailly (born February 2, 1960) is an Italian harpist, composer, singer and writer.

== Biography ==
Chailly was born in Milan, Italy into a family of Romagnol and French descent. She is the daughter of the composer Luciano Chailly, and sister of the conductor Riccardo.

She studied musical composition with Azio Corghi at the musical conservatory in Milan. At the age of 19, she became first harp at La Scala. Afterwards, she collaborated with Giorgio Strehler's Piccolo Teatro and played in many concerts, culminating with her debut at the Queen Elizabeth Hall.

Along her career, she collaborated, among others, with John Cage, David Parsons, Mina, Andrea Bocelli, Fabrizio De André, Teresa De Sio, Giorgio Conte, Lucio Dalla, Ron, Morgan, Planet Funk, Gianni Morandi, Le Vibrazioni, Alex Britti, Hector Zazou.

She pioneered the use of the electric harp in Italy, performing the album Stanze (BMG Ricordi, 1992), composed by Ludovico Einaudi. Some of the tracks in the album were later used for the soundtrack of the film Fuori dal mondo (1999) by Giuseppe Piccioni.

In 1997, Chailly was awarded the Premio De Sica (De Sica Prize) for her album Anima (Warner, 1996), recorded in California in collaboration with David Darling, Andrea de Carlo and Mike Marshall. The same album was also played as the introduction to the concerts of Fabrizio De André's Anime Salve tour.

In 1998, Chailly published the novel Era dell'amore (Bompiani), later translated to German (Litz), for which she was awarded the Pisa (1998), Calabria Opera Prima (1998), Rapallo (1999) and Procida Elsa Morante Opera Prima (1999) prizes.

In 1999, Chailly played in Milan in honour of the Dalai Lama. In 2003, she played in front of Pope John Paul II on the occasion of the XVIII World Youth Day.

Some pieces played by Chailly were used in the soundtracks of the films Non ho sonno (2000) by Dario Argento and Mai più come prima by Giacomo Campiotti, and in several theatrical performance, as Felicità di una stella by Dario Moretti.

On March 12, 2000 Chailly took part in the concert Faber, amico fragile, held in memory of Fabrizio De André at Teatro Carlo Felice in Genova, playing Inverno (from the album Tutti morimmo a stento), which also marked her debut as a singer.

In October 2001 she produced the album AMA (Sony Columbia), for which she wrote music, lyrics and arrangements.

In 2006, she accompanied Ron at the Sanremo Music Festival with the song L'uomo delle stelle.

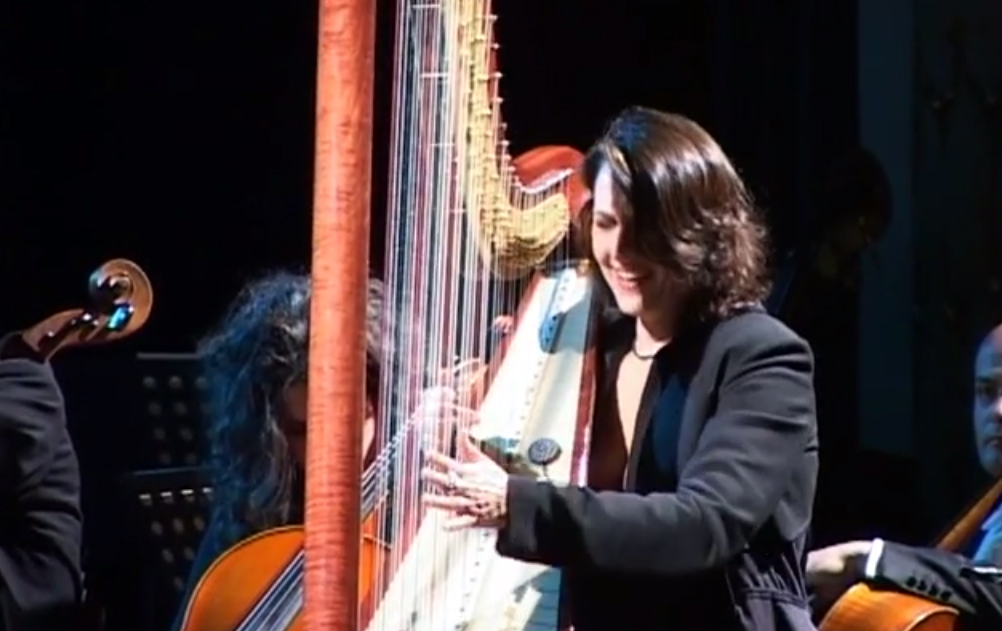
Cecilia Chailly plays with Orchestra del Teatro Cilea di Reggio Calabria – April 2009

In 2007 she recorded the album Alone (Emi), in which she played several acoustic instruments with the participation of Ludovico Einaudi at the piano.

In 2009 Chailly published Istanti (Egea), a crossover album mixing opera influences, Mediterranean melodies and blues inflections. In the same year, she played at the Teatro di Reggio Calabria four of her compositions for harp and orchestra.

In 2010, she was awarded the Profilo Donna international prize, whereas in 2012 she won the Rotary Donna and Harpo Marx prizes.

Invited by conductor Claude Nobs, she played at the 2013 Montreux Jazz Festival.

In 2013, she was a member of the quality jury at the Sanremo Music Festival. In the month of October of the same year, she published the album Le mie corde (Sony Classical), which contains a selection of her best acoustic harp songs in addition to the piece Varianti sulla scala enigmatica, composed by her father Luciano in 1995 and dedicated to her.

In 2014 "Stanze", the result of a close collaboration with Ludovico Einaudi, has been republished worldwide by Decca.

== Awards ==
- 1997 – Vittorio De Sica Prize;
- 1999 – Rapallo Opera Prima Prize;
- 1999 – Elsa Morante Opera Prima Prize
- 1999 – Reggio Calabria Opera Prima Prize;
- 2010 – Profilo Donna international Prize;
- 2012 – International Rotary Donna Prize;
- 2013 – Harpo Marx Prize;
- 2014 – Madesimo Prize;

== Novels ==
- 1997 – Era dell'Amore (Bompiani)

== Discography ==
=== Album ===
- 1997 – Anima (CGD East-West);
- 1992 – Stanze (BMG Ricordi|BMG), original score by Ludovico Einaudi;
- 2002 – Ama (Sony Music);
- 2006 – Alone (EMI Classics);
- 2009 – Istanti (Egea);
- 2013 – Le mie corde (Sony Classical);
- 2014 – Stanze (Decca), music by Ludovico Einaudi

=== Collaborations ===
- Ornella Vanoni (Duemilatrecentouno parole – CGD – 1981);
- John Cage (Postcard From Heaven – Ater);
- Mina (Ridi pagliaccio – PDU – 1988);
- Fabrizio De André (Anime salve – BMG Ricordi – 1996);
- Andrea Bocelli (Sogno – Sugar Music – 1999);
- Teresa De Sio;
- Giorgio Conte;
- Lucio Dalla;
- Gianni Morandi;
- Lucio Fabbri;
- Cristiano De André;
- Enzo De Caro;
- Giorgio Faletti;
- Planet Funk (The Illogical Consequence – EMI Music – 2005);
- Ron (Ma quando dici amore – Sony BMG – 2006);
- Morgan (Da A ad A – BMG Ricordi – 2007;
- Alex Britti (23 – Universal – 2009);
- Le Vibrazioni (Le strade del tempo – RCA – 2010);
- Eva Quartet & Hector Zazou (Elen Music – 2011), special guest featuring Laurie Anderson, Bulgara Group, Antoni Donchev, Robert Fripp, Bill Frisell, Ryūichi Sakamoto and others;

== Soundtracks participations ==
- Non ho sonno directed by Dario Argento;
- Mai più come prima directed by Giacomo Campiotti;
- Fuori dal mondo directed by Giuseppe Piccioni;

== Theater ==
- La Tempesta, di W. Shakespeare at Piccolo Teatro, directed by Giorgio Strehler (1978–79);
- Felicità di una stella show written by Dario Moretti (Teatro all'Improvviso);
- Saffo from Frammenti di Saffo, music and reading;
