= Riccardo Chailly =

Italian conductor (born 1953)

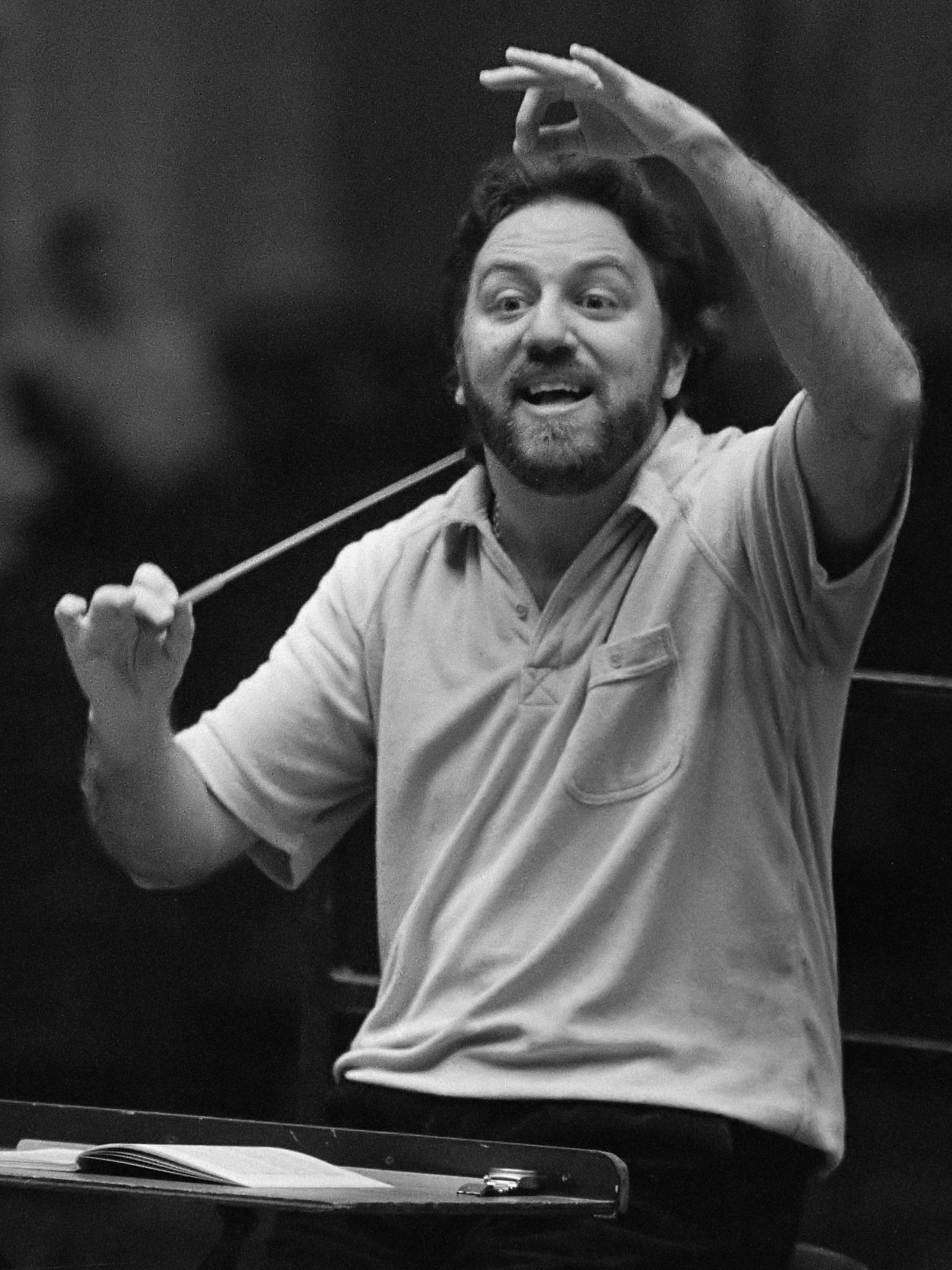
Chailly on 13 August 1986 conducting a rehearsal of the Royal Concertgebouw Orchestra

Riccardo Chailly OMRI (Italian pronunciation: [rikˈkardo ʃʃaˈ(j)i], French: [ʃɑji]; born 20 February 1953) is an Italian conductor. He is currently music director of the Lucerne Festival Orchestra and of La Scala. Prior to this, he held chief conducting positions at the Gewandhausorchester (2005–2016); the Royal Concertgebouw Orchestra (1988–2004); the Berlin Radio Symphony Orchestra (1982–1988); and the Teatro Comunale of Bologna (1986–1993). He was also the first musical director of the Orchestra Sinfonica di Milano Giuseppe Verdi (1999–2005) and principal guest conductor of the London Philharmonic Orchestra (1983–1986).

Born in Milan, Chailly first studied composition with his father, Luciano Chailly, in his youth. He continued with composition at the conservatories in Milan and Perugia, but later shifted to conducting under Piero Guarino and Franco Ferrara. He made his conducting debut at La Scala in 1978 with Massenet's Werther, where he had been assistant director to Claudio Abbado since 1973. Upon becoming principal conductor at the Royal Concertgebouw Orchestra, he embarked on performing standard symphonic works—particularly Bruckner and Mahler—but expanded the orchestra's previously minuscule 20th century and contemporary repertoire. For 30 years, Chailly has recorded exclusively with Decca.

== Biography ==
=== Early life ===
Chailly was born on 20 February 1953 into a musical family of Romagnol and French descent based in Milan. His father Luciano was a noted composer and arts administrator, holding positions at numerous Italian musical institutions, including as music director of La Scala. (Note: Luciano Chailly's art administrator positions—both as advisor or artistic director—include La Scala (1968–71; 1977), the Teatro Regio (1972), the Teatro Angelicum (1973–75), the Verona Arena (1975–76) and the Teatro Carlo Felice (1983) Luciano was also head of the music programs for the RAI Italian radio.) Luciano's oeuvre was centered on a neoclassical aesthetic, influenced by his former teacher Paul Hindemith, which granted him an epitaph as the "Italian Hindemith". Luciano Chailly married Riccardo's mother Anna Maria in 1950; Riccardo has two sisters, the harpist Cecilia Chailly and the television producer Floriana Chailly. Taken by his father to his first concert at age 6, Chailly quickly became obsessed with music, explaining in a 2002 interview by The Guardian: "I didn't do anything else, and always chose music over regular boyhood activities such as sports". Chailly studied composition with his father, took private piano lessons and played drums in The Nameless, a free jazz ensemble. Despite Chailly's musical enthusiasm, his father was reluctant to encourage him readily. He was disappointed by his son's lack of interest in the technical aspects such as musicology, his general mediocrity with instruments other than the drums and wanted to avoid any appearance of nepotism.

Chailly studied composition at the music conservatories in Milan and Perugia. He later switched to conducting, studying with both Piero Guarino and Franco Ferrara. In his youth, Chailly also played the drums in a rhythm-and-blues band.

At age 20, Chailly became assistant conductor to Claudio Abbado at La Scala, where he made his conducting debut in 1978 with Werther by Jules Massenet. From 1982 to 1988, Chailly was chief conductor of the Berlin Radio Symphony Orchestra and from 1983 to 1986 principal guest conductor of the London Philharmonic Orchestra. From 1986 to 1993, he led the Teatro Comunale of Bologna.

=== Career ===
Chailly made his debut with the Concertgebouw Orchestra, Amsterdam in January 1985. The orchestra announced his appointment as chief conductor in June 1985, effective with the 1988–1989 season. Chailly served as the orchestra's chief conductor from 1988 to 2004. In addition to performances of the standard symphonic tradition, notably Anton Bruckner and Gustav Mahler, he broadened the repertoire with 20th century and contemporary music. Among notable projects, Chailly led the 1995 Mahler Festival that celebrated the 100th anniversary of Mahler's first concert at the Concertgebouw. Chailly also conducted opera in Amsterdam, both at the RCO's annual Christmas Matinee concert as well as at De Nederlandse Opera (DNO), where his final opera production in Amsterdam was DNO's staging of Giuseppe Verdi's Don Carlo. One report stated that Chailly decided in 2002 to leave the RCO when, at his last contract negotiations, the orchestra offered him an extension for two years rather than five.

External audio
- You may hear Riccardo Chailly conducting the Gewandhaus Orchestra with Nelson Freire performing Johannes Brahms Piano Concerto No. 1 in D minor, Op. 15 in 2006; Here on archive.org
- You may hear Riccardo Chailly conducting the Gewandhaus Orchestra with Nelson Freire performing Johannes Brahms Piano Concerto No. 2 in B-flat Major, Op. 83 in 2006; Here on Archive.org

In 1986, Chailly conducted the Gewandhausorchester Leipzig for the first time, at the Salzburg Festival, after Herbert von Karajan had introduced Chailly to the orchestra. His next guest-conducting appearance with the Leipzig orchestra was in 2001, and after an additional appearance, he was named the 19th Kapellmeister of the orchestra. In August 2005, he officially became the chief conductor of the Gewandhausorchester Leipzig and general music director (GMD) of Oper Leipzig. His initial Leipzig contract was to run through to 2010. In May 2008, he extended his contract with the Gewandhausorchester to 2015. However, he concurrently resigned as GMD of the Oper Leipzig, reportedly after a conflict over the hiring of personnel without his consultation. In June 2013, the Gewandhausorchester and Chailly agreed on a further extension of his contract through 2020. However, in September 2015, the Gewandhausorchester announced the newly scheduled conclusion of Chailly's tenure as Gewandhauskapellmeister in June 2016, four years ahead of the previously agreed upon contract extension, at Chailly's request. His projects in Leipzig have included an international Mahler festival in May 2011, featuring 10 different orchestras.

Chailly became the first music director of the Orchestra Sinfonica di Milano Giuseppe Verdi (La Verdi) in 1999 and held the post until 2005. He now has the title of Conductor Laureate with La Verdi. In December 2013, La Scala announced the appointment of Chailly as its next music director, starting in 2017. His most recent La Scala contract extension was through 2026. Chailly is scheduled to stand down as music director of La Scala at the close of 2026.

In August 2015, the Lucerne Festival Orchestra announced the appointment of Chailly as its next music director, effective with the 2016 Lucerne Festival, with an initial contract of 5 years. In February 2021, the orchestra announced an extension of Chailly's contract through 2026. In December 2025, the orchestra announced a further extension of Chailly's contract through the end of 2028.

== Recordings ==
Chailly has an exclusive recording contract with Decca, and his recordings with Decca include complete cycles of the symphonies of Johannes Brahms, Gustav Mahler and Anton Bruckner. His Brahms cycle with the Gewandhausorchester won the 2014 Gramophone Award for Recording of the Year. Other notable achievements include recordings of Igor Stravinsky, Edgard Varèse and Paul Hindemith. More recently, with the Gewandhaus Orchestra, Chailly has led recordings of Felix Mendelssohn, Johann Sebastian Bach, Brahms, Robert Schumann's symphonies in the re-orchestrations by Mahler, and a complete cycle of Beethoven's symphonies. His past recordings with American orchestras included Shostakovich: The Dance Album with the Philadelphia Orchestra and Stravinsky's Le Sacre du printemps with the Cleveland Orchestra.

== Personal life ==
Chailly has been married twice. His first marriage was in 1974 to Anahi Carfi, an Argentinian-Italian violinist, with whom he had a daughter that year; the couple divorced two years later. He married Gabriella Terragni in 1982, from whom he has a stepson.

Earlier in his life, Chailly was an avid partaker in extreme sports, including motorbiking, speedboating and parasailing. However, after he and his stepson were involved in a serious accident in 1985, Chailly abandoned these activities.

== Awards ==
- 2003: Feltrinelli Prize

== Sources ==
- Matheopoulos, Helena (1982). Maestro: Encounters with Conductors of Today. New York: Harper & Row. ISBN 978-0-06-015103-4. OCLC 8929684.

Cultural offices
Preceded by Lorin Maazel	Principal Conductor, Radio-Symphonie-Orchester Berlin; 1982–1989	Succeeded by Vladimir Ashkenazy
Preceded by (no predecessor)	Music Director, Orchestra Sinfonica di Milano Giuseppe Verdi; 1999–2005	Succeeded by Xian Zhang
Preceded by Claudio Abbado	Music Director, Lucerne Festival Orchestra; 2016–present	Succeeded by incumbent
Preceded by Daniel Barenboim	Principal Conductor and Music Director, La Scala, Milan; 2015–present	Succeeded by incumbent
