= Stanze (album) =

Studio album by Ludovico Einaudi
- Released: 1992
- Genre: Classical
- Label: Sony Classical

Ludovico Einaudi chronology
| Time Out (1988) | Stanze (1992) | Salgari (1995) |

Stanze is the second studio album by Italian contemporary classical music composer Ludovico Einaudi, released in 1992. The tracks, written for electric harp, are all performed by Cecilia Chailly.

== Track listing ==
| No. | Title | Length |
|---|---|---|
| 1. | "Notte" | 4:22 |
| 2. | "Calore" | 3:40 |
| 3. | "Moto" | 2:25 |
| 4. | "Calmo" | 4:33 |
| 5. | "Vega" | 4:34 |
| 6. | "Onda" | 4:02 |
| 7. | "Contatti" | 3:15 |
| 8. | "Respiro" | 4:00 |
| 9. | "Lento" | 3:49 |
| 10. | "Attesa" | 3:29 |
| 11. | "Cadenza" | 3:10 |
| 12. | "Orbite" | 3:21 |
| 13. | "Moto perpetuo" | 2:34 |
| 14. | "Cerchio" | 1:53 |
| 15. | "Ritorno" | 2:24 |
| 16. | "Notte" | 4:16 |
