= Ludovico Einaudi =

Italian pianist and composer (born 1955)

Ludovico Einaudi OMRI
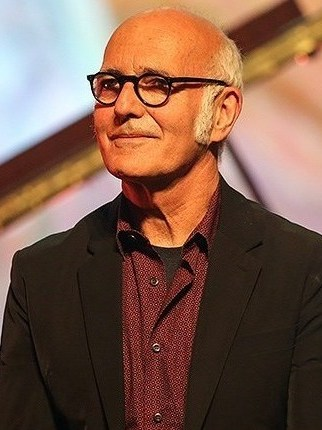
- Einaudi in 2018

Background information
- Born: Ludovico Maria Enrico Einaudi; 23 November 1955 (age 70); Turin, Italy
- Genres: Minimalist music; film score; contemporary classical music; new-age music
- Occupations: Musician, composer
- Instruments: Piano; synthesizer; keyboard; guitar
- Years active: 1980–present
- Labels: Decca; Deutsche Grammophon; Universal; Ponderosa Music and Art (US, FR)
- Website: ludovicoeinaudi.com

Ludovico Maria Enrico Einaudi OMRI (Italian: [ludoˈviːko eiˈnaudi]; born 23 November 1955) is an Italian pianist and composer. Trained at the Conservatorio Verdi in Milan, Einaudi began his career as a classical composer, later incorporating other styles and genres such as pop, rock, folk, and world music.

Einaudi has composed the scores for a number of films and television productions, including This Is England, The Intouchables, I'm Still Here, the TV series Doctor Zhivago, and Acquario (1996), for which he won the Grolla d'oro. His music was used as the score for the Golden Globe and Academy Award-winning films Nomadland and The Father.

He has also released a number of solo albums for piano and other instruments, notably I Giorni in 2001, Nightbook in 2009, and In a Time Lapse in 2013. On 1 March 2019, Einaudi announced a seven-part project named Seven Days Walking, which was released over the course of seven months in 2019.

In 2005, he was appointed an Officer of the Order of Merit of the Italian Republic.

== Early life and education ==
Einaudi was born in Turin, Piedmont. His father, Giulio Einaudi, was a publisher working with authors including Italo Calvino and Primo Levi, and founder of Giulio Einaudi Editore. His paternal grandfather, Luigi Einaudi, was President of Italy between 1948 and 1955. His mother, Renata Aldrovandi, played the piano to him as a child. Her father, Waldo Aldrovandi, was a pianist, opera conductor, and composer who emigrated to Australia after World War II.

Einaudi started composing music as a teenager, first writing by playing a folk guitar. He began his musical training at the Conservatorio Verdi in Milan, obtaining a diploma in composition in 1982. That same year he took an orchestration class taught by Luciano Berio and was awarded a scholarship to the Tanglewood Music Festival. According to Einaudi, "Luciano Berio did some interesting work with African vocal music and did some arrangements of Beatles songs, and he taught me that there is a sort of dignity inside music. I learnt orchestration from him and a very open way of thinking about music." He also learned by collaborating with musicians such as Ballaké Sissoko from Mali and Djivan Gasparyan from Armenia. His music is ambient, meditative, and often introspective, drawing on minimalism and contemporary pop.

== Music career ==
=== 1980s ===
After studying at the conservatory in Milan and subsequently with Berio, Einaudi spent several years composing in traditional forms, including several chamber and orchestral pieces. He soon garnered international attention and his music was performed at venues such as the Teatro alla Scala, the Tanglewood Music Festival, Lincoln Center, and the UCLA Center for Performing Arts.

In the mid-1980s, he began to search for more personal expression in a series of works for dance and multimedia, and later for piano.

Some of his collaborations in theatre, video, and dance included compositions for the Sul filo d'Orfeo in 1984, Time Out in 1988, a dance-theatre piece created with writer Andrea De Carlo, The Wild Man in 1990, and the Emperor in 1991. Later collaborations include Salgari (Per terra e per mare) (1995), an opera/ballet commissioned by the Arena di Verona with texts by Emilio Salgari, Rabindranath Tagore, and Charles Duke Jr, and E.A. Poe (1997), which was conceived as a soundtrack for silent films.

=== Soundtracks ===
Einaudi began using his style to compose film soundtracks in the mid-1990s. He started with two films by Michele Sordillo, Da qualche parte in città in 1994 and Acquario in 1996, for which he won the Grolla d'oro for best soundtrack. In 1998, he composed the soundtrack for Treno di panna and the score for Giorni dispari by Dominick Tambasco.

In 2000, he collaborated with Antonello Grimaldi on Un delitto impossibile, and he also composed the soundtrack for Fuori del mondo, for which he won the Echo Klassik award in Germany in 2002. After the release of his debut album, some excerpts were included in the film Aprile by Nanni Moretti. In 2002, his soundtrack for Luce dei miei occhi was named best soundtrack at the 2002 Italian Music Awards.

In 2002, Einaudi won an Italian award for Best Film Score for Luce dei miei occhi. AllMusic gave his score for the 2002 TV serial Doctor Zhivago 4.5/5 stars and published a glowing review, comparing it in skill to Maurice Jarre's score of the previous film adaptation.

In 2004, his soundtrack for Sotto falso nome received the prize for the best film music at the Avignon Film Festival.

In 2010, Einaudi wrote the music for the trailer of Black Swan. His "Due Tramonti" was featured in the film I'm Still Here (2010), directed by Casey Affleck. His composition "Nuvole Bianche" was featured in the film Insidious (2010), directed by James Wan, the British TV drama This Is England 86, and in the TV series Derek (2012), directed by and starring Ricky Gervais. To The Intouchables (2011), the biggest box office movie in French history, he contributed the tracks "Fly", "Writing Poems", "L'origine nascosta", "Cache-cache", "Una Mattina", and "Primavera." The film This Is England featured Fuori dal mondo and Dietro casa. The British TV drama series This Is England '88 also contained the tracks "Fuori Dalla Notte", "Solo" (a bonus track from Nightbook), "Berlin Song", and "Distacco".

=== Solo releases ===
Einaudi is signed to Decca Records and is published by Chester Music Limited, part of the Music Sales Group of Companies.

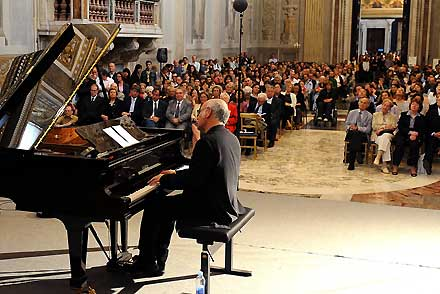
Ludovico Einaudi at Quirinal Palace in 2008

After the multi-media-inspired Time Out in 1988, in 1992 he released Stanze, which he had composed for harp. The album was performed by Cecilia Chailly, one of the first musicians to use an electric harp. Einaudi released his first solo piano album, Le Onde, in 1996, under BMG. The album is based on the novel The Waves by British writer Virginia Woolf, and enjoyed mainstream success, particularly in Italy and the UK. His 1999 followup, Eden Roc, was also released on BMG, with shorter pieces. For the project he collaborated with the Armenian duduk musician Djivan Gasparyan.

His next solo piano release, I Giorni (2001), was inspired by his travels in Africa. The solo piano track "I Giorni" was featured in a BBC promotion for arts and culture programs, and attracted much interest due to Greg James' airing of the piece on BBC Radio 1 in June 2011. James mentioned that he found the piece therapeutic when he was studying at university. Due to repeated airings that month, the track entered the UK Singles Chart at No. 32 on 12 June 2011.

Excerpt from "Ludovico Einaudi – Primavera"
Extract from 2007 album "Divenire"

In 2003, Einaudi released the live album La Scala Concert 03.03.03, which was recorded at the famous La Scala opera house in Milan. His 2003 album Diario Mali is another collaboration, with Einaudi on piano and Malian musician Ballaké Sissoko on kora. In 2004, Einaudi released the album Una Mattina on Decca Records. The 2006 album Divenire consists of piano accompanied by orchestra. The album also includes the artist's critically acclaimed track "Primavera." It was recorded by the Royal Liverpool Philharmonic Orchestra, with Einaudi as the piano master. Shortly after its release, Einaudi went on tour to various places in the UK, playing both the music on Divenire and orchestral arrangements of his other works. The album topped the iTunes classical chart.

In October 2009, Nightbook was released. The album saw Einaudi take a new direction with his music as he incorporated synthesized sounds alongside his piano. The album was conceived and recorded in response to the German painter and sculptor Anselm Kiefer, as well as an exhibit space where Einaudi performed for a gallery opening for Kiefer. It was also inspired by the drums and electronics of the Whitetree Project, a performing trio Einaudi formed with Robert and Ronald Lippok of To Rococo Rot, a German electronic group. In Italy, the album went Gold with more than 35,000 copies sold.

Einaudi's album In a Time Lapse was released on 21 January 2013, with US and Canadian supporting tours. He also appeared on KCRW in Los Angeles. On 17 September 2013, Einaudi performed various songs from In a Time Lapse, together with a new ensemble, at the annual iTunes Festival held at the Roundhouse in London. The group intimately rehearsed this performance in the barn of Einaudi's house. In March 2016, the world premiere of a new piano concerto, "Domino", took place at the Royal Liverpool Philharmonic Orchestra.

== Style ==
Einaudi's music is generally characterised by minimalist structures and repetitive melodic patterns, with the piano being his primary medium. Among his influences are composers such as Karlheinz Stockhausen and Luciano Berio. Einaudi has described an interest in exploring connections between classical composition and other musical traditions, reflecting a broader aim to create music that is direct and emotionally accessible to a wide audience. In an interview with Classic FM, he expressed a desire to collaborate with Eminem, noting that his style would complement the rapper's voice well.

Einaudi's musical style has contributed to significant commercial success and a broad international fan base. He has been described as one of the most-streamed classical artists worldwide, with recordings that attract listeners beyond traditional classical music audiences. He is popular, especially among learners, selling accompanying scores to his albums and being cited as an inspiration to many who take up the piano. His music has sometimes attracted criticism within the classical establishment, yet it has also achieved a rare level of popularity for contemporary instrumental composition, with some critics attributing this divide to the perceived simplicity and ubiquity of his music.

In a review of Elements, Classicalite's Steve Nagel writes that "because Einaudi errs so much on the side of minimalism and pop that it might be more appropriate to label his music as a product of the New Age movement, which—although seemingly less ambitious than broader classical structures—concentrates more on relaxation, cohesion, elements of nature and an air of optimism". Ben Beaumont-Thomas of The Guardian, in an unfavorable review of a 2016 live performance, critiques Einaudi the performer with "[he] casts himself as the antithesis to the stuffy conservatoire—but then plays music that is less adventurous than your average indie band's", complaining that "Einaudi compounds this by being a mediocre pianist. He can finesse a phrase, but is proudly anti-virtuosic, playing only simple arpeggios and limpid four-note melodies".

== Personal life ==
In 2016, Einaudi participated in the Greenpeace campaign to save the Arctic.

== Discography ==
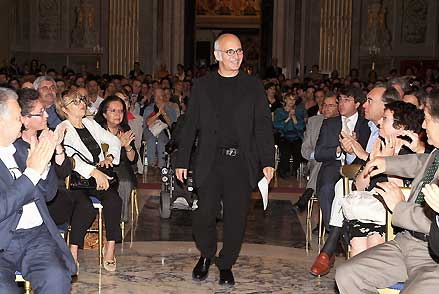
Einaudi in 2008

=== Studio albums ===
- Time Out (various instruments; experimental) (1988)
- Stanze (harp) (1992)
- Salgari (various instruments; ballet) (1995)
- Le Onde (piano) (1996)
- Eden Roc (piano and strings) (1999)
- I Giorni (piano) (2001)
- Diario Mali (piano, kora) (2003)
- Una Mattina (piano, cello) (2004)
- Divenire (piano, string orchestra, electronic) (2006)
- Nightbook (piano, electronic) (2009)
- In a Time Lapse (piano, electronic) (2013)
- Taranta Project (piano, electronic, orchestra, cello, kora) (2015)
- Elements (piano, electronic, orchestra) (2015)
- Seven Days Walking (piano, violin, viola, cello) (2019)
- 12 Songs from Home (piano) (2020)
- Underwater (piano) (2022)
- The Summer Portraits (piano, string orchestra) (2025)
- Solo Piano (2026)

=== Live albums ===
- La Scala Concert 03.03.03 (2003)
- Live in Berlin (2007)
- iTunes Festival: London 2007 (2007)
- Live in Prague (2009)
- The Royal Albert Hall Concert (2010)
- La notte della Taranta 2010 (2011)
- iTunes Festival: London 2013 (2013)
- In a Time Lapse Tour (2014)
- Elements, Special Tour Edition (2016)

=== Compilations ===
- Echoes: The Einaudi Collection (2003)
- I primi capolavori (2010)
- Islands: Essential Einaudi (2011)
- Einaudi Essentiel (2012)
- Undiscovered (2020)
- Cinema (2021)
- Moments of Peace (2023)
- Music of Care (2023)
- Undiscovered II (2023)

=== Remixes ===
- Table Vs Ludovico Einaudi (2002)
- Elements, Remixes (2016)

=== Singles ===
- "Ultimi Fuochi" (1998)
- "Blusound" (2001)
- "Night" (2015)
- "Elements" (2015)
- "Drop" (2015)
- "Elegy for the Arctic" (2016)
- "Luminous" (2021)
- "Rose Bay" (2024)

=== With Whitetree ===
- Cloudland (2009)

=== Film and television scores ===
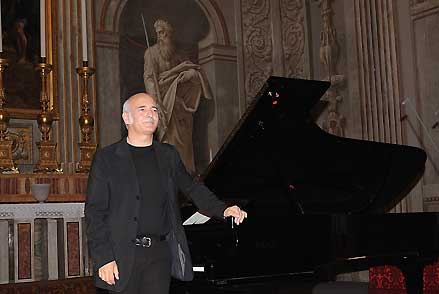
Einaudi at a solo performance in 2008

- Treno di panna (Director: Andrea De Carlo) (1988)
- Da qualche parte in città (Director: Michele Sordillo) (1994)
- Acquario (Director: Michele Sordillo) (1996)
- Aprile (Director: Nanni Moretti) (1998)
- Giorni dispari (Director: Dominick Tambasco) (1998)
- Fuori dal mondo (Director: Giuseppe Piccioni) (1999)
- La vita altrui (Director: Michele Sordillo) (2000)
- Un delitto impossibile (Director: Antonio Luigi Grimaldi) (2000)
- Le parole di mio padre (Director: Francesca Comencini) (2001)
- Alexandreia (Director: Maria Iliou) (2001)
- Luce dei miei occhi (Director: Giuseppe Piccioni) – Italian music award for best film score (2002)
- Doctor Zhivago (TV mini-series, Director: Giacomo Campiotti) (2002)
- Sotto falso nome (Director: Roberto Andò) – Prize for the best film music at Avignon Film Festival 2004 (2004)
- Mission: Saturn (2004)
- This Is England (Director: Shane Meadows) (2006)
- This Is England '86 (Director: Shane Meadows) (2010)
- Stargate Universe – Pathogen (2010)
- Sangandaan – Landas ng Buhay (2010)
- I'm Still Here (Director: Casey Affleck) (2010)
- Das Ende ist mein Anfang – German film (2010)
- Black Swan trailer (Director: Darren Aronofsky) (2010)
- This Is England '88 (Director: Shane Meadows) (2011)
- Intouchables – (Director: Olivier Nakache & Eric Toledano) (2011)
- Primavera – (Gary Speed RIP Documentary: Sport Wales) (2011)
- J. Edgar – (Director: Clint Eastwood) (2012)
- Derek (pilot episode) – (Director: Ricky Gervais) (2012)
- The Water Diviner – (Director: Russell Crowe) (2014)
- Mommy – (Director: Xavier Dolan) (2014)
- This Is England '90 – (Director: Shane Meadows) (2015)
- The Third Murder – (Director: Hirokazu Koreeda) (2017)
- The Father – (Director: Florian Zeller) (2020)
- Nomadland – (Director: Chloé Zhao) (2020)
- Cosmos: Possible Worlds – (TV series, director: Ann Druyan; episode: "The Sacrifice of Cassini", score by Alan Silvestri) (2020)
- The Braid – (Director: Laetitia Colombani) (2023)

=== Commercials, other ===
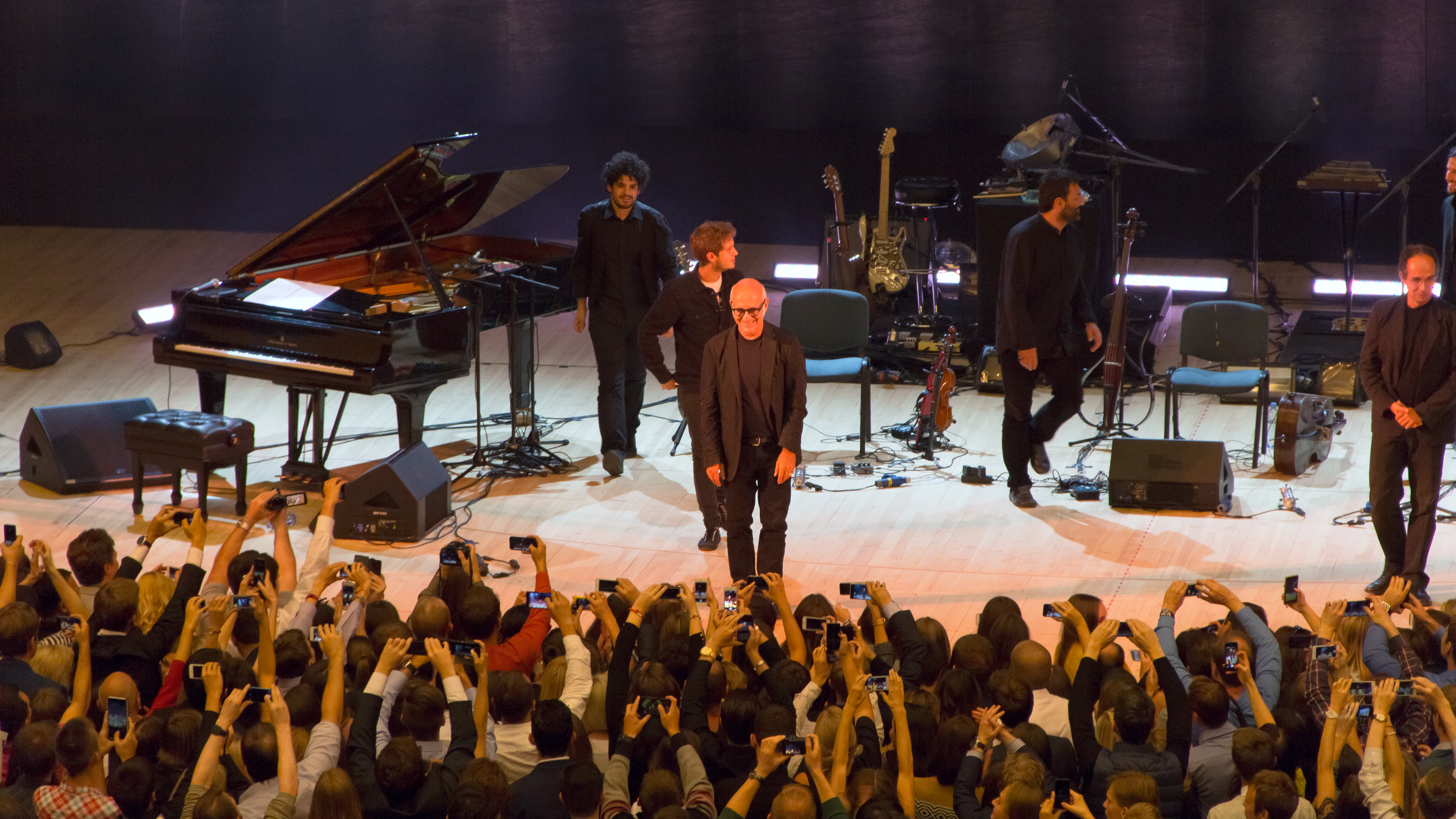
Einaudi at a concert in Moscow, 12 September 2014

- BBC – background music to minute of silence for recent racing deaths before Formula 1 Airtel Grand Prix of India (30 October). (2011)
- Airtel India TV commercial Endless Goodbye on YouTube – excerpt from "I Giorni". (2011)
- Procter & Gamble TV commercial "The Best Job" for the Olympics 2012 (excerpt from "Divenire" on YouTube). (2012)
- Numerous episodes of the BBC's Top Gear including the 2009 Bolivia Special.
- Year of creation unknown: National Basketball Association (NBA) of America, Where Will Amazing Happen This Year (Magic Johnson Sky Hook) on YouTube.
- James May's Toy Stories Christmas Special, excerpt from "Divenire". (2012)
- "The Snow Prelude N. 03 in C Major" background music to the Nationwide Building Society's adverts. (2012)
- Vodafone RED, excerpt from "Walk". (2013)
- BBC – The Apprentice – Episode 7: Caravans (Lady Labyrinth & The Crane Dance). (2013)
- British Airways Advert: Today, Tomorrow on YouTube, "Experience (Starkey Remix)" for commercial (2013)
- Één 'BIRTHDAY', Belgian documentary by photographer Lieve Blancquaert (nl.wikipedia) – 9 episodes. – "Life" as intro and outro track
- "The Book Thief" international trailer – "Life" – The Book Thief: Official Trailer #1 HD (2014), 20centuryfox on YouTube.
- "Moving Art" Louie Schwartzberg, Netflix series. (2013)
- "Valiant Hearts: The Great War" first-look trailer – "Fly" Valiant Hearts: The Great War official trailer (UK) on YouTube. (2013)
- Procter & Gamble TV commercial for the Sochi 2014 Olympics – "Primavera". (2014)
- Alan Watts spiritual guide, Choices – "Experience" Video on YouTube. (2014)
- Nike Golf ad, Rory Mcilroy tribute to Tiger Woods – "Nuvole Bianche". (2015)
- ANZ Australia: Welcome to Your World, Your Way on YouTube, "Experience" for commercial. (2015)
- UFC 193 Promo Video: UFC 193: Rousey vs. Holly Holm – Revolution on YouTube, "Experience". (2015)
- BBC: "Fly" used as the theme music to TV series Doctor Foster. (2015)
- RTVE: "Nuvole Bianche" used as the theme music of 2015 Spanish Lottery commercial. (2015)
- BBC MasterChef: The Professionals, "Life" was used when a winner was announced. (2015)
- SKY Sports, "Experience" music for commercial and other features for the 2016 Golf Open. (2016)
- Procter & Gamble TV commercial Strong on YouTube for the Rio 2016 Olympics, "Experience" music for commercial. (2016)
- Amazon Prime – A Priest and Imam meet for a cup of tea. Excerpt from "I Giorni". (2016)
- Sense8 series finale "Amor Vincit Omnia", "Experience" was played during the closing scene. (2018)

== See also ==
- List of ambient music artists
