= I Giorni =

Studio album by Ludovico Einaudi
- Released: 2001
- Recorded: October 2001 at Villa Giulini, Briosco
- Genre: Contemporary classical music
- Label: Sony Classical

Ludovico Einaudi chronology
Eden Roc (1999)	I Giorni (2001)	Diario Mali (2003)

I Giorni (2001) is a music album by the Italian pianist Ludovico Einaudi. The album's title translates as "The Days" in English. The title track, "I Giorni" has received much interest due, in part, to Greg James' airing in June 2011 of the piece on BBC Radio 1. It entered the UK Singles Chart at number 32 on 12 June 2011. The solo piano track of the same name has been featured on a BBC advert for arts and culture programmes. The same solo track has also been used in a commercial for the Indian telecom service provider Airtel, to launch its 3G services in the sub-continent in November 2010. It featured in the Amazon Prime advert "Vicar and Imam" in late 2016. The single was certified gold for 400,000 adjusted sales in United Kingdom in 2022.

== Track listing ==
No.	Title	Length
1.	"Melodia Africana I"	2:17
2.	"I Due Fiumi"	4:21
3.	"In Un'Altra Vita"	5:20
4.	"Melodia Africana II"	2:07
5.	"Stella Del Mattino"	2:13
6.	"I Giorni"	5:59
7.	"Samba"	4:14
8.	"Melodia Africana III"	4:19
9.	"La Nascita Delle Cose Segrete"	4:23
10.	"Quel Che Resta"	4:22
11.	"Inizio"	3:27
12.	"Limbo"	4:28
13.	"Bella Notte"	5:14
14.	"Canzone Africana IV"	7:32

== Charts ==
Song	Chart	Peak position
"I Giorni"	UK Singles (OCC)	32

== Certifications ==
Region	Certification	Certified units/sales
United Kingdom (BPI)	Gold	100,000^{‡}
^{‡} Sales+streaming figures based on certification alone.
