= Ben Green (comedian) =

British comedian

- Born: Canterbury, Kent, United Kingdom
- Notable work: "Punch Me I Won't Sue" – YOBI Laugh Winner

Comedy career
- Genre: Sketch comedy
- Website: www.thisisgreensville.com

Ben Rufus Green is an actor and comedian from Canterbury, Kent, England, known for playing David in The Cockfields, Shane in Dinosaur, and his own sketch comedy videos online, under the alias greensville.

Green has been writing and acting in sketches since 2006. He has also appeared in a number of television programmes including regular or recurring roles on EastEnders, Small World and Deaf Funny. He hosts a weekly live stream on his Twitch and YouTube channels called "Washing Up Club" where he chats and jokes with his audience whilst doing the washing up.

== Early life ==
Green received his Bachelor of Arts in Theatre Media Drama in 1998 with Honours from the University of Glamorgan (now the University of South Wales). He served in the British Territorial Army for one year.

== Career ==
In 2009, Green won the YOBI Laugh contest from YOBI.tv's first season for his entry "Punch Me I Won't Sue". He won $10,000 USD and tickets for two to the premiere of The Informant! starring Matt Damon as well as access to an after party and VIP tickets to the taping of the Late Show with David Letterman.

In early 2019 Green appeared in 2 episodes of EastEnders as Rory, the facilitator at a Narcotics Anonymous meeting attended by Rainie Branning (Tanya Franks) and Stuart Highway (Ricky Champ). Later that year he appeared in an episode of GameFace as a dog walker who becomes involved in an awkward exchange with Marcella (played by Roisin Conaty) on a park bench. In November of that year he also appeared as series regular David, son of Bobby Ball's character Ray and step-brother to Joe Wilkinson's character Simon, in sitcom The Cockfields.

In December 2019, Green's short Paper Trail, which he wrote and starred in, was nominated for a Writers' Guild Award in the Best Comedy Short category. It had previously been a Comedy Shorts Awards finalist in the 2019 Funny Women Awards for director Emily Brown.

== Filmography ==
Year	Title	Role	Notes
2007	Watchdog		Director: Alan Holland
2007–2008	History Hunters		Director: Seb Illis
2008	Burger King	Interviewer	Commercial. Director: Colin Gregg
2009–2011	The Grumpy Guide to...	Grumpy Man	Episodes: "Christmas", "Old School Days", "Work", "Food". Directors: Pip Banyard, Ninushka Oller
2009	Xmas Eve	Chauffeur	Short Film
2009	Virgin Trains		Commercial. Partizan
2009	Hands Solo	Dave Dennis	Short Film. UK Film Council
2010	Halifax		Commercial. Smith and Sons
2010	Sherlock	Reporter	Episode: "A Study in Pink". Director: Paul McGuigan
2011	Nuzzle and Scratch: Frock and Roll	Mr. Pettigrew	Episode: "Train Guards". Director: Jack Jameson
2012	Not Going Out	Man in Sauna	Episode: "Examination". Avalon. Director: Nick Wood
2012	Alan Carr's Summertime Specstacular 2	Open Mike	Adam Wimpenny
2013	Fool Britannia		1 episode. Director: Paul Young
2014	Live at the Electric	The Evaluator	Director: Stephen Pipe
2014	The Kiss	Ben	Short film
2015	Asylum	James Smither	Episode: "Public Relations". Director: Iain B. MacDonald
2015	Small World	Man Upstairs	2 episodes
2016	Alan Partridge's Scissored Isle	David Paul	Baby Cow. Directors: Neil Gibbons, Rob Gibbons
2016	Rich Keeble Vanity Project	DS McGowan	Episode: "The Christmas Special 2016"
2019	Paper Trail	Man	Short film. Also writer
2019	EastEnders	Rory	2 episodes. Director: Will Brenton / Laura Way
2019	GameFace	Dog Owner	1 episode
2019–21	The Cockfields	David	10 episodes. Director: Steve Bendelack / Simon Hynd
2020	Infinity Yawn	Man	Short film. Also writer
2020	NeighbourHOOD	Peter Bacq	Web series. 6 episodes. Also writer and co-director
2020	Rich Keeble Zoom Chats	Ben Rufus Green	1 episode
2022	Doctors	Marcus West	Episode: "The Maze of Monstrosities"
2022	Tea Time	Man	Short film. Also co-writer.
2024	Seize Them!	Osmund the Leather-Maker	Feature film
2024	Dinosaur	Shane	4 episodes
2024–2025	Mandy	Vicar/Waiter	2 episodes
2025	Deep Cover	Terry the Agent	Feature film
2025	Sister Boniface Mysteries	Alan Yarrow	Episode: "A Murder of Crows"
