= Michael Spicer =

Michael Spicer may refer to:

- Michael Spicer (politician) (1943–2019), British politician
- Michael Spicer (comedian) (born 1977), British comedian
