= Andrew Brooke =

English actor

Andrew Brooke is an English actor.

== Career ==
Brooke is best known for playing Ashley in the Channel 4 series PhoneShop for three series. He has appeared in movies such as Sherlock Holmes in 2009, The Bank Job and Children of Men. His many television appearances include: After Life, Da Vinci's Demons, The IT Crowd, The Inbetweeners, The Mark Steel Lectures, Doctor Who, Pulling, How Not to Live Your Life, The Bible, Law & Order: UK, My Family, Collision, EastEnders, Silent Witness and No Signal. He also produced Escape of the Artful Dodger and One Way Ticket.

Brooke portrayed Ashley in PhoneShop on Channel 4. In an interview, he revealed that, previously in his life he had sold "bread, ad space and furniture". He also said that the show had a "wide demographic".

In 2020, he played Alistair Cunningham in the BBC drama The Salisbury Poisonings.

== Filmography ==
Key
†	Denotes titles that have not yet been released

=== Film ===
Year	Title	Role	Notes
2004	D-Day 6.6.1944	Pvt. Sid Capon	TV Movie
2006	Stormbreaker	Clumsy Guard	
2006	Children of Men	Soldier	
2008	Phoo Action	Sgt. C	TV Movie
2008	The Bank Job	Quinn	
2008	He Kills Coppers	Detective	TV Movie
2009	Scouting for Rudeboys	Scout Leader's Assistant	Short
2009	Sherlock Holmes	Guard Captain	
2010	Cemetery Junction	Husband in Bar	
2012	Nice Guy	Paul	
2013	Jack the Giant Slayer	Fye	
2013	Walking with the Enemy	Captain Varga	
2014	Son of God	Antonius	
2014	Tag	Lee	Short
2016	David Brent: Life on the Road	Jerry 'Jezza' Collins	
2017	The Mummy	Mr. Brooke (Emergency Worker)	
2017	The Hunter's Prayer	Detective Robinson	
2017	Bad Drawings	Landlord	Short
2019	Angel Has Fallen	US Marshal Reyes	
2020	Natives	Paul	Short
2026	Cold Storage	Greg	

=== Television ===
Year	Title	Role	Notes
2003	EastEnders	Matt	1 episode
2003	Absolute Power	Johnny Todd	1 sequence
2004	15 Storeys High	Mark	1 episode
2004	Murder City	Labourer	1 episode
2005	According to Bex	Vox Pops	3 episodes
2005	Dream Team	Darren Dyson	1 episode
2005	Silent Witness	Terry Bannard	2 episodes
2005	Love Soup	Rufus Parry	1 episode
2006	The Best Man	Policeman	1 episode
2006	The Mark Steel Lectures	Abraham Lincoln / Charles I	2 episodes
2006	The Bill	Wayne Patterson	1 episode
2007	Ruddy Hell! It's Harry & Paul	Various characters	6 episodes
2008	The Inbetweeners	Terry	1 episode
2008	Lab Rats	Protestor	1 episode
2008	The Bill	Craig Parks	1 episode
2008	The Children	PC Warrior	3 episodes
2008	The Wrong Door	-	1 episode
2008	Beautiful People	Policeman	1 episode
2008	Coming of Age	Andy	1 episode
2009	No Signal!	Various	6 episodes
2006 - 2009	Pulling	Oleg	6 episodes
2009	Collision	P.C. Alan Clacy	4 episodes
2009	How Not to Live Your Life	Grant Bibib	1 episode
2009	Holby City	Stuart 'Spiv' Holloway	1 episode
2009	Comedy Showcase	Ashley	1 episode
2009	Big Top	Milo	1 episode
2010	Doctors	Darren Ward	1 episode
2010	The Persuasionists	Photographer	1 episode
2010	Mongrels	Farmhand	1 episode
2010	Hotel Trubble	Mr. Barker	1 episode
2011	My Family	Detective Finch	1 episode
2011	Law & Order: UK	Abraham Roach	1 episode
2012	Doctor Who	The Gunslinger	1 episode
2009-2013	PhoneShop	Ashley	19 episodes
2013	The Bible	Antonius	3 episodes
2013-2014	Da Vinci's Demons	Grunwald	9 episodes
2014	Babylon	Neil 'Banjo' Bancroft	7 episodes
2015	W1A	Dave Green	1 episode
2015	Cuffs	Michael Whylie	1 episode
2016	Ripper Street	Roy Teague	1 episode
2017	Emerald City	Dorian	2 episodes
2017	Prime Suspect: Tennison	Sgt Jim Harris	6 episodes
2018	C.B. Strike	Niall Brockbank	2 episodes
2018	Agatha Raisin	DCI Percy Hand	1 episode
2019	Absentia	Rex Wolfe	3 episodes
2019	Harlots	Mr. Wade	1 episode
2019	A Confession	Coleman	2 episodes
2019	Britannia	Maximus	1 episode
2019	Midsomer Murders	Lex Bedford	1 episode
2020	Hitmen	Nikhil	1 episode
2020	The Salisbury Poisonings	Alistair Cunningham	3 episodes
2020-2022	After Life	Ratty	3 episodes
2024	Criminal Record	Clive Silcox	2 episodes
2024	Here We Go	Greg	1 episode
2024	Sexy Beast	Torchy	1 episode
2024	Dinner with the Parents	Oscar	1 episode
2024–present	The Agency	Nick 'Grandpa'	Main role
2025	Andor	Sergeant Gharial	2 episodes
2026	Alley Cats	Fang (voice)	6 episodes
