= The Cockfields =

British television situation comedy

- Series 1 cast
- Genre: Sitcom
- Created by: David Earl; Joe Wilkinson
- Directed by: Steve Bendelack
- Starring: Joe Wilkinson; Diane Morgan; Sue Johnston; Bobby Ball; Ben Rufus Green; Gregor Fisher; Susannah Fielding
- Country of origin: United Kingdom
- Original language: English
- No. of series: 2
- No. of episodes: 10

Production
- Executive producers: Lucy Lumsden; Lucy Ansbro
- Producer: John Rushton
- Running time: 30 minutes
- Production company: Yellow Door Productions

Original release
- Network: Gold
- Release: 12 November 2019 – 13 December 2021

The Cockfields is a British television sitcom created by Joe Wilkinson and David Earl, and produced by Yellow Door Productions for Gold. It aired over two series from 12 November 2019 until 12 November 2021, followed by a Christmas special on 13 December 2021, for a total of 10 episodes. The first series was shown on BBC Two in March 2023, followed by its second in February 2025, and its Christmas special on 30 December of that year. Set on the Isle of Wight, it stars Wilkinson as Simon and Diane Morgan as his girlfriend Donna. The show begins with Simon and Donna returning to Simon's home to visit his family for his fortieth birthday. Sue Johnston plays Simon's mother Sue, Bobby Ball as his stepfather Ray and Ben Rufus Green as his stepbrother David. The cast also includes Nigel Havers as Larry (Simon's father) and Sarah Parish as Melissa (Larry's girlfriend).

Series 2 commenced with Simon again visiting the Isle of Wight, this time with new fiancée Esther (Susannah Fielding). Gregor Fisher took over the role of Ray, following the death of Bobby Ball in October 2020. A Christmas special was broadcast on 13 December 2021.

== Cast and characters ==
- Joe Wilkinson as Simon
- Diane Morgan as Donna (series 1)
- Susannah Fielding as Esther (series 2)
- Sue Johnston as Sue
- Maggie Steed Lyn (series 1)
- Michele Dotrice Lyn (series 2)
- Bobby Ball as Ray (series 1)
- Gregor Fisher as Ray (series 2)
- Ben Rufus Green as David
- Jeff Mirza as Andre (series 1)
- Nigel Havers as Larry
- Sarah Parish as Melissa
- Greg McHugh as Tony (series 2)
- June Watson as Rose
- David Earl as John (series 2)
- Daniel Crowder as Garth
- Christine Ellerbeck as Jane
- Christina Tam as Anika (series 2)

== Episodes ==
=== Series 1 (2019) ===
No. overall	No. in series	Title	Directed by	Written by	Original release date	UK viewers (millions)
1	1	"Friday"	Steve Bendelack	Joe Wilkinson & David Earl	12 November 2019	N/A
On Friday, Simon and his new girlfriend Donna arrive on the Isle of Wight to stay with Simon's overbearing family for his 40th birthday weekend celebrations.
2	2	"Saturday"	Steve Bendelack	Joe Wilkinson & David Earl	13 November 2019	N/A
On Saturday, the family visit Aunty Rose in the nursing home and have a nose at Alan Titchmarsh's house. Back home, Donna risks everything by suggesting she makes the tea to give Simon's mother Sue a break.
3	3	"Sunday"	Steve Bendelack	Joe Wilkinson & David Earl	14 November 2019	N/A
Sunday is Simon's 40th birthday. Preparations for the lunch are in full swing but the stress levels are sky high. Simon's father Larry and Larry's partner Melissa disrupt the day. Simon shares some big news with his stepfather Ray.

=== Series 2 (2021) ===
No. overall	No. in series	Title	Directed by	Written by	Original release date	UK viewers (millions)
4	1	"Wednesday"	Simon Hynd	Joe Wilkinson & David Earl	8 November 2021	N/A
Simon and Esther are engaged and it is the first day of their budget summer holiday on the Isle of Wight, staying in Sue and Ray's new house.
5	2	"Thursday"	Simon Hynd	Joe Wilkinson & David Earl	8 November 2021	N/A
Ray, Sue, Simon and Esther all go to Ventnor. Back at the house Esther has a quiet chat with David asking about his love life and she gives him a few tips.
6	3	"Friday"	Simon Hynd	Joe Wilkinson & David Earl	9 November 2021	N/A
Simon and Ray head to the nursing home to see Rose, while Sue and Esther mind Sue's stall at the Craft Fayre together.
7	4	"Saturday"	Simon Hynd	Joe Wilkinson & David Earl	10 November 2021	N/A
Simon goes on a bike ride with Larry while Esther spends the day with Sue, fielding questions about the wedding. Esther helps David get ready for his date.
8	5	"Sunday"	Simon Hynd	Joe Wilkinson & David Earl	11 November 2021	N/A
Ray teaches David and Simon how to bowl, while Sue tries to plan for Christmas. Esther's conversation with Lyn leads to a drastic decision.
9	6	"Monday"	Simon Hynd	Joe Wilkinson & David Earl	12 November 2021	N/A
Simon and Esther decide to keep their news a secret from his parents. Simon and Sue get into an argument at dinner.

=== Christmas special (2021) ===
No. overall	No. in series	Title	Directed by	Written by	Original release date	UK viewers (millions)
10	–	"Christmas Special"	Simon Hynd	Joe Wilkinson & David Earl	13 December 2021	N/A
It is 27 December and Simon and Esther pay a flying visit to Ray and Sue. They can only stay for the day as Simon is so busy with work. Sue wishes they would stay longer. A reunion at the local pub reminds Simon of what he might be missing.
