= Kate Isitt =

English actress

- Occupation: Actress
- Years active: 1993–present
- Notable work: Is it Legal? Coupling
- Partner: Nigel Cole
- Children: 2

Kate Isitt is an English actress known for her role as beauty therapist Sally Harper in the BBC television situation comedy Coupling.

From 1995 to 1998, she played Alison, a secretary in a solicitors' office, in Is It Legal? Isitt had a minor part in the film of The Saint (1997). In 1998 she played alongside Alan Davies in "Black Canary", an episode of the BBC TV mystery series Jonathan Creek and as Davies's wife in a pilot episode of the BBC comedy, A Many Splintered Thing (of which a series was made in 2000, by which time Isitt had joined the cast of Coupling). In the same year she appeared in Stephen Poliakoff's BBC TV drama, The Tribe, with, among others, Anna Friel and Joely Richardson. She also appeared as a woman whose husband became a surrogate father in Strictly Confidential in 2006. In the same year, she played alongside Demi Moore in the Craig Rosenberg directed film, Half Light. She plays Louisa in the BBC Radio 4 Sitcom Alone. The fourth series was recorded in June 2022.

Isitt trained at the Arts Educational School. She is married to Nigel Cole with whom she has two children including Matilda Cole.
