= Rovers (TV series) =

- Created by: Joe Wilkinson
- Written by: Joe Wilkinson; David Earl
- Directed by: Craig Cash
- Starring: Craig Cash; Diane Morgan; Sue Johnston; Steve Speirs
- Country of origin: United Kingdom
- Original language: English
- No. of series: 1
- No. of episodes: 6

Production
- Production location: Manchester
- Production company: Jellylegs Productions

Original release
- Network: Sky One
- Release: 24 May – 28 June 2016

Rovers is a British comedy television series that aired on Sky One. The first and only series began on 24 May 2016 and ended on 28 June 2016.

== Story ==
The series revolves around a football club in the Peak District of England and the social lives of its local members. The entire series takes place in the clubhouse, which has been run by Doreen for 25 years. The locals include Pete "Mete Pott" Mott, the club's most fanatical member, Pete's best friend Tel and his boyfriend Mel, Willy and his blind mother Francis, troublesome twosome Lee and Bruce and local woman Mandy.

== Production ==
The series was first announced on 14 December 2015. The exterior stadium shots were filmed at Church Lane, the home venue of New Mills A.F.C. in New Mills, Derbyshire.

== Music ==
While there is no opening credits sequence, each episode begins with an instrumental rendition of "You Are My Sunshine" or The White Stripes' "Seven Nation Army".

== Cast ==
- Sue Johnston as Doreen, owner of the club and chief barmaid.
- Lolly Adefope as Sam, new barmaid of the club.
- Craig Cash as Pete Mott, the team's biggest fan. He must deal with club's poor performances and the feeling he's losing Tel.
- Steve Speirs as Terrence "Tel", Pete's best friend. He has recently come out of the closet and spends more and more time with his boyfriend Melvin.
- Jamie Demetriou as Tom, local man. Tom was in foster care and was then homeless until Pete took him in.
- Seb Cardinal as Melvin "Mel", the mildly flamboyant boyfriend of Tel.
- Joe Wilkinson as Lee, local man. He enjoys ragging on Pete and his Rovers cohort.
- David Earl as Bruce, brother of Lee. They are two of a set of triplets, although the third sibling is never seen.
- Diane Morgan as Mandy, local woman known for her unpredictable proclivities. Morgan would go on to have her own series based around this character.
- Pearce Quigley as Willy, local man. Son of Francis, he lives with and looks after his blind mother.
- Judith Barker as Francis, local woman. She is blind and relies on the attention and care of her son Willy, often inconveniencing his social life.
- Mark Silcox as Ronnie, general factotum at the club.

== Episodes ==
Series	Episodes	Originally aired	
Series	Episodes	Series premiere	Series finale
1	6	24 May 2016	28 June 2016

=== Series 1 (2016) ===
No. overall	No. in season	Title	Directed by	Written by	Original release date	U.K. viewers (millions)
1	1	"The Meat Raffle"	Craig Cash	Joe Wilkinson and David Earl	24 May 2016	N/A
Doreen shows the new barmaid, Sam, the ropes while gossiping about the club captain, Mike Nolan. Meanwhile, Pete gets locked in the club’s toilet cubicle.
2	2	"The Biscuit Plate"	Craig Cash	Joe Wilkinson and David Earl	31 May 2016	N/A
Pete is fuming about the Rovers’ keeper Dave Head losing them the game. Doreen is excited about a trip up the Shard.
3	3	"The Tankard"	Craig Cash	Joe Wilkinson and David Earl	7 June 2016	N/A
Pete attempts to break the world record for eating fish fingers. Doreen gets a little flustered when Redbridge Rovers legend Roger Small makes an appearance.
4	4	"England V Macedonia"	Craig Cash	Joe Wilkinson and David Earl	14 June 2016	N/A
It’s exciting times at the club as the gang watch England draw nilnil with Macedonia. Doreen’s friend Gillian loses her blue cat and Tom writes a poem.
5	5	"Bonzo The Redbridge Rover"	Craig Cash	Joe Wilkinson and David Earl	21 June 2016	N/A
Pete’s son Stanley experiences his first ever game and there’s a surprise in store for him. Mel cooks Tel a summer roast and Doreen has a twitchy eye.
6	6	"The Anniversary"	Craig Cash	Joe Wilkinson and David Earl	28 June 2016	N/A
It’s Doreen’s 25th anniversary at the club, but no one seems that bothered. Pete reveals to Tel that he is worried he is losing him to Mel.
