= David Earl (actor) =

British actor and comedian

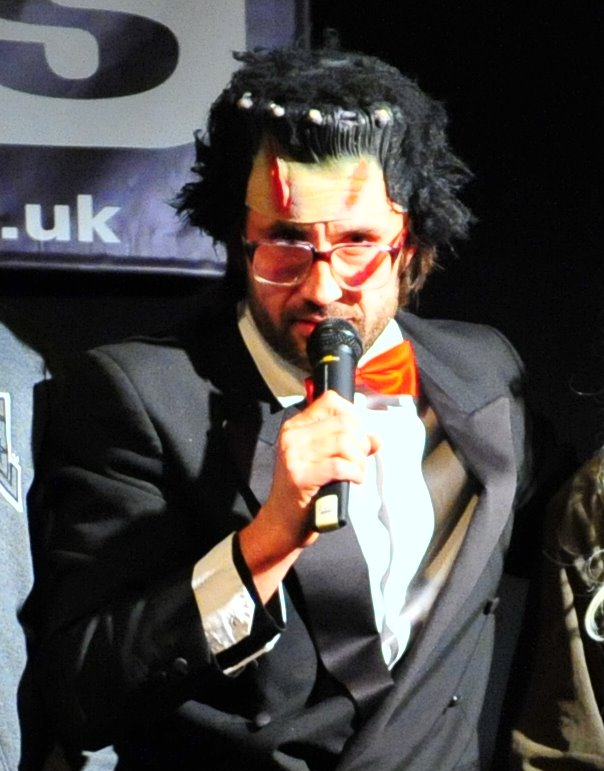
- Earl in 2008
- Born: David Geoffrey Earl

Comedy career
- Years active: 2006–present
- Medium: Stand-up comedy, actor, writer
- Genres: Cringe comedy, Dark comedy, Surreal humour

David Geoffrey Earl is a British actor and comedian, known for his comedy character Brian Gittins. He has featured in several projects associated with Ricky Gervais, most notably as Kevin "Kev" Twine in the comedy-drama Derek, and in smaller roles in Extras, After Life and the film Cemetery Junction. Gervais considers Earl to be funniest person he knows. Earl also works frequently with comic Joe Wilkinson. Together they co-wrote and starred in the sitcom Rovers, and the comedy series The Cockfields. He also co-wrote and starred in the feature film Brian and Charles where he plays an isolated inventor who builds a robot. He is famous for his mid life crisis humour and constant threats of moving house and a new life.

== Early life ==
Earl was born in Crawley, West Sussex. Before undertaking acting roles, Earl worked as a gardener.

== Comedy career ==
One of Earl's earliest online videos featured him playing a character called Graham, which he sent to a friend who showed it to Ricky Gervais and Stephen Merchant. They liked the video and Gervais asked Earl to play an obsessive fan, based on the character from the video, who talks to Andy Millman in a pub in an episode of Extras. Around this time Earl played Tony Queen in the film The Penalty King.

Earl went on to create a number of online videos in character as Brian Gittins and played this role in the film Cemetery Junction. In 2012 a sitcom pilot entitled Gittins was broadcast on Channel 4. In the pilot Gittins works as a taxi driver: previously the character had been a cafe owner and this discrepancy is highlighted in an episode of the podcast Flatshare Slamdown, in which Earl appears as Brian. He releases regular Brian Gittins and Friends podcasts.

Another of Earl's characters is Steve "Cumbo" Cumberland, who features in a number of online videos, including a Channel 4 Comedy Blaps series, co-written with Brett Goldstein.

In 2011, Earl was revealed to be the person behind the popular Twitter account of Peter Thraft, a supposed sex therapist.

== Personal life ==
Earl has three children and lives in Devon with his wife Naomi.

== Filmography ==
Year	Title	Role	Episodes	Notes
2006	Extras	Obsessive fan	1 episode	
2006	The Penalty King	Tony Queen	Film	
2007	The Inspector Lynley Mysteries	George	1 episode	
2010	Cemetery Junction	Brian	Film	
2011	Job Culture	Doorman	Film	
2012	4Funnies	Brian Gittins	1 episode	Writer
2012	Cumbo	Steve Gene Cumberland	3 episodes	
2012–2014	Derek	Kevin "Kev" Twine	14 episodes	
2016	Rovers	Bruce	6 episodes	Writer and associate producer
2017	Drunk History		1 episode	
2017	Brian and Charles	Brian Gittins	Short	Writer
2019–2022	After Life	Brian Gittins	15 episodes	
2018	Sick Note	Paul	1 episode	
2019	The Cockfields	John	3 episodes	Writer and Associate producer
2022	Brian and Charles	Brian Gittins	Film	Writer
2023	Apocalypse Clown	Bobo	Film	
2026	Alley Cats	Puke	6 episodes	Voice
2026	Joe & David's Magical Sitcom Tour	Himself	3 episodes	

== Podcasts ==
=== The Brian Gittins Show ===
A live radio show hosted on Spreaker from 2012-2017, where Brian played the role of 'the worst radio presenter in the world'. Callers would Skype in from around the world, and these included David Edwards and Charles Petrescu.

=== Brian Gittins and Friends ===
Brian, David Edwards and Charles Petrescu have a chat with various comedians. It started in 2016, with guests including John Kearns, Lolly Adefope, and Scroobius Pip.

=== Gossipmongers ===
In 2019, David Earl, Joe Wilkinson and Poppy Hillstead began a podcast called Gossipmongers, a weekly podcast to which listeners send in unsubstantiated rumours. At the end of each episode they choose their favourite piece of gossip from that episode. In September 2020, without any public explanation from Earl or Wilkinson, Hillstead was removed from the podcast.
