= Pearce Quigley =

British actor

- Born: Pierce J. Quigley; 16 May 1965 (age 61); Salford, Lancashire, England
- Occupation: Actor

Pearce Quigley (born 16 May 1965) is an English actor. His credits include the TV series Pie in the Sky, Happiness (2001–2003), Cutting It (2002–2005), Rovers (2016), Detectorists (2014–2022), The Gentlemen (2024-2026, as John "The Gospel" Dixon), and Small Prophets (2026). He has also had roles in films, including Millions (2004), and The Way Back (2010), and Peterloo (2018). He plays Will in the BBC Radio 4 sitcom Alone, and has had extensive experience on stage.

== Career ==
=== Theatre ===
Quigley has appeared in The Seagull (Royal Court); Paul (National Theatre); Journey's End (Comedy Theatre); My Night with Reg and Dealer's Choice (Birmingham Rep); Feelgood (Hampstead and Garrick); Blue Heart (Royal Court); Shopping and Fucking (Out of Joint at Gielgud, International Tour and Queen's Theatre); The Queen and I – The Royals Down Under (Out of Joint Australian tour); Rat in the Skull (Royal Court and Duke of York's); The Queen and I (Out of Joint at the Royal Court and Vaudeville Theatre); Road (Out of Joint at the Royal Court); Der Neue Menoza (Gate Theatre); Rope (Birmingham Rep); A Jovial Crew (RSC); The Winter's Tale (RSC); The Merry Wives of Windsor (RSC); The Changeling (RSC); Abingdon Square (Shared Experience); Doctor Faustus (Globe); A Midsummer Night's Dream (Globe); The Taming of the Shrew (Globe); and Twelfth Night (Globe, 2025).

=== Screen ===
Quigley appeared in Pie in the Sky, the comedy series Happiness (2001–2003), the drama series Cutting It (2002–2005), Millions (2004), 15 Storeys High (2004), Born Equal (2006), Within the Whirlwind (2009), and The Way Back (2010), alongside Ed Harris, Saoirse Ronan, and Colin Farrell. He was in Breaking the Bank (2014), Rovers (2016), and Peterloo (2018), alongside Rory Kinnear. From 2014 to 2022, Quigley played the part of Russell in the television sitcom Detectorists. In December 2021, Quigley played the Ghost of Christmas Present in the BBC TV special We Wish You A Mandy Christmas.

In 2023, he had a small part in The Full Monty and he played Albie in Episode 3 of The Reckoning. He played a disgruntled cyclist in one episode of Peter Kay's Car Share.

In 2026 Quigley played the lead role in Small Prophets. Writer and director Mackenzie Crook said:

I think he's one of the funniest men I've ever met. He's a unique actor in a way that I can't quite put my finger on. His delivery is so deadpan dry ... I've only ever seen him in smaller roles, sidekick roles, and I wanted to see him front and centre in something.

=== Radio ===
Quigley has been a regular in the BBC Radio 4 sitcoms Plum House and Alone.

== Filmography ==
=== Film ===
Year	Title	Role	Notes
1989	Ladder of Swords	Constable Lowe	
1989	Killing Dad (Or How To Love Your Mother)	Luggage attendant	
2000	The House of Mirth	Percy Gryce	
2004	Millions	Community policeman	
2005	Big Dippers	Perry	
2005	Riot at the Rite	Nicholas Roerich	
2006	Born Equal	Beggar 1	
2007	Grow Your Own	Eddie	
2008	Britain's Got the Pop Factor... and Possibly a New Celebrity Jesus Christ Soapstar Superstar Strictly on Ice	Dog Trainer	Two-part television movie
2009	Stalin: Reign of Terror	Yelvov	
2010	You Will Meet a Tall Dark Stranger	Poker friend	
2010	The Way Back	Channeler	
2011	Frankenstein's Wedding... Live in Leeds	Fred	
2012	Doctor Faustus	Robin, Alexander	
2013	The Taming of the Shrew at Shakespeare's Globe	Grumio	
2014	Shakespeare's Globe: A Midsummer Night's Dream	Bottom	
2014	Breaking the Bank	Oscar	
2015	The Process	Martin	
2015	National Theatre Live: The Beaux' Stratagem	Scrub	
2018	Peterloo	Joshua	
2018	Shakespeare's Globe: Hamlet	Rosencrantz	
2019	The Merry Wives of Windsor: Live from Shakespeare's Globe	Sir John Falstaff	
2020	Talk Radio	Barry	
2021	Cuckoo	Father	Short film
2023	The Critic	Mr. Morrisey	
2024	Peaked	Steven	
2025	Bank of Dave 2	David H	

=== Television ===
Year	Title	Role	Notes
1990	Inspector Morse	Mick McGovern	One episode
1991	A Perfect Hero	Douthwaite	One episode
1992	Growing Rich	Woodie	Six episodes
1993	Prime Suspect	Red	Two episodes
1996	Pie in the Sky	Alistair, Lord Pilbury	One episode
1996	Our Friends in the North	Detective	One episode
1997	The Bill	Brian Wilby	One episode
1997	New Voices	Brian	One episode
1997	Heartbeat	Red Broadbent	One episode
1999	Wing and a Prayer	Trevor Pike	One episode
1999	Hippies	Policeman Eric	One episode
2000	That Peter Kay Thing	Ron Hibbert	One episode
2000	Queer as Folk	Graham Beck	Two episodes
2000	Pay and Display	Adolf	One episode
2001–2003	Happiness	Sid	Twelve episodes
2002–2005	Cutting It	Eugene Eubank	Twenty-five episodes
2004	15 Storeys High	Jonathan	One episode
2004	New Tricks	Frank Fox	One episode
2005	The Virgin Queen	Henry Bedingfeld	One episode
2007	Lead Balloon	Alan	One episode
2009	The Thick of It	Doug Hayes	One episode
2010	Being Human	Catholic Priest	One episode
2013	Midsomer Murders	Colin Yule	One episode
2013	Being Eileen	Dave	One episode
2014–2022	Detectorists	Russell	Nineteen episodes
2015	Together	Mark Tetherford	One episode
2016	Rovers	Willy	Six episodes
2016–2018	Home from Home	Ben Thistlewaite	Six episodes
2017	Peter Kay's Car Share	Cyclist	One episode
2017	Three Girls	Peter Boyd	One episode
2017	In the Dark	Trevor Hare	Three episodes
2018	Lovesick	Simon	Three episodes
2019	Down from London	Alan	One episode
2020	COBRA	Nick Dunbar	Two episodes
2020	Housebound	Al Allison	Eight epidodes
2021	The Wheel of Time	Master Hightower	One episode
2021–2025	Mandy	Ghost of Christmas Past (2021), Lee (2025)	Two episodes
2022	McDonald & Dodds	Hector Ingham	One episode
2023	The Full Monty	Alan	One episode
2023	The Reckoning	Albie	Two episodes
2024	Death in Paradise	Ivan McQuillan	One episode
2024	The Gentlemen	Gospel John	Four episodes
2024	Showtrial	Phillip Holmes KC	Four episodes
2025	Art Detectives	Charlie Filton	One episode
2026	Small Prophets	Michael Sleep	Six episodes
2027	The Cadburys	John	
