= PhoneShop =

British television comedy series

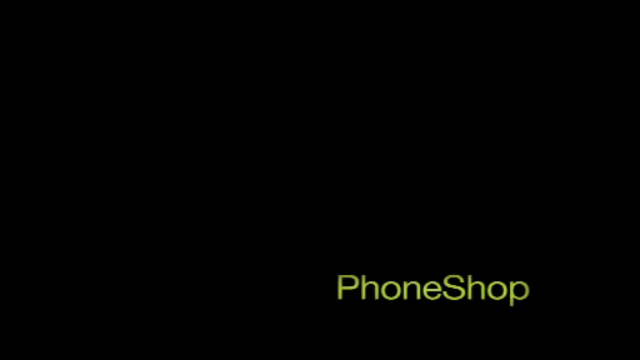
- Genre: British sitcom
- Created by: Phil Bowker
- Written by: Phil Bowker and The Cast
- Directed by: Phil Bowker
- Starring: Tom Bennett; Andrew Brooke; Emma Fryer; Javone Prince; Martin Trenaman
- Country of origin: United Kingdom
- Original language: English
- No. of series: 3
- No. of episodes: 19 (list of episodes)

Production
- Producer: Phil Bowker
- Production location: Sutton High Street
- Editor: Jon Blow
- Running time: 30 minutes (inc. adverts)
- Production companies: Talkback Thames (2010–11); Retort (2013)

Original release
- Network: E4
- Release: 13 November 2009 – 29 August 2013

PhoneShop is a British sitcom that was first broadcast on Channel 4 as a television pilot on 13 November 2009, as part of the channel's Comedy Showcase season of comedy pilots. It was then followed by a six-episode series that was commissioned on E4 and broadcasting began on 7 October 2010.

== Development ==
PhoneShop is created, written, produced and directed by Phil Bowker, who is also a comedy editor at the production company behind the show, Talkback Thames. In the opening credits the cast are collectively credited with bringing in additional material. The programme had been commissioned a full series on digital channel E4 before the pilot was broadcast.

== Premise ==
PhoneShop is set in a mobile phone shop in Sutton, London and follows a graduate named Christopher (played by Tom Bennett) who goes through a one-day trial and subsequent employment. His fellow employees are Jerwayne (played by Javone Prince), Ashley (played by Andrew Brooke), Janine (played by Emma Fryer) and store manager Lance (played by Martin Trenaman).

== Cast ==
=== Main ===
- Tom Bennett as Christopher "Newman": a graduate fresh out of university hired by Lance to replace the incarcerated "Little" Gary Patel
- Andrew Brooke as Ashley: a salesman who has known Jerwayne since secondary school and work together in their girlfriend pursuits
- Emma Fryer as Janine: the sole dedicated employee, in charge of "pay-as-you-go"
- Javone Prince as Jerwayne Sinclair: Ashley's best friend and a salesman who pursues relationships with customers by lying about himself
- Martin Trenaman as Lance: the incompetent manager of the Sutton branch of PhoneShop, who seeks shelter away from his demanding wife Shelley

=== Recurring ===
- Kayvan Novak as Razz Prince (series 1–2), Lance's unhinged boss and the main antagonist of the first two series
- Juliet Cowan (series 1–2) and Susannah Wise (series 3) as Shelley, Lance's psychotic wife

== Characters ==
=== Christopher ===
Christopher (portrayed by Tom Bennett) is a university graduate who joins the PhoneShop team at the start of the series on a one day trial as the replacement for "Little" Gary Patel. Christopher is a gentle natured and naïve young man and a "fish out of water" in the cynical environment of mobile phone retail. Initially scorned and treated as the butt of various jokes and mockery by Jerwayne and Ashley, he gradually settles into his role and integrates into the team successfully. He wins his colleagues' respect by defeating an arrogant Croydon branch rival in a quiz about the company, followed by an impassioned speech on the theme of corporate ethics, only to immediately contradict his own high minded principles by being exposed as having lied to an elderly customer about being a trainee human rights lawyer to secure the sale when she returns to the shop at the most inopportune moment to return his elite salesman timepiece he had used to gain her trust which she had inadvertently left with earlier. Christopher comes to look up to his more streetwise colleagues and becomes keen to be treated as their equal, despite being unable to shake off the disparaging nickname "New-man." He demonstrates his loyalty when Razz Prince, in an attempt to force the incompetent Lance out, tries to groom Christopher as a spy and feed Razz negative information about the hapless manager. Christopher saves Lance's job by leading Razz to believe he is cooperating with the plan, only to rebut him at the final moment. Christopher forms a close friendship with Janine, although she sometimes uses him to her own advantage, such as when she persuades him to play the role of a psychopathic hard man in order to impress an ex-boyfriend. In Season 3, Episode 4, it is revealed that Christopher has been lying to his parents that he has in fact been promoted to Store Manager, a deceit that the others reluctantly go along with to spare Christopher embarrassment.

=== Jerwayne ===
Jerwayne (portrayed by Javone Prince) is a Sales Executive at PhoneShop Sutton branch. Jerwayne believes himself to be a highly successful salesman and irresistible ladies' man, and often boasts of his supposed success with women. In reality, he is a low level employee who despite being a grown adult, still lives with his mother. He drives an Audi TT with numerous mechanical faults, and it is revealed that he paid "£3,000 for a £30,000 car." Jerwayne is Ashley's best friend as well as close co-worker, and the pair frequently egg each other on in foolish or unrealistic schemes and escapades. Jerwayne has an ongoing romantic interest in Janine, which is highlighted when Janine falls for a seemingly suave and successful Scotsman, provoking a jealous reaction from Jerwayne who vows to disrupt the relationship (which he eventually does with Ashley's help). Jerwayne speaks in a loud, Jamaican English dialect, is of British Caribbean extraction and uses a great deal of profanity and street slang in his speech. It is suggested that Jerwayne does have some ability as a salesman; Razz Prince invites him to interview for the mythical "Elite Selling Crew," an offer Jerwayne rejects because it would mean competing for the position against his best friend Ashley.

=== Ashley ===
Ashley (portrayed by Andrew Brooke) is a Sales Executive at PhoneShop Sutton branch. Ashley is the slightly more mature one of the Jerwayne / Ashley duo, but shares his colleague's vanity and inflated ego. Ashley is shown to be relatively successful with women, at least in terms of getting dates. He believes that expressing an appreciation of the work of the actor Jude Law is a failsafe method of seduction. However, the dates he does go on inevitably end badly; on one occasion he dates an aggressively deranged female soldier who quickly terrifies him into running away. On another, a seemingly beautiful and refined air hostess dampens his ardour through her loutish behaviour during their date. Ashley is extremely sensitive about his growing bald patch and expresses fears that he is becoming unattractive to younger women because of it. Like Jerwayne, Ashley often speaks in a Jamaican English accent, incongruous to his White British heritage and littered with frequent profanity. Ashley is shown in glimpses to be skilled with and appreciative of language; he describes poems he has accidentally received from male British Army soldiers stationed in Afghanistan as "elegantly structured" and often uses thoughtful and advanced vocabulary, albeit punctuated with slang and swear words. It is suggested that Ashley does have some ability as a salesman; Razz Prince invites him to interview for the mythical "Elite Selling Crew," an offer Ashley rejects because it would mean competing for the position against his best friend Jerwayne.

=== Janine ===
Janine (portrayed by Emma Fryer) is a Sales Executive at PhoneShop Sutton branch. Janine is the lowliest member of staff at the shop, running the much derided "Pay As You Go" section. She considers herself to be underappreciated and her talents undervalued, yearning for more responsibility and higher status within the team, but when she is briefly given some authority, she is largely ignored. She has occasional flashes of almost psychotic rage before quickly recovering her composure. Janine has a colourful history with men; she persuades Christopher to pretend to be her thuggish, criminal boyfriend in order to make an ex-partner jealous. She falls in love with an apparently sophisticated and educated Scotsman, much to the chagrin of Jerwayne, but ends the relationship when it emerges that he is a feminine waste disposal technician, who plans to marry Janine and add her photograph to his van. She claims to have once been a hand model doubling for Princess Diana. Janine quickly forms a bond with Christopher, the other low status PhoneShop employee and continues to involve him in her schemes to gain the attention of Lance and win the promotion she so badly covets, but the recognition she seeks never comes. Frustrated, she almost leaves the team to partner up with Shelley, but this brief friendship falls apart when Shelley hires a troupe of male escorts who, to Janine's disgust, turn out to be two sexually repulsive regulars from the local pub (see under Shelley, below). Janine is fashion conscious and often dresses in distinctive outfits. She speaks in a soft voice with a slight South London accent. Janine does have some surprising talents - being fluent in Cantonese, revealed to her regional manager PA's astonishment.

=== Lance ===
Lance (portrayed by Martin Trenaman) is the bungling Store Manager of PhoneShop Sutton branch. Lance is a middle aged, overweight man who lives in constant fear of his unstable wife Shelley. It is explained in a humiliating address by the contemptuous manager of the Croydon branch that Lance was once a promising young company executive with the potential to be a great success, but that in the late 1980s made the foolish decision to invest heavily in phonecards rather than the emerging mobile technology that would go on to change the face of the communications business. As a result, Lance got stuck in a management role he was ill-suited for, and ever since has been viewed as an inept buffoon by his superiors and staff alike as well as his wife. Lance has little authority over his staff who often ignore his instructions, although he is treated with some measure of affection by them, and Christopher risks his own job to save Lance's from the scheming Razz Prince. Lance lives in almost religious awe of his former, now incarcerated employee "Little" Gary Patel, to the point he has a huge mural of Gary painted on his office wall with the legend "What would Little Gary do?" and a candle-lit shrine exhibiting one of Gary's blood stained ties as reverential and motivational prompts. Oddly, this shrine is somewhat revered by the other members of staff also. Lance enjoys reggae and dancehall music and joins a special club, the "WMRC" (White Men's Reggae Club) where he and fellow Caucasian enthusiasts can dance to the traditionally Jamaican music "without fear of ridicule." Lance is accidentally revealed to be extremely sexually well endowed and as a result is pressured into joining Jerwayne and Ashley's fledgling male escort business; something he is distinctly hesitant about doing. He has a complicated relationship with Shelley, of whom he is frightened to the point of hiding in a restaurant kitchen locker to avoid. In Series 1, it is revealed that due to Lance's incompetence, he and Shelley never legally got married as they had both believed to have been the case. Lance arranges for them to rectify this, but in typical style, mismanages the ceremony which ends in a brawl. He does, however, appear to genuinely love her and the pair are at one point depicted tenderly embracing in bed.

=== Razz Prince ===
Razz Prince (portrayed by Kayvan Novak; series 1–2) is the unhinged Regional Manager for the PhoneShop company, Lance's line manager, and the main antagonist of the first two series. Razz is a loud, hyperactive and violent tempered man whose signature greeting is to burst into a room miming two handguns and screaming "FREEZE MOTHERFUCKERS!!!!" to the unpleasant surprise of everyone there. He is prone to excessive mood swings, often in the space of a few seconds veering from calm and conversational to violently aggressive. Razz has an obsession with Mixed Martial Arts and rarely misses an opportunity to demonstrate his supposed talents in this field, although it is later revealed he has very little idea of how to fight using martial arts at all. Razz likes to project an image himself of a high flying jet setter, living a lifestyle of expensive suits, exclusive nightclubs, champagne, wealth and influence, which is not matched by his relatively mundane Regional Manager job. He often begins to sing or rap in the middle of conversations, accompanied by bizarre physical gestures and often uses elaborate visual metaphors (such as having his secretly contemptuous personal assistant mime a dove being blown apart by an imaginary bullet when berating Lance) and unusual vocal pitch and tone to emphasise his points. As a result of his unpredictability, he is mostly treated with wariness and deference by the team, who are all too aware of the ease with which his volcanic temper can be provoked. Whilst treating Lance with utter scorn, and barely acknowledging Janine, he appears to have some appreciation of Jerwayne and Ashley's abilities as salesmen, inviting them to join the "legendary" "Elite Selling Crew," only for both men to decline the offer when they discover Razz had plotted to have them physically fight each other for the job, and walking out on the writhing Razz who has been shot in the testicles with a paintball gun. Later, tiring of Lance's poor performance, but aware that redundancy would be too expensive, Razz attempts to bribe and flatter Christopher into gathering compromising information about Lance so he can be sacked; Christopher eventually refuses to do so, earning Razz's permanent enmity as a result.

=== Shelley ===
Shelley (portrayed by Juliet Cowan; series 1–2; and by Susannah Wise; series 3) is Lance's psychotic, borderline alcoholic wife. Shelley is a foul mouthed, erratic woman who strikes fear into the team whenever she appears. Shelley considers Lance to be a weak, bumbling idiot, at one point describing him as "a bloated bin-bag of broken dreams, floating on a sea of shit". She does, however, rely on his income, having no apparent job herself. Permanently bad tempered and often drunk, Shelley is also sexually voracious and has propositioned both Ashley and Jerwayne, even invading the latter's bedroom and causing him to run into the street in fear. She has a low opinion of Lance's staff, referring to Ashley as a "Shithouse" and Christopher as a "Creepy little cunt." For a time, she becomes close friends with Janine and takes her on a whirlwind tour of alcohol fueled late nights in Sutton, but the friendship ends when Shelley demands Janine prove her loyalty by joining her in a sex session with a group of male escorts which turn out to be two regulars from the local pub – Les and "Wheelchair" Dave – dressed in navy dress uniform ("ones"), causing Janine to almost vomit at the prospect. For all of her negative traits, Shelley does, deep down, love Lance; the pair are at one point depicted tenderly embracing in bed.

=== "Little" Gary Patel ===
"Little" Gary Patel (portrayed by Keeza Farhan; series 1) is a former Sales Executive at PhoneShop Sutton branch. The series begins shortly after Gary has been arrested and remanded in custody for unspecified criminal offences described as "the Catford hat-trick"; his replacement is Christopher. Although only very briefly appearing in person in a short CCTV clip and speaking to Lance down the telephone, Gary's presence looms over the PhoneShop team. Lance idolises his former staff member to the point of almost seeing him as a messianic figure; prior to his imprisonment, Gary was Sutton branch's perpetual 'Employee of the Month,' revered for his extraordinary ability to sell mobile phone contracts to the public no matter how ridiculously poor value or inflexible, nor how violently and abusively he treated customers.

== Series overview ==
Series	Episodes	Originally released	
Series	Episodes	First released	Last released
1	6	7 October 2010	4 November 2010
2	6	10 November 2011	15 December 2011
3	6	25 July 2013	29 August 2013

== Episode list ==
=== Pilot ===
Christopher, a recent graduate, is set to replace the Phone Shop's previous legendary sales assistant. But will he pass his one day trial?

=== Series 1 (2010) ===
No. overall	No. in series	Title	Directed by	Written by	Original release date
1	1	"Doctor Who"	Phil Bowker	Phil Bowker, The Cast & Jon MacQueen	7 October 2010
Christopher has his first full day at work, still under the name of 'Newman'. Jerwayne and Ashley teach him the tricks of the trade. Janine attempts to impress Lance in the hope he will choose her as his new assistant manager due to the departure of Little Gary Patel. Rivals from the Croydon branch come in to complain at Sutton's workers. Adam Deacon stars as the store manager from Croydon.
2	2	"Never On A Tuesday"	Phil Bowker	Phil Bowker, The Cast & Jon MacQueen	14 October 2010
Christopher goes on a date with a girl from the High Street, having taken advice from Jerwayne and Ashley, and does not go as planned.
3	3	"The First Temptation of Chris"	Phil Bowker	Phil Bowker, The Cast & Jon MacQueen	21 October 2010
4	4	"Bear Bad Man"	Phil Bowker	Phil Bowker, The Cast & Jon MacQueen	28 October 2010
5	5	"Salesman of the Month"	Phil Bowker	Phil Bowker, The Cast & Jon MacQueen	4 November 2010
6	6	"Soldier, Swinger, Shelley, Shelley"	Phil Bowker	Phil Bowker, The Cast & Jon MacQueen	4 November 2010

=== Series 2 (2011) ===
No. overall	No. in series	Title	Directed by	Written by	Original release date
7	1	"Lance Got Game"	Phil Bowker	Phil Bowker & The Cast	10 November 2011
8	2	"It’s Training Men"	Phil Bowker	Phil Bowker & The Cast	17 November 2011
9	3	"The Sleepyman"	Phil Bowker	Phil Bowker & The Cast	24 November 2011
10	4	"Whatheather"	Phil Bowker	Phil Bowker & The Cast	1 December 2011
11	5	"Come Dine with We"	Phil Bowker	Phil Bowker & The Cast	8 December 2011
12	6	"Revenge of the Razz"	Phil Bowker	Phil Bowker & The Cast	15 December 2011

=== Series 3 (2013) ===
No. overall	No. in series	Title	Directed by	Written by	Original release date
13	1	"Baking Bad"	Phil Bowker	Phil Bowker & The Cast	25 July 2013
14	2	"Nick Nack PaddyWhack"	Phil Bowker	Phil Bowker & The Cast	1 August 2013
15	3	"Pay As You Grow"	Phil Bowker	Phil Bowker & The Cast	8 August 2013
16	4	"#Goodtimes"	Phil Bowker	Phil Bowker & The Cast	15 August 2013
17	5	"Hair Today"	Phil Bowker	Phil Bowker & The Cast	22 August 2013
18	6	"Do The Music"	Phil Bowker	Phil Bowker & The Cast	29 August 2013
