= Joe Wilkinson =

English comedian (born 1975)

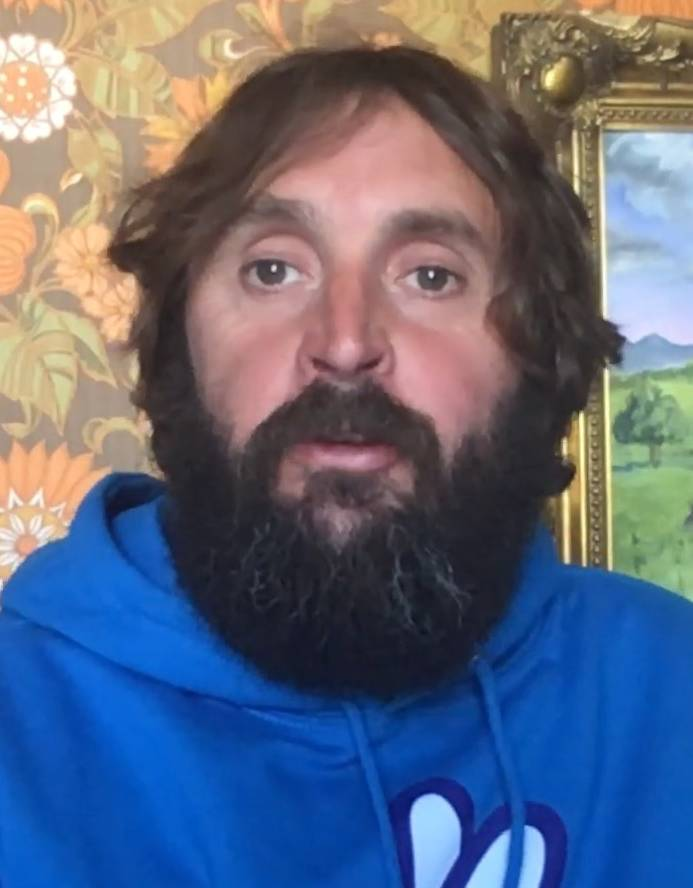
- Wilkinson in 2020
- Born: Joseph Roland Wilkinson; 2 May 1975 (age 51); Bromley, London, England
- Occupations: Actor; comedian; screenwriter
- Years active: 2004–present
- Spouse: Petra Exton (m. 2015)

Comedy career
- Medium: Film; stand-up; television
- Genres: Black comedy; cringe comedy; surreal humour

Joseph Roland Wilkinson (born 2 May 1975) is an English comedian, actor, and screenwriter. He began his comedy career in 2004 and has supported Alan Carr and Russell Howard on tour. In 2006, Wilkinson won the Hackney Empire New Act of the Year.

Wilkinson's television appearances include Live at the Electric and 8 Out of 10 Cats Does Countdown. He is also in the comedy duo Two Episodes of Mash, alongside Diane Morgan. In 2019 Wilkinson won a celebrity special version of The Great British Bake Off (for Stand Up to Cancer UK).

== Early life ==
Wilkinson was born in Bromley to Stella and Brian Wilkinson. He was named after his grandfather, Rolan Joseph. Along with his brother, Robert, Wilkinson was brought up in the village of Kemsing in Kent. He attended Tunbridge Wells Grammar School for Boys.

== Career ==
While working in graphic design, Wilkinson started his career in 2004 at his local pub, which was holding an 'open mic' evening. Asked by the pub to return, Wilkinson told the Northern Echo:

I thought, 'Oh, I hadn't really thought about doing it again'. So I did that a few months later, and then someone else booked me and it just sort of kept going. People kept booking me and I have no recollection of my first gig. I'm almost certain it wasn't brilliant. I'd love to say I had my five-point plan. I'm still sort of winging it if I'm honest.

Since 2008, he has performed many stand-up shows, including the tour "Joe Wilkinson: My Mum's Called Stella and My Dad's Called Brian", and has appeared at venues such as the Edinburgh Fringe and the Bloomsbury Theatre.

=== Television ===
Since 2010, Wilkinson has appeared in a number of television shows. In 2010, he played various characters in the first series of Robert's Web. He appeared on The Rob Brydon Show, The Wright Stuff, Show & Tell, Comedy Lab, My Funniest Year, and the television film England's Worst Ever Football Team. He played a major role in Him & Her as Dan Perkins, the lonely, socially awkward neighbour to main characters Becky and Steve.

Wilkinson has appeared on 8 Out of 10 Cats, Have I Got News for You, Mock the Week and Never Mind the Buzzcocks and has performed at a stand-up section of Russell Howard's Good News. He has appeared in Miranda.

Wilkinson wrote three episodes in the first series of Anna & Katy, as well as an animated short in 2012, A Fishy Tale. Three episodes of Show & Tell and the episode '2001' for My Funniest Year were written by him.

Wilkinson was involved in the BBC Three comedy show Live at the Electric as a member of the comedic double act Two Episodes of Mash with Diane Morgan. It had been previously broadcast on BBC Radio 2.

In 2014, Wilkinson appeared as a resident comedian on the revived TV game show Celebrity Squares, hosted by Warwick Davis on ITV. It returned for a second series in April 2015.

In 2016, he starred in the Sky 1 series Rovers which he co-wrote with David Earl. He was also a contestant on the second series of Dave comedy panel show Taskmaster.

In 2019, Wilkinson appeared as Jeffrey in the first and third series of the Netflix original series Sex Education, and featured in Ricky Gervais' comedy-drama After Life as "Postman Pat", the incompetent and nosey postman of the main character's street.

In November 2019 he starred in the three-part Gold sitcom The Cockfields, which he co-wrote with David Earl. Wilkinson plays Simon, who takes his girlfriend Donna (Diane Morgan) to meet his family at their home on the Isle of Wight for the first time.

In 2024, Wilkinson co-presented Joe & Katherine's Bargain Holidays with Katherine Ryan on Channel 4. It was on this show that Joe introduced the term 'mousie', which is a selfie taken from the perspective of a mouse.

In March 2025, he starred in the first series of LOL: Last One Laughing UK, hosted by Jimmy Carr & Roisin Conaty, alongside Richard Ayoade, Sara Pascoe, Lou Sanders, Rob Beckett, Judi Love, Bob Mortimer, Joe Lycett, Daisy May Cooper & Harriet Kemsley

In May 2025, Wilkinson was announced as a contestant on the first series of The Celebrity Traitors. Wilkinson was selected to play as a 'Faithful' but was eventually 'murdered' in the sixth episode.

In 2026, Wilkinson began hosting Train-ing It with Joe Wilkinson, an online Channel 4 interview series featuring conversations with celebrities during train journeys. In November 2026, the programme was renewed for two further series, with Richard Ayoade and Richard Osman announced as upcoming guests.

==== 8 Out of 10 Cats ====
Since 2012, Wilkinson has made semi-regular appearances on the 8 Out of 10 Cats spin-off show 8 Out of 10 Cats Does Countdown. He generally participates in the show's latter half and occasionally acts as Rachel Riley's assistant. He often appears in costumes, performs stunts and brings on special guests, and routinely refers to the show's regular model, Fabio (played by Robert Deaton), as his half-brother. In 2012, during the special episode of 8 Out of 10 Cats Does Deal or No Deal?, Wilkinson made a special appearance as the banker's assistant.

=== Stand-up ===
Wilkinson has performed two major tours: My Mum's Called Stella and My Dad's Called Brian and The Joe Wilkinson Experience.

=== Commercials ===
In 2014, Wilkinson appeared in a commercial for Hellmann's Mayonnaise with Sue Barker and Brian Blessed, and in 2015, Wilkinson began voicing ads for Hotels.com.

He and Keira Knightley starred in the Waitrose adverts for Christmas 2025 and Christmas 2026.

=== Other work ===
In June 2015, Wilkinson appeared in a live recording for the Pappy's Flatshare Slamdown. From the beginning of the show, he was quite inebriated and had to be substituted with a member of the audience when he left to get himself another glass of wine. The episode was published in August 2017.

In 2019, Wilkinson took part in a special episode of The Great British Bake Off for Stand Up to Cancer, with Georgia Toffolo, Jeremy Paxman and Sally Lindsay. He made gherkin-inspired biscuits in round one, which host Paul Hollywood loved, and won first place. Round 2 was chocolate crumpets, which also won first place. Round 3 was to bake a cake representing a hobby: he chose a chocolate orange cake to represent his "peachy bum" Rear of the Year award, again coming first. Overall, Wilkinson won Star Baker.

=== Podcasts ===
==== Gossipmongers ====
In 2019 Wilkinson, David Earl, and Poppy Hillstead began a podcast called Gossipmongers, a weekly podcast where listeners send in unsubstantiated rumours. At the end of each episode they choose their favourite piece of gossip from that episode. In September 2020 Hillstead was removed from the podcast. The podcast ended in February 2022. Earl and Wilkinson have both suggested there are no plans to bring it back.

==== Chatabix ====
In 2021, David Earl and Joe Wilkinson began a podcast called Chatabix, originally a daily weekday podcast recorded very early in the morning. From the summer of 2023 the podcast changed to being 3 episodes a week released Tuesday, Wednesday, and Thursday.

==== My New Football Club ====
In 2021, David Earl and Joe Wilkinson began a podcast called My New Football Club. Wilkinson left the podcast in 2022 due to being unable to commit time to it. The show is now presented by Earl, Jon Beer and Alfie Indra. The podcast was originally about David becoming a new fan of Exeter City but now provides regular updates on Exeter City including interviews with staff as well as famous fans of other teams.

==== My Mate's a Footballer ====
In 2023, Joe Wilkinson and Patrick Bamford began a weekly podcast titled My Mate's a Footballer, centered around Wilkinson's dream to be best mates with a footballer. The two discuss the ins and outs of professional sport, with Bamford able to give insight into the dressing room of Leeds United.

== Personal life ==
Wilkinson and his wife, Petra Exton, live in Brighton. He has a stepson.

Wilkinson has described his life as "boring" but argues it has been useful in giving him material for his stand-up act. He is a supporter of Gillingham F.C.

== Filmography ==
=== Film ===
Year	Title	Role	Notes
2008	Monster from Bikini Beach	Luau Burdett	
2010	England's Worst Ever Football Team	Himself	Documentary
2012	Eggbox	Fast Eddie	Television film
2014	The Feeling Nuts Comedy Night	Himself	
2015	SuperBob	The Postman	
2023	7 Minutes	Jim	Short film directed by Ricky Gervais
2026	Ghosts: The Possession of Button House	Graeme	

=== Television ===
Key
†	Denotes television productions that have not yet been released

Year	Title	Role	Notes
2010–13	Him & Her	Dan Perkins	Main role
2011–19	8 Out of 10 Cats	Himself	Guest panellist (20 episodes)
2011	The Rob Brydon Show	Himself	1 episode
2011	Comedy Lab	Sheriff	Episode: "Rick and Peter"
2011	Show and Tell	Himself	2 episodes
2011	The Wright Stuff	Himself	Guest panellist (1 episode)
2012–present	8 Out of 10 Cats Does Countdown	Himself	Rachel Riley's assistant; frequent panellist/guest team captain (48 episodes)
2012	Russell Howard's Good News	Himself	1 episode
2012	Live at the Electric	Various characters	8 episodes
2013	Have I Got News for You	Himself	6 episodes
2013	Edinburgh Comedy Fest Live	Himself	1 episode
2013–14	Miranda	Norman	3 episodes
2014	Derek	Cliff	2 episodes
2014	24 Hours To Go Broke	Himself	1 episode
2014–15	Celebrity Squares	Himself	Resident comedian (15 episodes)
2015	Russell Howard's Stand Up Central	Himself	1 episode
2016	Taskmaster	Himself	Contestant (5 episodes)
2016	Rovers	Lee	Also writer, associate producer
2017	Still Open All Hours	Wayne	1 episode
2018	The Crystal Maze	Himself	Contestant (1 episode)
2019	Comedians Watching Football with Friends	Himself	
2019	Moominvalley	Hemulen Fisherman and Park Keeper (Voice)	2 episodes
2019–2021	The Cockfields	Simon	10 episodes, also co-writer
2019–2023	Sex Education	Jeffrey	8 episodes
2019–2022	After Life	Pat	Main role; 3 series
2022	Outsiders	Himself	Series 2
2022	Not Going Out	Keith	1 episode
2022	Hobby Man	Himself	1 episode
2022	Prince Andrew: The Musical	Newspaper vendor	
2023	Would I Lie to You?	Himself	1 episode
2024	The Completely Made-Up Adventures of Dick Turpin	Geoffrey The Gaoler	3 episodes
2024	Douglas Is Cancelled	Tom	Miniseries
2024	Joe & Katherine's Bargain Holidays	Himself	6 episodes
2025	LOL: Last One Laughing UK	Himself	Contestant; series one
2025	The Celebrity Traitors	Himself	Contestant; series one
2026	Joe & David’s Magical Sitcom Tour	Himself	Three-part series with David Earl
2026	The Great Stand Up to Cancer Bake Off	Himself	Contestant; series nine
2026	The Reluctant Vampire	Wilf	6 episodes
2026	Number 10 †		Upcoming comedy-drama series
TBA	The Friend Ship †	Himself	Upcoming six-part series with Joe Marler
