= Half Light (film) =

2006 film by Craig Rosenberg

- Theatrical release poster
- Directed by: Craig Rosenberg
- Written by: Craig Rosenberg
- Produced by: Joel B. Michaels; Garth H. Drabinsky; Steve Samuels; Clive Parsons; Andreas Grosch
- Starring: Demi Moore; Hans Matheson; James Cosmo; Henry Ian Cusick; Kate Isitt; Therese Bradley
- Cinematography: Ashley Rowe
- Edited by: Bill Murphy
- Music by: Brett Rosenberg
- Production companies: Lakeshore Entertainment; Samuels Media; VIP Medienfonds 3; Rising Star
- Distributed by: Universal Pictures (United Kingdom, through United International Pictures); First Look Home Entertainment (United States)
- Release dates: January 17, 2006 (United States); June 23, 2006 (United Kingdom)
- Running time: 110 minutes
- Countries: United Kingdom; United States
- Language: English
- Budget: $2.4 million
- Box office: $4.6 million

Half Light is a 2006 romantic thriller film written and directed by Craig Rosenberg. It stars Demi Moore as a successful novelist who moves to a small Scottish village to move on with her life after the moving death of her son. Hans Matheson, James Cosmo, Henry Ian Cusick, Kate Isitt and Therese Bradley appear in supporting roles.

== Plot ==
Rachel Carlson is a successful American murder mystery author living in London with her five-year-old son, Thomas, and her second husband, Brian, a successful book editor who has been unable to get any of his own works published. His mother being too busy working on her latest novel to play with him, Thomas goes to play outside their canal side home, only to drown, which devastates Rachel and puts a tailspin on her marriage and her ability to finish her latest novel.

Several months later, Rachel still blames herself for the death of her son. She is unable to finish her book and is also a signature away from formally being divorced from her husband. In an effort to finish her novel and to find some peace, Rachel moves away to a remote cottage on the Scottish coast. However, she soon starts to see the ghost of her late son, who at one point drags her into the water and at another point moves a set of magnets on the refrigerator. A local town psychic informs Rachel that the spirit of her son is trying to tell her something, but the rest of the locals warn Rachel that the psychic is just a troubled woman.

Troubled by the possibility that her son has returned from the grave, Rachel shares her troubles with a young and handsome lighthouse keeper, named Angus, and the two spark a romance that suddenly goes awry when she learns that Angus seven years ago killed himself after he murdered his wife and her lover in the lighthouse. Rachel fears that she may be going insane, and her efforts to prove otherwise and to learn more about the murder-suicide, falter when the news articles about the tragedy have gone missing from the local library, and Sharon Winton, her best friend and writer for a British tabloid journal, goes missing after Rachel saw her killed by Angus in the lighthouse.

It eventually comes to light that her soon to be ex-husband has been having an affair with her best friend and that they paid a man, Patrick, to pose as Angus to cause an already-emotionally unstable Rachel to act so crazy in public that when they make her murder look like a suicide, no one will suspect foul play. Just as Rachel is about to leave town since she is convinced that her dead son is trying to warn her that her life is in danger, she is drugged by Sharon and Brian and is dumped into the sea, only to be saved when the keys to the chains suddenly fall into the water and thus allow her to free herself. She makes her way to the lighthouse in an effort to seek some revenge. (It was previously written on a slate, "don't forget, look behind you", and Rachel heard her son repeating those lines in the water.)

However, after a brief fight at the lighthouse, Sharon hits her head and is killed in the kitchen, and Brian is murdered by Patrick, who is possessed by the spirit of Angus, in much the same way that Angus's wife and lover died seven years previously. Patrick then jumps from the tower, as Angus had done. Rachel leaves town with the promise that no one will be allowed to access the lighthouse so that Angus's spirit can finally rest. She returns to her home in London, where her son died, and she has decided to celebrate his life, instead of mourning his death.

== Cast ==
- Demi Moore as Rachel Carlson
- Hans Matheson as Angus McCulloch
- Henry Ian Cusick as Brian
- Beans El-Balawi as Thomas Carlson
- Kate Isitt as Sharon Winton
- Nicholas Gleaves as Dr. Robert Freedman
- James Cosmo as Police Sergeant Finlay Murray
- Joanna Hole as Mary Murray
- Therese Bradley as Morag MacPherson
- Michael Wilson as Reverend James McMahon

== Production ==
=== Filming locations ===
- Ynys Llanddwyn, Anglesey, Wales
- Traeth Llanddwyn, Anglesey, Wales
- Malltraeth Bay, Anglesey, UK
- Llanbadrig Church, Cemaes Bay, Anglesey, Wales
- Prichard Jones Institute, Newborough, Anglesey, Wales (Library & Bingo scene)
- Porthdinllaen, Gwynedd, Wales
- Tŷ Coch Inn, Porthdinllaen, Gwynedd, Wales
- Betws y Coed, Conwy, Wales (Scottish Highlands Aerial Shots)
- Millook, Cornwall, England
- Bodmin and Wenford Railway, Cornwall, England
- Primrose Hill, London, UK
- Ealing Studios, Ealing, London, UK (Studio)

== Release ==
In 2006, the film was released by Universal/UIP in Hungary, the US, Germany, the UK, Italy and Australia.

The UK Premiere of Half Light took place on 18 June 2006 at the Ucheldre Arts Centre in Holyhead, Anglesey, Wales. Various people who took part in the film were invited to the event. Filming Half Light has benefited the island economy by over £1.5 million ($2.7 million) according to Anglesey County Council.

== Reception ==
=== Critical response ===
On the review aggregator website Rotten Tomatoes, 29% of 7 critics' reviews are positive, with an average rating of 4.1/10.

Peter Bradshaw of The Guardian gave the film one out of five stars and described it as an "excruciating British-set supernatural thriller". Bradshaw also suggested that Demi Moore "may wish to forget about the whole business". Mark Kermode of the same newspaper called the film a "dumb-as-nuts chiller" and stated that "Craig Rosenberg clearly imagines that his target audience are morons and so flags up every salient plot point with conveniently placed newspaper headlines which are duly waved before the cameras".

In his review for the BBC, the critic Neil Smith wrote that the film was a "preposterous ghost yarn, which plays like an extended installment of Tales of the Unexpected set in a remote Scottish village so cliched it's practically Brigadoon" and had "a plot that's basically identical to that of recent supernatural stinker The Dark and you have a Half Light only halfwits will enjoy". Writing for DVD Talk, Scott Weinberg described the film as "a thriller with no thrills, a drama with no drive, and a romance with no heart" and added that "asking a veteran actor [Moore] to pull off a role like this is like asking an old-school baker to make you one single cookie".

=== Accolades ===
Year	Award	Category	Recipient	Result
2007	28th Young Artist Awards	Best Performance in a TV Movie, Miniseries or Special - Supporting Young Actor	Beans El-Balawi	Nominated
