= Alley Cats (TV series) =

British animated television series

- Promotional poster
- Genre: Adult animation; Animated sitcom; Black comedy
- Created by: Ricky Gervais
- Written by: Ricky Gervais
- Directed by: Ricky Gervais; Elliot Deer
- Voices of: Ricky Gervais; Tom Basden; Andrew Brooke; David Earl; Kerry Godliman; Jo Hartley; Diane Morgan
- Composer: Andy Burrows
- Country of origin: United Kingdom
- Original language: English
- No. of seasons: 1
- No. of episodes: 6

Production
- Executive producers: Ricky Gervais; Steven Shaw; James Stevenson Bretton; Ben Lole
- Producer: Hugo Donkin
- Editors: Rachel Brennan; Prakash Patel
- Running time: 15—17 minutes
- Production companies: Netflix Animation Studios; Derek Productions Limited; Shush Creative; Blink Industries

Original release
- Network: Netflix
- Release: 7 August 2026

Alley Cats is a British adult animated television series by Ricky Gervais for Netflix. Produced by Derek Productions Limited, Shush Creative and Blink Industries, the series was released on 7 August 2026, on Netflix. Critical reception for Alley Cats was predominantly negative.

== Voice cast ==
- Ricky Gervais as Gus, a cynical and lazy overweight ginger tabby cat
- Tom Basden as Rupert (aka Ponce), a logical, privileged chartreux
- Andrew Brooke as Fang, a rough-and-tumble tuxedo cat
- David Earl as Puke, a scrawny, scruffy, hyper-sexualised Havana Brown
- Kerry Godliman as Lara, a sarcastic silver tabby cat and Gus's love interest
- Jo Hartley as Kitten, a timid, innocent black kitten
- Diane Morgan as Olive, Gus's dim-witted half-sister
- Natalie Cassidy as Gus's mum, Gus's old, ailing mother
- Tony Way as Drug Dealer, a large and overweight tabby cat of a shady personality that works as a drug kingpin

== Episodes ==
| No. | Title | Directed by | Written by | Original release date |
|---|---|---|---|---|
| 1 | "Lost" | Ricky Gervais | Ricky Gervais | 7 August 2026 |
A trio of alley cats, Gus, Fang and Puke, watch great white sharks and snakes on TV and then go hunting for mice in a churchyard before being joined by fellow cats Ponce and Olive (the latter being Gus' half-sister). They see an elderly man's funeral. While having a conversation about how they each want to die, a lost kitten approaches them. Olive convinces the others to help Kitten find her home. After they fail to do so, the gang witnesses Gus' friend, Ralfy, get fatally hit by a car. As Ralfy lies dead, Kitten strokes him. Gus explains the concept of death to Kitten, upsetting her. As Kitten cries, Gus picks her up and lets her sleep next to him.
| 2 | "Havoc" | Ricky Gervais | Ricky Gervais | 7 August 2026 |
After seeing riots on television, the gang decide to kill the biggest thing they can take down together: a fat kid. They see a fat schoolboy walking on the street and the gang decide to target him. However, when Gus lunges at the boy, he inadvertently causes a car crash. Whilst looking for Kitten's home, they come across an elderly friend of theirs, Old Pete, who is on his way to be euthanised. Mourning Pete, the gang quits the search for the day. Gus then comforts Kitten, who does not wish to die.
| 3 | "Kids" | Ricky Gervais | Ricky Gervais | 7 August 2026 |
Puke reveals he has three sons from a one-night stand with a blind white cat and visits his sons with the gang. He expresses that they have grown up decently without him around, due to his constant sexual antics. Gus then briefly visits his old, ailing mother. Looking for Kitten's home, they come across a crying cat named Lara whose boyfriend beats up Gus for standing up for her. Lara then dumps her boyfriend for Gus. That night, Gus comforts Kitten by telling her about the privileges of life and being a cat.
| 4 | "Date Night" | Ricky Gervais | Ricky Gervais | 7 August 2026 |
The gang attempt to try and get Puke adopted but this instead results in an elderly woman taking Gus home and grooming him. When he returns, the gang go out to look for Kitten's home again. They come across Lara and who Gus struggles to ask out on a date due to his "player" attitude. The two eventually go out for the evening and stop in a cemetery where they catch mice together.
| 5 | "Mum" | Ricky Gervais | Ricky Gervais | 7 August 2026 |
Kitten falls ill with a fever. After Gus reluctantly prays to God to make her better, Kitten heals. She explains that she had a dream which gives the gang clues to where her home is. On their way, they encounter Lara who confronts Gus over his fear of commitment. Olive arrives and informs Gus his mother is dying. Visiting her, Kitten falsely identifies herself as Gus' daughter, allowing his mother to die in peace. Depressed, Gus decides to purchase catnip from the local drug dealer for everyone (excluding Ponce and Kitten). At their home, they lie on the sofa, hallucinating.
| 6 | "Home" | Ricky Gervais | Ricky Gervais | 7 August 2026 |
After a conversation about bees, the gang go out to find and eat some despite Ponce's warnings. At a playground, a teenage boy kicks Kitten off a slide. Fang retaliates by pushing him off a halfpipe, apparently killing him. Olive eats a bee which stings her tongue, causing it to swell. This inspires Puke to get his penis stung so it can grow bigger. However, it ends up stinging his testicles. Seeing Lara at a party in the local park, Gus rejects her request for a dance. Arriving at Kitten's home, Gus discovers that her family have replaced her. He lies to Kitten, telling her that her family moved away, though she reveals shortly after that she knows the truth and accepts the gang as her family. The gang come across the party again where Kitten encourages Gus to dance with Lara. Olive tells Ponce of her crush on him, only for him to tell her that he is unable to impregnate her due to him being neutered, disappointing her. She then leaves with another tomcat with testicles. Ponce and Kitten dance with Gus and Lara while Fang and Puke watch on.

== Release ==
In June 2026, the series was revealed via a trailer. Alley Cats premiered on 7 August on Netflix.

== Reception ==
Alley Cats topped the UK Netflix chart in its first week despite receiving largely negative reviews from critics, many of whom criticised its writing, pacing, and reliance on shock humour, though a handful of reviewers found it more sweet-natured than expected.

On the review aggregator website Rotten Tomatoes, 20% of 20 critics' reviews are positive, with an average rating of 3.4/10.

Writing for Screen Rant, Dani Kessel Odem described the series as an "uninspired, unfunny slog," singling out the animation as looking "incredibly cheap" and arguing that the show's humour and narrative both fell flat across its six episodes. Empire was similarly unimpressed, writing that the series was not so much offensive as simply "not very good," criticising an "unearned" emotional tone in each episode's closing minutes and describing much of the swearing-driven comedy as juvenile.

The Hollywood Reporter gave a mixed-to-negative assessment, finding the show's tonal shifts between crudeness and sentimentality unconvincing and concluding that it was "rarely all that funny," while allowing that the voice cast and character design showed some promise. HuffPost UK's roundup of critical reaction noted that several reviewers went further, with the show being labelled by some critics as among the worst television of the year. Writing in The Guardian, Lucy Mangan gave the show two stars out of five, calling it "lazy, crude and boring" and accusing Gervais of "indulging himself in lesser projects"; Mangan's colleague Rhik Samadder concurred, describing Alley Cats as "lazy, dated and far too pleased with itself." In a review for Metro, Tom Percival gave the show one star out of five, writing: "I knew Ricky Gervais' Alley Cats was going to be terrible, but Christ."

Not all reviews were negative. Variety described the series as "surprisingly bittersweet," praising an underlying melancholy that cut against Gervais's reputation for pure acerbity, though also noting that the show's compressed runtime left some subplots underdeveloped. John Cleese described the series as "quite wonderful" in a post on X.
