= Jo Hartley =

British actress

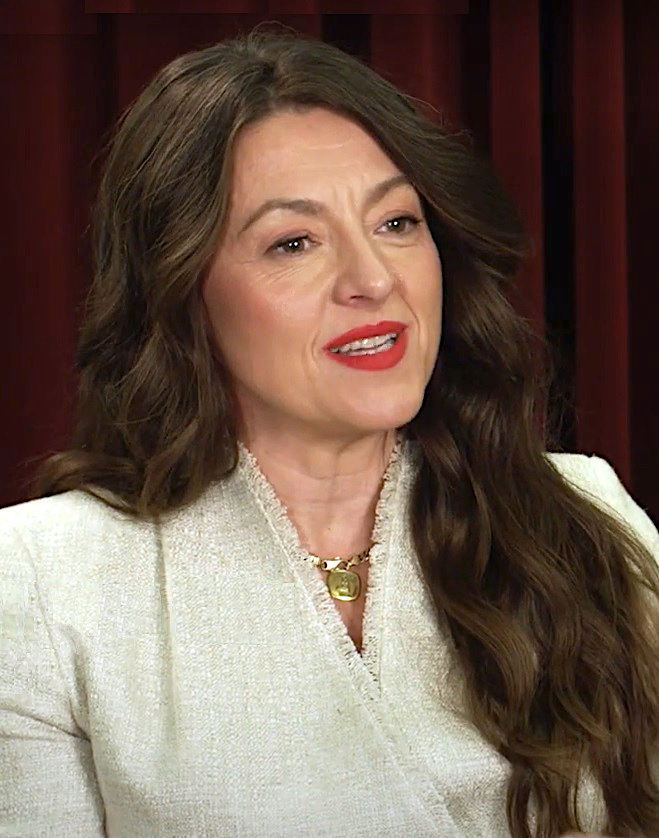
- Hartley at BIFA in 2021
- Born: 1971 or 1972 (age 54–55); Oldham, England
- Occupation: Actress
- Years active: 2004–present

Jo Hartley (born 1971 or 1972) is an English actress. She is known for her roles in the films Dead Man's Shoes (2004), This Is England (2006), The Young Victoria (2009), Torvill & Dean (2018), Slaughterhouse Rulez (2018), Eddie the Eagle (2016), Sweetheart (2021), and Bank of Dave (2023). Television credits include This Is England '86 (2010), Not Safe For Work (2015), In My Skin (2018), After Life (2019–2022), Mandy (2021), Das Boot (2022), Death in Paradise (2023), Passenger (2024), and Adolescence (2025).

== Early life and education ==
Hartley was born 1971 or 1972) in the Metropolitan Borough of Oldham, Lancashire, England, and brought up in a working-class family, attending North Chadderton School in Chadderton. She started acting at the age of 11 in her school stage production of The Sound of Music as Gretel von Trapp.

She joined Oldham Theatre Workshop, developing her acting skills until the age of 17, when she stopped acting to work at British Aerospace on a Youth Training Scheme. She worked as a secretary there for two years before leaving to join Japan Airlines as a flight attendant.

In her mid-twenties, Hartley left the aviation industry to pursue a career as an actor. Hartley returned to England, in London studying at the Questors Theatre in Ealing, where she studied method acting and Stanislavski's system until landing her first film role in 2004.

== Career ==
Hartley had her debut film role in the 2004 Shane Meadows directed Crime Drama Thriller film Dead Man's Shoes as 'Marie'. She went on to appear in many British productions, including films such as Northern Soul and Me and Her both in 2004; Terra Firma and Flushed in 2008; and The Crossing, Janet and Bernard and I Don't Care in 2014. Hartley has been a character actor in many TV films and TV series since 2004, with her most notable roles in This Is England '86, This Is England '88 and This Is England '90, the follow-on TV mini-series to the film. In movies Hartley has appeared in This Is England (2006) as Cynthia, and the feature film The Young Victoria in 2009, with Emily Blunt and Rupert Friend.

In 2016 Hartley appeared as Janette, Eddie's mother in the film Eddie the Eagle appearing alongside Taron Egerton and Hugh Jackman. She co-starred in the David Cross series Bliss opposite Heather Graham as one of two partners of a fraudulent travel writer. Hartley also appeared in the comedy horror film Slaughterhouse Rulez, alongside Asa Butterfield and Simon Pegg.

After a successful pilot episode, Hartley played the role of Bethan's mum, Katrina, who has bipolar disorder in the BBC series In My Skin which aired on BBC1 in 2020. In April 2020, Hartley returned as June in the second series of Ricky Gervais's After Life.

In January 2021, Hartley joined the Rising Star Award jury of the EE British Academy Film Awards to select the shortlist for the 2021 award, alongside Alicia Vikander, Naomi Ackie and several other prominent figures of the industry. In November 2021, Hartley was nominated for the BIFA for Best Supporting Actress for her performance as Tina in the Marley Morrison directed British drama film Sweetheart.

In December 2021, Hartley had a guest-role appearance in the BBC's Mandy Christmas special—We Wish You A Mandy Christmas alongside Diane Morgan and Johnny Vegas. In 2022, Hartley landed a recurring role in four episodes of series 3, of the Sky One German U-boat series Das Boot, alongside Tom Wlaschiha.

In 2023, Hartley starred as 'Nicola', wife of Burnley banker Dave Fishwick (played by Rory Kinnear) in the film Bank of Dave, released on Netflix in January 2023.

In April 2024, Hartley played the lead character in the British comedy film Swede Caroline.

== Filmography ==
Key
†	Denotes works that have not yet been released

=== Film ===
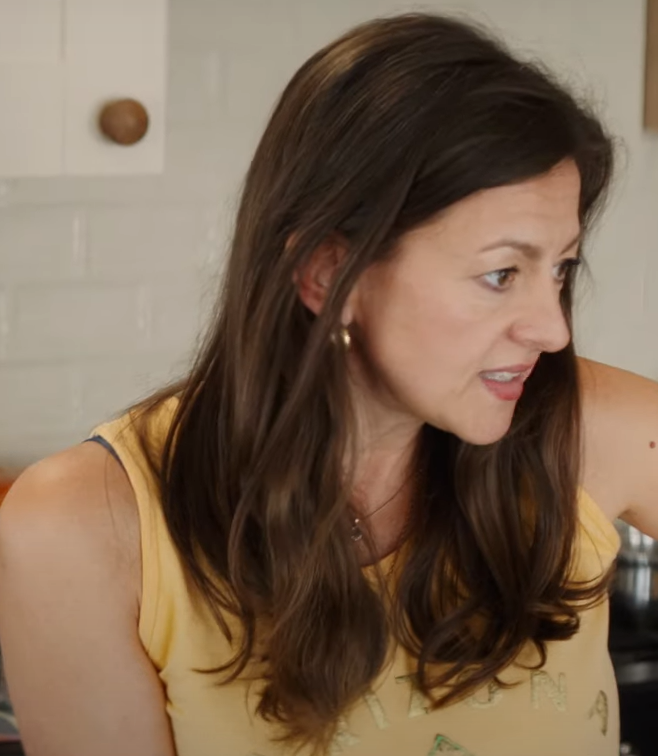
Jo Hartley in Sweetheart 2021

Year	Title	Role
2004	Dead Man's Shoes	Marie
2004	Northern Soul (short film)	Jo Sherbert
2004	Me and Her (short film)	Coleen
2006	This Is England	Cynthia
2007	Bigboy_74 (short film)	Woman
2008	Terra Firma (short film)	Debbie
2008	Flushed (short film)	Mrs Mop
2009	The Young Victoria	Landlady
2010	Soulboy	Monica
2011	Inbred	Kate
2011	At Dusk (short film)	Woman
2012	Up There	Margaret
2012	When the Lights Went Out	Jeanette
2012	Ill Manors	Carol
2014	The Crossing (short film)	Juliet
2014	Janet and Bernard (short film)	Janet
2014	I Don't Care (short film)	Mandy
2015	Sea Change (short film)	See awards
2016	Eddie the Eagle	Janette Edwards
2016	David Brent: Life on the Road	Pauline Gray
2016	Prevenge	Midwife
2016	Gibberish (short film)	Mother
2016	Access All Areas	Libby
2018	Slaughterhouse Rulez	Babs Wallace
2018	Torvill & Dean	Betty Torvill
2021	Sweetheart	Tina
2023	Bank of Dave	as Nicola Fishwick
2024	Swede Caroline	Caroline

=== Television ===
Year	Title	Role	Notes
2007	Recovery	Vicky Nathan	Television film
2009	Crying with Laughter	Karen	Television film
2009	Casualty 1900s	Anna Baker	2 episodes
2010	Pulse	Loz Westmoor	Television film
2010	This Is England '86	Cynthia	4 episodes
2010	Moving On	Natalie	1 episode
2011	Waterloo Road	Laura Taylor	1 episode
2011	Stolen	April Harris	Television film
2011	The Jury	Ann Skailes	5 episodes
2011	This Is England '88	Cynthia Fields	3 episodes
2012	Coming Up	Mandy Slade	1 episode: "Postcode Lottery"
2013	Law & Order: UK	Lindsey Donovan	1 episode
2013	Privado	Sally	3 episodes
2013–2014	The Mimic	Jean	11 episodes
2015	Not Safe for Work	Angela	6 episodes
2015	This Is England '90	Cynthia Fields	4 episodes
2016	Vera	Grace	1 episode: "Tuesday's Child"
2018	Bliss	Denise Larkspur	6 episodes
2018–2021	In My Skin	Katrina Gwyndaf	Main role
2019	Don't Forget the Driver	Mel	Episode 4
2019	Temple	Professor Kirby	Episode 5
2020	Sick of It	Lillie	1 episode
2019–2022	After Life	June	Recurring series 1; main role series 2–3;
2021	The Cleaner	Maggie	1 episode 1.6
2021	Mandy	Mrs Carter; Flower seller	Christmas Special We Wish You a Mandy Christmas
2022	Das Boot	Daisy Swinburne	Season 3 – 4 episodes
2023	Death in Paradise	Raya West	Season 12 episode 2
2024	Passenger	Linda Markel	6 episodes
2025	Adolescence	Mrs. Fenumore	1 episode 1.2
2026	Alley Cats	Kitten (voice)	6 episodes

== Awards ==
Year	Award	Category	Work	Result	Ref
2015	International Christian Film & Music Festival	Best Actress – Short film	Sea Change	Won	
2017	Underwire Film Festival	Best Actor	Gibberish	Nominated	
2021	British Independent Film Awards	Best Supporting Actress	Sweetheart	Nominated	
2024	National Film Awards UK	Best Actress	Swede Caroline	Nominated	
