= Brian and Charles =

2022 film by Jim Archer

- Theatrical release poster
- Directed by: Jim Archer
- Screenplay by: David Earl; Chris Hayward
- Based on: Brian and Charles by Jim Archer
- Produced by: Rupert Majendie
- Starring: David Earl; Chris Hayward
- Cinematography: Murren Tullett
- Edited by: Jo Walker
- Music by: Daniel Pemberton
- Production companies: BFI; Film4 Productions; Mr Box Productions
- Distributed by: Focus Features (United States); Universal Pictures (International)
- Release dates: 23 January 2022 (Sundance); 17 June 2022 (United States); 8 July 2022 (United Kingdom)
- Running time: 90 minutes
- Countries: United Kingdom; United States
- Language: English
- Box office: $860,850

Brian and Charles is a 2022 science fiction comedy drama film directed by Jim Archer, in his feature debut, from a screenplay by David Earl and Chris Hayward, who also star in the film. The film follows an eccentric loner who creates a robotic companion.

A feature-length adaptation of the trio's 2017 short film of the same name, Brian and Charles premiered at the 2022 Sundance Film Festival. The film was released in the United States on 17 June 2022 and in the United Kingdom on 8 July 2022.

== Plot ==
Brian Gittins is a lonely inventor in rural Wales, who builds quirky contraptions that seldom work. One day while scavenging scrap, he comes across a mannequin's head, which inspires him to attempt to create an artificially-intelligent robot, though he is unable to activate it. That night, during a thunderstorm, Brian discovers his activated robot wandering outside of his workshop, and Brian brings it into his house.

The following morning, Brian discovers that the robot has learned the English language by reading a dictionary, and it gives itself the name Charles Petrescu. Brian begins spending time playing with Charles and showing him around his property. The childlike Charles becomes more curious and eager to explore more of the world, but Brian instructs him to stay nearby at all times.

Eventually, Brian begins driving Charles into town while working as a handyman, though he instructs Charles to stay in his truck. He is eventually discovered by Hazel, a woman whose mother Brian does work for and whom Brian has an affection for. Brian pleads with Hazel to keep him a secret, but Hazel is impressed and allows Brian to take her and Charles to walk around a nearby lake, and he successfully asks her to go out again.

Charles becomes more and more eager to explore the outside world, but Brian is adamant that he cannot, leading to a falling out between them. One day, Eddie, a local bully, along with his two spoiled teenage daughters, come across Charles and approach Brian to purchase him, but Brian refuses, leading to Eddie shoving Brian to the ground. The next day, Brian comes home from work to find his front door pulled off its hinges and Charles having disappeared. He and Hazel find Charles at Eddie's, but Eddie claims that Charles came on his own. Brian and Hazel learn that Eddie intends to burn Charles in a bonfire later that night. Distraught, Brian and Hazel return to his house, and Hazel praises him for having been able to make Charles at all. The two work together to build something.

Brian and Hazel return to the bonfire, where Brian saves Charles just in time before he catches fire. Eddie and his family chase Brian, Charles and Hazel into town where the rest of the town gathers. The citizens confront Eddie on his thieving, and with the help of the inventions Brian made, he and Charles send Eddie and his family away.

The next morning, Brian, accepting Charles's adventurous nature, gifts him with a pass that will allow him to travel the world. Brian and Hazel both bid Charles farewell at the train station before leaving together. During the credits, pictures of Charles are shown with various landmarks and buildings of the numerous cities he has visited.

== Cast ==
- David Earl as Brian Gittins
- Chris Hayward as Charles Petrescu
- Louise Brealey as Hazel
- Jamie Michie as Eddie
- Nina Sosanya as Pam
- Lynn Hunter as Winnie
- Lowri Izzard as Katrina
- Mari Izzard as Suki
- Cara Chase as June
- Sunil Patel as Phil
- Rishi Nair as Stephen Alderton
- Colin Bennett as Arthur

== Production ==
Film4 Productions boarded the feature-length adaptation of Archer, Earl and Hayward's short film in early 2019, followed by the BFI. Principal photography took place on location in rural North Wales, including Cwm Penmachno and Llyn Gwynant, during the COVID-19 pandemic.

== Release ==
The film premiered at the Sundance Film Festival on 23 January 2022. A few days later, Focus Features acquired worldwide distribution rights to the film, with its parent Universal Pictures handling international distribution in international territories on its behalf. Brian and Charles grossed $860,850 worldwide.

== Reception ==
On the review aggregator website Rotten Tomatoes, 85% of 97 critics' reviews are positive, with an average rating of 7/10. The website's consensus reads: "Brian and Charles may test the patience of quirk-resistant viewers, but the innate charm of this odd couple comedy is easy to compute." Metacritic, which uses a weighted average, assigned the film a score of 66 out of 100, based on 29 critics, indicating "generally favorable" reviews.

=== Accolades ===
At the Sundance Film Festival: London 2022, which Jim Archer attended, the film won the Audience Favourite award.

In 2023, it was nominated for the BAFTA Award for Outstanding British Film.
