= Happiness (British TV series) =

- Genre: Comedy drama
- Starring: Paul Whitehouse; Fiona Allen; Mark Heap; Clive Russell; Pearce Quigley; Johnny Vegas
- Country of origin: United Kingdom
- Original language: English
- No. of series: 2
- No. of episodes: 12 (list of episodes)

Production
- Running time: 30 minutes

Original release
- Network: BBC Two
- Release: 20 March 2001 – 18 February 2003

Happiness is a British television drama written by Paul Whitehouse and David Cummings, with Whitehouse starring in the lead role.

Two series were broadcast on BBC Two in 2001 and 2003. Whitehouse stated that there would not be a third.

== Synopsis ==
Whitehouse plays Danny Spencer, a successful voice artist for a popular cartoon bear called Dexter. Spencer is trying to come to terms with the death of his wife, though much of his concern is that he finds he isn't feeling the loss as deeply as he should.

Approaching his 40th birthday he is independent and single and the programme's themes are largely bound up with the opportunities and problems that this situation creates. His friends are a disparate group, ranging from the strait-laced Terry and Rachel (Mark Heap, Fiona Allen), through the down and outs – Charlie and Sid (Johnny Vegas and Pearce Quigley), to the archetypal man in a mid-life crisis, Angus (Clive Russell). To varying degrees these friends offer Spencer inspiration and cautionary tales as to how Spencer can fill his life.

== Episodes ==
=== Series 1 (2001) ===
No. overall	No. in series	Title	Directed by	Written by	Original release date
1	1	"Personality Crisis"	Declan Lowney	Dave Cummings and Paul Whitehouse	20 March 2001
2	2	"I'm Doing It for Me"	Declan Lowney	Dave Cummings and Paul Whitehouse	27 March 2001
3	3	"Chained to an Idiot"	Declan Lowney	Dave Cummings and Paul Whitehouse	3 April 2001
4	4	"Desperate Dan"	Declan Lowney	Dave Cummings and Paul Whitehouse	10 April 2001
5	5	"Celebration"	Declan Lowney	Dave Cummings and Paul Whitehouse	17 April 2001
6	6	"Forty"	Declan Lowney	Dave Cummings and Paul Whitehouse	24 April 2001

=== Series 2 (2003) ===
No. overall	No. in series	Title	Directed by	Written by	Original release date
7	1	"A Little Bit of Love"	Declan Lowney	Dave Cummings and Paul Whitehouse	14 January 2003
8	2	"A Nice Person"	Declan Lowney	Dave Cummings and Paul Whitehouse	21 January 2003
9	3	"Real Dancing"	Declan Lowney	Dave Cummings and Paul Whitehouse	28 January 2003
10	4	"Perspective"	Declan Lowney	Dave Cummings and Paul Whitehouse	4 February 2003
11	5	"Old Bloke at the Door"	Declan Lowney	Dave Cummings and Paul Whitehouse	11 February 2003
12	6	"People Move On"	Declan Lowney	Dave Cummings and Paul Whitehouse	18 February 2003

== Awards ==
- British Comedy Awards, 2001
  - Won
    - Johnny Vegas, best newcomer for his role as Charlie.
  - Nominations
    - Best TV Comedy drama.
- British Academy Television Awards, 2002
  - Nominations
    - Situation comedy award.

== Critical reception ==
Simon Hoggart described the series as "part of that newish genre, the situation tragedy", and Andrew Billen criticised it for the "emptiness at its heart and not enough going on peripherally to make up for it". Nicholas Barber described it as "an impressive leap from catchphrase-heavy sketch comedy" with "topnotch supporting actors". Many reviews identified Johnny Vegas's performance as being the strongest among the cast.
