= Karl Davies =

English actor

- Born: 6 August 1982 (age 44); Marple, Greater Manchester, England
- Occupations: Actor; voice actor
- Years active: 2000–present

Karl Davies (born 6 August 1982) is an English actor who portrayed Lyle Anderson in the TV series Kingdom. Previously, he had portrayed Robert Sugden in the ITV soap opera Emmerdale. He played Alton Lannister in Game of Thrones.

== Career ==
Davies took over the role of Robert Sugden in the soap opera Emmerdale in August 2001. The change in actor allowed the character to be developed and he soon became involved in a number of controversial storylines, most involving a long running feud with his adoptive brother Andy Sugden. He also became known for a number of romantic storylines, with Robert having an increasing number of sexual partners, including Donna Windsor, Andy's wife Katie Sugden and 15-year-old Debbie Dingle, the mother of Andy's daughter.

As one of the young male characters in the show, he was invited to take part in a soap calendar for Now Magazine in 2004, alongside fellow actors Ben Freeman and Kelvin Fletcher.

The character's final romantic storyline involved an affair with the married Sadie King, played by Patsy Kensit. This storyline received media attention when Kensit reportedly objected to a relationship with a younger actor. Kensit, however, clarified the reasons for this in an interview with Leeds Today News, stating "When I first heard about the storyline, I said 'but he looks like one of James's friends, so boyish and young'. But Karl is so adorable and we had a lot of fun filming those scenes". James is Kensit's son.

The brotherly feud which dominated much of Davies' time on the show was used by producers as the vehicle for a high-profile attempt to compete with rival soap EastEnders in the television ratings war, and to secure Emmerdale's place as the second most popular soap opera in the UK. The chosen storyline involved Andy's attempt to kill Robert which led to his father and Andy's adoptive father, Jack Sugden (Clive Hornby) being shot. The story was to prove a success, securing viewing figures of 7.6 million compared with 6.4 million for EastEnders. This was the first time Emmerdale had secured such a ratings victory.

For his final and highly publicised storyline, it was made clear to the media weeks in advance that either Robert, Andy or local vet Max King would be killed in an explosive road accident.

Along with the production of Dolphins, Davies also spent 2006 filming an ITV television series, Kingdom, opposite Stephen Fry, Celia Imrie, Hermione Norris and Tony Slattery. It followed the story of a solicitor (Fry) living in a quiet seaside village in Norfolk. Davies played a trainee solicitor Lyle Anderson, who dreams of escaping Market Shipborough, where the show is set, to work in the city.

In 2010, Davies played multiple characters on stage in the Tricycle Theatre's The Great Game: Afghanistan. The play consisted of 12 separate one-act plays (each by a different author) about Afghanistan. The production's tour includes stops in California, Minnesota, New York, and Washington, D.C. Davies appears in four segments, frequently as a soldier. In 2011 Davies was cast in the second series of the fantasy epic Game of Thrones as Alton Lannister. The following year he was cast in the second series of the BBC1 drama series The Syndicate.

In 2014 Davies appeared in two episodes of the drama series The Crimson Field, set in a field hospital during World War I. His character, Corporal Lawrence Prentiss, begins to suffer from combat fatigue and shell shock, and by the time of his second appearance is "completely psychologically damaged" by his experience of war. In preparation for the role, Davies watched surviving footage of shell-shock sufferers from the first world war, and was shocked by the extent of their condition. Also that year, Davies starred in the disaster film Black Sea, in which his character dismisses the protagonist Captain Robinson (Jude Law) from his job. In April 2014 he began appearing in the crime thriller Happy Valley as Daniel Cawood. He returned for a second series of the drama in 2016.

== Personal life ==
Prior to becoming a professional actor, Davies enjoyed extreme sports and competed in climbing competitions at the age of 14, 15 and 16, but never pursued this further than local competitions at a junior level. He has expressed a love of extreme sports such as snowboarding and skiing. During his time on Emmerdale, he publicly stated that he was prevented from participating in these activities by the producers. His only real exception to this was as part of the annual charity fund-raising event in Inverurie, where he was allowed to go wing walking on a biplane, an experience he greatly enjoyed.

Davies has revealed that his role in Emmerdale led to much greater public recognition, and that the reaction from fans of the show was mixed: he was insulted and slapped in the street by strangers who were unable to tell him apart from the character he played. Simultaneously, he developed a following amongst gay viewers, and received a lot of fan mail from male viewers.

== Selected filmography ==
=== Film ===
Year	Title	Role	Notes
2006	Me and Her	Damien	Short film
2007	Octane	Brent Black	
2009	Spunkbubble	Tech Officer Harris	Short film
2014	Black Sea	Liam	
2014	The Quiet Hour	Jude	
2014	Home for Christmas	Matt Jones	
2015	Virtuoso	Sigmund	Television film
2015	Nipplejesus	The Disturbed Man	Short film
2015	NSFW	Daniel Greed	Short film
2016	Fractured	Michael	
2018	Cur:few	Wyatt	Short film
2026	Flocked Male Mallard	Thomas	Short film
2026	Last Orders	Ash	Short film
TBA	Second Serve	Richard	

=== Television ===
Year	Title	Role	Notes
2000	Fat Friends	Rick Ashburn	Episode: "Fat Chance"
2000–2001	Peak Practice	Nick Pullen	Series 9–11
2001	The Bill	Danny Lloyd	Episode: "Crush"
2001–2005, 2009	Emmerdale	Robert Sugden	176 episodes
2002	The Hidden City	Clive	21 episodes
2007	Dead Clever	Nathan	
2007	A Very British Sex Scandal	Johnny Reynolds	
2007–2009	Kingdom	Lyle Anderson	Series 1–3
2008	The Unsinkable Titanic	John G. "Jack" Phillips	
2010	Midsomer Murders	Luke Woodley	Episode: "The Made-to-Measure Murders"
2011	The Case	Dan Stanley	5 episodes
2012	Game of Thrones	Alton Lannister	3 episodes
2013	The Syndicate	Luke	Series 2
2014	Castles in the Sky	Skip Wilkins	
2014–2023	Happy Valley	Daniel Cawood	Series 1–3
2014	The Crimson Field	Lawrence Prentiss	2 episodes
2015	My Mad Fat Diary	Rob	3 episodes
2016	The People Next Door	Richard	
2016	Brief Encounters	Terry	6 episodes
2018	Shakespeare & Hathaway: Private Investigators	Leon Tarsich	Episode: "The Fairest Show Means Most Deceit"
2019	Chernobyl	Viktor Proskuryakov	3 episodes
2020	Call the Midwife	Ronald Mallen	1 episode
2021–2024	The Tower	DCI/DCS Tim Bailie	Series 1–3
2022	The Baby	Jack	3 episodes
2023	The Nevers	Lester Eason	2 episodes
2023	The Bay	Carl McGregor	Series 4
2026	Waterloo Road	Anthony Walters	Series 17
