= Me and Her =

- Directed by: Sarah Tripp
- Written by: Sarah Tripp
- Produced by: Beth Allan
- Starring: Karl Davies; Jo Hartley
- Cinematography: Ossie McLean
- Edited by: James Charkow
- Music by: Daniel Padden
- Distributed by: UK Film Council
- Release date: 22 August 2006
- Running time: 14 minutes
- Country: United Kingdom
- Language: English

Me and Her is a 2006 short film jointly commissioned by, the UK Film Council, Scottish Screen and Glasgow Media Access Centre. It is written and directed by Sarah Tripp and stars Karl Davies and Jo Hartley. The film follows the lives of two chambermaids working in an inner city hotel and was first screened at the Edinburgh Film Festival.

== Plot ==
Coleen, who works as a chambermaid at an inner city hotel, is joined by Damien, who has reluctantly taken a job at the hotel to earn some money during his summer vacation. Whilst working together, they discover an unexpected attraction to one another. It is during their last working day that they confront the significance of this relationship.

== Cast ==
Actor	Role
Karl Davies	Damien
Jo Hartley	Coleen
Sandra Adams	Chambermaid
Mirren Begbie	Chambermaid
Theresa McPhee	Chambermaid
Liz Miller	Chambermaid
Pauline More	Chambermaid
Doreen Sinclair	Chambermaid
