= Mandy (TV series) =

British comedy series

- Genre: Comedy
- Created by: Diane Morgan
- Written by: Diane Morgan; Ben Caudell (S4)
- Directed by: Diane Morgan
- Starring: Diane Morgan; Michelle Greenidge; Tom Basden; Yuriko Kotani; Michael Spicer; Mark Silcox; Alistair Green
- Opening theme: "Mandy" by Barry Manilow
- Country of origin: United Kingdom
- Original language: English
- No. of series: 4
- No. of episodes: 26

Production
- Executive producer: Diane Morgan
- Producers: Ben Caudell; Sam Ward; Kenny Tanner
- Editor: Jerry Ramsbottom
- Camera setup: Single-camera
- Running time: 15 minutes
- Production companies: BBC Studios; Witchcraft Industries

Original release
- Network: BBC Two
- Release: 25 July 2019 – present

Mandy is a British absurdist comedy series, created, written and directed by Diane Morgan, who also stars as the title character Mandy Carter. After a pilot in 2019, the first series was broadcast in August 2020 on BBC Two. A second series was commissioned by the BBC in July 2021, which aired in January 2022. A third series was confirmed in May 2023 and aired in March 2024. A fourth series was confirmed in January 2025 and aired in July 2025.

For her performance in the fourth series, Morgan was nominated for the British Academy Television Award for Best Female Comedy Performance.

== Production ==
Following a pilot episode that was filmed between 20 and 25 February 2019 and released on 25 July 2019, the BBC announced that Mandy had been commissioned for a full series in February 2020.

The first series was filmed in February 2020 and aired in mid August 2020. The second series was filmed in June 2021 and aired in early January 2022, with the 2021 Christmas special being released a month earlier in December 2021. The third series was filmed in October 2023 and aired in late March 2024. The fourth series was filmed in February 2025 and aired in mid July 2025. The 2025 Christmas special, The Mandy Who Knew Too Much, was scheduled to air on 22 December 2025, but was postponed last minute to allow for additional edits. The special is now expected to air in 2026.

== Filming ==
Filming took place across England, with the primary locations being in London (Brentford, Bethnal Green, Mile End, Leyton and Hackney), Hertfordshire (Berkhamsted, Hemel Hempstead, Rickmansworth, Borehamwood and Watford) and Buckinghamshire. The pilot episode was filmed in Brentford (191 High Street). In the "Broadsword to Donna Ball" episode, the pub scene was filmed at The Palm Tree, Mile End and the funeral scene in the same episode was filmed at Heath Lane Cemetery. The funeral scene in the Christmas Special was filmed at St Michael's, Chenies. Chenies Manor doubled as Brampton Hall in the first episode of the second series. Scenes in the "SpaceMandy" and "Fatberg" episodes were filmed at the BRE Testing complex in Watford. The library scene in the "Fatberg" episode was filmed at the Haberdashers' Girls' School; however, the leisure centre/pool scenes in the same episode were filmed at the Haberdashers' Boys' School. Scenes in the "Get Mandy Carter" episode of the third series were filmed at Gadebridge Park. In the "Career Ladder" episode, the church was St Paul’s Church in Sarratt. In the "Ballad of Mandy Carter" episode, Hemel Hempstead Hospital doubled as Crumbs Biscuit Factory. The line dancing competition in the "Susan Bloody Blower" episode of the first series, as well as the psychic show in the "Humandy Statue" episode of the third series, were filmed at the Boxmoor Playhouse.

== Main cast ==
- Diane Morgan as Mandy Carter - eponymous protagonist of the series who resides at number four on Bridgeport Street in Radcliffe, Lancashire. The episodes usually involve Mandy's employment disasters, and the effects they have on her best friend (Lola), her long-suffering benefits officer (Jason), and the people of Radcliffe. She slouches a lot when she walks, and has a messy haircut and purses her lips a lot. Morgan had previously appeared as a similar character called Mandy, who did unexpected things, in Rovers.
- Michelle Greenidge as Lola Okonedo Akimbo - Mandy's best friend, a British-Nigerian, at her eponymous nail salon on a Radcliffe high street. This character was initially portrayed by Gbemisola Ikumelo as Shola in the 2019 pilot, but was renamed and recast at the show's launch the following year. She often charges high prices to customers (including Mandy).
- Mark Silcox as various - most notably Abu, the recurring Indian-British newsagent of Radcliffe.
- Alistair Green as various
- Michael Spicer as various
- Yuriko Kotani as various (Series 3 onwards) - mainly Japanese-British characters.
- Tom Basden as Jason, Mandy’s Benefits Officer - a worker at Radcliffe's JobCentralPlus, a reference to the real-life Jobcentres across the country. He suffers through most of Mandy's employment disasters and frequently threatens to withdraw Mandy's benefits, which leads to several rows. In Season 4's premiere, he reveals he runs a restart program.

== Episodes ==
Series	Episodes	Originally released	
Series	Episodes	First released	Last released
Pilot	1	25 July 2019	25 July 2019
1	6	13 August 2020	27 August 2020
2	7	20 December 2021	19 January 2022
3	6	27 March 2024	10 April 2024
4	6	21 July 2025	4 August 2025

=== Pilot (2019) ===
No. overall	Title	Directed by	Written by	Original release date	U.K. viewers (millions)
1	"Pilot"	Diane Morgan	Diane Morgan	25 July 2019	N/A
Mandy discovers the sofa of her dreams, but it's way out of her price range, so she turns to a succession of get rich quick schemes to fund it. Guest stars: Gbemisola Ikumelo (Shola), Carol Decker (herself), Rick Edwards (himself)

=== Series 1 (2020) ===
No. overall	No. in series	Title	Directed by	Written by	Original release date	U.K. viewers (millions)
2	1	"Jobseeker"	Diane Morgan	Diane Morgan	13 August 2020	1.59
Mandy's employment adviser finds her a job in a banana processing factory. It seems simple enough, but chaos soon follows.
3	2	"Susan Bloody Blower"	Diane Morgan	Diane Morgan	13 August 2020	1.38
Mandy is determined to win a line dancing endurance challenge, but unfortunately her former friend turned adversary, Susan Blower, has the same idea. Mandy and Lola turn to voodoo in an attempt to stop her. Guest star: Maxine Peake (Susan Blower)
4	3	"Russian"	Diane Morgan	Diane Morgan	20 August 2020	N/A
When Mandy advertises her spare room on Airbnb, she finds herself playing host to a taciturn Russian man. Romance ensues, but it's not without its problems: he's an assassin being hunted by MI6, and she's still married to Shaun Ryder. Guest stars: Tony Way (Sergei), Shaun Ryder (himself).
5	4	"Fish"	Diane Morgan	Diane Morgan	20 August 2020	N/A
Mandy meets Geoff while posing naked as a sushi platter in a Japanese restaurant. Mandy invites Geoff to Lola's for a fish pedicure, but Geoff's toe is bitten off when Mandy places piranhas in the tub. Later on a date, Mandy is forced to empty a wine bottle into Geoff's aquarium and urinate in the empty bottle when there is no bathroom available. Geoff kicks Mandy out when he discovers she had killed all his pet fish. Guest star: Sean Lock (Geoff). This was Lock's last performance before his death in August 2021.
6	5	"Meat"	Diane Morgan	Diane Morgan	27 August 2020	N/A
Mandy's doctor advises her to eat healthily, stop smoking, and exercise. Mandy makes vegetable smoothies (with meat in it), takes anti-smoking pills (that causes blackouts and violent mood swings), and walks dogs (for exercise). On her first excursion, she faints and the dog runs away. Mandy awakens from her blackout covered in bloody flesh—not realising it is from the meat she was carrying for her smoothies—and tearfully tells the owner she ate his dog. Guest stars: David Bradley (Frank), Jackie Clune (Nurse)
7	6	"Broadsword to Donna Ball"	Diane Morgan	Diane Morgan	27 August 2020	N/A
An old associate ropes in Mandy to act as lookout for a robbery, but when Mandy falls asleep on the job, she ends up being buried alive. Guest stars: Natalie Cassidy (Donna Ball), Iain Lee (himself)

=== Series 2 (2021–2022) ===
No. overall	No. in series	Title	Directed by	Written by	Original release date	U.K. viewers (millions)
Christmas Special
8	1	"We Wish You a Mandy Christmas"	Diane Morgan	Diane Morgan	20 December 2021	N/A
Mandy contemplates the true meaning of Christmas, and whether anyone actually likes eating turkey. Guest stars: Jo Hartley (Mandy's Mum), Neil Edmond (Mandy's Dad), Johnny Vegas (Ghost of Christmas Past), Pearce Quigley (Ghost of Christmas Present) and John Cooper Clarke (Ghost of Christmas Yet To Come).
Series
9	2	"The Unpleasantness at Brampton Hall"	Diane Morgan	Diane Morgan	5 January 2022	1.65
Unpleasantness comes in many different forms, but the unpleasantness at Brampton Hall, a stately home and Mandy's latest workplace, is like none other. Guest stars: Jackie Clune (Mrs. Anderson)
10	3	"Who Are You, Do You Think?"	Diane Morgan	Diane Morgan	5 January 2022	N/A
Mandy's job as a cleaner leads to an unexpected role in an episode of a new TV show, Who Are You, Do You Think?. Guest stars: Deborah Meaden (herself), Charlie Chuck (Uncle Charlie)
11	4	"Holiday for One"	Diane Morgan	Diane Morgan	12 January 2022	N/A
Lola wins a holiday on a fancy cruise across the sea, but it's only for one. But that won't stop Mandy from having a holiday too. Guest stars: Kate Robbins (Joan MacDonald), Nigel Planer (Captain), Roger Sloman (The Purser)
12	5	"SpaceMandy"	Diane Morgan	Diane Morgan	12 January 2022	N/A
Mandy finds herself the face of the next frontier of space exploration: a one-way journey to Mars. Guest stars: Peter McDonald (Dr. Gould), Anna Maxwell Martin (Eva), Konnie Huq (herself)
13	6	"Fatberg"	Diane Morgan	Diane Morgan	19 January 2022	N/A
A cushy job down the sewers yields some unexpected training and an extraordinary first day for Mandy. Guest stars: Alexei Sayle (Darren Dugdale), Tom Courtenay (Engineer Woodcock)
14	7	"The Curse of Mandy Carter"	Diane Morgan	Diane Morgan	19 January 2022	N/A
Believing she's been cursed by a traveller, and is being hunted by a leather-clad man on a motorbike, Mandy prepares for a frozen future. Guest stars: Jo Hartley (Heather seller), Neil Edmond (Reporter), Nick Mohammed (Future Doctor), Brian Cox (himself)

=== Series 3 (2024) ===
No. overall	No. in series	Title	Directed by	Written by	Original release date	U.K. viewers (millions)
15	1	"Destination: Dundee"	Diane Morgan	Diane Morgan	27 March 2024	N/A
Some surgical modifications enable Mandy to work as an air hostess, where airborne scratchcards turn out to be the least of her worries. Guest stars: Nathan Foad (Kenny), Lucia Keskin (Shona) and Paul Ready (Cooper)
16	2	"Get Mandy Carter"	Diane Morgan	Diane Morgan	27 March 2024	N/A
A job protecting a very old tree from climbing children takes Mandy's career in an unexpectedly violent direction. Guest stars: Miles Chapman (Mr Taupe), Robbie Gee (Mr Beige) and Graham Norton (himself)
17	3	"Humandy Statue"	Diane Morgan	Diane Morgan	3 April 2024	N/A
Can Psychic Pauline help Mandy to lay the (snooker-playing) ghosts of her past to rest? Guest stars: Beverley Callard (Psychic Pauline), Jackie Clune (Assistant) and Seán Burke (Alex "Hurricane" Higgins)
18	4	"The Career Ladder"	Diane Morgan	Diane Morgan	3 April 2024	N/A
Mandy's odd jobs fixing the roof of the local church lead her into direct conflict with the local bird life. Guest stars: Ben Green (Vicar), Michaela Strachan (herself), Aled Jones (himself)
19	5	"Nandy"	Diane Morgan	Diane Morgan	10 April 2024	N/A
Mandy's 110-year-old relative buys a baby on the dark web, with life-threatening consequences.
20	6	"The Ballad of Mandy Carter"	Diane Morgan	Diane Morgan	10 April 2024	N/A
After some near-misses at a biscuit factory and an abattoir, Mandy decides the only way to enhance her career prospects is to improve her social status. Guest stars: Linda Lusardi (herself) and Alan Yentob (himself)

=== Series 4 (2025–2026) ===
No. overall	No. in series	Title	Directed by	Written by	Original release date	U.K. viewers (millions)
21	1	"Petty Woman"	Diane Morgan	Diane Morgan and Ben Caudell	21 July 2025	N/A
Mandy is forced by the job centre to attend a restart scheme, helps out at Lola’s injecting Botox and tries to dress for success from a posh boutique. Guest stars: Martin Lewis (himself) and Sian Gibson (Janice)
22	2	"Mad Mandy: Fury Road"	Diane Morgan	Diane Morgan and Ben Caudell	21 July 2025	N/A
Mandy accuses her job centre adviser of sexual harassment. She has to get her driving licence to get a job in an ice cream van.
23	3	"Wormhole"	Diane Morgan	Diane Morgan and Ben Caudell	28 July 2025	N/A
Mandy is fired from her job at a call centre for abusing the customers and steals a computer. She becomes obsessed with the internet and gets cheap plastic surgery at a kebab shop.
24	4	"Mandy on the Run"	Diane Morgan	Diane Morgan and Ben Caudell	28 July 2025	N/A
Mandy gets a job at a chip shop and helps out a friend with his cannabis plants ending up in trouble with the law for a drugs charge and GBH. Guest stars: Robbie Gee (DCI Lambert) and Lucia Keskin (Chip Shop Customer)
25	5	"Seed"	Diane Morgan	Diane Morgan and Ben Caudell	4 August 2025	N/A
Mandy makes friends with a rat in her house and then finds herself in a “speed” type situation on a local bus. Guest stars: Polly Kemp (Cathy)
26	6	"It's Not You, It's Mandy"	Diane Morgan	Diane Morgan and Ben Caudell	4 August 2025	N/A
Mandy visits a dating agency and after a couple of disastrous dates matches with her ideal man - Paddy McGuiness. Guest stars: Paddy McGuinness (himself), Rosie Cavaliero (June) and Ben Rufus Green (Waiter)
Christmas Special
27	7	"The Mandy Who Knew Too Much"	Diane Morgan	Diane Morgan	2026	TBD
