= Bliss (2018 TV series) =

British comedy-drama television series

- Genre: Comedy-drama
- Created by: David Cross
- Starring: Stephen Mangan; Heather Graham; Jo Hartley
- Country of origin: United Kingdom
- Original language: English
- No. of series: 1
- No. of episodes: 7

Production
- Production companies: Liberal Jew-Run Media Productions; Merman; Big Talk Productions

Original release
- Network: Sky One
- Release: 14 February – 28 March 2018

Bliss is a six-episode British comedy-drama television series set in Bristol. It was created by David Cross and broadcast by Sky One from 14 February to 28 March 2018. It stars Stephen Mangan as Andrew, a fraudulent travel writer, who is struggling to maintain long-term relationships with two partners, Kim (Heather Graham) and their teenage daughter (Hannah Millward), and Denise (Jo Hartley) and their teenage son (Spike White), who are not aware of one another.

== Cast and characters ==
- Stephen Mangan as Andrew
- Heather Graham as Kim
- Jo Hartley as Denise
- Spike White as Kris
- Hannah Millward as Christina
- Oscar Kennedy as Kristaps
