= Martin Trenaman =

English comedian and actor (born 1962)

Martin Trenaman (born 10 October 1961) is an English actor, comedy writer and performer. He is best known for playing Alan Cooper, the father of Simon Cooper, in the Channel 4 sitcom The Inbetweeners and its two feature films. He is also known for playing Lance, the manager of the Sutton branch of PhoneShop, and for his work as a comedy writer and additional-material contributor on a variety of British television programmes.

== Career ==
Trenaman won So You Think You're Funny? in 1994 and went on to write additional material for shows such as Head on Comedy, Lenny Henry in Pieces and Haywire, and for comedians such as Harry Enfield, Johnny Vaughan and Phil Kay. The Lenny Henry special which he contributed to was winner of the Golden Rose of Montreaux in 2001.

Trenaman has been credited with writing material for Is It Bill Bailey? and Never Mind the Buzzcocks. He appeared in two of Bailey's live shows; with Phil Whelans in Bill Bailey's Cosmic Jam (1996) as part of the band "The Stan Ellis Experiment", and in Part Troll (2004) with Kevin Eldon and John Moloney in Kraftwerk spoof, "Das Hokey Kokey". He also appears on Bailey's Bewilderness DVD in the spoof interview Legacy of Dreams: With Martin Trenaman. Along with Bill Bailey, Phil Whelans, and Kevin Eldon, he is a member of the punk rock cover band Beergut 100. He also appeared in Spaced, playing the nemesis of Bailey's character and owner of a rival comic book shop, and in Eldon's sketch comedy It's Kevin along with Bailey.

He worked with Sean Lock, both in writing additional material for Is it Bill Bailey? and Never Mind the Buzzcocks, and also by co-writing Sean Lock's sitcom 15 Storeys High. Trenaman has contributed to all 4 series of the show, which includes 2 on radio and 2 on television. He also co-stars in the first series of the radio show, and makes numerous guest appearances during the television series.

In 2004 Trenaman appeared as a locksmith in the first series of The Mighty Boosh. He played the role of Lance, the manager, in E4's Phoneshop. He appeared in CBBC's All at Sea, and in Noel Fielding's Luxury Comedy.

Recently, Trenaman has written for the Channel 4 comedy panel show 8 Out of 10 Cats Does Countdown and for the BBC children's comedy Horrible Histories. He also played Ken in Series 4 of the award-winning British comedy So Awkward.

In 2019, Trenaman appeared in the Acorn TV series Queens of Mystery as Derek Thorne.

In 2020, he appeared as DS Ferguson in ITV Drama Quiz, based on the real life incident in 2001 when Major Charles Ingram attempted to cheat his way to a million pounds on quiz show Who Wants to Be a Millionaire?

In 2024, Trenaman appeared in BBC Eastenders London Marathon episode as PC Green.

== Personal life ==
Trenaman is a supporter of Southend United.
