= Michael Spicer (comedian) =

British comedy writer and performer (born 1977)

- Occupations: Comedian; writer; actor; director

YouTube information
- Channel: Michael Spicer
- Genre: Comedy
- Subscribers: 224 thousand
- Views: 45.5 million
- Last updated: August 2026

Michael Spicer (born 1977) is a British comedy writer and performer. He produces a satirical video series The Room Next Door.

== Career ==
Spicer began writing comedy as a teenager. In a 2026 interview with The Guardian, he said that he had submitted sketches to Spitting Image when he was 17 and had made his own comedy sketches before the widespread use of the internet. He continued writing comedy throughout his twenties and thirties, pitching material to television commissioners, while also working as a copywriter for a shipping company.

Spicer's breakthrough came in June 2019 after he watched an interview with Boris Johnson during the 2019 Conservative Party leadership election. Johnson's pauses during the interview led Spicer to imagine an adviser attempting to guide him through an earpiece. Spicer filmed a sketch based on the idea that evening and uploaded it to social media. He subsequently developed the concept into the satirical video series The Room Next Door, in which he plays a frustrated adviser communicating via an earpiece with a public figure, with the videos cutting between Spicer and footage of the person speaking in public. Figures featured in the series have included Prince Andrew, Boris Johnson and Donald Trump. By September 2020, The Guardian reported that The Room Next Door had accumulated 50 million views across social media. Its success also led to Spicer appearing on The Late Late Show with James Corden, for which he recorded several sketches.

As an actor, Spicer has appeared in television programmes including The Mash Report, Mandy, After Life, Bridgerton, Sister Boniface Mysteries and Disclaimer. He has a longstanding creative association with Diane Morgan. In a 2025 interview with The Guardian, Morgan recalled that she and Spicer would meet in an empty room above a pub with a collection of wigs and improvise characters together, one of which developed into Mandy, the character Morgan later portrayed in the BBC comedy series of the same name. Spicer later appeared in Mandy in multiple roles and produced its second series.

Spicer's radio sitcom Michael Spicer: Before Next Door was broadcast on BBC Radio 4, beginning with a pilot before running for two series. In 2024, BBC Radio 4 began broadcasting his sketch series Michael Spicer: No Room, in which Spicer performs a variety of characters.

In May 2026, British Comedy Guide reported that Spicer was developing a television comedy thriller based on The Room Next Door that originated as a project with filmmaker Alfonso Cuarón. Cuarón contacted Spicer during the COVID-19 pandemic, and the pair collaborated on a script for approximately two years as part of Cuarón's television deal with Apple TV+. After Apple declined to commission the series, Cuarón transferred his rights in the project to Spicer, who rewrote it and continued its development elsewhere. As of May 2026, the project remained in development.

In August 2026, Spicer performed his satirical show Hope All's Well at the Edinburgh Festival Fringe, appearing at Assembly George Square Studios from 5 to 16 August. The show featured sketches and stories as well as characters from his BBC Radio 4 series Michael Spicer: No Room. A UK tour of Hope All's Well was scheduled to run from 5 September to 21 November 2026. Reviewing the show for Chortle, Steve Bennett described it as an "old-fashioned variety show" combining video sketches with social and political satire, and praised Spicer's observations as thoughtful and witty.

== Awards ==
Spicer won the internet category at the 2020 Chortle Awards and the 2020 Comedy.co.uk Award for Best Radio Sitcom, for the pilot of his BBC Radio 4 comedy Michael Spicer: Before Next Door. The first series of Michael Spicer: Before Next Door subsequently won the 2021 Comedy.co.uk Award for Best Radio Sitcom.

== Filmography ==
Year	Title	Role	Notes
2008	Martina Cole's Lady Killers	Fred West	Episode: "Rose West"
2019 to present	Mandy	Various roles	13 episodes
2021	Buffering	Ryan	Episode: "Screen Test"
2022	After Life	Ben	Episode: "Episode #3.5"
2022	Bridgerton	Society Papa	Episode: "The Viscount Who Loved Me"
2024	Avoidance	Doctor	Episode: "Episode #2.6"
2024	Disclaimer	Simon	3 episodes
2024	Sister Boniface Mysteries	Donald Merriweather	Episode: "How to Murder a Tune"
2025	My Mother's Wedding	Ted Schenlker	Feature film
2025	Fan Art	The Fan	Short film
2025	Closedown	A man	Short film, screenwriter, director, principal cast member

== Radio programmes and podcasts ==
Year	Title	Role	Notes
2020-2023	Michael Spicer: Before Next Door	Himself, Various.	9 episodes (Two series of four episodes and 1 pilot).
2021	Michael Spicer’s It Happened to Me	Himself, Various.	Fake interview show, plays the interviewee and a fictionalised version of himself as a producer. The podcast has 6 episodes.
2024-2025	Michael Spicer: No Room	Various	Radio sketch show, with two series and a total of 21 episodes.

== Attitude to hecklers and internet "trolling" ==
Spicer noted in an interview with the Guardian that, doing most of his comedy online, he had "never been heckled", and he never read the comments below the videos.

When asked about the "best piece of trolling" he had ever experienced, Spicer noted that he finds 'trolls' "abhorrent" and "motivated by toxicity" and by "poisonous behaviour"; and that "internet commenting has really contributed nothing to society or culture".

== Publications ==
- The Secret Political Adviser: The Unredacted Files of the Man in the Room Next Door. Canongate, 2020. ISBN 978-1-83885-314-3
