= Alone (radio series) =

BBC Radio 4 situation comedy

- Genre: Situation comedy
- Running time: 30 minutes
- Country of origin: United Kingdom
- Language: English
- Home station: BBC Radio 4
- Starring: Angus Deayton; Pearce Quigley; Abigail Cruttenden; Kate Isitt; Bennett Arron
- Written by: Moray Hunter
- Produced by: Gordon Kennedy
- Original release: 7 January 2017
- No. of series: 4
- No. of episodes: 25 (including pilot)
- Audio format: Stereophonic sound
- Website: Alone at BBC Radio 4

Alone is a BBC Radio 4 situation comedy which stars Angus Deayton and is written by Moray Hunter. The show began with a pilot episode in January 2017, with the first series following on 26 April 2018. A third series began on 7 April 2021 followed by a fourth in August 2022.

The song used throughout episodes is "Some of Us" by Starsailor.

== Cast ==
- Angus Deayton as Mitch
- Pearce Quigley as Will
- Abigail Cruttenden as Ellie
- Kate Isitt as Louisa
- Bennett Arron as Morris

== Plot ==
Middle-aged and widowed Mitch is living in a converted North London Victorian house, divided into flats, with the house owner and half-brother Will who works as a translator from home. In the neighbouring flats is nervous and shy teacher Ellie who secretly has a crush on Mitch, frightfully honest but frustrated actress Louisa, and dimwitted IT nerd Morris. All four find their way to bothering Mitch with regularity.

== Episodes ==
=== Pilot ===
No.	Title	Original release date
1	"The Only Way Is Ethics"	7 January 2017

=== Series one ===
No. overall	No. in series	Title	Original release date
2	1	"The Long Bad Friday Night"	26 April 2018
3	2	"Not Listening But Hearing"	3 May 2018
4	3	"Just Say No"	10 May 2018
5	4	"The Reunion"	17 May 2018
6	5	"The Big Match"	24 May 2018
7	6	"Birthday Drinks"	31 May 2018

=== Series two ===
No. overall	No. in series	Title	Original release date
8	1	"A Cry For No Help"	10 October 2019
9	2	"Anti-Valentine's Day"	17 October 2019
10	3	"A Few Loose Ends"	24 October 2019
11	4	"Front Window"	7 October 2019
12	5	"The Big Scene"	14 November 2019
13	6	"Friday Nights, Saturday Mornings"	21 November 2019

=== Series three ===
No. overall	No. in series	Title	Original release date
14	1	"Remember The Date"	7 April 2021
15	2	"Unpacking The Yada Yada"	17 April 2021
16	3	"Undercover Hamster"	21 April 2021
17	4	"Man Down"	28 April 2021
18	5	"One's Company"	5 May 2021
19	6	"Best Man Wins"	12 May 2021

=== Series four ===
No. overall	No. in series	Title	Original release date
20	1	"Best Upstairs Neighbour Ever"	16 August 2022
21	2	"The Longest Brief Thing"	23 August 2022
22	3	"Cat and Mice"	30 August 2022
23	4	"Ellie Retirement"	6 September 2022
24	5	"The Toy Man"	13 September 2022
25	6	"Domestic Blitz"	20 September 2022

== Development ==
The show pilot was commissioned as part of a group of six shows which aired together on 7 January 2017.

The first series was confirmed on 17 August 2017. The return for the second series was announced on 9 January 2018.

== Broadcast history ==
The show originally aired on BBC Radio 4, with repeats also airing the following week on BBC Radio 4 Extra.
