= Swede Caroline =

- Directed by: Finn Bruce; Brook Driver
- Starring: Jo Hartley; Aisling Bea; Ray Fearon
- Release date: 2024
- Running time: 97 minutes
- Country: United Kingdom
- Language: English

Swede Caroline is a 2024 British mockumentary film directed by Finn Bruce and Brook Driver.
