= My Funniest Year =

- Genre: Comedy
- Country of origin: United Kingdom
- Original language: English
- No. of series: 1
- No. of episodes: 4

Production
- Running time: 125 minutes (2010); 120 minutes (2011)

Original release
- Network: Channel 4
- Release: 4 September 2010 – 7 October 2011

My Funniest Year is a British television stand-up comedy series broadcast on Channel 4. Each episode is based on a comedian talking about the events of one particular year during his life.

== Episode list ==
No.	Presenter	Directed by	Year discussed	Original release date
1	Rufus Hound	Paul Wheeler	2000	4 September 2010
2	Jack Whitehall	Geraldine Dowd	2005	23 September 2011
3	Al Murray	Paul Wheeler	1997	30 September 2011
4	Chris Addison	Paul Wheeler	2001	7 October 2011
