= Live at the Electric =

British comedy television series

- Genre: Comedy
- Presented by: Russell Kane
- Country of origin: United Kingdom
- No. of series: 3
- No. of episodes: 24

Production
- Production locations: BBC Television Centre (2012–13); BBC Elstree Centre (2014)
- Running time: 30 minutes
- Production company: Avalon Television

Original release
- Network: BBC Three
- Release: 31 May 2012 – 28 February 2014

Live at the Electric is a British comedy series that aired on BBC Three between 31 May 2012 and 28 February 2014 and was hosted by Russell Kane who performed stand-up in between comedy sketches from a variety of performers such as Joe Wilkinson and Diane Morgan's double act Two Episodes of Mash. It also featured comedy duo Totally Tom serving as backstage crew for the show.
