= After Life (TV series) =

2019–2022 British streaming TV series

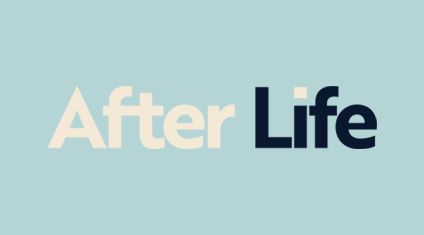
- Genre: Black comedy; Tragicomedy; Comedy drama
- Created by: Ricky Gervais
- Written by: Ricky Gervais
- Directed by: Ricky Gervais
- Starring: Ricky Gervais; Diane Morgan; Tom Basden; Tony Way; Mandeep Dhillon; Ashley Jensen; David Bradley; Kerry Godliman; Penelope Wilton; David Earl; Joe Wilkinson; Jo Hartley; Roisin Conaty; Tim Plester; Paul Kaye
- Composer: Andy Burrows
- Country of origin: United Kingdom
- Original language: English
- No. of series: 3
- No. of episodes: 18

Production
- Executive producer: Ricky Gervais
- Producer: Duncan Hayes
- Cinematography: Martin Hawkins
- Editors: Jo Walker (series 1–2); Mark Williams (series 3)
- Camera setup: Single-camera
- Running time: 25–31 minutes
- Production company: Derek Productions Limited

Original release
- Network: Netflix
- Release: 8 March 2019 – 14 January 2022

After Life is a British comedy drama television series created, written, executive produced, and directed by Ricky Gervais, who plays lead character Tony Johnson. It premiered on 8 March 2019 on Netflix. The second series premiered on 24 April 2020. The third and final series premiered on 14 January 2022.

== Premise ==
Set in the fictional town of Tambury, After Life follows local newspaper reporter Tony Johnson, whose life is turned upside down after his wife dies from breast cancer. He contemplates suicide, but instead decides to spend his life punishing the world for his wife's death by saying and doing whatever he wants regardless of how it makes other people feel. Although he thinks of this as his "superpower", his plan is undermined as he realises he does care about a select few people. Over the course of the series, he stops trying to be awful and, despite never really moving on from his wife's death and remaining suicidal, decides true meaning in life comes from helping and being there for others.

== Cast and characters ==
=== Main ===
- Ricky Gervais as Tony Johnson, head of feature stories at the local newspaper, the Tambury Gazette. Following the death of his wife, he is depressed and suicidal.
- Tom Basden as Matt Braden, Tony's brother-in-law and boss of the Tambury Gazette
- Tony Way as Lenny, the Tambury Gazette's photographer
- Diane Morgan as Kath, the Gazette's advert manager
- Mandeep Dhillon as Sandy, a newly hired features journalist (series 1–2)
- Kerry Godliman as Lisa Johnson, Tony's deceased wife, seen in flashbacks and Tony's home videos
- Ashley Jensen as Emma, a nurse at the nursing home where Tony's father is a resident
- Paul Kaye as Tony's and Matt's unconventional and incompetent counsellor (series 1–2)
- Penelope Wilton as Anne, a widow Tony meets at the local graveyard who dispenses sage advice for Tony's troubles
- Joe Wilkinson as Pat, Tony's postman
- Roisin Conaty as Daphne/"Roxy", a sex worker who befriends Tony (series 1–2)
- David Bradley as Ray Johnson, Tony's father, who has dementia (series 1–2; guest series 3)
- Tim Plester as Julian Kane, a drug addict hired by Matt to deliver the Tambury Gazette (series 1)
- David Earl as Brian Gittins, a hoarder and self-professed puppeteer and stand-up comedian who wants to appear in the local newspaper (series 2–3; recurring series 1)
- Jo Hartley as June, Lenny's partner and mother to James (series 2–3; recurring series 1)
- Ethan Lawrence as James, June's son, who does work experience at the Tambury Gazette (series 2–3; recurring series 1)
- Colin Hoult as Ken Otley, head of the local amateur dramatics company and would be showbiz superstar (series 3; recurring series 2)
- Kath Hughes as Coleen, Sandy's replacement at the Gazette (series 3; guest series 1)

=== Recurring ===
- Anti as Brandy the Dog, Tony's and Lisa's dog
- Michelle Greenidge as Valerie, the Tambury Gazette's receptionist
- Tommy Finnegan as George Braden, son of Matt and Jill, Tony's nephew and godchild
- Thomas Bastable as Robbie, a classmate and reformed bully of George
- Laura Patch as Jill Braden, Matt's wife (series 2–3; guest series 1)
- Tracy-Ann Oberman as Rebecca, a woman with whom Tony goes on a date and who later reappears at an amateur dramatics workshop (series 2; guest series 1, 3)
- Peter Egan as Paul, the semi-retired owner of the Tambury Gazette (series 2–3)
- Robert Woodhall as Colin, a self-made millionaire scrap metal merchant whom Kath allows to drive her around in his Rolls-Royce (series 2–3)
- Bill Ward as Simon, Emma's new love interest, whom Tony dislikes (series 2)
- Steve Brody as Jeff, a crematorium official (series 1) and swinger husband of Vera (series 3)

=== Guest ===
- Annette Crosbie as Rosemary, a 100-year-old woman whom Tony interviews after she receives a telegram from the Queen (series 2)
- Holli Dempsey as a woman addicted to plastic surgery (series 2)
- Jo Enright as Vera, a woman who goes swinging with her husband (series 3)
- Kate Robbins as Penny (series 3)
- Cole Anderson-James as a yoga instructor (series 3)
- Steve Speirs as a man who has been posting his letters in a dog waste bin for the last year. (series 2)

== Episodes ==
| Series | Episodes | Originally released |
|---|---|---|
| 1 | 6 | 8 March 2019 |
| 2 | 6 | 24 April 2020 |
| 3 | 6 | 14 January 2022 |

== Production ==
=== Development ===
On 9 May 2018, it was announced Netflix had given the production a series order for a first series consisting of six episodes. The series was created and directed by Ricky Gervais, who is also executive producer, alongside Charlie Hanson. On 14 January 2019, it was announced the series would premiere on 8 March 2019. It was further announced Duncan Hayes would serve as an additional executive producer and that Hanson would actually serve as a producer. On 3 April 2019, it was announced the series was renewed for a second series, which premiered on 24 April 2020. On 6 May 2020, the show was renewed for a third series, the first time a fiction series created by Gervais had (excluding special episodes) been extended beyond two series.

Hanson was suspended from his position in the show during filming for the third series, due to eleven women saying he had committed sexual misconduct and assault against them between 2008 and 2015. Netflix said: "Whilst the allegations are unrelated to his time on the show, we immediately removed him from the production and referred the matter to the police." Gervais commented he was "shocked and appalled" to learn of the allegations, and Hanson claimed they were "demonstrably false" from the information given to him.

=== Casting ===
Alongside the series order announcement, it was confirmed Gervais would star in the show. On 5 July 2018, it was announced Penelope Wilton, David Bradley, Ashley Jensen, Tom Basden, Tony Way, David Earl, Joe Wilkinson, Kerry Godliman, Mandeep Dhillon, Jo Hartley, Roisin Conaty, and Diane Morgan had joined the cast.

=== Filming ===
Principal photography for the first series reportedly began by July 2018 in London. The series was filmed in Hampstead, Hemel Hempstead, The Royal Standard of England pub in and around Beaconsfield, and Camber Sands in East Sussex.

Filming for the second series began in September 2019 and wrapped in January 2020. The third series of After Life began production in April 2021 and wrapped in June 2021.

=== Use of Aboriginal painting ===
After the release of series 1, it was revealed that a copy of a 1987 painting by the Aboriginal Australian artist Warlimpirrnga Tjapaltjarri, which had been made by an artist commissioned to do so for a props company in 1999, had been prominently displayed in several scenes. Gervais's company agreed to pay compensation for using the copy of the work, entitled Tingarri Dreaming, as well as a fee for ongoing use of the work in series 2.

== Reception ==
=== Critical response ===
Critical response of After Life
| Season | Rotten Tomatoes | Metacritic |
|---|---|---|
| 1 | 73% (45 reviews) | 59 (15 reviews) |
| 2 | 77% (31 reviews) | 62 (6 reviews) |
| 3 | 62% (13 reviews) | 44 (7 reviews) |

==== Series 1 ====
The first series received mixed to positive reviews upon its release. On Rotten Tomatoes, it has an overall approval rating of 73% with an average score of 6.6/10 based on 45 reviews. The site's critical consensus reads: "After Life's first season teeters tonally between dark comedy and affecting drama, but Ricky Gervais' poignant performance illuminates new sides of the actor's talent". Metacritic, which uses a weighted average, assigned the first series a score of 59 out of 100 based on 15 critics, indicating "mixed or average reviews".

Merrill Barr from Forbes said of the series, "Overall, After Life is one hundred percent a series to check out. It's the Ricky Gervais project people have been begging for, for a long time." Josh Modell of AV Club states that After Life is a "dreary, sarcastic self-pity party that also manages—in a magic trick perhaps only Gervais is capable of pulling off—to constantly point out its protagonist's intellectual superiority" and that "as a meaningful meditation on grief, is dead on arrival".

==== Series 2 ====
The second series received generally positive reviews from critics. On Rotten Tomatoes, it has an approval rating of 77% with an average score of 6.8/10, based on 31 reviews. The site's critical consensus reads: "Though After Life's second season struggles to affirm its existence, it's a solid entry for anyone aching for a little more contemplative gallows humor." Metacritic assigned the second series a score of 62 out of 100 based on six critics, indicating "generally favourable reviews". The BBC reported mixed responses from critics. Ed Cumming from The Independent wrote: "all I see is a series constantly looking for easy solutions" and that "the script has a habit of using swearing where a joke ought to be".

==== Series 3 ====
The third series received mixed reviews. On Rotten Tomatoes, it has 62% positive reviews with an average rating of 6 from 13 critics. Metacritic assigned the third series a score of 44 out of 100 based on 7 critics, indicating "mixed or average reviews". Louis Chilton for The Independent gave the series 2/5 stars, adding that it was "bogged down by sentimentality". Brian Lowry for CNN called the series "admirable" and "quirky", but felt "in the final analysis, the show never wholly [advances] beyond the initial appeal of its premise". The Radio Times gave it 3/5 stars and NME gave it a 4/5 star rating, adding that the series had ended "on a high"; the review's writer, James McMahon, felt that the series' final scene was "moving and poignant [...] among its creator's greatest works."

=== Accolades ===
Accolades received by After Life
| Award | Date of ceremony | Category | Recipient(s) | Result | Ref. |
|---|---|---|---|---|---|
| AACTA International Awards | 8 December 2021 | International Award for Best Comedy Series | After Life | Nominated | |
| National Film Awards UK | 1 July 2021 | Best Screenplay in a TV Series | After Life | Won | |
| National Film Awards UK | 1 July 2021 | Best Actor in a TV Series | Ricky Gervais | Nominated | |
| National Film Awards UK | 1 July 2021 | Best Actress in a TV Series | Mandeep Dhillon | Nominated | |
| National Television Awards | 9 September 2021 | Best Comedy | After Life | Won | |
| Satellite Awards | 15 February 2021 | Best Actor – Television Series Musical or Comedy | Ricky Gervais | Nominated | |
| National Television Awards | 13 October 2022 | Best Comedy | After Life | Won | |

== Benches ==
Netflix has collaborated with suicide prevention charity Campaign Against Living Miserably (CALM) in a mental health initiative installing park benches all about the UK.

A bench is the setting across all three series where Anne, played by Penelope Wilton, sits beside Gervais's character, Tony.

Ricky Gervais is originally from Reading, where a bench has been installed at Henley Road Cemetery.

We hope the benches will create a lasting legacy for After Life, as well as become a place for people to visit.

— Ricky Gervais, January 2022 interview

| Site | Location |
|---|---|
| Victoria Park | Ashford |
| Sydney Gardens | Bath |
| Cofton Park | Birmingham |
| Ashton Court | Bristol |
| Parc Cefn Onn | Cardiff |
| Victoria Park | Cardiff |
| Calton Hill | Edinburgh |
| Gyllngdune Gardens | Falmouth |
| Glasgow Green | Glasgow |
| Stanley Park | Liverpool |
| Woolton Walled Gardens | Liverpool |
| Highgate Wood | London |
| Parliament Hill | London |
| Queens Park | London |
| Ravenscourt Park | London |
| Rookery Gardens & Woodland | London |
| York House Gardens | London |
| Wythenshawe Park | Manchester |
| Blenheim Gardens | Minehead |
| Exhibition Park | Newcastle |
| Aboretum | Nottingham |
| Highfields Park | Nottingham |
| Henley Road Cemetery | Reading |
| Lightwater Country Park | Surrey Heath |
| Vivary Park | Taunton |
