= Best Actor =

Best Actor is the name of an award which is presented by various film, television and theatre organizations, festivals, and people's awards to leading actors in a film, television series, television film or play.

The term most often refers to the Academy Award for Best Actor, which was first awarded on May 16, 1929, by the Academy of Motion Picture Arts and Sciences (AMPAS) at the Academy Awards to Emil Jannings for his role of Grand Duke Sergius Alexander in The Last Command and August Schilling in The Way of All Flesh. In theatre, it was first awarded on April 6, 1947, by the American Theatre Wing and The Broadway League at the Tony Awards to José Ferrer for his role of Cyrano de Bergerac in Cyrano de Bergerac and to Fredric March for his role of Clinton Jones in Years Ago. In television, it was first awarded on January 23, 1951 by Academy of Television Arts & Sciences at the Primetime Emmy Awards to Alan Young for his role of himself in The Alan Young Show. In a film festival, presented as the Volpi Cup, it was first awarded between August 1 and 20, 1934, at the Venice Film Festival to Wallace Beery for his role of Pancho Villa in Viva Villa!

== Film awards ==
- AACTA Award for Best Actor in a Leading Role
- AACTA International Award for Best Actor
- AVN Award for Best Actor
- Academy Award for Best Actor
- Annecy Italian Film Festival for Best Actor Award
- Asian Film Award for Best Actor
- Asianet Film Award for Best Actor
- BAFTA Award for Best Actor in a Leading Role
- Babisas Award for Best Actor
- Bachsas Award for Best Actor
- Bangladesh National Film Award for Best Actor
- Bavarian Film Awards (Best Acting)
- Bengal Film Journalists' Association – Best Actor Award
- BET Award for Best Actor & Actress
- BIFA for Best Performance by an Actor in a British Independent Film
- Black Reel Award for Best Actor
- Bodil Award for Best Actor in a Leading Role
- Bollywood Movie Award – Best Actor
- Boston Society of Film Critics Award for Best Actor
- CIFF Best Actor Award
- Canadian Screen Award for Best Actor
- Cannes Film Festival Best Actor Award
- César Award for Best Actor
- Chicago Film Critics Association Award for Best Actor
- CineMAA Awards for Best Actor
- Citra Award for Best Actor
- CJFB Performance Award for Best Actor
- Critics' Choice Movie Award for Best Actor
- Critics' Choice Movie Award for Best Actor in an Action Movie
- Critics' Choice Movie Award for Best Actor in a Comedy
- Dallas–Fort Worth Film Critics Association Award for Best Actor
- David di Donatello for Best Actor
- Edda Award for Best Actor or Actress
- Empire Award for Best Actor
- Empire Award for Best British Actor
- European Film Award for Best Actor
- FAMAS Award for Best Actor
- Filmfare Award for Best Actor - Hindi
- Filmfare Award for Best Actor – Kannada
- Filmfare Award for Best Actor – Malayalam
- Filmfare Award for Best Actor – Tamil
- Filmfare Award for Best Actor – Telugu
- Florida Film Critics Circle Award for Best Actor
- Genie Award for Best Performance by a Foreign Actor
- GIFA Best Actor Award
- GIFA Critics Best Actor Award
- Golden Arena for Best Actor (Pula Film Festival)
- Golden Calf for Best Actor (Netherlands Film Festival)
- Golden Eagle Award for Best Actor (China)
- Golden Eagle Award for Best Actor (Russia)
- Golden Globe Award for Best Actor – Motion Picture Drama
- Golden Globe Award for Best Actor – Motion Picture Musical or Comedy
- Golden Goblet Award for Best Actor (Shanghai International Film Festival)
- Golden Horse Award for Best Leading Actor
- Golden Rooster Award for Best Actor
- Goya Award for Best Actor
- Goya Award for Best New Actor
- Guldbagge Award for Best Actor in a Leading Role
- Hong Kong Film Award for Best Actor
- Hundred Flowers Award for Best Actor
- IIFA Award for Best Actor
- Independent Spirit Award for Best Male Lead
- ITFA Best Actor Award
- ITFA Best New Actor Award
- Japan Academy Prize for Outstanding Performance by an Actor in a Leading Role
- Kerala State Film Award for Best Actor
- London Film Critics' Circle Award for Actor of the Year
- Los Angeles Film Critics Association Award for Best Actor
- Lumière Award for Best Actor
- Lux Style Award for Best Film Actor
- Meril Prothom Alo Award for Best Actor
- Nandi Award for Best Actor
- Nastro d'Argento for Best Actor
- Nigar Award for Best Actor
- National Board of Review Award for Best Actor
- National Film Award for Best Actor
- National Society of Film Critics Award for Best Actor
- NAACP Image Award for Outstanding Actor in a Motion Picture
- New York Film Critics Circle Award for Best Actor
- Online Film Critics Society Award for Best Actor
- Polish Academy Award for Best Actor
- Robert Award for Best Actor in a Leading Role
- San Diego Film Critics Society Award for Best Actor
- San Francisco Film Critics Circle Award for Best Actor
- Santosham Best Actor Award
- Sarasaviya Best Actor Award
- Satellite Award for Best Actor – Motion Picture
- Saturn Award for Best Actor
- Screen Actors Guild Award for Outstanding Performance by a Male Actor in a Leading Role
- Screen Award for Best Actor
- Screen Award for Best Actor (Critics)
- Screen Award for Best Actor (Popular Choice)
- Shanghai Film Critics Award for Best Actor
- SIIMA Award for Best Actor (Telugu)
- Silver Bear for Best Actor (Berlin International Film Festival)
- Silver Hugo Award for Best Actor (Chicago International Film Festival)
- St. Louis Gateway Film Critics Association Award for Best Actor
- Stardust Award for Best Actor
- Stardust Award for Best Actor in a Comedy or Romance
- Stardust Award for Best Actor in a Drama
- Stardust Award for Best Actor in a Thriller or Action
- Tamil Nadu State Film Award for Best Actor
- Tokyo International Film Festival Best Actor Award
- Toronto Film Critics Association Award for Best Actor
- Vancouver Film Critics Circle Award for Best Actor
- Vancouver Film Critics Circle Award for Best Actor in a Canadian Film
- Vietnam Film Festival Best Actor Award
- Vijay Award for Best Actor
- Volpi Cup for Best Actor (Venice Film Festival)
- Washington D.C. Area Film Critics Association Award for Best Actor
- Zee Cine Award for Best Actor – Male
- Zee Cine Critics Award for Best Actor – Male

== Television awards ==
- AACTA Award for Best Lead Actor in a Television Drama
- Golden Bell Award for Best Actor in a Miniseries or Television Film
- Golden Bell Award for Best Actor
- Black Reel Award for Best Actor: T.V. Movie/Cable
- British Academy Television Award for Best Actor
- British Soap Award for Best Actor
- Critics' Choice Television Award for Best Actor in a Comedy Series
- Critics' Choice Television Award for Best Actor in a Drama Series
- Critics' Choice Television Award for Best Actor in a Movie/Miniseries
- Daytime Emmy Award for Outstanding Lead Actor in a Drama Series
- Gemini Award for Best Performance by an Actor in a Continuing Leading Dramatic Role
- Golden Calf for Best Acting in a Television Drama (Pula Film Festival)
- Golden Globe Award for Best Actor – Miniseries or Television Film
- Golden Globe Award for Best Actor – Television Series Drama
- Golden Globe Award for Best Actor – Television Series Musical or Comedy
- Hum Award for Best Actor
- Hum Award for Best Actor Popular
- Lux Style Award for Best TV Actor
- NAACP Image Award for Outstanding Actor in a Daytime Drama Series
- NAACP Image Award for Outstanding Actor in a Drama Series
- NAACP Image Award for Outstanding Actor in a Television Movie, Mini-Series or Dramatic Special
- Primetime Emmy Award for Outstanding Lead Actor in a Comedy Series
- Primetime Emmy Award for Outstanding Lead Actor in a Drama Series
- Primetime Emmy Award for Outstanding Lead Actor in a Miniseries or a Movie
- Satellite Award for Best Actor – Miniseries or Television Film
- Satellite Award for Best Actor – Television Series Drama
- Satellite Award for Best Actor – Television Series Musical or Comedy
- Saturn Award for Best Actor on Television
- Screen Actors Guild Award for Outstanding Performance by a Male Actor in a Comedy Series
- Screen Actors Guild Award for Outstanding Performance by a Male Actor in a Drama Series
- Screen Actors Guild Award for Outstanding Performance by a Male Actor in a Miniseries or Television Movie
- Sun Kudumbam Best Actor Award
- TVB Anniversary Award for Best Actor

== Theatre awards ==
- Standard Theatre Award for Best Actor
- Helpmann Award for Best Male Actor in a Musical
- Helpmann Award for Best Male Actor in a Play
- Helpmann Award for Best Male Performer in an Opera
- Laurence Olivier Award for Actor of the Year in a New Play
- Laurence Olivier Award for Actor of the Year in a Revival
- Laurence Olivier Award for Best Actor
- Laurence Olivier Award for Best Actor in a Musical
- Molière Award for Best Actor
- NAACP Theatre Award for Best Lead Male – Equity
- NAACP Theatre Award for Best Lead Male – Local
- Tony Award for Best Actor in a Play
- Tony Award for Best Actor in a Musical

== See also ==
- Lists of acting awards
- List of film awards for lead actress
- List of television awards for Best Actress
- List of film awards for lead actor
- List of television awards for Best Actor
