= List of film acting awards =

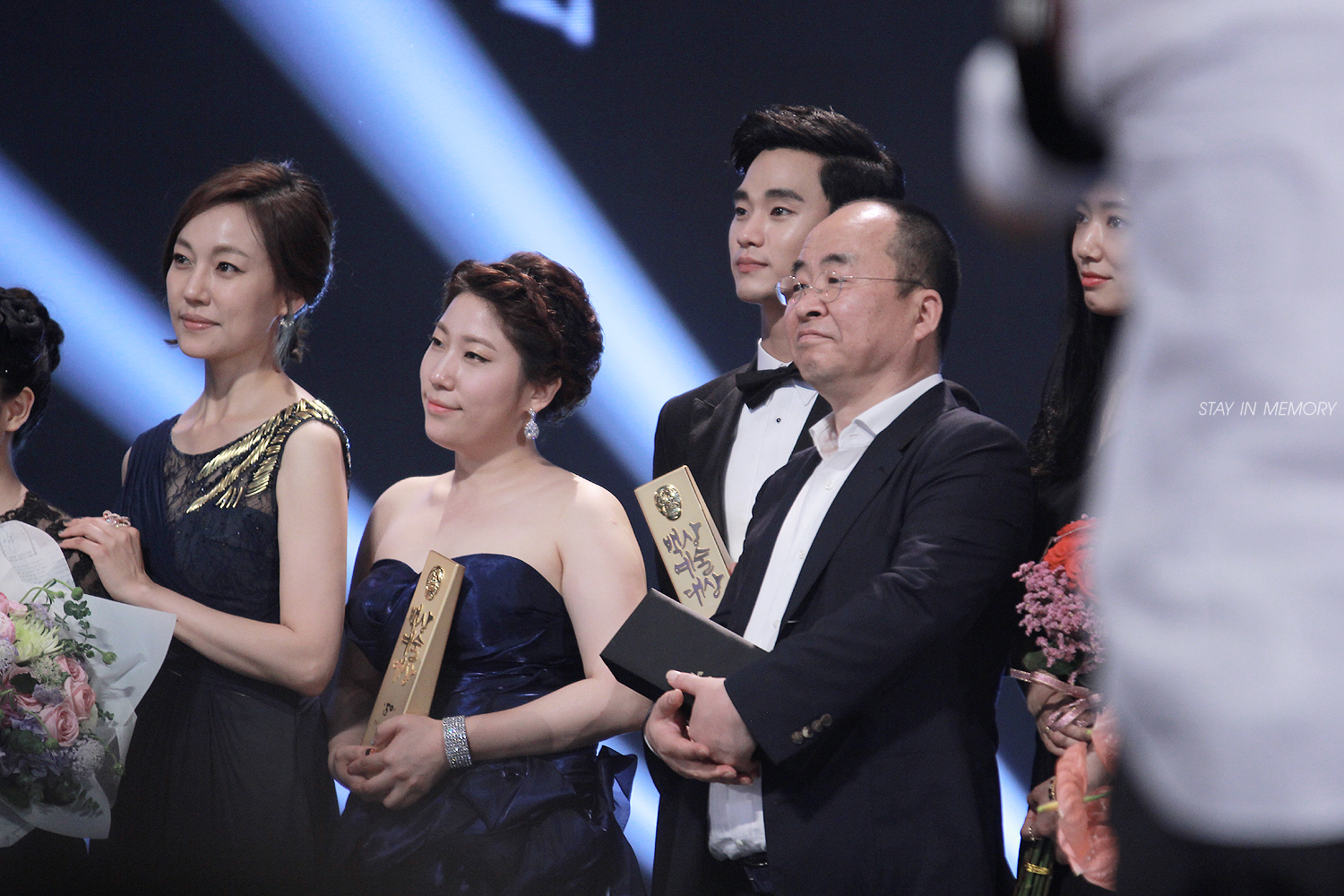
2014 Baeksang Arts Awards winners

This list of film acting awards is an index to articles that describe awards given to actors and actresses in films. It includes general awards, best cast awards, and awards for debut actresses and actors. It excludes awards for lead actress, lead actor and supporting actor (male and female), which are covered by separate lists.

== General ==
Country	Award	Venue sponsor	Description
South Korea	Baeksang Arts Awards for Most Popular Actor (Film)	Baeksang Arts Awards	
South Korea	Baeksang Arts Awards for Most Popular Actress (Film)	Baeksang Arts Awards	
Europe	European Film Award for Best Supporting Performance	European Film Academy	
United States	Women in Film & Video-DC Women of Vision Awards	Women in Film and Television International	Creative and technical achievements in media
United States	Women in Film Crystal + Lucy Awards	Women in Film and Television International	Excellence in entertainment

== Best Cast ==
Country	Award	Sponsor	Description
United States	Black Reel Award for Outstanding Ensemble	Black Reel Awards	African Americans
United States	Boston Society of Film Critics Award for Best Cast	Boston Society of Film Critics	
United States	Critics' Choice Movie Award for Best Acting Ensemble	Broadcast Film Critics Association	
United States	Florida Film Critics Circle Award for Best Cast	Florida Film Critics Circle	
United States	Gotham Independent Film Award for Best Ensemble Cast	Gotham Awards	
United States	Independent Spirit Robert Altman Award	Independent Spirit Awards	
United States	National Board of Review Award for Best Cast	National Board of Review	
United States	Online Film Critics Society Award for Best Ensemble	Online Film Critics Society	
United States	San Diego Film Critics Society Award for Best Performance by an Ensemble	San Diego Film Critics Society	
United States	Satellite Award for Best Cast – Motion Picture	International Press Academy	
United States	Screen Actors Guild Award for Outstanding Performance by a Cast in a Motion Picture	Screen Actors Guild	
United States	Washington D.C. Area Film Critics Association Award for Best Ensemble	Washington D.C. Area Film Critics Association	

== Debut actress ==
Country	Award	Venue / sponsor	Language
South Korea	Baeksang Arts Awards for Best New Actress (Film)	Baeksang Arts Awards	Korean
United Kingdom	Empire Award for Best Female Newcomer	Empire (film magazine)	English
United Kingdom	Empire Award for Best Newcomer	Empire (film magazine)	English
India	Filmfare Award for Best Female Debut	Filmfare (film magazine)	Hindi
India	Producers Guild Film Award for Best Female Debut	Producers Guild Film Awards	Hindi
India	Filmfare Award for Best Female Debut – South	Filmfare (film magazine)	Telugu
India	SIIMA Award for Best Female Debut	Vibri Media Group	Telugu
India	Santosham Best Debut Actress Award	Santosham Film Awards	Telugu
India	ITFA Best New Actress Award	International Tamil Film Awards	Tamil
India	Vijay Award for Best Debut Actress	Star Vijay	Tamil
Macao	Golden Lotus Award for Best Newcomer	Macau Film and Television Media Association, China International Cultural Communication Center	Mandarin
China	Huabiao Award for Outstanding New Actress	Huabiao Awards	Mandarin
Taiwan	Golden Horse Award for Best New Performer	Golden Horse Film Festival and Awards	Taiwanese

== Male debut actors ==
Country	Award	Venue / sponsor	Language
South Korea	Baeksang Arts Awards for Best New Actor (Film)	Baeksang Arts Awards	Korean
United Kingdom	Empire Award for Best Male Newcomer	Empire film magazine	English
United Kingdom	Empire Award for Best Newcomer	Empire film magazine	English
United States	Bollywood Movie Award – Best Male Debut	Bollywood Movie Awards	Hindi
India	Gold Award for Debut in a Lead Role (Male)	Gold Awards	Hindi
India	IIFA Award for Star Debut of the Year – Male	International Indian Film Academy Awards	Hindi
India	SIIMA Award for Best Male Debut	Vibri Media Group	Telugu
India	Filmfare Award for Best Male Debut – South	Filmfare (film magazine)	Telugu
Taiwan	Golden Horse Award for Best New Performer	Golden Horse Film Festival and Awards	Taiwanese
Macau	Golden Lotus Award for Best Newcomer	Macau Film and Television Media Association, China International Cultural Communication Center	Mandarin
China	Huabiao Award for Outstanding New Actor	Huabiao Awards	Mandarin
India	ITFA Best New Actor Award	International Tamil Film Awards	Tamil
India	Vijay Award for Best Debut Actor	Vijay Awards	Tamil

== See also ==
- Lists of awards
- Lists of acting awards
- List of film awards
- List of film awards for lead actress
- List of film awards for lead actor
- List of awards for supporting actor
