= List of awards for male actors =

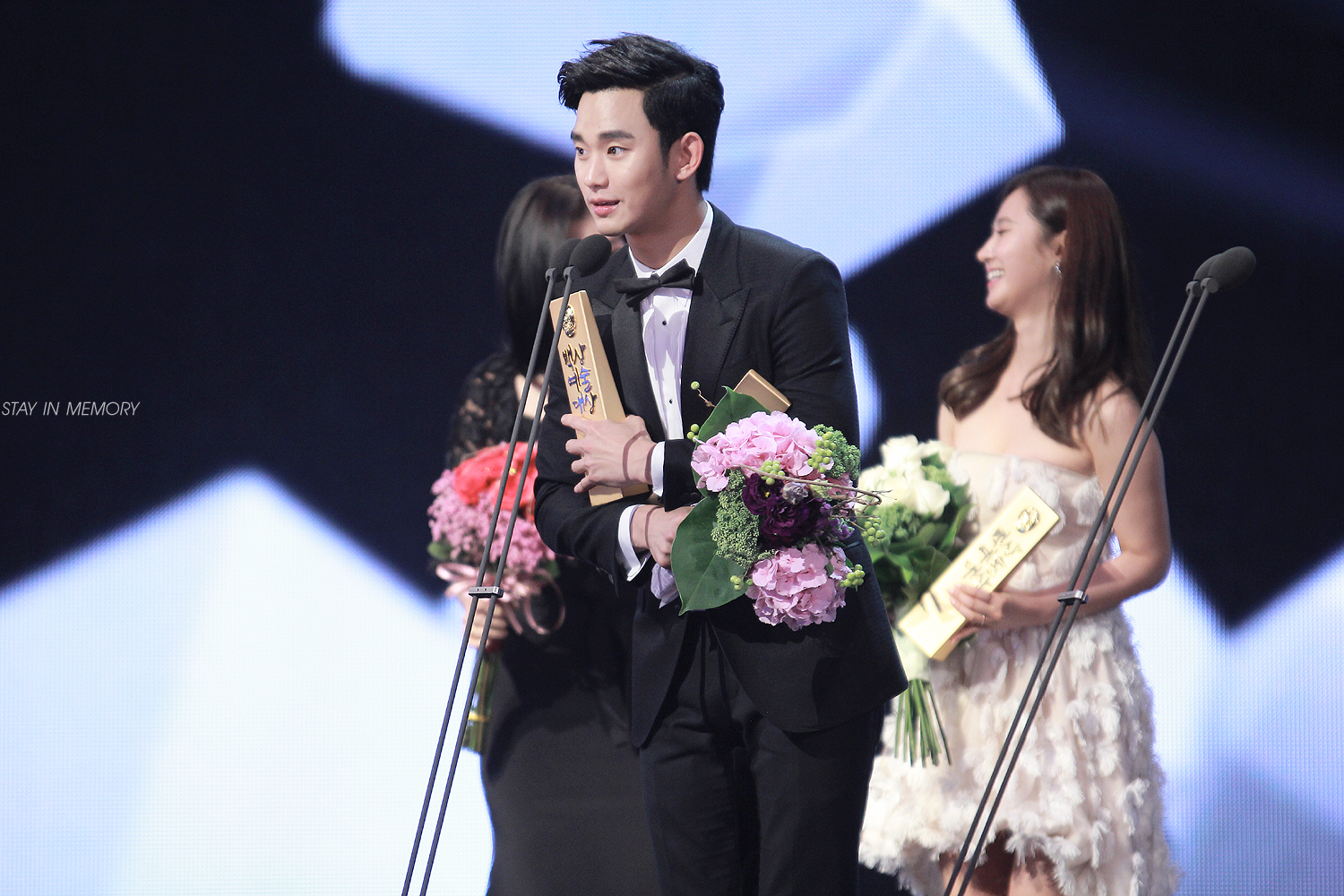
Kim Soo-hyun Baeksang Arts Awards 2014

This list of awards for male actors is an index to articles to describe awards given to male actors. It excludes film awards for lead actor and television awards for Best Actor, which are covered by separate lists.

== General ==
Country	Award	Sponsor	Notes
United States	AVN Award for Best Actor	AVN (magazine)	Pornographic actors
United States	AVN Award for Best Supporting Actor	AVN (magazine)	Pornographic actors
United States	AVN Award for Male Foreign Performer of the Year	AVN (magazine)	Pornographic actors
United States	AVN Award for Male Performer of the Year	AVN (magazine)	Pornographic actors
France	Cannes Film Festival Award for Best Actor	Cannes Film Festival	
Canada	Dora Mavor Moore Award for Outstanding Performance by a Male in a Principal Role – Musical	Toronto Alliance for the Performing Arts	Theatre
Canada	Dora Mavor Moore Award for Outstanding Performance by a Male in a Principal Role – Play (Large Theatre)	Toronto Alliance for the Performing Arts	Theatre
United States	Drama Desk Award for Outstanding Actor in a Musical	Drama Desk	
United States	Drama Desk Award for Outstanding Featured Actor in a Musical	Drama Desk	
United States	Drama Desk Award for Outstanding Actor in a Play	Drama Desk	
United States	Drama Desk Award for Outstanding Featured Actor in a Play	Drama Desk	
Australia	Helpmann Award for Best Male Actor in a Play	Live Performance Australia	
Australia	Helpmann Award for Best Male Actor in a Supporting Role in a Play	Live Performance Australia	
Australia	Helpmann Award for Best Male Performer in an Opera	Live Performance Australia	
United States	Hollywood Film Award for Best Actor	Hollywood Film Awards	
India	ITA Award for Best Actor Drama	Indian Television Academy Awards	
Sri Lanka	Raigam Tele'es Best Teledrama Actor Award	Kingdom of Raigam	
Sri Lanka	Raigam Tele'es Best Teledrama Supporting Actor Award	Kingdom of Raigam	
Sri Lanka	Raigam Tele'es Best Upcoming Teledrama Actor Award	Kingdom of Raigam	
India	SIIMA for Best Actor – Malayalam	South Indian International Movie Awards	
India	SIIMA Award for Best Actor (Telugu)	South Indian International Movie Awards	
Germany	Silver Bear for Best Actor	Berlin International Film Festival	
Sri Lanka	Sumathi Best Teledrama Actor Award	Sumathi Group	
Italy	Volpi Cup for Best Actor	Venice Film Festival	

== Film awards for male debut actors ==
Country	Award	Sponsor	Notes
South Korea	Baeksang Arts Awards for Best New Actor (Film)	Baeksang Arts Awards	
South Korea	Baeksang Arts Awards for Best New Actor (TV)	Baeksang Arts Awards	
United States	Bollywood Movie Award – Best Male Debut	Bollywood Movie Awards	1999 and 2007; New York, United States
United Kingdom	Empire Award for Best Newcomer	Empire (film magazine)	
United Kingdom	Empire Award for Best Male Newcomer	Empire (film magazine)	From 2012
Taiwan	Golden Horse Award for Best New Performer	Golden Horse Film Festival and Awards	
Macau	Golden Lotus Award for Best Newcomer	Macau Film and Television Media Association and China International Cultural Communication Center	
China	Huabiao Award for Outstanding New Actor	Huabiao Awards	
India	Filmfare Award for Best Male Debut – South	Filmfare magazine	
India	SIIMA Award for Best Male Debut (Telugu)	South Indian International Movie Awards	
India	IIFA Award for Star Debut of the Year – Male	International Indian Film Academy	
India	Gold Award for Debut in a Lead Role (Male)	Gold Awards	
India	ITFA Best New Actor Award	International Tamil Film Awards	
India	Vijay Award for Best Debut Actor	Vijay Awards	

== TV awards for lead actor ==
Country	Award	Sponsor	Notes
India	Gold Award for Best Actor in a Lead Role	Gold Awards	
India	Indian Telly Award for Best Actor in a Lead Role	Indian Telly Awards	
India	ITA Award for Best Actor Drama	Indian Television Academy Awards	
India	ITA Award for Best Actor Popular	Indian Telly Awards	Voted by public
India	Producers Guild Film Award for Best Actor in a Drama Series	Producers Guild Film Awards	

== Television awards for Best Supporting Actor ==
Country	Award	Sponsor	Notes
Australia	AACTA Award for Best Guest or Supporting Actor in a Television Drama	Australian Academy of Cinema and Television Arts	
United States	Best Supporting Actor: Television Movie/Cable	Black Reel Awards	African American actors
United States	Black Reel Award for Outstanding Supporting Actor, Television Movie or Limited Series	Black Reel Awards	African American actors
United States	Black Reel Award for Outstanding Supporting Actor, TV Movie or Limited Series	Black Reel Awards	African American actors
United States	Critics' Choice Television Award for Best Supporting Actor in a Comedy Series	Critics' Choice Television Award	
United States	Critics' Choice Television Award for Best Supporting Actor in a Drama Series	Critics' Choice Television Award	
United States	Daytime Emmy Award for Outstanding Supporting Actor in a Drama Series	National Academy of Television Arts and Sciences, Academy of Television Arts & Sciences	
United States	Primetime Emmy Award for Outstanding Supporting Actor in a Comedy Series	Academy of Television Arts & Sciences	
United States	Primetime Emmy Award for Outstanding Supporting Actor in a Drama Series	Academy of Television Arts & Sciences	
United States	Primetime Emmy Award for Outstanding Supporting Actor in a Limited Series or Movie	Academy of Television Arts & Sciences	
Taiwan	Golden Bell Award for Best Supporting Actor in a Miniseries or Television Film	Golden Bell Awards	
Taiwan	Golden Bell Award for Best Supporting Actor	Golden Bell Awards	
United States	Golden Globe Award for Best Supporting Actor – Series, Miniseries or Television Film	Hollywood Foreign Press Association	
Brazil	Prêmio Extra de Televisão de melhor ator coadjuvante	Extra (Grupo Globo)	
United States	Satellite Award for Best Supporting Actor – Series, Miniseries or Television Film	International Press Academy	
United States	Satellite Award for Best Supporting Actor – Television Series	International Press Academy	
Sri Lanka	Sumathi Best Teledrama Supporting Actor Award	Sumathi Group	
Hong Kong	TVB Anniversary Award for Best Supporting Actor	TVB	

== See also ==
- Leading actor
- Lists of awards
- Lists of acting awards
- List of film awards for lead actor
- List of television awards for Best Actor
