= List of media awards honoring women =

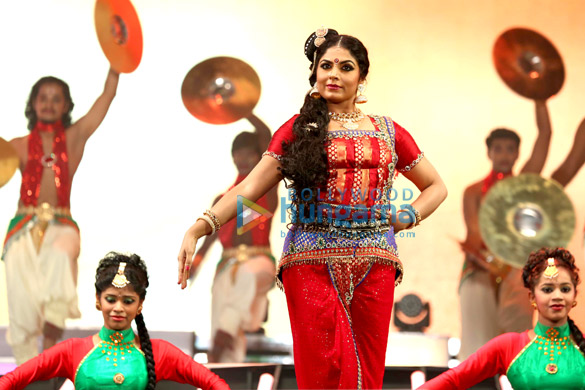
Asha Sharath performing at the 61st Idea Filmfare Awards South

This list of media awards honoring women is an index to articles about notable awards honoring women. The list includes general, literary and music awards for women. It excludes awards for actresses, including film awards for lead actress and television awards for Best Actress, which are covered by separate lists.

== General ==
Country	Award	Sponsor	Notes
United States	Alliance of Women Film Journalists Award for Best Woman Director	Alliance of Women Film Journalists	Woman director
United States	Women's Image Network Awards	Women's Image Network |Women's Image Network Awards = Promoting outstanding media (created by both men and women), The Women's Image Awards advance the value of women and girls. Now in year 23, these awards are a production of Women's Image Network, and are also called The WIN Awards.	
United Kingdom	Funny Women Awards	Funny Women	Women comedians
United States	Gracie Awards	Alliance for Women in Media	Programming created for women, by women, and about women, as well as individuals who have made exemplary contributions in electronic media and affiliates
Pakistan	Hum Award for Best Model Female	Hum Network	Female model who has achieved outstanding recognition within the fashion industry
Chile	Lenka Franulic Award	National Association of Women Journalists of Chile	Career achievement in women's journalism
United States	The Matrix Awards	New York Women in Communications	Exceptional women in the fields of arts, advertising, entertainment, film, television, theater, books, broadcasting, magazines, newspapers, public relations and new media.
United States	Women in Film & Video-DC Women of Vision Awards	Women in Film and Television International, Women in Film & Video	Women’s creative and technical achievements in media
United States	Women in Film Crystal + Lucy Awards	Women in Film and Television International	Women in communications and media
United States	Women's Caucus for Art Lifetime Achievement Award	Women's Caucus for Art	Women's achievements in the arts
United States	Leading Ladies of Entertainment	The Latin Recording Academy	Women's achievements in the arts and science in the Latin entertainment field
United States	Lumine Lifetime Achievement Award	Gaylord College of Journalism and Mass Communications, University of Oklahoma	Women media professionals who have made significant and sustained contributions to the media industry

== Literary ==
Country	Award	Sponsor	Notes
Canada, United States	Carol Shields Prize for Fiction		Literature published in English (including translation) by North American women or non-binary writers.
United Kingdom	Rose Mary Crawshay Prize	British Academy	Female scholars
Australia	Barbara Jefferis Award	Australian Society of Authors	Best novel written by an Australian author that depicts women and girls in a positive way or otherwise empowers the status of women and girls in society".
Thailand	Chommanard Book Prize	Bangkok Bank, Praphansarn Publishing House	Female literary talent
Australia	Davitt Award	Sisters in Crime	Australian crime fiction, by women, for both adults and young adults
United States	Lulu Awards	Friends of Lulu	Women-friendly and reader- friendly work in comics
United States	Janet Heidinger Kafka Prize	Susan B. Anthony Institute for Gender and Women's Studies, University of Rochester	Fiction by an American woman
Canada	Marian Engel Award	Writers' Trust of Canada	Female Canadian novelist in mid-career for her entire body of work
Japan	Murasaki Shikibu Prize	City of Uji, Japan	Awarded annually to an outstanding piece of literature in Japanese by a female author
Australia	Nita Kibble Literary Award	Kibble Literary Awards	Works of women writers of fiction or non-fiction classified as 'life writing'.
Canada	Pat Lowther Award	League of Canadian Poets	Best book of poetry by a Canadian woman
Italy	Rapallo Carige Prize	Municipality of Rapallo, Banca Carige	New works by women writers in Italian
Canada	Room writing contests	Room (magazine)	Writers who identify as women or genderqueer
Germany	Roswitha Prize	City of Bad Gandersheim	Prize for literature that is given solely to women
United Kingdom	SI Leeds Literary Prize	Soroptimist International of Leeds	Unpublished fiction written by Black and Asian women resident in the UK
Mexico	Sor Juana Inés de la Cruz Prize	Guadalajara International Book Fair	Book written in Spanish by a female author
Australia	Stella Prize	Stella Prize	Writing by Australian women in all genres
United States, United Kingdom	Susan Smith Blackburn Prize	Susan Smith Blackburn Prize	Women who have written works of outstanding quality for the English-speaking theatre
United Kingdom	Warwick Prize for Women in Translation	University of Warwick	Translated work by a female author published in English
United Kingdom	Women's Prize for Fiction	Women's Prize for Fiction	Best original full-length novel written in English
United Kingdom	Women's Prize for Non-Fiction	Women's Prize for Non-Fiction	Launching in 2023 for 2024 prize

== Music ==
Country	Award	Sponsor	Notes
United States	American Music Award for Favorite Country Female Artist	American Music Awards	
United States	American Music Award for Favorite Pop/Rock Female Artist	American Music Awards	
United States	American Music Award for Favorite Soul/R&B Female Artist	American Music Awards	
Australia	ARIA Award for Best Female Artist	Australian Recording Industry Association	
United States	BET Award for Best Female Hip-Hop Artist	BET Awards	
United States	BET Award for Best Female R&B Artist	BET Awards	
United Kingdom	Brit Award for British Female Solo Artist	British Phonographic Industry	
United Kingdom	Brit Award for International Female Solo Artist	British Phonographic Industry	
India	Filmfare Award for Best Female Playback Singer – Hindi	Filmfare magazine	
India	Filmfare Award for Best Female Playback Singer – Kannada	Filmfare magazine	
India	Filmfare Award for Best Female Playback Singer – Malayalam	Filmfare magazine	
India	Filmfare Award for Best Female Playback Singer – Tamil	Filmfare magazine	
India	Filmfare Award for Best Female Playback Singer – Telugu	Filmfare magazine	
India	GiMA Award for Best Female Playback Singer	Global Indian Music Academy Awards	
Taiwan	Golden Melody Award for Best Female Mandarin Singer	Golden Melody Awards	
United States	Grammy Award for Best Female Pop Vocal Performance	The Recording Academy	
United States	Grammy Award for Best Female Rap Solo Performance	The Recording Academy	
United States	Grammy Award for Best Female Rock Vocal Performance	The Recording Academy	
United States	Grammy Award for Best Gospel Vocal Performance, Female	The Recording Academy	
United States	Grammy Award for Best Jazz Vocal Performance, Female	The Recording Academy	
United States	Grammy Award for Best Soul Gospel Performance, Female	The Recording Academy	
United States	IHeartRadio Music Award for Female Artist of the Year	iHeartRadio	
India	IIFA Award for Best Female Playback Singer	International Indian Film Academy	
India	ITFA Best Female Playback Award	International Tamil Film Awards	
United States	Latin Grammy Award for Best Female Pop Vocal Album	The Latin Recording Academy	
United States	Lo Nuestro Award for Pop Female Artist of the Year	Univision	
United States	Lo Nuestro Award for Regional Mexican Female Artist of the Year	Univision	
United States	Lo Nuestro Award for Tropical Female Artist of the Year	Univision	
South Korea	Mnet Asian Music Award for Best Female Artist	Mnet (TV channel)	
South Korea	Mnet Asian Music Award for Best Female Group	Mnet (TV channel)	
United States	MTV Video Music Award for Best Female Video	MTV	
India	Nandi Award for Best Female Dubbing Artist	Nandi Awards	
India	Nandi Award for Best Female Playback Singer	Nandi Awards	
India	National Film Award for Best Female Playback Singer	Directorate of Film Festivals	
India	Producers Guild Film Award for Best Female Playback Singer	Producers Guild Film Awards	
India	Screen Award for Best Female Playback	Screen (magazine)	
United States	Soul Train Music Award for Best R&B/Soul Album – Female	Soul Train Music Awards	
United States	Soul Train Music Award for Best R&B/Soul Female Artist	Soul Train Music Awards	
United States	Soul Train Music Award for Best R&B/Soul Single – Female	Soul Train Music Awards	
United States	Tejano Music Award for Female Entertainer of the Year	Tejano Music Awards	
United States	Tejano Music Award for Female Vocalist of the Year	Tejano Music Awards	
India	Zee Cine Award for Best Playback Singer – Female	Zee Cine Awards	

== See also ==
- Lists of awards
- List of awards honoring women
- List of media awards
- List of awards for actresses
- List of film awards for lead actress
- List of television awards for Best Actress
