= List of awards for young actors =

This list of awards for young actors is an index to articles to describe awards given to young actors.

Country	Award	Venue / sponsor	Notes
Australia	AACTA Award for Best Young Actor	Australian Academy of Cinema and Television Arts	
United States	Academy Juvenile Award	Academy of Motion Picture Arts and Sciences	
United Kingdom	BAFTA Rising Star Award	British Academy of Film and Television Arts	
France	César Award for Best Male Revelation	Académie des Arts et Techniques du Cinéma	
France	César Award for Best Female Revelation	Académie des Arts et Techniques du Cinéma	
United States	Critics' Choice Movie Award for Best Young Performer	Broadcast Film Critics Association	
United States	Daytime Emmy Award for Outstanding Younger Actor in a Drama Series	National Academy of Television Arts and Sciences; Academy of Television Arts & Sciences	
United States	Daytime Emmy Award for Outstanding Younger Actress in a Drama Series	National Academy of Television Arts and Sciences; Academy of Television Arts & Sciences	
Japan	Elan d'or Award for Newcomer of the Year	Elan d'or Awards	
Europe	European Film Award for Best Young Actor or Actress	European Film Awards	
United States	Golden Globe Award for New Star of the Year – Actor	Hollywood Foreign Press Association	
United States	Golden Globe Award for New Star of the Year – Actress	Hollywood Foreign Press Association	
United States	Gotham Independent Film Award for Breakthrough Actor	Gotham Awards	
Spain	Goya Award for Best New Actor	Goya Awards	
Spain	Goya Award for Best New Actress	Goya Awards	
Pakistan	Hum Award for Best Actor in a Negative Role	Hum Awards	
France	Lumière Award for Best Male Revelation	Lumière Awards	
France	Lumière Award for Best Female Revelation	Lumière Awards	
Belgium	Magritte Award for Most Promising Actor	Académie André Delvaux	
Belgium	Magritte Award for Most Promising Actress	Académie André Delvaux	
United States	MTV Movie Award for Best Breakthrough Performance	MTV Movie & TV Awards	
United States	Saturn Award for Best Performance by a Younger Actor	Academy of Science Fiction, Fantasy and Horror Films	
United States	Saturn Award for Best Performance by a Younger Actor in a Television Series	Academy of Science Fiction, Fantasy and Horror Films	
Sri Lanka	Sumathi Best Teledrama Child Actor Award	Sumathi Group	
Mexico	TVyNovelas Award for Best Young Lead Actor	Televisa, TVyNovelas	
Mexico	TVyNovelas Award for Best Young Lead Actress	Televisa, TVyNovelas	
United States	Young Artist Award for Best Leading Young Actress in a Feature Film	Young Artist Award	
United States	Young Artist Award for Best Performance in a Daytime TV Series - Young Actress	Young Artist Award	
United States	Young Artist Award for Best Leading Young Actor in a Feature Film	Young Artist Award	
United States	Young Artist Award for Best Leading Young Actress in a Feature Film	Young Artist Award	
United States	Young Artist Former Child Star Lifetime Achievement Award	Young Artist Award	
United States	YoungStar Award	The Hollywood Reporter	

== See also ==
- Lists of awards
- Lists of acting awards
