= List of television acting awards =

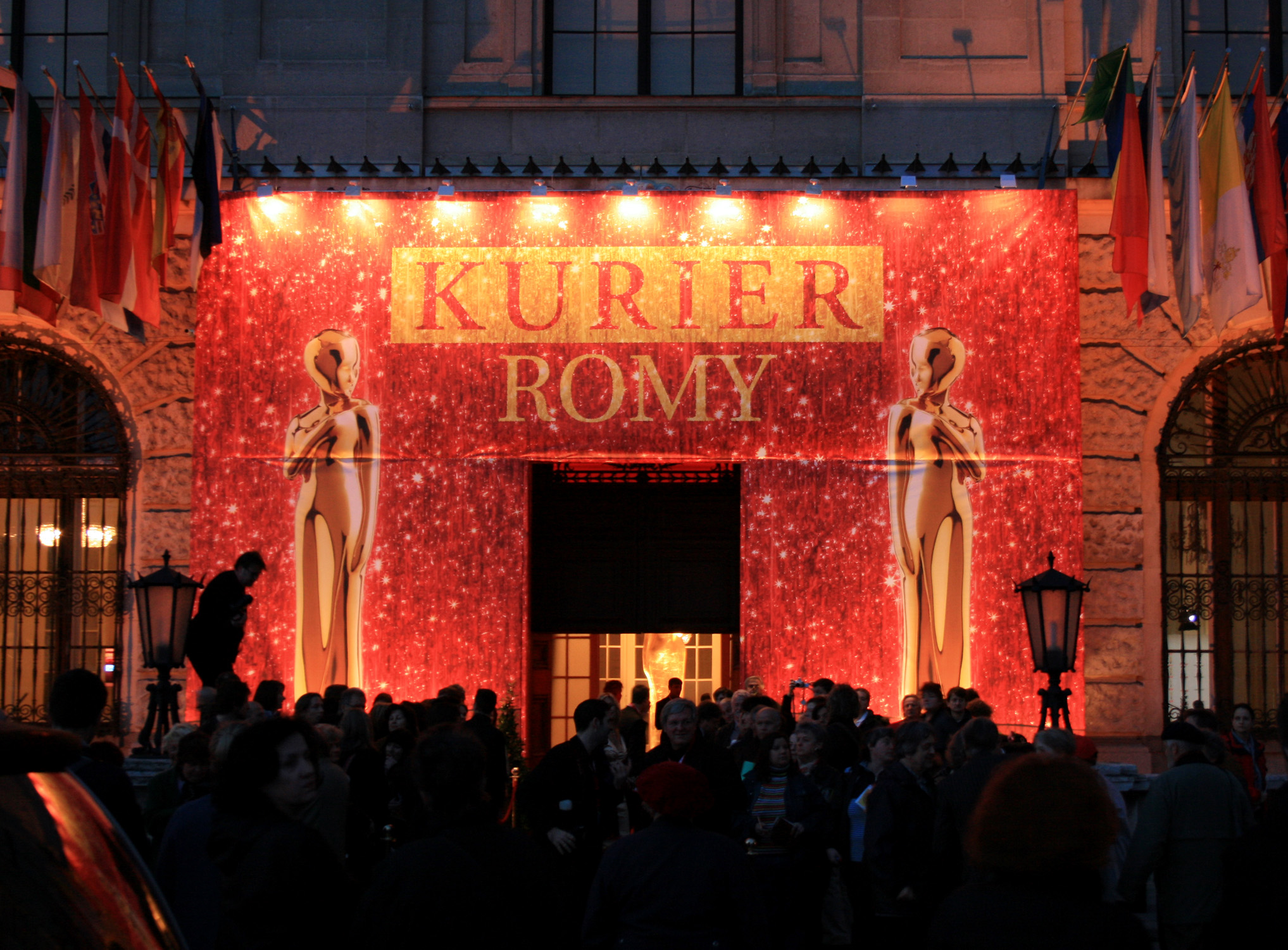
Entrance to the 2008 Romy Awards

This list of television acting awards is an index to articles about awards for acting in television shows. The list includes general awards and awards for best supporting actor and actress. It excludes awards for Best Actress and Best Actor, which are covered by separate lists.

== General ==
Country	Award	Venue / sponsor	Notes
South Korea	Baeksang Arts Awards for Most Popular Actor (TV)	Baeksang Arts Awards	
South Korea	Baeksang Arts Awards for Most Popular Actress (TV)	Baeksang Arts Awards	
Australia	Equity Ensemble Awards	Media, Entertainment and Arts Alliance	
Sri Lanka	Raigam Tele'es Most Popular Actor Award	Raigam Tele'es	
Sri Lanka	Raigam Tele'es Most Popular Actress Award	Raigam Tele'es	
Austria	Romy award	Romy (TV award)	Various categories
United States	Screen Actors Guild Award for Outstanding Performance by an Ensemble in a Comedy Series	Screen Actors Guild	
United States	Screen Actors Guild Award for Outstanding Performance by an Ensemble in a Drama Series	Screen Actors Guild	
Sri Lanka	Sumathi Most Popular Actor Award	Sumathi Group	

== Best Supporting Actor ==
Country	Award	Venue / sponsor	Description
Australia	AACTA Award for Best Guest or Supporting Actor in a Television Drama	Australian Academy of Cinema and Television Arts	
United States	Best Supporting Actor: Television Movie/Cable	Black Reel Awards	African American
United States	Black Reel Award for Outstanding Supporting Actor, Television Movie or Limited Series	Black Reel Awards	African American
United States	Black Reel Award for Outstanding Supporting Actor, TV Movie or Limited Series	Black Reel Awards	African American
United States	Critics' Choice Television Award for Best Supporting Actor in a Comedy Series	Critics' Choice Television Award	
United States	Critics' Choice Television Award for Best Supporting Actor in a Drama Series	Critics' Choice Television Award	
United States	Daytime Emmy Award for Outstanding Supporting Actor in a Drama Series	National Academy of Television Arts and Sciences, Academy of Television Arts & Sciences	
United States	Primetime Emmy Award for Outstanding Supporting Actor in a Comedy Series	Academy of Television Arts & Sciences	
United States	Primetime Emmy Award for Outstanding Supporting Actor in a Drama Series	Academy of Television Arts & Sciences	
United States	Primetime Emmy Award for Outstanding Supporting Actor in a Limited Series or Movie	Academy of Television Arts & Sciences	
Taiwan	Golden Bell Award for Best Supporting Actor in a Miniseries or Television Film	Golden Bell Awards	
Taiwan	Golden Bell Award for Best Supporting Actor	Golden Bell Awards	
United States	Golden Globe Award for Best Supporting Actor – Series, Miniseries or Television Film	Hollywood Foreign Press Association	
Brazil	Prêmio Extra de Televisão de melhor ator coadjuvante	Extra (Grupo Globo)	
United States	Satellite Award for Best Supporting Actor – Series, Miniseries or Television Film	International Press Academy	
United States	Satellite Award for Best Supporting Actor – Television Series	International Press Academy	
Sri Lanka	Sumathi Best Teledrama Supporting Actor Award	Sumathi Group	
Hong Kong	TVB Anniversary Award for Best Supporting Actor	TVB	

== Best Supporting Actress ==
Country	Award	Venue / sponsor	Description
Australia	AACTA Award for Best Guest or Supporting Actress in a Television Drama	Australian Academy of Cinema and Television Arts	
United States	Black Reel Award for Best Supporting Actress: Television Movie/Cable	Black Reel Awards	African American
United States	Black Reel Award for Outstanding Supporting Actress, Television Movie or Limited Series	Black Reel Awards	African American
United States	Black Reel Award for Outstanding Supporting Actress, TV Movie or Limited Series	Black Reel Awards	African American
United States	Critics' Choice Television Award for Best Supporting Actress in a Comedy Series	Critics' Choice Television Award	
United States	Critics' Choice Television Award for Best Supporting Actress in a Drama Series	Critics' Choice Television Award	
United States	Daytime Emmy Award for Outstanding Supporting Actress in a Drama Series	National Academy of Television Arts and Sciences, Academy of Television Arts & Sciences	
United States	Primetime Emmy Award for Outstanding Supporting Actress in a Comedy Series	Academy of Television Arts & Sciences	
United States	Primetime Emmy Award for Outstanding Supporting Actress in a Drama Series	Academy of Television Arts & Sciences	
United States	Primetime Emmy Award for Outstanding Supporting Actress in a Limited Series or Movie	Academy of Television Arts & Sciences	
Taiwan	Golden Bell Award for Best Supporting Actress in a Miniseries or Television Film	Golden Bell Awards	
Taiwan	Golden Bell Award for Best Supporting Actress	Golden Bell Awards	
United States	Golden Globe Award for Best Supporting Actress – Series, Miniseries or Television Film	Hollywood Foreign Press Association	
United States	Satellite Award for Best Supporting Actress – Series, Miniseries or Television Film	International Press Academy	
United States	Satellite Award for Best Supporting Actress – Television Series	International Press Academy	
Sri Lanka	Sumathi Best Teledrama Supporting Actress Award	Sumathi Group	
Hong Kong	TVB Anniversary Award for Best Supporting Actress	TVB	

== See also ==
- Lists of awards
- Lists of acting awards
- List of television awards
- List of television awards for Best Actress
- List of television awards for Best Actor
