= List of awards for actresses =

This list of awards for actresses is an index to articles to describe awards given to actresses. It excludes film awards for lead actress and television awards for Best Actress, which are covered by separate lists.

== General ==
Country	Award	Sponsor	Notes
United States	AVN Award for Female Performer of the Year	AVN (magazine)	Female porn star who has had the best body of work in the previous year
Denmark	Bodil Award for Best Actress in a Leading Role	Danish Film Critics Association	Best performance by an actress in a leading role in a Danish produced film
France	Cannes Film Festival Award for Best Actress	Cannes Film Festival	Can be for lead or supporting roles
Canada	Dora Mavor Moore Award for Outstanding Performance by a Female in a Principal Role – Musical	Toronto Alliance for the Performing Arts	
Canada	Dora Mavor Moore Award for Outstanding Performance by a Female in a Principal Role – Play (Large Theatre)	Toronto Alliance for the Performing Arts	
United States	Drama Desk Award for Outstanding Actress in a Musical	Drama Desk	
United States	Drama Desk Award for Outstanding Featured Actress in a Musical	Drama Desk	
United States	Drama Desk Award for Outstanding Actress in a Play	Drama Desk	
United States	Drama Desk Award for Outstanding Featured Actress in a Play	Drama Desk	
Australia	Helpmann Award for Best Female Actor in a Play	Australian Entertainment Industry Association	
Australia	Helpmann Award for Best Female Actor in a Supporting Role in a Play	Australian Entertainment Industry Association	
United States	Hollywood Actress Award	Hollywood Film Awards	
United States	Hollywood Supporting Actress Award	Hollywood Film Festival	
India	Indian Telly Award for Best Child Artiste - Female	Indian Telly Awards	
India	ITA Award for Best Actress in a Negative Role	Indian Television Academy Awards	
United States	Lucille Lortel Award for Outstanding Lead Actress in a Play	Lucille Lortel Awards	
India	Nandi Award for Best Female Comedian	Nandi Awards	
Sri Lanka	Raigam Tele'es Best Teledrama Actress Award	Kingdom of Raigam	
Sri Lanka	Raigam Tele'es Best Teledrama Supporting Actress Award	Kingdom of Raigam	
Sri Lanka	Raigam Tele'es Best Upcoming Teledrama Actress Award	Kingdom of Raigam	
India	SIIMA for Best Actress – Malayalam	South Indian International Movie Awards	
Germany	Silver Bear for Best Actress	Berlin International Film Festival	
Sri Lanka	Sumathi Best Teledrama Actress Award	Sumathi Group	
Sri Lanka	Sumathi Most Popular Actress Award	Sumathi Group	
Mexico	TVyNovelas Award for Best Antagonist Actress	Televisa, TVyNovelas	
Italy	Volpi Cup for Best Actress	Venice Film Festival	
India	Zee Cine Award for Best Actor in a Supporting Role – Female	Zee Entertainment Enterprises	
India	Zee Cine Critics Award for Best Actor – Female	Zee Entertainment Enterprises	

== Debut actress ==
Country	Award	Sponsor	Notes
South Korea	Baeksang Arts Awards for Best New Actress (Film)	Baeksang Arts Awards	
South Korea	Baeksang Arts Awards for Best New Actress (TV)	Baeksang Arts Awards	
United Kingdom	Empire Award for Best Female Newcomer	Empire (film magazine)	Introduced in 2012
United Kingdom	Empire Award for Best Newcomer	Empire (film magazine)	Both male and female
India	Filmfare Award for Best Female Debut	Filmfare	Hindi films
India	Filmfare Award for Best Female Debut – South	Filmfare	Telugu & Tamil films
India	Gold Award for Debut in a Lead Role (Female)	Gold Awards	TV series
Taiwan	Golden Horse Award for Best New Performer	Golden Horse Film Festival and Awards	
Macau	Golden Lotus Award for Best Newcomer	Macau Film and Television Media Association and China International Cultural Communication Center	
China	Huabiao Award for Outstanding New Actress	Huabiao Awards	Chinese (Mandarin) films
India	ITFA Best New Actress Award	International Tamil Film Awards	
India	Producers Guild Film Award for Best Female Debut	Film & Television Producers Guild	
India	Santosham Best Debut Actress Award	Santosham Film Awards	Telugu films
India	SIIMA Award for Best Female Debut	South Indian International Movie Awards	Telugu films
India	Vijay Award for Best Debut Actress	Star Vijay	Tamil films

== Best supporting actress (television) ==
Country	Award	Sponsor	Notes
Australia	AACTA Award for Best Guest or Supporting Actress in a Television Drama	Australian Academy of Cinema and Television Arts	
United States	Black Reel Award for Best Supporting Actress: Television Movie/Cable	Black Reel Awards	African-Americans
United States	Black Reel Award for Outstanding Supporting Actress, Television Movie or Limited Series	Black Reel Awards	African-Americans
United States	Black Reel Award for Outstanding Supporting Actress, TV Movie or Limited Series	Black Reel Awards	African-Americans
United States and Canada	Critics' Choice Television Award for Best Supporting Actress in a Comedy Series	Broadcast Film Critics Association	
United States and Canada	Critics' Choice Television Award for Best Supporting Actress in a Drama Series	Broadcast Film Critics Association	
United States	Daytime Emmy Award for Outstanding Supporting Actress in a Drama Series	National Academy of Television Arts and Sciences, Academy of Television Arts & Sciences	
United States	Primetime Emmy Award for Outstanding Supporting Actress in a Comedy Series	Academy of Television Arts & Sciences	
United States	Primetime Emmy Award for Outstanding Supporting Actress in a Drama Series	Academy of Television Arts & Sciences	
United States	Primetime Emmy Award for Outstanding Supporting Actress in a Limited Series or Movie	Academy of Television Arts & Sciences	
Taiwan	Golden Bell Award for Best Supporting Actress in a Miniseries or Television Film	Golden Bell Awards	
Taiwan	Golden Bell Award for Best Supporting Actress	Golden Bell Awards	
United States	Golden Globe Award for Best Supporting Actress – Series, Miniseries or Television Film	Hollywood Foreign Press Association	
United States	Satellite Award for Best Supporting Actress – Series, Miniseries or Television Film	International Press Academy	
United States	Satellite Award for Best Supporting Actress – Television Series	International Press Academy	
Sri Lanka	Sumathi Best Teledrama Supporting Actress Award	Sumathi Group	
Hong Kong	TVB Anniversary Award for Best Supporting Actress	TVB	

== See also ==
- Lists of awards
- Lists of acting awards
- List of film awards for lead actress
- List of television awards for Best Actress
