= List of film awards for lead actor =

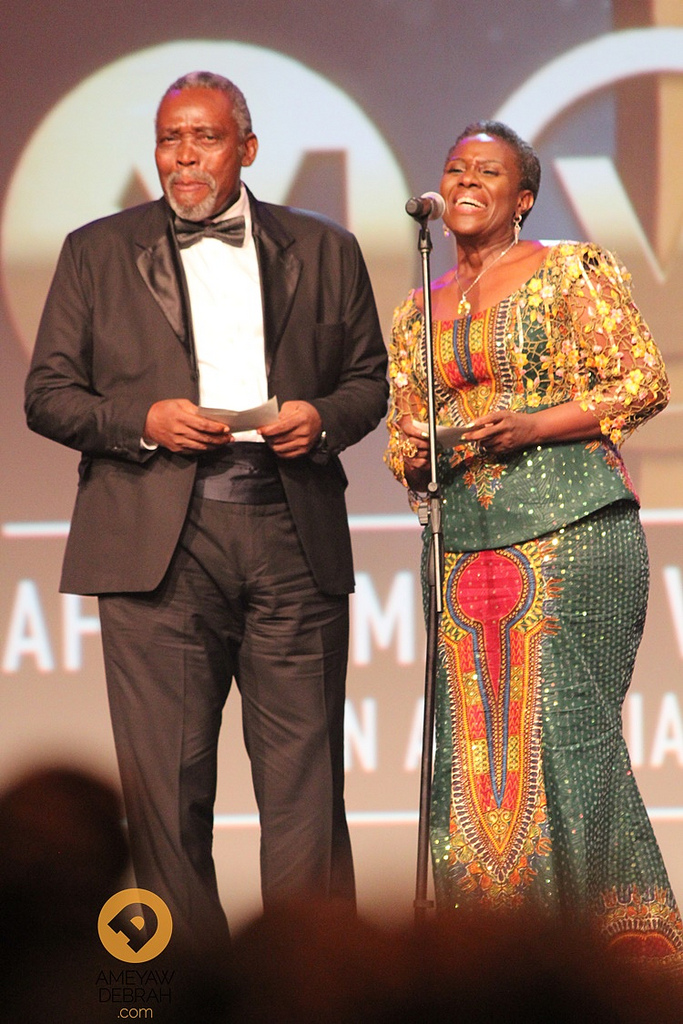
2007 AMAA winner Olu Jacobs (left)

This list of film awards for lead actor is an index to articles about awards for the lead actor or "Best Actor" in a film. The lists is organized by the region and country of the sponsoring organization or festival, but some awards are not restricted to films or actors from that country. Thus the David di Donatello for Best Foreign Actor, awarded by the Italian Academy of Films, is given to non-Italian actors.

== Africa ==
Country	Award	Venue / sponsor	Notes
Nigeria	Africa Movie Academy Award for Best Actor in a Leading Role	Africa Movie Academy Awards	

== Americas ==
Country	Award	Venue / sponsor	Notes
Canada	Canadian Screen Award for Best Actor	Academy of Canadian Cinema & Television	
Canada	Prix Iris for Best Actor	Québec Cinéma	
Canada	Toronto Film Critics Association Award for Best Actor	Toronto Film Critics Association	
Canada	Vancouver Film Critics Circle Award for Best Actor in a Canadian Film	Vancouver Film Critics Circle	
Canada	Vancouver Film Critics Circle Award for Best Actor	Vancouver Film Critics Circle	
Mexico	Ariel Award for Best Actor	Academia Mexicana de Artes y Ciencias Cinematográficas	
United States	AVN Award for Best Actor	AVN magazine	
United States	Academy Award for Best Actor	Academy of Motion Picture Arts and Sciences	
United States	Alliance of Women Film Journalists Award for Best Actor	Alliance of Women Film Journalists	
United States	Boston Society of Film Critics Award for Best Actor	Boston Society of Film Critics	
United States	Chicago Film Critics Association Award for Best Actor	Chicago Film Critics Association	
United States	Critics' Choice Movie Award for Best Actor in a Comedy	Broadcast Film Critics Association	
United States	Critics' Choice Movie Award for Best Actor in an Action Movie	Broadcast Film Critics Association	
United States	Critics' Choice Movie Award for Best Actor	Broadcast Film Critics Association	
United States	Dallas–Fort Worth Film Critics Association Award for Best Actor	Dallas–Fort Worth Film Critics Association	
United States	Fangoria Chainsaw Award for Best Actor	Fangoria magazine	
United States	Florida Film Critics Circle Award for Best Actor	Florida Film Critics Circle	
United States	Golden Globe Award for Best Actor – Motion Picture Drama	Hollywood Foreign Press Association	
United States	Golden Globe Award for Best Actor – Motion Picture Musical or Comedy	Hollywood Foreign Press Association	
United States	Golden Raspberry Award for Worst Actor	Golden Raspberry Awards	
United States	Gotham Independent Film Award for Best Actor	Gotham Awards	
United States	Houston Film Critics Society Award for Best Actor	Houston Film Critics Society	
United States	Independent Spirit Award for Best Male Lead	Independent Spirit Awards	
United States	Los Angeles Film Critics Association Award for Best Actor	Los Angeles Film Critics Association	
United States	NAACP Image Award for Outstanding Actor in a Motion Picture	NAACP Image Awards	African American
United States	National Board of Review Award for Best Actor	National Board of Review	
United States	National Society of Film Critics Award for Best Actor	National Society of Film Critics	
United States	New York Film Critics Circle Award for Best Actor	New York Film Critics Circle	
United States	New York Film Critics Online Award for Best Actress	New York Film Critics Circle	
United States	Online Film Critics Society Award for Best Actor	Online Film Critics Society	
United States	San Diego Film Critics Society Award for Best Actor	San Diego Film Critics Society	
United States	San Francisco Bay Area Film Critics Circle Award for Best Actor	San Francisco Bay Area Film Critics Circle	
United States	Satellite Award for Best Actor – Motion Picture	International Press Academy	
United States	Screen Actors Guild Award for Outstanding Performance by a Male Actor in a Leading Role	Screen Actors Guild	
United States	St. Louis Gateway Film Critics Association Award for Best Actor	St. Louis Film Critics Association	
United States	Washington D.C. Area Film Critics Association Award for Best Actor	Washington D.C. Area Film Critics Association	
United States	Young Artist Award for Best Leading Young Actor in a Feature Film	Young Artist Award	

== Asia ==
Country	Award	Venue / sponsor	Notes
China	Golden Rooster Award for Best Actor	Golden Rooster Awards	
China	Huabiao Award for Outstanding Actor	Huabiao Awards	
China	Hundred Flowers Award for Best Actor	China Film Association	
China	Shanghai Film Critics Award for Best Actor	Shanghai Film Critics Awards	
Hong Kong	Asian Film Award for Best Actor	Hong Kong International Film Festival	
Hong Kong	Hong Kong Film Award for Best Actor	Hong Kong Film Award	
India	Cinema Express Award for Best Actor – Tamil	Cinema Express Awards	Tamil
India	Filmfare Award for Best Actor - Hindi	Filmfare magazine	Hindi
India	Filmfare Award for Best Actor – Telugu	Filmfare magazine	Telugu
India	IFFI Best Actor Award (Male)	International Film Festival of India	
India	ITFA Best Actor Award	International Tamil Film Awards	Tamil
India	Kerala State Film Award for Best Actor	Kerala State Film Awards	Malayalam
India	Nandi Award for Best Actor	Nandi Awards (Andhra Pradesh State Film, Music, Television and Arts Awards)	Telugu
India	National Film Award for Best Actor	Directorate of Film Festivals	
India	SIIMA Award for Best Actor (Telugu)	South Indian International Movie Awards	Telugu
Indonesia	Citra Award for Best Leading Actor	Indonesian Film Festival	
Japan	Blue Ribbon Awards for Best Actor	Blue Ribbon Awards	
Japan	Japan Academy Film Prize for Outstanding Performance by an Actor in a Leading Role	Japan Academy Film Prize	
Japan	Mainichi Film Award for Best Actor	Mainichi Film Awards	
Japan	Nikkan Sports Film Award for Best Actor	Nikkan Sports Film Award	
Japan	Tokyo Sports Film Award for Best Actor	Tokyo Sports Film Award	
Macau	Golden Lotus Award for Best Actor	Macau International Movie & Television Festival	
Philippines	Box Office Entertainment Award for Box Office King	Memorial Scholarship Foundation	
Philippines	Box Office Entertainment Award for Phenomenal Box Office Star	Memorial Scholarship Foundation	
Philippines	FAMAS Award for Best Actor	FAMAS Award	
Philippines	Gawad Urian for Best Actor	Filipino Film Critics	
Philippines	Metro Manila Film Festival Award for Best Actor	Metropolitan Manila Development Authority	
Philippines	PMPC Star Award for Movie Actor of the Year	PMPC Star Awards for Movies	
South Korea	Baeksang Arts Awards for Best Actor (Film)	Baeksang Arts Awards	
Taiwan	Golden Horse Award for Best Leading Actor	Golden Horse Film Festival and Awards	
Vietnam	Best Actor Award (Vietnam Film Festival)	Vietnam Film Festival	

== Europe ==
Country	Award	Venue / sponsor	Notes
Europe	European Film Award for Best Actor	European Film Awards	
Belgium	Magritte Award for Best Actor	Académie André Delvaux	
Croatia	Golden Arena for Best Actor	Pula Film Festival	
Czech Republic	Czech Lion Award for Best Actor in Leading Role	Czech Lion Awards	
Czech Republic	Czech Lion Award for Best Actress in Leading Role	Czech Lion Awards	
Denmark	Robert Award for Best Actor in a Leading Role	Danish Film Academy	
Finland	Jussi Award for Best Actor	Jussi Awards	
France	Best Actor Award (Annecy Italian Film Festival)	Annecy Italian Film Festival	Italian films
France	Cannes Film Festival Award for Best Actor	Cannes Film Festival	
France	César Award for Best Actor	Académie des Arts et Techniques du Cinéma	
France	Globe de Cristal Award for Best Actor	Globe de Cristal Awards	
France	Lumière Award for Best Actor	Lumière Awards	
Germany	Bavarian Film Awards (Best Acting)	Bavarian Film Awards	
Germany	Silver Bear for Best Actor	Berlin International Film Festival	
Italy	David di Donatello for Best Actor	Academy of Italian Cinema	
Italy	David di Donatello for Best Foreign Actor	Italian Academy of Films	
Italy	Edda Award for Best Leading Actor or Actress	Academy of Italian Cinema	
Italy	Nastro d'Argento for Best Actor	Italian National Syndicate of Film Journalists	
Italy	Volpi Cup for Best Actor	Venice Film Festival	
Netherlands	Golden Calf for Best Actor	Netherlands Film Festival	
Poland	Polish Academy Award for Best Actor	Polish Film Academy	
Russia	Golden Eagle Award for Best Leading Actor	Golden Eagle Award	
Spain	Goya Award for Best Actor	Goya Awards	
Sweden	Guldbagge Award for Best Actor in a Leading Role	Swedish Film Institute	
United Kingdom	BAFTA Award for Best Actor in a Leading Role	British Academy of Film and Television Arts	
United Kingdom	BIFA for Best Performance by an Actor in a British Independent Film	British Independent Film Awards	
United Kingdom	Empire Award for Best Actor	Empire film magazine	
United Kingdom	Empire Award for Best British Actor	Empire film magazine	
United Kingdom	London Film Critics' Circle Award for Actor of the Year	London Film Critics' Circle	
United Kingdom	London Film Critics' Circle Award for British Actor of the Year	London Film Critics' Circle	

== Oceania ==
Country	Award	Venue / sponsor	Notes
Australia	AACTA Award for Best Actor in a Leading Role	Australian Academy of Cinema and Television Arts	
Australia	AACTA International Award for Best Actor	Australian Academy of Cinema and Television Arts	
Australia	Australian Film Institute International Award for Best Actor	AACTA Awards	

== See also ==
- Best Actor
- Leading actor
- Lists of awards
- Lists of acting awards
- List of awards for male actors
- List of film awards
