= Primetime Emmy Award for Outstanding Lead Actress in a Comedy Series =

Award for lead actress in a television comedy series

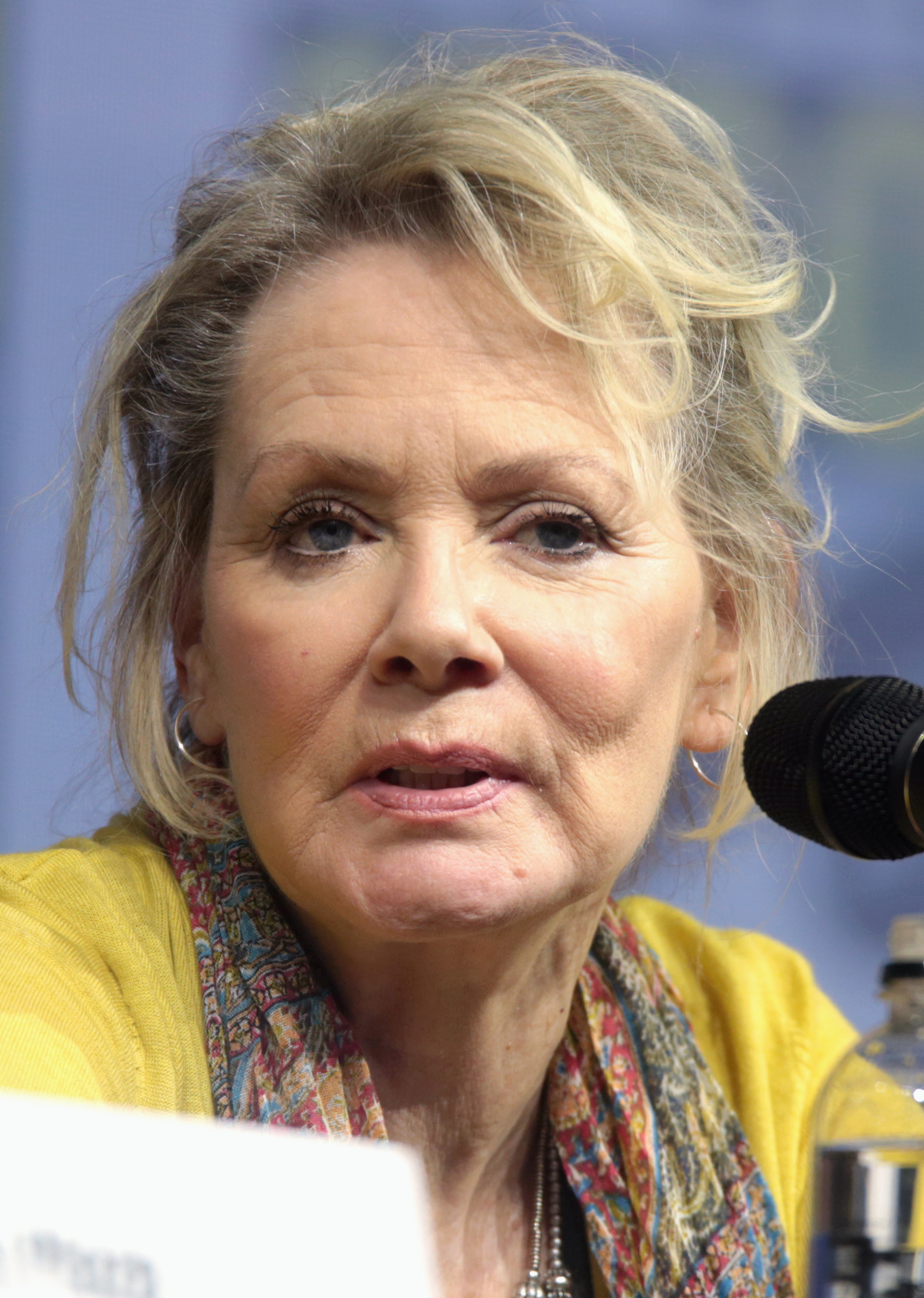
- The 2026 recipient: Jean Smart
- Awarded for: Outstanding Lead Actress in a Comedy Series
- Country: United States
- Presented by: Academy of Television Arts & Sciences
- First award: 1954
- Currently held by: Jean Smart, Hacks (2026)
- Website: emmys.com

This is a list of winners and nominees of the Primetime Emmy Award for Outstanding Lead Actress in a Comedy Series. Beginning with 1966, leading actresses in comedy have competed alone. However, these comedic performances included actresses from miniseries, telefilms, and guest performers competing against main cast competitors. Such instances are marked below:

- # – Indicates a performance in a Miniseries or Television film, prior to the category's creation
- § – Indicates a performance as a guest performer, prior to the category's creation

== Winners and nominations ==
=== 1950s ===
| Year | Actress | Role | Program | Network |
Best Female Star of a Regular Series
| 1954 (6th) (Note: Early Emmy ceremonies did not have genre-specific acting categories) | Eve Arden | Connie Brooks | Our Miss Brooks | CBS |
| 1954 (6th) | Lucille Ball | Lucy Ricardo | I Love Lucy | CBS |
| 1954 (6th) | Imogene Coca | Various characters | Your Show of Shows | NBC |
| 1954 (6th) | Dinah Shore | Herself | The Dinah Shore Show | NBC |
| 1954 (6th) | Loretta Young | Various characters | The Loretta Young Show | NBC |
Best Actress Starring in a Regular Series
| 1955 (7th) | Loretta Young | Various characters | The Loretta Young Show | NBC |
| 1955 (7th) | Gracie Allen | Gracie Allen | The George Burns and Gracie Allen Show | CBS |
| 1955 (7th) | Eve Arden | Connie Brooks | Our Miss Brooks | CBS |
| 1955 (7th) | Lucille Ball | Lucy Ricardo | I Love Lucy | CBS |
| 1955 (7th) | Ann Sothern | Susie McNamara | Private Secretary | CBS |
Best Actress - Continuing Performance
| 1956 (8th) | Lucille Ball | Lucy Ricardo | I Love Lucy | CBS |
| 1956 (8th) | Gracie Allen | Gracie Allen | The George Burns and Gracie Allen Show | CBS |
| 1956 (8th) | Eve Arden | Connie Brooks | Our Miss Brooks | CBS |
| 1956 (8th) | Jean Hagen | Margaret Williams | Make Room for Daddy | ABC |
| 1956 (8th) | Ann Sothern | Susie McNamara | Private Secretary | CBS |
Best Continuing Performance by an Actress
| 1957 (9th) | Loretta Young | Various characters | The Loretta Young Show | NBC |
| 1957 (9th) | Jan Clayton | Ellen Miller | Lassie | CBS |
| 1957 (9th) | Ida Lupino | Various characters | Four Star Playhouse | CBS |
| 1957 (9th) | Peggy Wood | Mama | Mama | CBS |
| 1957 (9th) | Jane Wyman | Various characters | Jane Wyman Theatre | NBC |
Best Continuing Performance by an Actress in a Leading Role in a Dramatic or Comedy Series
| 1958 (10th) | Jane Wyatt | Margaret Anderson | Father Knows Best | NBC |
| 1958 (10th) | Eve Arden | Liza Hammond | The Eve Arden Show | CBS |
| 1958 (10th) | Spring Byington | Lily Ruskin | December Bride | CBS |
| 1958 (10th) | Jan Clayton | Ellen Miller | Lassie | CBS |
| 1958 (10th) | Ida Lupino | Eve Drake | Mr. Adams and Eve | CBS |
Best Actress in a Leading Role (Continuing Character) in a Comedy Series
1959 (11th)
| 1959 (11th) | Jane Wyatt | Margaret Anderson | Father Knows Best | CBS & NBC |
| 1959 (11th) | Gracie Allen | Gracie Allen | The George Burns and Gracie Allen Show | CBS |
| 1959 (11th) | Spring Byington | Lily Ruskin | December Bride | CBS |
| 1959 (11th) | Ida Lupino | Eve Adams | Mr. Adams and Eve | CBS |
| 1959 (11th) | Donna Reed | Donna Stone | The Donna Reed Show | ABC |
| 1959 (11th) | Ann Sothern | Katy O'Connor | The Ann Sothern Show | CBS |

=== 1960s ===
| Year | Actress | Role | Program | Network |
Outstanding Performance by an Actress in a Series (Lead or Support)
| 1960 (12th) | Jane Wyatt | Margaret Anderson | Father Knows Best | CBS |
| 1960 (12th) | Donna Reed | Donna Stone | The Donna Reed Show | ABC |
| 1960 (12th) | Teresa Wright | Margaret Bourke-White | NBC Sunday Showcase | NBC |
| 1960 (12th) | Loretta Young | Various characters | The Loretta Young Show | NBC |
Outstanding Performance by an Actress in a Series (Lead)
| 1961 (13th) | Barbara Stanwyck | Various characters | The Barbara Stanwyck Show | NBC |
| 1961 (13th) | Donna Reed | Donna Stone | The Donna Reed Show | ABC |
| 1961 (13th) | Loretta Young | Various characters | The Loretta Young Show | NBC |
Outstanding Continued Performance by an Actress in a Series (Lead)
| 1962 (14th) | Shirley Booth | Hazel Burke | Hazel | NBC |
| 1962 (14th) | Gertrude Berg | Sarah Green | The Gertrude Berg Show | CBS |
| 1962 (14th) | Donna Reed | Donna Stone | The Donna Reed Show | ABC |
| 1962 (14th) | Mary Stuart | Joanne Gardner | Search for Tomorrow | CBS |
| 1962 (14th) | Cara Williams | Gladys Porter | Pete and Gladys | CBS |
| 1963 (15th) | Shirley Booth | Hazel Burke | Hazel | NBC |
| 1963 (15th) | Lucille Ball | Lucy Carmichael | The Lucy Show | CBS |
| 1963 (15th) | Shirl Conway | Liz Thorpe | The Nurses | CBS |
| 1963 (15th) | Mary Tyler Moore | Laura Petrie | The Dick Van Dyke Show | CBS |
| 1963 (15th) | Irene Ryan | Granny | The Beverly Hillbillies | CBS |
| 1964 (16th) | Mary Tyler Moore | Laura Petrie | The Dick Van Dyke Show | CBS |
| 1964 (16th) | Shirley Booth | Hazel Burke | Hazel | NBC |
| 1964 (16th) | Patty Duke | Cathy Lane | The Patty Duke Show | ABC |
| 1964 (16th) | Irene Ryan | Granny | The Beverly Hillbillies | CBS |
| 1964 (16th) | Inger Stevens | Katy Holstrum | The Farmer's Daughter | ABC |
Outstanding Individual Achievements in Entertainment - Actors and Performers
1965 (17th)
| 1965 (17th) | Leonard Bernstein | Conductor | New York Philharmonic Young People's Concerts with Leonard Bernstein | CBS |
| 1965 (17th) | Lynn Fontanne | Fanny Bowditch Holmes | Hallmark Hall of Fame: "The Magnificent Yankee" | NBC |
| 1965 (17th) | Alfred Lunt | Oliver Wendell Holmes Jr. | Hallmark Hall of Fame: "The Magnificent Yankee" | NBC |
| 1965 (17th) | Barbra Streisand | Herself | My Name Is Barbra | CBS |
| 1965 (17th) | Dick Van Dyke | Rob Petrie | The Dick Van Dyke Show | CBS |
| 1965 (17th) | Julie Andrews | Herself | The Andy Williams Show: "November 30, 1964" | NBC |
| 1965 (17th) | Johnny Carson | Host | The Tonight Show Starring Johnny Carson | NBC |
| 1965 (17th) | Gladys Cooper | Margaret St. Clair | The Rogues | NBC |
| 1965 (17th) | Robert Coote | Timmy St. Clair | The Rogues | NBC |
| 1965 (17th) | Richard Crenna | James Slattery | Slattery's People | CBS |
| 1965 (17th) | Julie Harris | Florence Nightingale | Hallmark Hall of Fame: "The Holy Terror" | NBC |
| 1965 (17th) | Bob Hope | Himself | Chrysler Presents A Bob Hope Comedy Special | NBC |
| 1965 (17th) | Dean Jagger | Principal Albert Vane | Mr. Novak | NBC |
| 1965 (17th) | Danny Kaye | Host | The Danny Kaye Show | CBS |
| 1965 (17th) | David McCallum | Illya Kuryakin | The Man from U.N.C.L.E. | NBC |
| 1965 (17th) | Red Skelton | Himself | The Red Skelton Hour | CBS |
Outstanding Continued Performance by an Actress in a Leading Role in a Comedy Series
1966 (18th)
| 1966 (18th) | Mary Tyler Moore | Laura Petrie | The Dick Van Dyke Show | CBS |
| 1966 (18th) | Lucille Ball | Lucy Carmichael | The Lucy Show | CBS |
| 1966 (18th) | Elizabeth Montgomery | Samantha Stephens | Bewitched | ABC |
1967 (19th)
| 1967 (19th) | Lucille Ball | Lucy Carmichael | The Lucy Show | CBS |
| 1967 (19th) | Elizabeth Montgomery | Samantha Stephens | Bewitched | ABC |
| 1967 (19th) | Agnes Moorehead | Endora | Bewitched | ABC |
| 1967 (19th) | Marlo Thomas | Ann Marie | That Girl | ABC |
1968 (20th)
| 1968 (20th) | Lucille Ball | Lucy Carmichael | The Lucy Show | CBS |
| 1968 (20th) | Barbara Feldon | Agent 99 | Get Smart | NBC |
| 1968 (20th) | Elizabeth Montgomery | Samantha Stephens | Bewitched | ABC |
| 1968 (20th) | Paula Prentiss | Paula Hollister | He & She | CBS |
| 1968 (20th) | Marlo Thomas | Ann Marie | That Girl | ABC |
1969 (21st)
| 1969 (21st) | Hope Lange | Carolyn Muir | The Ghost & Mrs. Muir | NBC |
| 1969 (21st) | Diahann Carroll | Julia Baker | Julia | NBC |
| 1969 (21st) | Barbara Feldon | Agent 99 | Get Smart | NBC |
| 1969 (21st) | Elizabeth Montgomery | Samantha Stephens | Bewitched | ABC |

=== 1970s ===
| Year | Actress | Role | Program | Network |
|---|---|---|---|---|
1970 (22nd)
| 1970 (22nd) | Hope Lange | Carolyn Muir | The Ghost & Mrs. Muir | ABC |
| 1970 (22nd) | Elizabeth Montgomery | Samantha Stephens | Bewitched | ABC |
| 1970 (22nd) | Marlo Thomas | Ann Marie | That Girl | ABC |
1971 (23rd)
| 1971 (23rd) | Jean Stapleton | Edith Bunker | All in the Family | CBS |
| 1971 (23rd) | Marlo Thomas | Ann Marie | That Girl | ABC |
| 1971 (23rd) | Mary Tyler Moore | Mary Richards | The Mary Tyler Moore Show | CBS |
1972 (24th)
| 1972 (24th) | Jean Stapleton | Edith Bunker | All in the Family | CBS |
| 1972 (24th) | Sandy Duncan | Sandy Stockton | Funny Face | CBS |
| 1972 (24th) | Mary Tyler Moore | Mary Richards | The Mary Tyler Moore Show | CBS |
1973 (25th)
| 1973 (25th) | Mary Tyler Moore | Mary Richards | The Mary Tyler Moore Show | CBS |
| 1973 (25th) | Jean Stapleton | Edith Bunker | All in the Family | CBS |
| 1973 (25th) | Bea Arthur | Maude Findlay | Maude | CBS |
1974 (26th)
| 1974 (26th) | Mary Tyler Moore | Mary Richards | The Mary Tyler Moore Show | CBS |
| 1974 (26th) | Bea Arthur | Maude Findlay | Maude | CBS |
| 1974 (26th) | Jean Stapleton | Edith Bunker | All in the Family | CBS |
1975 (27th)
| 1975 (27th) | Valerie Harper | Rhoda Morgenstern | Rhoda | CBS |
| 1975 (27th) | Jean Stapleton | Edith Bunker | All in the Family | CBS |
| 1975 (27th) | Mary Tyler Moore | Mary Richards | The Mary Tyler Moore Show | CBS |
1976 (28th)
| 1976 (28th) | Mary Tyler Moore | Mary Richards | The Mary Tyler Moore Show | CBS |
| 1976 (28th) | Lee Grant | Fay Stewart | Fay | NBC |
| 1976 (28th) | Bea Arthur | Maude Findlay | Maude | CBS |
| 1976 (28th) | Cloris Leachman | Phyllis Lindstrom | Phyllis | CBS |
| 1976 (28th) | Valerie Harper | Rhoda Morgenstern | Rhoda | CBS |
1977 (29th)
| 1977 (29th) | Bea Arthur | Maude Findlay | Maude | CBS |
| 1977 (29th) | Jean Stapleton | Edith Bunker | All in the Family | CBS |
| 1977 (29th) | Valerie Harper | Rhoda Morgenstern | Rhoda | CBS |
| 1977 (29th) | Suzanne Pleshette | Emily Hartley | The Bob Newhart Show | CBS |
| 1977 (29th) | Mary Tyler Moore | Mary Richards | The Mary Tyler Moore Show | CBS |
1978 (30th)
| 1978 (30th) | Jean Stapleton | Edith Bunker | All in the Family | CBS |
| 1978 (30th) | Bea Arthur | Maude Findlay | Maude | CBS |
| 1978 (30th) | Valerie Harper | Rhoda Morgenstern | Rhoda | CBS |
| 1978 (30th) | Cathryn Damon | Mary Campbell | Soap | ABC |
| 1978 (30th) | Katherine Helmond | Jessica Tate | Soap | ABC |
| 1978 (30th) | Suzanne Pleshette | Emily Hartley | The Bob Newhart Show | CBS |
1979 (31st)
| 1979 (31st) | Ruth Gordon § | Dee Wilcox | Taxi | ABC |
| 1979 (31st) | Linda Lavin | Alice Hyatt | Alice | CBS |
| 1979 (31st) | Jean Stapleton | Edith Bunker | All in the Family | CBS |
| 1979 (31st) | Katherine Helmond | Jessica Tate | Soap | ABC |
| 1979 (31st) | Isabel Sanford | Louise Jefferson | The Jeffersons | CBS |

=== 1980s ===
| Year | Actress | Role | Program | Episode Submissions | Network |
|---|---|---|---|---|---|
1980 (32nd)
| 1980 (32nd) | Cathryn Damon | Mary Campbell | Soap | —N/a | ABC |
| 1980 (32nd) | Polly Holliday | Flo Castleberry | Flo | —N/a | CBS |
| 1980 (32nd) | Sheree North § | Dotty Wertz | Archie Bunker's Place | —N/a | CBS |
| 1980 (32nd) | Isabel Sanford | Louise Jefferson | The Jeffersons | —N/a | CBS |
| 1980 (32nd) | Katherine Helmond | Jessica Tate | Soap | —N/a | ABC |
1981 (33rd)
| 1981 (33rd) | Isabel Sanford | Louise Jefferson | The Jeffersons | "And the Doorknobs Shined Like Diamonds" | CBS |
| 1981 (33rd) | Eileen Brennan § | Mrs. McKenzie | Taxi | "Thy Boss's Wife" | ABC |
| 1981 (33rd) | Cathryn Damon | Mary Campbell | Soap | —N/a | ABC |
| 1981 (33rd) | Katherine Helmond | Jessica Tate | Soap | —N/a | ABC |
| 1981 (33rd) | Lynn Redgrave | Ann Atkinson | House Calls | —N/a | CBS |
1982 (34th)
| 1982 (34th) | Carol Kane § | Simka Dahblitz | Taxi | "Simka Returns" | ABC |
| 1982 (34th) | Swoosie Kurtz | Laurie Morgan | Love, Sidney | —N/a | NBC |
| 1982 (34th) | Nell Carter | Nellie Harper | Gimme a Break! | —N/a | NBC |
| 1982 (34th) | Charlotte Rae | Edna Garrett | The Facts of Life | —N/a | NBC |
| 1982 (34th) | Bonnie Franklin | Ann Romano | One Day at a Time | —N/a | CBS |
| 1982 (34th) | Isabel Sanford | Louise Jefferson | The Jeffersons | —N/a | CBS |
1983 (35th)
| 1983 (35th) | Shelley Long | Diane Chambers | Cheers | "Give Me a Ring Sometime" | NBC |
| 1983 (35th) | Mariette Hartley | Jennifer Barnes | Goodnight, Beantown | —N/a | CBS |
| 1983 (35th) | Isabel Sanford | Louise Jefferson | The Jeffersons | —N/a | CBS |
| 1983 (35th) | Nell Carter | Nellie Harper | Gimme a Break! | —N/a | NBC |
| 1983 (35th) | Swoosie Kurtz | Laurie Morgan | Love, Sidney | —N/a | NBC |
| 1983 (35th) | Rita Moreno | Violet Newstead | 9 to 5 | —N/a | ABC |
1984 (36th)
| 1984 (36th) | Jane Curtin | Allie Lowell | Kate & Allie | —N/a | CBS |
| 1984 (36th) | Joanna Cassidy | Jo Jo White | Buffalo Bill | —N/a | NBC |
| 1984 (36th) | Shelley Long | Diane Chambers | Cheers | —N/a | NBC |
| 1984 (36th) | Susan Saint James | Kate McArdle | Kate & Allie | —N/a | CBS |
| 1984 (36th) | Isabel Sanford | Louise Jefferson | The Jeffersons | —N/a | CBS |
1985 (37th)
| 1985 (37th) | Jane Curtin | Allie Lowell | Kate & Allie | —N/a | CBS |
| 1985 (37th) | Shelley Long | Diane Chambers | Cheers | —N/a | NBC |
| 1985 (37th) | Phylicia Rashad | Clair Huxtable | The Cosby Show | —N/a | NBC |
| 1985 (37th) | Susan Saint James | Kate McArdle | Kate & Allie | —N/a | CBS |
| 1985 (37th) | Isabel Sanford | Louise Jefferson | The Jeffersons | —N/a | CBS |
1986 (38th)
| 1986 (38th) | Betty White | Rose Nylund | The Golden Girls | "In a Bed of Rose's" | NBC |
| 1986 (38th) | Shelley Long | Diane Chambers | Cheers | —N/a | NBC |
| 1986 (38th) | Bea Arthur | Dorothy Zbornak | The Golden Girls | "The Triangle" | NBC |
| 1986 (38th) | Rue McClanahan | Blanche Devereaux | The Golden Girls | "The Way We Met" | NBC |
| 1986 (38th) | Phylicia Rashad | Clair Huxtable | The Cosby Show | "Cliff in Love" | NBC |
1987 (39th)
| 1987 (39th) | Rue McClanahan | Blanche Devereaux | The Golden Girls | "End of the Curse" | NBC |
| 1987 (39th) | Blair Brown | Molly Bickford Dodd | The Days and Nights of Molly Dodd | —N/a | NBC |
| 1987 (39th) | Bea Arthur | Dorothy Zbornak | The Golden Girls | "The Stan Who Came to Dinner" | NBC |
| 1987 (39th) | Betty White | Rose Nylund | The Golden Girls | "Isn't It Romantic?" | NBC |
| 1987 (39th) | Jane Curtin | Allie Lowell | Kate & Allie | —N/a | CBS |
1988 (40th)
| 1988 (40th) | Bea Arthur | Dorothy Zbornak | The Golden Girls | "My Brother, My Father" | NBC |
| 1988 (40th) | Kirstie Alley | Rebecca Howe | Cheers | "Backseat Becky, Upfront" | NBC |
| 1988 (40th) | Blair Brown | Molly Bickford Dodd | The Days and Nights of Molly Dodd | —N/a | NBC |
| 1988 (40th) | Rue McClanahan | Blanche Devereaux | The Golden Girls | "Strange Bedfellows" | NBC |
| 1988 (40th) | Betty White | Rose Nylund | The Golden Girls | "Bringing Up Baby" | NBC |
1989 (41st)
| 1989 (41st) | Candice Bergen | Murphy Brown | Murphy Brown | "Respect" | CBS |
| 1989 (41st) | Blair Brown | Molly Bickford Dodd | The Days and Nights of Molly Dodd | —N/a | Lifetime |
| 1989 (41st) | Rue McClanahan | Blanche Devereaux | The Golden Girls | "Yes, We Have No Havanas" | NBC |
| 1989 (41st) | Betty White | Rose Nylund | The Golden Girls | "High Anxiety" | NBC |
| 1989 (41st) | Bea Arthur | Dorothy Zbornak | The Golden Girls | "Love Me Tender" | NBC |

=== 1990s ===
| Year | Actress | Role | Program | Episode Submissions | Network |
|---|---|---|---|---|---|
1990 (42nd)
| 1990 (42nd) | Candice Bergen | Murphy Brown | Murphy Brown | "Brown Like Me" | CBS |
| 1990 (42nd) | Kirstie Alley | Rebecca Howe | Cheers | "The Improbable Dream, Part 1" | NBC |
| 1990 (42nd) | Betty White | Rose Nylund | The Golden Girls | "Rose Fights Back" | NBC |
| 1990 (42nd) | Blair Brown | Molly Bickford Dodd | The Days and Nights of Molly Dodd | —N/a | Lifetime |
| 1990 (42nd) | Delta Burke | Suzanne Sugarbaker | Designing Women | "They Shoot Fat Women, Don't They?" | CBS |
1991 (43rd)
| 1991 (43rd) | Kirstie Alley | Rebecca Howe | Cheers | "The Days of Wine and Neuroses" | NBC |
| 1991 (43rd) | Candice Bergen | Murphy Brown | Murphy Brown | "On Another Plane" | CBS |
| 1991 (43rd) | Delta Burke | Suzanne Sugarbaker | Designing Women | "The Bachelor Auction" | CBS |
| 1991 (43rd) | Blair Brown | Molly Bickford Dodd | The Days and Nights of Molly Dodd | "Here's a Pregnant Pause" | Lifetime |
| 1991 (43rd) | Betty White | Rose Nylund | The Golden Girls | "Once, in St. Olaf" | NBC |
1992 (44th)
| 1992 (44th) | Candice Bergen | Murphy Brown | Murphy Brown | "Birth 101" | CBS |
| 1992 (44th) | Roseanne Barr | Roseanne Conner | Roseanne | "A Bitter Pill to Swallow" | ABC |
| 1992 (44th) | Kirstie Alley | Rebecca Howe | Cheers | "An Old Fashioned Wedding" | NBC |
| 1992 (44th) | Tyne Daly § | Mimsy Borogroves | Wings | "My Brother's Keeper" | NBC |
| 1992 (44th) | Betty White | Rose Nylund | The Golden Girls | "Dateline: Miami" | NBC |
| 1992 (44th) | Marion Ross | Sophie Berger | Brooklyn Bridge | "Brave New World" | CBS |
1993 (45th)
| 1993 (45th) | Roseanne Barr | Roseanne Conner | Roseanne | "Wait Till Your Father Gets Home" | ABC |
| 1993 (45th) | Candice Bergen | Murphy Brown | Murphy Brown | "Games Mothers Play" | CBS |
| 1993 (45th) | Marion Ross | Sophie Berger | Brooklyn Bridge | "Brave New Worlds" | CBS |
| 1993 (45th) | Kirstie Alley | Rebecca Howe | Cheers | "One for the Road" | NBC |
| 1993 (45th) | Helen Hunt | Jamie Buchman | Mad About You | "Pilot" | NBC |
1994 (46th)
| 1994 (46th) | Candice Bergen | Murphy Brown | Murphy Brown | "It's Just Like Riding a Bike" | CBS |
| 1994 (46th) | Helen Hunt | Jamie Buchman | Mad About You | "Cold Feet" | NBC |
| 1994 (46th) | Annie Potts | Dana Palladino | Love & War | "I've Got a Crush on You" | CBS |
| 1994 (46th) | Roseanne Barr | Roseanne Conner | Roseanne | "The Driver's Seat" | ABC |
| 1994 (46th) | Patricia Richardson | Jill Taylor | Home Improvement | "The Colonel" | ABC |
1995 (47th)
| 1995 (47th) | Candice Bergen | Murphy Brown | Murphy Brown | "Requiem for a Crew Guy" | CBS |
| 1995 (47th) | Roseanne Barr | Roseanne Conner | Roseanne | "Thanksgiving 1994" | ABC |
| 1995 (47th) | Ellen DeGeneres | Ellen Morgan | Ellen | "The Spa" | ABC |
| 1995 (47th) | Helen Hunt | Jamie Buchman | Mad About You | "The Ride Home" | NBC |
| 1995 (47th) | Cybill Shepherd | Cybill Sheridan | Cybill | "Virgin, Mother, Crone" | CBS |
1996 (48th)
| 1996 (48th) | Helen Hunt | Jamie Buchman | Mad About You | "The Finale" | NBC |
| 1996 (48th) | Ellen DeGeneres | Ellen Morgan | Ellen | "Witness" | ABC |
| 1996 (48th) | Fran Drescher | Fran Fine | The Nanny | "The Hockey Show" | CBS |
| 1996 (48th) | Cybill Shepherd | Cybill Sheridan | Cybill | "When You're Hot, You're Hot" | CBS |
| 1996 (48th) | Patricia Richardson | Jill Taylor | Home Improvement | "The Longest Day" | ABC |
1997 (49th)
| 1997 (49th) | Helen Hunt | Jamie Buchman | Mad About You | "The Birth" | NBC |
| 1997 (49th) | Ellen DeGeneres | Ellen Morgan | Ellen | "The Puppy Episode" | ABC |
| 1997 (49th) | Patricia Richardson | Jill Taylor | Home Improvement | "Family Unties" | ABC |
| 1997 (49th) | Fran Drescher | Fran Fine | The Nanny | "The Facts of Lice" | CBS |
| 1997 (49th) | Cybill Shepherd | Cybill Sheridan | Cybill | "In Her Dreams" | CBS |
1998 (50th)
| 1998 (50th) | Helen Hunt | Jamie Buchman | Mad About You | "Moody Blues" | NBC |
| 1998 (50th) | Ellen DeGeneres | Ellen Morgan | Ellen | "Neighbors" | ABC |
| 1998 (50th) | Jenna Elfman | Dharma Montgomery | Dharma & Greg | "Haus Arrest" | ABC |
| 1998 (50th) | Patricia Richardson | Jill Taylor | Home Improvement | "Bright Christmas" | ABC |
| 1998 (50th) | Kirstie Alley | Veronica Chase | Veronica's Closet | "Pilot" | NBC |
| 1998 (50th) | Calista Flockhart | Ally McBeal | Ally McBeal | "One Hundred Tears Away" | Fox |
1999 (51st)
| 1999 (51st) | Helen Hunt | Jamie Buchman | Mad About You | "The Final Frontier" | NBC |
| 1999 (51st) | Jenna Elfman | Dharma Montgomery | Dharma & Greg | "Are You Ready for Some Football?" | ABC |
| 1999 (51st) | Calista Flockhart | Ally McBeal | Ally McBeal | "Sideshow" | Fox |
| 1999 (51st) | Patricia Heaton | Debra Barone | Everybody Loves Raymond | "Be Nice" | CBS |
| 1999 (51st) | Sarah Jessica Parker | Carrie Bradshaw | Sex and the City | "The Drought" | HBO |

=== 2000s ===
| Year | Actress | Role | Program | Episode Submissions | Network |
|---|---|---|---|---|---|
2000 (52nd)
| 2000 (52nd) | Patricia Heaton | Debra Barone | Everybody Loves Raymond | "Bad Moon Rising" | CBS |
| 2000 (52nd) | Jenna Elfman | Dharma Montgomery | Dharma & Greg | "Lawyers, Beer, and Money" | ABC |
| 2000 (52nd) | Jane Kaczmarek | Lois | Malcolm in the Middle | "Red Dress" | Fox |
| 2000 (52nd) | Debra Messing | Grace Adler | Will & Grace | "Das Boob" | NBC |
| 2000 (52nd) | Sarah Jessica Parker | Carrie Bradshaw | Sex and the City | "Ex and the City" | HBO |
2001 (53rd)
| 2001 (53rd) | Patricia Heaton | Debra Barone | Everybody Loves Raymond | "The Canister" | CBS |
| 2001 (53rd) | Calista Flockhart | Ally McBeal | Ally McBeal | "Falling Up" | Fox |
| 2001 (53rd) | Jane Kaczmarek | Lois | Malcolm in the Middle | "Flashback" | Fox |
| 2001 (53rd) | Debra Messing | Grace Adler | Will & Grace | "Lows in the Mid-Eighties" | NBC |
| 2001 (53rd) | Sarah Jessica Parker | Carrie Bradshaw | Sex and the City | "Don't Ask, Don't Tell" | HBO |
2002 (54th)
| 2002 (54th) | Jennifer Aniston | Rachel Green | Friends | "The One Where Rachel Has a Baby" | NBC |
| 2002 (54th) | Patricia Heaton | Debra Barone | Everybody Loves Raymond | "A Vote for Debra" | CBS |
| 2002 (54th) | Jane Kaczmarek | Lois | Malcolm in the Middle | "Poker" | Fox |
| 2002 (54th) | Debra Messing | Grace Adler | Will & Grace | "Bed, Bath and Beyond" | NBC |
| 2002 (54th) | Sarah Jessica Parker | Carrie Bradshaw | Sex and the City | "The Real Me" | HBO |
2003 (55th)
| 2003 (55th) | Debra Messing | Grace Adler | Will & Grace | "The Kid Stays Out of the Picture" | NBC |
| 2003 (55th) | Jennifer Aniston | Rachel Green | Friends | "The One Where Monica Sings" | NBC |
| 2003 (55th) | Patricia Heaton | Debra Barone | Everybody Loves Raymond | "Baggage" | CBS |
| 2003 (55th) | Jane Kaczmarek | Lois | Malcolm in the Middle | "Baby" | Fox |
| 2003 (55th) | Sarah Jessica Parker | Carrie Bradshaw | Sex and the City | "Anchors Away" | HBO |
2004 (56th)
| 2004 (56th) | Sarah Jessica Parker | Carrie Bradshaw | Sex and the City | "An American Girl in Paris (Part Deux)" | HBO |
| 2004 (56th) | Jennifer Aniston | Rachel Green | Friends | "The One with Rachel's Going Away Party" | NBC |
| 2004 (56th) | Patricia Heaton | Debra Barone | Everybody Loves Raymond | "Fun with Debra" | CBS |
| 2004 (56th) | Bonnie Hunt | Bonnie Malloy | Life with Bonnie | "Ironing Out Our Differences" | ABC |
| 2004 (56th) | Jane Kaczmarek | Lois | Malcolm in the Middle | "Block Party" | Fox |
2005 (57th)
| 2005 (57th) | Felicity Huffman | Lynette Scavo | Desperate Housewives | "Pilot" | ABC |
| 2005 (57th) | Marcia Cross | Bree Van de Kamp | Desperate Housewives | "Running to Stand Still" | ABC |
| 2005 (57th) | Teri Hatcher | Susan Mayer | Desperate Housewives | "Move On" | ABC |
| 2005 (57th) | Patricia Heaton | Debra Barone | Everybody Loves Raymond | "The Finale" | CBS |
| 2005 (57th) | Jane Kaczmarek | Lois | Malcolm in the Middle | "Lois Battles Jamie" | Fox |
2006 (58th)
| 2006 (58th) | Julia Louis-Dreyfus | Christine Campbell | The New Adventures of Old Christine | "Supertramp" | CBS |
| 2006 (58th) | Stockard Channing | Lydia Barnes | Out of Practice | "And I'll Cry If I Want To" | CBS |
| 2006 (58th) | Jane Kaczmarek | Lois | Malcolm in the Middle | "Lois Strikes Back" | Fox |
| 2006 (58th) | Lisa Kudrow | Valerie Cherish | The Comeback | "Valerie Does Another Classic Leno" | HBO |
| 2006 (58th) | Debra Messing | Grace Adler | Will & Grace | "The Finale" | NBC |
2007 (59th)
| 2007 (59th) | America Ferrera | Betty Suarez | Ugly Betty | "Pilot" | ABC |
| 2007 (59th) | Tina Fey | Liz Lemon | 30 Rock | "Up All Night" | NBC |
| 2007 (59th) | Felicity Huffman | Lynette Scavo | Desperate Housewives | "Bang" | ABC |
| 2007 (59th) | Julia Louis-Dreyfus | Christine Campbell | The New Adventures of Old Christine | "Playdate with Destiny" | CBS |
| 2007 (59th) | Mary-Louise Parker | Nancy Botwin | Weeds | "Mrs. Botwin's Neighborhood" | Showtime |
2008 (60th)
| 2008 (60th) | Tina Fey | Liz Lemon | 30 Rock | "Sandwich Day" | NBC |
| 2008 (60th) | Christina Applegate | Samantha Newly | Samantha Who? | "The Restraining Order" | ABC |
| 2008 (60th) | America Ferrera | Betty Suarez | Ugly Betty | "Odor in the Court" | ABC |
| 2008 (60th) | Julia Louis-Dreyfus | Christine Campbell | The New Adventures of Old Christine | "One and a Half Men" | CBS |
| 2008 (60th) | Mary-Louise Parker | Nancy Botwin | Weeds | "Bill Sussman" | Showtime |
2009 (61st)
| 2009 (61st) | Toni Collette | Tara Gregson | United States of Tara | "Pilot" | Showtime |
| 2009 (61st) | Christina Applegate | Samantha Newly | Samantha Who? | "The Pill" | ABC |
| 2009 (61st) | Tina Fey | Liz Lemon | 30 Rock | "Reunion" | NBC |
| 2009 (61st) | Julia Louis-Dreyfus | Christine Campbell | The New Adventures of Old Christine | "Everyone Says I Love You Except Richie" | CBS |
| 2009 (61st) | Mary-Louise Parker | Nancy Botwin | Weeds | "Lady's a Charm" | Showtime |
| 2009 (61st) | Sarah Silverman | Sarah Silverman | The Sarah Silverman Program | "There's No Place Like Homeless" | Comedy Central |

=== 2010s ===
| Year | Actress | Role | Program | Episode Submissions | Network |
|---|---|---|---|---|---|
2010 (62nd)
| 2010 (62nd) | Edie Falco | Jackie Peyton | Nurse Jackie | "Pilot" | Showtime |
| 2010 (62nd) | Tina Fey | Liz Lemon | 30 Rock | "Dealbreakers Talk Show#0001" | NBC |
| 2010 (62nd) | Amy Poehler | Leslie Knope | Parks and Recreation | "Telethon" | NBC |
| 2010 (62nd) | Toni Collette | Tara Gregson | United States of Tara | "Torando!" | Showtime |
| 2010 (62nd) | Julia Louis-Dreyfus | Christine Campbell | The New Adventures of Old Christine | "I Love What You Do for Me" | CBS |
| 2010 (62nd) | Lea Michele | Rachel Berry | Glee | "Sectionals" | Fox |
2011 (63rd)
| 2011 (63rd) | Melissa McCarthy | Molly Flynn | Mike & Molly | "First Date" | CBS |
| 2011 (63rd) | Edie Falco | Jackie Peyton | Nurse Jackie | "Rat Falls" | Showtime |
| 2011 (63rd) | Tina Fey | Liz Lemon | 30 Rock | "Double-Edged Sword" | NBC |
| 2011 (63rd) | Laura Linney | Cathy Jamison | The Big C | "Pilot" | Showtime |
| 2011 (63rd) | Martha Plimpton | Virginia Chance | Raising Hope | "Say Cheese" | Fox |
| 2011 (63rd) | Amy Poehler | Leslie Knope | Parks and Recreation | "Flu Season" | NBC |
2012 (64th)
| 2012 (64th) | Julia Louis-Dreyfus | Selina Meyer | Veep | "Tears" | HBO |
| 2012 (64th) | Zooey Deschanel | Jessica Day | New Girl | "Bad in Bed" | Fox |
| 2012 (64th) | Lena Dunham | Hannah Horvath | Girls | "She Did" | HBO |
| 2012 (64th) | Edie Falco | Jackie Peyton | Nurse Jackie | "Disneyland Sucks" | Showtime |
| 2012 (64th) | Tina Fey | Liz Lemon | 30 Rock | "The Tuxedo Begins" | NBC |
| 2012 (64th) | Melissa McCarthy | Molly Flynn | Mike & Molly | "The Dress" | CBS |
| 2012 (64th) | Amy Poehler | Leslie Knope | Parks and Recreation | "Win, Lose, or Draw" | NBC |
2013 (65th)
| 2013 (65th) | Julia Louis-Dreyfus | Selina Meyer | Veep | "Running" | HBO |
| 2013 (65th) | Laura Dern | Amy Jellicoe | Enlightened | "All I Ever Wanted" | HBO |
| 2013 (65th) | Lena Dunham | Hannah Horvath | Girls | "Bad Friend" | HBO |
| 2013 (65th) | Edie Falco | Jackie Peyton | Nurse Jackie | "Luck of the Drawing" | Showtime |
| 2013 (65th) | Tina Fey | Liz Lemon | 30 Rock | "Hogcock!" + "Last Lunch" | NBC |
| 2013 (65th) | Amy Poehler | Leslie Knope | Parks and Recreation | "Emergency Response" + "Leslie and Ben" | NBC |
2014 (66th)
| 2014 (66th) | Julia Louis-Dreyfus | Selina Meyer | Veep | "Crate" | HBO |
| 2014 (66th) | Lena Dunham | Hannah Horvath | Girls | "Beach House" | HBO |
| 2014 (66th) | Edie Falco | Jackie Peyton | Nurse Jackie | "Super Greens" | Showtime |
| 2014 (66th) | Melissa McCarthy | Molly Flynn | Mike & Molly | "Mind Over Molly" | CBS |
| 2014 (66th) | Amy Poehler | Leslie Knope | Parks and Recreation | "Recall Vote" | NBC |
| 2014 (66th) | Taylor Schilling | Piper Chapman | Orange Is the New Black | "The Chickening" | Netflix |
2015 (67th)
| 2015 (67th) | Julia Louis-Dreyfus | Selina Meyer | Veep | "Election Night" | HBO |
| 2015 (67th) | Edie Falco | Jackie Peyton | Nurse Jackie | "I Say a Little Prayer" | Showtime |
| 2015 (67th) | Lisa Kudrow | Valerie Cherish | The Comeback | "Valerie Is Taken Seriously" | HBO |
| 2015 (67th) | Amy Poehler | Leslie Knope | Parks and Recreation | "One Last Ride" | NBC |
| 2015 (67th) | Amy Schumer | Various characters | Inside Amy Schumer | "Cool With It" | Comedy Central |
| 2015 (67th) | Lily Tomlin | Frankie Bergstein | Grace and Frankie | "The Vows" | Netflix |
2016 (68th)
| 2016 (68th) | Julia Louis-Dreyfus | Selina Meyer | Veep | "Mother" | HBO |
| 2016 (68th) | Ellie Kemper | Kimmy Schmidt | Unbreakable Kimmy Schmidt | "Kimmy Goes to a Hotel!" | Netflix |
| 2016 (68th) | Laurie Metcalf | Dr. Jenna James | Getting On | "Am I Still Me?" | HBO |
| 2016 (68th) | Tracee Ellis Ross | Dr. Rainbow Johnson | Black-ish | "Sink or Swim" | ABC |
| 2016 (68th) | Amy Schumer | Various characters | Inside Amy Schumer | "Welcome to the Gun Show" | Comedy Central |
| 2016 (68th) | Lily Tomlin | Frankie Bergstein | Grace and Frankie | "The Test" | Netflix |
2017 (69th)
| 2017 (69th) | Julia Louis-Dreyfus | Selina Meyer | Veep | "Groundbreaking" | HBO |
| 2017 (69th) | Pamela Adlon | Sam Fox | Better Things | "Future Fever" | FX |
| 2017 (69th) | Allison Janney | Bonnie Plunkett | Mom | "Tush Push and Some Radishes" | CBS |
| 2017 (69th) | Ellie Kemper | Kimmy Schmidt | Unbreakable Kimmy Schmidt | "Kimmy Goes to College!" | Netflix |
| 2017 (69th) | Jane Fonda | Grace Hanson | Grace and Frankie | "The Pot" | Netflix |
| 2017 (69th) | Tracee Ellis Ross | Dr. Rainbow Johnson | Black-ish | "Being Bow-racial" | ABC |
| 2017 (69th) | Lily Tomlin | Frankie Bergstein | Grace and Frankie | "The Burglary" | Netflix |
2018 (70th)
| 2018 (70th) | Rachel Brosnahan | Miriam "Midge" Maisel | The Marvelous Mrs. Maisel | "Thank You and Good Night" | Amazon |
| 2018 (70th) | Pamela Adlon | Sam Fox | Better Things | "Eulogy" | FX |
| 2018 (70th) | Allison Janney | Bonnie Plunkett | Mom | "Phone Confetti and a Wee Dingle" | CBS |
| 2018 (70th) | Issa Rae | Issa Dee | Insecure | "Hella Great" | HBO |
| 2018 (70th) | Tracee Ellis Ross | Dr. Rainbow Johnson | Black-ish | "Elder. Scam." | ABC |
| 2018 (70th) | Lily Tomlin | Frankie Bergstein | Grace and Frankie | "The Home" | Netflix |
2019 (71st)
| 2019 (71st) | Phoebe Waller-Bridge | Fleabag | Fleabag | "Episode 1" | Amazon |
| 2019 (71st) | Christina Applegate | Jen Harding | Dead to Me | "I've Gotta Get Away" | Netflix |
| 2019 (71st) | Rachel Brosnahan | Miriam "Midge" Maisel | The Marvelous Mrs. Maisel | "Midnight at the Concord" | Amazon |
| 2019 (71st) | Julia Louis-Dreyfus | Selina Meyer | Veep | "Veep" | HBO |
| 2019 (71st) | Natasha Lyonne | Nadia Vulvokov | Russian Doll | "Nothing in This World Is Easy" | Netflix |
| 2019 (71st) | Catherine O'Hara | Moira Rose | Schitt's Creek | "The Crowening" | Pop TV |

=== 2020s ===
| Year | Actress | Role | Program | Episode Submission | Network |
|---|---|---|---|---|---|
2020 (72nd)
| 2020 (72nd) | Catherine O'Hara | Moira Rose | Schitt's Creek | "The Incident" | Pop TV |
| 2020 (72nd) | Christina Applegate | Jen Harding | Dead to Me | "It's Not You, It's Me" | Netflix |
| 2020 (72nd) | Rachel Brosnahan | Miriam "Midge" Maisel | The Marvelous Mrs. Maisel | "A Jewish Girl Walks Into the Apollo..." | Amazon |
| 2020 (72nd) | Linda Cardellini | Judy Hale | Dead to Me | "If Only You Knew" | Netflix |
| 2020 (72nd) | Issa Rae | Issa Dee | Insecure | "Lowkey Happy" | HBO |
| 2020 (72nd) | Tracee Ellis Ross | Dr. Rainbow Johnson | Black-ish | "Kid Life Crisis" | ABC |
2021 (73rd)
| 2021 (73rd) | Jean Smart | Deborah Vance | Hacks | "1.69 Million" | HBO Max |
| 2021 (73rd) | Aidy Bryant | Annie Easton | Shrill | "Ranchers" | Hulu |
| 2021 (73rd) | Kaley Cuoco | Cassie Bowden | The Flight Attendant | "In Case of Emergency" | HBO Max |
| 2021 (73rd) | Allison Janney | Bonnie Plunkett | Mom | "My Kinda People and the Big To-Do" | CBS |
| 2021 (73rd) | Tracee Ellis Ross | Dr. Rainbow Johnson | Black-ish | "Babes in Boyland" | ABC |
2022 (74th)
| 2022 (74th) | Jean Smart | Deborah Vance | Hacks | "The Click" | HBO Max |
| 2022 (74th) | Rachel Brosnahan | Miriam "Midge" Maisel | The Marvelous Mrs. Maisel | "How Do You Get to Carnegie Hall?" | Prime Video |
| 2022 (74th) | Quinta Brunson | Janine Teagues | Abbott Elementary | "Pilot" | ABC |
| 2022 (74th) | Kaley Cuoco | Cassie Bowden | The Flight Attendant | "Drowning Women" | HBO Max |
| 2022 (74th) | Elle Fanning | Catherine the Great | The Great | "Alone at Last" | Hulu |
| 2022 (74th) | Issa Rae | Issa Dee | Insecure | "Reunited, Okay?!" | HBO |
2023 (75th)
| 2023 (75th) | Quinta Brunson | Janine Teagues | Abbott Elementary | "Teacher Conference" | ABC |
| 2023 (75th) | Christina Applegate | Jen Harding | Dead to Me | "We've Reached the End" | Netflix |
| 2023 (75th) | Rachel Brosnahan | Miriam "Midge" Maisel | The Marvelous Mrs. Maisel | "Four Minutes" | Prime Video |
| 2023 (75th) | Natasha Lyonne | Charlie Cale | Poker Face | "Dead Man's Hand" | Peacock |
| 2023 (75th) | Jenna Ortega | Wednesday Addams / Goody Addams | Wednesday | "Friend or Woe" | Netflix |
2024 (76th)
| 2024 (76th) | Jean Smart | Deborah Vance | Hacks | "Yes, And" | Max |
| 2024 (76th) | Quinta Brunson | Janine Teagues | Abbott Elementary | "Party" | ABC |
| 2024 (76th) | Ayo Edebiri | Sydney Adamu | The Bear | "Sundae" | FX |
| 2024 (76th) | Selena Gomez | Mabel Mora | Only Murders in the Building | "Ghost Light" | Hulu |
| 2024 (76th) | Maya Rudolph | Molly Novak | Loot | "Space for Everyone" | Apple TV+ |
| 2024 (76th) | Kristen Wiig | Maxine Dellacorte-Simmons | Palm Royale | "Maxine Throws a Party" | Apple TV+ |
2025 (77th)
| 2025 (77th) | Jean Smart | Deborah Vance | Hacks | "I Love L.A." | HBO Max |
| 2025 (77th) | Uzo Aduba | Cordelia Cupp | The Residence | "The Mystery of the Yellow Room" | Netflix |
| 2025 (77th) | Kristen Bell | Joanne | Nobody Wants This | "Pilot" | Netflix |
| 2025 (77th) | Quinta Brunson | Janine Teagues | Abbott Elementary | "Strike" | ABC |
| 2025 (77th) | Ayo Edebiri | Sydney Adamu | The Bear | "Legacy" | FX |
2026 (78th)
| 2026 (78th) | Jean Smart | Deborah Vance | Hacks | "Hacks" | HBO Max |
| 2026 (78th) | Quinta Brunson | Janine Teagues | Abbott Elementary | "Night Out" | ABC |
| 2026 (78th) | Ayo Edebiri | Sydney Adamu | The Bear | "Worms" | FX |
| 2026 (78th) | Elle Fanning | Margo Millet | Margo's Got Money Troubles | "Lock and Load" | Apple TV |
| 2026 (78th) | Lisa Kudrow | Valerie Cherish | The Comeback | "Valerie Faces Reality" | HBO |

== Superlatives ==
| Superlative | Outstanding Lead Actress in a Comedy Series |
|---|---|
| Actress with most awards | Julia Louis-Dreyfus (7) |
| Actress with most nominations | Julia Louis-Dreyfus (12) |
| Actress with most nominations without ever winning | Jane Kaczmarek (7) |

== Programs with multiple wins ==
6 wins

- Veep

5 wins

- Hacks
- Murphy Brown

4 wins

- Mad About You

3 wins

- All in the Family
- Father Knows Best
- The Golden Girls
- The Mary Tyler Moore Show

2 wins

- Cheers
- The Dick Van Dyke Show
- Everybody Loves Raymond
- The Ghost & Mrs. Muir
- Hazel
- Kate & Allie
- The Lucy Show
- Taxi

== Performers with multiple wins ==
7 wins

- Julia Louis-Dreyfus (6 consecutive)

5 wins

- Candice Bergen (2 consecutive twice)
- Mary Tyler Moore (2 consecutive twice)
- Jean Smart (2 & 3 consecutive)

4 wins

- Helen Hunt (consecutive)

3 wins

- Lucille Ball (2 consecutive)
- Jean Stapleton (2 consecutive)
- Jane Wyatt (consecutive)

2 wins

- Bea Arthur
- Shirley Booth (consecutive)
- Jane Curtin (consecutive)
- Patricia Heaton (consecutive)
- Hope Lange (consecutive)

== Programs with multiple nominations ==
15 nominations

- The Golden Girls

9 nominations

- Cheers

8 nominations

- All in the Family

7 nominations

- 30 Rock
- Everybody Loves Raymond
- The Jeffersons
- Mad About You
- Malcolm in the Middle
- The Mary Tyler Moore Show
- Murphy Brown
- Soap
- Veep

6 nominations

- Bewitched
- Nurse Jackie
- Parks and Recreation
- Sex and the City

5 nominations

- Abbott Elementary
- Black-ish
- The Days and Nights of Molly Dodd
- Grace and Frankie
- Hacks
- Kate & Allie
- The Marvelous Mrs. Maisel
- Maude
- The New Adventures of Old Christine
- Will & Grace

4 nominations

- Dead to Me
- Desperate Housewives
- The Donna Reed Show
- Ellen
- The George Burns and Gracie Allen Show
- Home Improvement
- I Love Lucy
- The Loretta Young Show
- The Lucy Show
- Rhoda
- Roseanne
- That Girl

3 nominations

- Ally McBeal
- The Bear
- The Comeback
- Cybill
- Dharma & Greg
- The Dick Van Dyke Show
- Father Knows Best
- Friends
- Girls
- Hazel
- Insecure
- Mike & Molly
- Mom
- Our Miss Brooks
- Private Secretary
- Taxi
- Weeds

2 nominations

- Better Things
- The Beverly Hillbillies
- The Bob Newhart Show
- Brooklyn Bridge
- The Cosby Show
- December Bride
- Designing Women
- The Flight Attendant
- Get Smart
- The Ghost & Mrs. Muir
- Gimme a Break!
- Inside Amy Schumer
- Love, Sidney
- Mr. Adams and Eve
- The Nanny
- Samantha Who?
- Schitt's Creek
- Ugly Betty
- Unbreakable Kimmy Schmidt
- United States of Tara

== Performers with multiple nominations ==
12 nominations

- Julia Louis-Dreyfus

10 nominations

- Mary Tyler Moore

9 nominations

- Bea Arthur

8 nominations

- Lucille Ball
- Jean Stapleton

7 nominations

- Candice Bergen
- Tina Fey
- Patricia Heaton
- Helen Hunt
- Jane Kaczmarek
- Isabel Sanford
- Betty White

6 nominations

- Kirstie Alley
- Edie Falco
- Sarah Jessica Parker
- Amy Poehler

5 nominations

- Christina Applegate
- Rachel Brosnahan
- Blair Brown
- Quinta Brunson
- Debra Messing
- Elizabeth Montgomery
- Tracee Ellis Ross
- Jean Smart

4 nominations

- Gracie Allen
- Eve Arden
- Roseanne Barr
- Ellen DeGeneres
- Valerie Harper
- Katherine Helmond
- Shelley Long
- Rue McClanahan
- Donna Reed
- Patricia Richardson
- Ann Sothern
- Marlo Thomas
- Lily Tomlin
- Loretta Young

3 nominations

- Jennifer Aniston
- Shirley Booth
- Jane Curtin
- Cathryn Damon
- Lena Dunham
- Ayo Edebiri
- Jenna Elfman
- Calista Flockhart
- Allison Janney
- Lisa Kudrow
- Melissa McCarthy
- Mary-Louise Parker
- Issa Rae
- Cybill Shepherd
- Jane Wyatt

2 nominations

- Pamela Adlon
- Delta Burke
- Spring Byington
- Nell Carter
- Toni Collette
- Kaley Cuoco
- Fran Drescher
- Elle Fanning
- Barbara Feldon
- America Ferrera
- Felicity Huffman
- Ellie Kemper
- Swoosie Kurtz
- Hope Lange
- Ida Lupino
- Natasha Lyonne
- Catherine O'Hara
- Suzanne Pleshette
- Phylicia Rashad
- Marion Ross
- Irene Ryan
- Susan Saint James
- Amy Schumer

== Total awards by network ==
- CBS – 26
- NBC – 16
- HBO/HBO Max/Max – 11
- ABC – 8
- Showtime – 2
- Amazon – 2
- Pop TV - 1

== See also ==
- Actor Award for Outstanding Performance by a Female Actor in a Comedy Series
- Best Actress
- Critics' Choice Television Award for Best Actress in a Comedy Series
- Golden Globe Award for Best Actress – Television Series Musical or Comedy
- List of acting awards
- List of television awards for Best Actress
- Primetime Emmy Award for Outstanding Lead Actor in a Comedy Series
- Primetime Emmy Award for Outstanding Supporting Actor in a Comedy Series
- Primetime Emmy Award for Outstanding Supporting Actress in a Comedy Series
- Primetime Emmy Award for Outstanding Lead Actor in a Drama Series
- Primetime Emmy Award for Outstanding Lead Actress in a Drama Series
- Primetime Emmy Award for Outstanding Supporting Actor in a Drama Series
- Primetime Emmy Award for Outstanding Supporting Actress in a Drama Series
- Primetime Emmy Award for Outstanding Lead Actor in a Limited or Anthology Series or Movie
- Primetime Emmy Award for Outstanding Lead Actress in a Limited or Anthology Series or Movie
- Primetime Emmy Award for Outstanding Supporting Actor in a Limited or Anthology Series or Movie
- Primetime Emmy Award for Outstanding Supporting Actress in a Limited or Anthology Series or Movie
- TCA Award for Individual Achievement in Drama
