= Chommanard Book Prize =

Thai literary award

The Chommanard Book Prize is a distinguished Thai literary award established to honor and promote female authors. Since its inception, the prize has recognized outstanding works by women writers, alternating between fiction and non-fiction categories. The event is sponsored by the Bangkok Bank and organized by Praphansarn Publishing Co, Ltd.

The inaugural prize in 2007 was awarded for a work of fiction.

In 2010, the theme was modern non-fiction and the prize was awarded to an autobiographical work.

== Awardees ==
Thai Awardees:

- 2007 Judy Chan, Roi Wasan (A walk through Spring)
- 2010 Thanadda Sawangduean, Chan Chue Eri: Kap Prasopkarn Tang Daen (I Am Eri: My Experience Overseas)
- 2013 Dr. Chanwalee Srisukho, “Phrueksa Mata” (“Mother Nature”) and Sirinrampai Praphanthawee for "One Life Before Sunset
- 2015 Sudanee Buranabenjasatean, "Khao Tra Na Wa Mor Kha Khon" (A Physician was Branded a Murderer)
- 2016 Thanadda Sawangduean, Caged: Women’s Voices from a Bangkok Prison
- 2017 Chantara Rasimeetong, Chantana’s dreams
- 2018 First Runner Up, Kanaporn Samritluan, “Loke Koo Khonan” (“Parallel Worlds”)
- 2020 Witida Ditiecher, Roibaht (The Loop).
- 2021 Chaninthon Chuenphoklang, The Lost Fairy
- 2022 Sasivimon Notthee Suradetchamongkhon, Temple of the False Truth
- 2023 Ladawan Yaimanee (Pen name: Ruk2lus), White Cat of Blue Destiny
- 2024 Parimaphatra Waithayawongsakul, The Vampire and the Tree

International Awardees:

2023 Anchalee Vivatanachai (Thai-American), Chommanard Lifetime Achievement Award

2024 Ratih Kumala, Gadis Kretek, 1st Chommanard ASEAN Women's Literary Award

2025 Lau Yee Wa, Tongueless, 1st Chommanard International Women's Literary Award

== See also ==
- List of literary awards honoring women
