= List of television awards for Best Actress =

This list of television awards for Best Actress is an index to articles that describe "Best Actress" awards for television performances. It includes general awards and awards for performance is a drama series, mini-series or television movie, and musical or comedy.

== General ==
Country	Award	Venue / sponsor	Notes
Australia	AACTA Award for Best Lead Actress in a Television Drama	Australian Film Institute	
Malaysia	Asian Television Award for Best Actress	Asian Television Awards	
United States	Black Reel Award for Best Actress: T.V. Movie/Cable	Black Reel Awards	African American
United Kingdom	British Academy Television Award for Best Actress	British Academy Television Awards	
China	Flying Apsaras Award for Outstanding Actress	Flying Apsaras Awards	
Taiwan	Golden Bell Award for Best Actress	Golden Bell Awards	
China	Golden Eagle Award for Best Actress (China)	China TV Golden Eagle Award	
United States	International Emmy Award for Best Actress	International Academy of Television Arts and Sciences	
India	ITA Award for Best Actress in a Supporting Role	Indian Television Academy Awards	
India	Kerala State Television Award for Best Actress	Kerala State Chalachitra Academy	Malayalam
Brazil	Prêmio Extra de Televisão de melhor atriz	Extra (newspaper)	
United States	Saturn Award for Best Actress on Television	Academy of Science Fiction, Fantasy and Horror Films	
Hong Kong	TVB Anniversary Award for Best Actress	TVB	
Mexico	TVyNovelas Award for Best Actress	Televisa, TVyNovelas	
United States	Your World Awards for Favorite Lead Actress	Telemundo	Spanish language

== Drama series ==
Country	Award	Venue / sponsor	Notes
United States	Critics' Choice Television Award for Best Actress in a Drama Series	Critics' Choice Television Award	
United States	Daytime Emmy Award for Outstanding Lead Actress in a Drama Series	National Academy of Television Arts and Sciences, Academy of Television Arts & Sciences	
United States	Primetime Emmy Award for Outstanding Lead Actress in a Drama Series	Academy of Television Arts & Sciences	
United States	Golden Globe Award for Best Actress – Television Series Drama	Hollywood Foreign Press Association	
United States	NAACP Image Award for Outstanding Actress in a Daytime Drama Series	NAACP Image Awards	African American
United States	NAACP Image Award for Outstanding Actress in a Drama Series	NAACP Image Awards	African American
United States	Satellite Award for Best Actress – Television Series Drama	International Press Academy	
United States	Screen Actors Guild Award for Outstanding Performance by a Female Actor in a Drama Series	Screen Actors Guild	
United States	Soap Opera Digest Award for Outstanding Lead Actress in a Daytime Drama	Soap Opera Digest	

== Miniseries or Television Movie ==
Country	Award	Venue / sponsor	Notes
United States	Black Reel Award for Outstanding Actress, TV Movie or Limited Series	Black Reel Awards	African American
United States	Primetime Emmy Award for Outstanding Lead Actress in a Limited Series or Movie	Academy of Television Arts & Sciences	
Taiwan	Golden Bell Award for Best Actress in a Miniseries or Television Film	Golden Bell Awards	
United States	Golden Globe Award for Best Actress – Miniseries or Television Film	Hollywood Foreign Press Association	
United States	NAACP Image Award for Outstanding Actress in a Television Movie, Mini-Series or Dramatic Special	NAACP Image Awards	African American
United States	Satellite Award for Best Actress – Miniseries or Television Film	International Press Academy	
United States	Screen Actors Guild Award for Outstanding Performance by a Female Actor in a Miniseries or Television Movie	Screen Actors Guild	

== Musical or Comedy ==
Country	Award	Venue / sponsor	Notes
Australia	AACTA Award for Best Performance in a Television Comedy	Australian Academy of Cinema and Television Arts	
South Korea	Baeksang Arts Awards for Best Variety Performer - Female	Baeksang Arts Awards	
United States	Critics' Choice Television Award for Best Actress in a Comedy Series	Critics' Choice Television Award	
United States	Primetime Emmy Award for Outstanding Lead Actress in a Comedy Series	Primetime Emmy Award	
United States	Golden Globe Award for Best Actress – Television Series Musical or Comedy	Hollywood Foreign Press Association	
India	ITA Award for Best Actress - Comedy	Indian Television Academy Awards	
United States	Satellite Award for Best Actress – Television Series Musical or Comedy	International Press Academy	
United States	Screen Actors Guild Award for Outstanding Performance by a Female Actor in a Comedy Series	Screen Actors Guild	

== See also ==
- Best Actress
- Lists of awards
- Lists of acting awards
- List of awards for actresses
- List of television acting awards
