= Sumathi Best Teledrama Child Actor Award =

The Sumathi Best Teledrama Child Actor Award is presented annually in Sri Lanka by the Sumathi Group to the best Sri Lankan child actor in television.

The award was first given in 2014 with the collaboration of Anchor. Following is a list of the winners of this title.

Year	Best Actor	Teledrama	Ref.
2014	Esha Perera	Appachchi	
2015	Viraj Madushan	Colamba Ahasa	
2016	Esha Perera	Rathu Ahasa	
2017	Saheli Sadithma Satharasinghe	Thaara	
2018	Yohani Hansika	His Ahasa Yata	
2019	Seneru Rathnayake	Thaththa	
2021	Akindu Menuja	Weeraya Gedara Awith	
