= List of television awards for Best Actor =

This list of television awards for Best Actor is an index to articles about "Best Actor" awards for television performances.

== General ==
Country	Award	Venue / sponsor	Notes
Malaysia	Asian Television Award for Best Actor	Asian Television Awards	
United Kingdom	British Academy Television Award for Best Actor	British Academy of Film and Television Arts	
China	Flying Apsaras Award for Outstanding Actor	Flying Apsaras Awards	
Taiwan	Golden Bell Award for Best Actor	Golden Bell Awards	
China	Golden Eagle Award for Best Actor (China)	China Television Artists Association	
United States	International Emmy Award for Best Actor	International Academy of Television Arts and Sciences	
India	ITA Award for Best Actor in a Negative Role	Indian Television Academy Awards	
India	ITA Award for Best Actor in a Supporting Role	Indian Television Academy Awards	
India	Kerala State Television Award for Best Actor	Kerala State Chalachitra Academy	Malayalam
Brazil	Prêmio Extra de Televisão de melhor ator	Jornal Extra	
Hong Kong	TVB Anniversary Award for Best Actor	TVB	
Mexico	TVyNovelas Award for Best Actor	Premios TVyNovelas	
United States	Your World Awards for Favorite Lead Actor	Telemundo	Hispano-American

== Drama ==
Country	Award	Venue / sponsor	Notes
Australia	AACTA Award for Best Lead Actor in a Television Drama	Australian Academy of Cinema and Television Arts	
United Kingdom	British Soap Award for Best Actor	The British Soap Awards	
United States	Critics' Choice Television Award for Best Actor in a Drama Series	Critics' Choice Television Award	
United States	Daytime Emmy Award for Outstanding Lead Actor in a Drama Series	National Academy of Television Arts and Sciences; Academy of Television Arts & Sciences	
United States	Primetime Emmy Award for Outstanding Lead Actor in a Drama Series	Academy of Television Arts & Sciences	
United States	Golden Globe Award for Best Actor – Television Series Drama	Hollywood Foreign Press Association	
United States	NAACP Image Award for Outstanding Actor in a Daytime Drama Series	NAACP Image Awards	African American
United States	Satellite Award for Best Actor – Television Series Drama	International Press Academy	
United States	Screen Actors Guild Award for Outstanding Performance by a Male Actor in a Drama Series	Screen Actors Guild	

== Miniseries or Television film ==
Country	Award	Venue / sponsor	Notes
United States	Primetime Emmy Award for Outstanding Lead Actor in a Limited Series or Movie	Academy of Television Arts & Sciences	
Taiwan	Golden Bell Award for Best Actor in a Miniseries or Television Film	Golden Bell Awards	
United States	Golden Globe Award for Best Actor – Miniseries or Television Film	Hollywood Foreign Press Association	
United States	Satellite Award for Best Actor – Miniseries or Television Film	International Press Academy	
United States	Screen Actors Guild Award for Outstanding Performance by a Male Actor in a Miniseries or Television Movie	Screen Actors Guild	

== Musical or comedy ==
Country	Award	Venue / sponsor	Notes
Australia	AACTA Award for Best Performance in a Television Comedy	Australian Academy of Cinema and Television Arts	
South Korea	Baeksang Arts Awards for Best Variety Performer - Male	Baeksang Arts Awards	
United States	Critics' Choice Television Award for Best Actor in a Comedy Series	Critics' Choice Television Award	
United States	Primetime Emmy Award for Outstanding Lead Actor in a Comedy Series	Academy of Television Arts & Sciences	
United States	Golden Globe Award for Best Actor – Television Series Musical or Comedy	Hollywood Foreign Press Association	
India	ITA Award for Best Actor - Comedy	Indian Television Academy Awards	
United States	Satellite Award for Best Actor – Television Series Musical or Comedy	International Press Academy	
United States	Screen Actors Guild Award for Outstanding Performance by a Male Actor in a Comedy Series	Screen Actors Guild	

== See also ==
- Best Actor
- Leading actor
- Lists of awards
- Lists of acting awards
- List of television awards
