= Toronto Alliance for the Performing Arts =

Toronto Alliance for the Performing Arts (TAPA) is an arts service organization representing professional theatre, dance and opera companies in the City of Toronto. Amongst their 175 members are the Canadian Opera Company, Luminato, Factory Theatre, Mirvish Productions, and Theatre Passe Muraille. As a lobby and advocacy group, it has been credited with playing a major role in raising Toronto's theatrical profile. TAPA also presents the annual Dora Mavor Moore Awards, operates T.O. TIX (Toronto's central ticketing outlet), and publishes Go Live Toronto, an online guide to theatre, dance and opera performances in the city. In 2008, the organization published a detailed survey of Toronto's performing arts groups, the first of its kind to be conducted there.

== History ==
TAPA was originally formed in 1977 and officially incorporated in 1979. Then known as the ‘Toronto Theatre Alliance’, the organization was much smaller, and has since grown substantially. Over a decade ago TAPA was faced with a financial crisis, and the organization nearly closed its doors.
