= ITFA Best Actor Award =

The ITFA Best Actor Award is given by the state government as part of its annual International Tamil Film Awards for Tamil (Kollywood) films.

== The list ==
Here is a list of the award winners and the films for which they won.

Year	Actor	Film
2011	Silambarasan	Vaanam
2008	R. Madhavan	Evano Oruvan
2004	Suriya	Kaakha Kaakha
2003	Vikram	Dhool
2002	Vikram	Gemini

== See also ==
- Tamil cinema
- Cinema of India
