= List of film awards for lead actress =

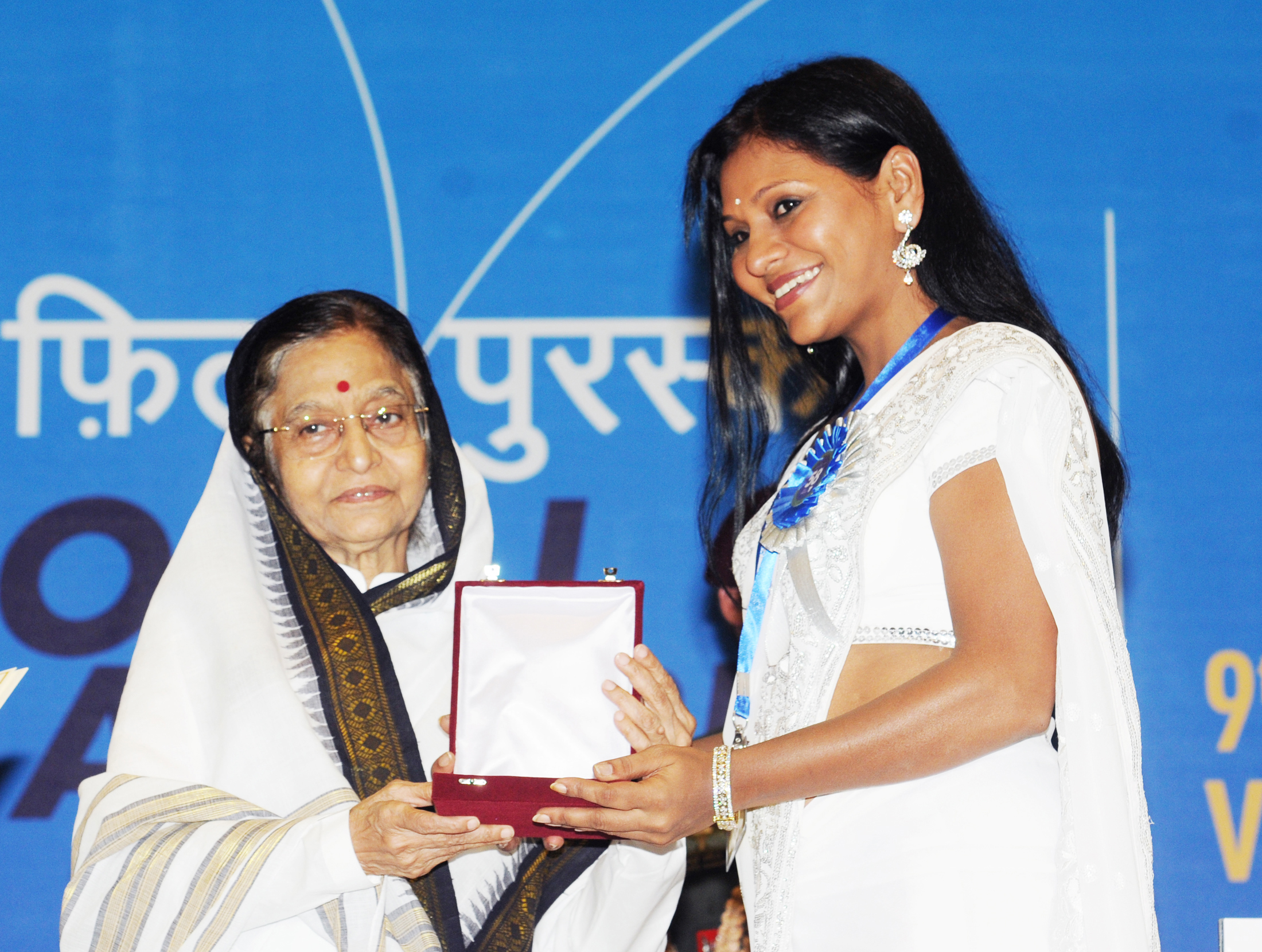
President of India Pratibha Patil presenting the Best Actress award to Mitalee Jagtap Varadkar for Baboo Band Baaja at the National Film Awards in 2011

This list of film awards for lead actress is an index to articles that describe awards given to the leading actresses in films, typically called the "Best Actress" award. The list is organized by region and country of the venue or sponsor of the award, but some awards are not limited to films or actresses from that country.

== Africa ==
Country	Award	Venue / sponsor	Notes
Nigeria	Africa Movie Academy Award for Best Actress in a Leading Role	Africa Film Academy	

== Americas ==
Country	Award	Venue / sponsor	Notes
Canada	Canadian Screen Award for Best Actress	Academy of Canadian Cinema & Television	
Canada	Prix Iris for Best Actress	Québec Cinéma	
Canada	Toronto Film Critics Association Award for Best Actress	Toronto Film Critics Association	
Canada	Vancouver Film Critics Circle Award for Best Actress in a Canadian Film	Vancouver Film Critics Circle	
Canada	Vancouver Film Critics Circle Award for Best Actress	Vancouver Film Critics Circle	
Ibero-America	Platino Award for Best Actress	Platino Awards	
Mexico	Ariel Award for Best Actress	Academia Mexicana de Artes y Ciencias Cinematográficas	
United States	Academy Award for Best Actress	Academy of Motion Picture Arts and Sciences	
United States	BET Award for Best Actress	BET	African Americans
United States	Black Reel Award for Best Actress	Black Reel Awards	African Americans
United States	Black Reel Award for Outstanding Actress	Black Reel Awards	African Americans
United States	Bollywood Movie Award – Best Actress	Bollywood Movie Awards	
United States	Boston Society of Film Critics Award for Best Actress	Boston Society of Film Critics	
United States	Chicago Film Critics Association Award for Best Actress	Chicago Film Critics Association	
United States	Critics' Choice Movie Award for Best Actress in a Comedy	Critics' Choice Movie Awards	
United States	Critics' Choice Movie Award for Best Actress in an Action Movie	Critics' Choice Movie Awards	
United States	Critics' Choice Movie Award for Best Actress	Critics' Choice Movie Awards	
United States	Dallas–Fort Worth Film Critics Association Award for Best Actress	Dallas–Fort Worth Film Critics Association	
United States	Fangoria Chainsaw Award for Best Actress	Fangoria Chainsaw Awards	Horror
United States	Golden Globe Award for Best Actress in a Motion Picture – Drama	Hollywood Foreign Press Association	
United States	Golden Globe Award for Best Actress – Motion Picture Comedy or Musical	Hollywood Foreign Press Association	
United States	Golden Raspberry Award for Worst Actress	Golden Raspberry Awards	
United States	Gotham Independent Film Award for Best Actress	Gotham Awards	Independent film
United States	Houston Film Critics Society Award for Best Actress	Houston Film Critics Society	
United States	Independent Spirit Award for Best Female Lead	Independent Spirit Awards	
United States	Los Angeles Film Critics Association Award for Best Actress	Los Angeles Film Critics Association	
United States	National Board of Review Award for Best Actress	National Board of Review	
United States	National Society of Film Critics Award for Best Actress	National Society of Film Critics	
United States	New York Film Critics Circle Award for Best Actress	New York Film Critics Circle	
United States	Online Film Critics Society Award for Best Actress	Online Film Critics Society	
United States	San Diego Film Critics Society Award for Best Actress	San Diego Film Critics Society	
United States	San Francisco Bay Area Film Critics Circle Award for Best Actress	San Francisco Bay Area Film Critics Circle	
United States	Satellite Award for Best Actress – Motion Picture	International Press Academy	
United States	Saturn Award for Best Actress	Academy of Science Fiction, Fantasy and Horror Films	
United States	Screen Actors Guild Award for Outstanding Performance by a Female Actor in a Leading Role	Screen Actors Guild	
United States	Silver Hugo Award for Best Actress	Chicago International Film Festival	
United States	St. Louis Gateway Film Critics Association Award for Best Actress	St. Louis Film Critics Association	
United States	Tribeca Film Festival Award for Best Actress	Tribeca Film Festival	
United States	Washington D.C. Area Film Critics Association Award for Best Actress	Washington D.C. Area Film Critics Association	
United States	Young Artist Award for Best Leading Young Actress in a Feature Film	Young Artist Award	
United States	NAACP Image Award for Outstanding Actress in a Motion Picture	NAACP Image Awards	African-American

== Asia ==
Country	Award	Venue / sponsor	Notes
China	Golden Goblet Award for Best Actress	Shanghai International Film Festival	
China	Golden Rooster Award for Best Actress	Golden Rooster Awards	
China	Huabiao Award for Outstanding Actress	Huabiao Awards	
China	Hundred Flowers Award for Best Actress	China Film Association	
China	Shanghai Film Critics Award for Best Actress	Shanghai Film Critics Awards	
Hong Kong	Asian Film Award for Best Actress	Hong Kong International Film Festival	
Hong Kong	Hong Kong Film Award for Best Actress	Hong Kong Film Award	
India	Bengal Film Journalists' Association – Best Actress Award	Bengal Film Journalists' Association	
India	Cinema Express Award for Best Actress – Tamil	Cinema Express Awards	Tamil
India	Filmfare Award for Best Actress – Kannada	Filmfare	
India	Filmfare Award for Best Actress – Malayalam	Filmfare	
India	Filmfare Award for Best Actress – Tamil	Filmfare	
India	Filmfare Award for Best Actress – Telugu	Filmfare	Telugu
India	Filmfare Award for Best Actress - Hindi	Filmfare	Hindi
India	IFFI Best Actor Award (Female)	International Film Festival of India	
India	IIFA Award for Best Actress	International Indian Film Academy	Hindi
India	IIFA Utsavam Award for Best Actress – Telugu	International Indian Film Academy	Telugu
India	ITFA Best Actress Award	International Tamil Film Awards	
India	Kerala State Film Award for Best Actress	Kerala State Film Awards	Malayalam
India	Nandi Award for Best Actress	Nandi Awards	Telugu
India	National Film Award for Best Actress	National Film Awards	
India	Santosham Best Actress Award	Santosham Film Awards	Telugu
India	Screen Award for Best Actress (Critics)	Screen Awards / StarPlus	Hindi
India	Screen Award for Best Actress (Popular Choice)	Screen Awards / StarPlus	Hindi
India	Screen Award for Best Actress	Screen Awards / StarPlus	Hindi
India	SIIMA Award for Best Actress	SIIMA	Telugu
India	Tamil Nadu State Film Award for Best Actress	Tamil Nadu State Film Awards	Tamil
India	Vijay Award for Best Actress	Vijay Awards	Tamil
India	Zee Cine Award for Best Actor – Female	Zee Entertainment Enterprises	Hindi
Indonesia	Citra Award for Best Leading Actress	Indonesian Film Festival	
Japan	Blue Ribbon Awards for Best Actress	Blue Ribbon Awards	
Japan	Japan Academy Film Prize for Outstanding Performance by an Actress in a Leading Role	Japan Academy Film Prize	
Japan	Mainichi Film Award for Best Actress	Mainichi Film Awards	
Japan	Nikkan Sports Film Award for Best Actress	Nikkan Sports Film Award	
Japan	Tokyo Sports Film Award for Best Actress	Tokyo Sports Film Award	
Macau	Golden Lotus Award for Best Actress	Macau International Movie Festival	
Philippines	Box Office Entertainment Award for Box Office Queen	Memorial Scholarship Foundation	
Philippines	Box Office Entertainment Award for Phenomenal Box Office Star	Memorial Scholarship Foundation	
Philippines	Gawad Urian for Best Actress	Filipino Film Critics	
Philippines	Metro Manila Film Festival Award for Best Actress	Metropolitan Manila Development Authority	
Philippines	Star Award for Movie Actress of the Year	PMPC Star Awards for Movies	
South Korea	Baeksang Arts Awards for Best Actress (Film)	Baeksang Arts Awards	
Taiwan	Golden Horse Award for Best Leading Actress	Golden Horse Film Festival and Awards	
Vietnam	Best Actress Award (Vietnam Film Festival)	Vietnam Film Festival	

== Europe ==
Country	Award	Venue / sponsor	Notes
Europe	European Film Award for Best Actress	European Film Awards	
Belgium	Magritte Award for Best Actress	Académie André Delvaux	
Croatia	Golden Arena for Best Actress	Pula Film Festival	
Denmark	Robert Award for Best Actress in a Leading Role	Danish Film Academy	
France	Cannes Film Festival Award for Best Actress	Cannes Film Festival	
France	César Award for Best Actress	Académie des Arts et Techniques du Cinéma	
France	Globe de Cristal Award for Best Actress	French Press Association	
France	Lumière Award for Best Actress	Académie des Lumières	
Germany	Bavarian Film Awards (Best Acting)	State of Bavaria	
Germany	Silver Bear for Best Actress	Berlin International Film Festival	
Iceland	Edda Award for Best Leading Actor or Actress	Edda Awards	
Italy	Annecy Film Festival Award for Best Actress	Annecy Italian Film Festival	
Italy	David di Donatello for Best Actress	Accademia del Cinema Italiano	
Italy	David di Donatello for Best Foreign Actress	Accademia del Cinema Italiano	
Italy	Nastro d'Argento for Best Actress	Sindacato Nazionale dei Giornalisti Cinematografici Italiani	Film critics award
Netherlands	Golden Calf for Best Actress	Netherlands Film Festival	
Poland	Polish Academy Award for Best Actress	Polish Film Awards	
Russia	Golden Eagle Award for Best Leading Actress	National Academy of Motion Pictures Arts and Sciences	
Spain	Goya Award for Best Actress	Goya Awards	
Sri Lanka	Sarasaviya Best Actress Award	Associated Newspapers of Ceylon Limited	
Sweden	Guldbagge Award for Best Actress in a Leading Role	Swedish Film Institute	
United Kingdom	BAFTA Award for Best Actress in a Leading Role	British Academy of Film and Television Arts	
United Kingdom	BIFA for Best Performance by an Actress in a British Independent Film	British Independent Film Awards	
United Kingdom	Empire Award for Best Actress	Empire (film magazine)	
United Kingdom	Empire Award for Best British Actress	Empire (film magazine)	
United Kingdom	London Film Critics' Circle Award for Actress of the Year	London Film Critics' Circle	
United Kingdom	London Film Critics' Circle Award for British Actress of the Year	London Film Critics' Circle	

== Oceania ==
Country	Award	Venue / sponsor	Notes
Australia	AACTA Award for Best Actress in a Leading Role	Australian Academy of Cinema and Television Arts	
Australia	AACTA International Award for Best Actress	Australian Academy of Cinema and Television Arts	Film made outside Australia. From 2011
Australia	Australian Film Institute International Award for Best Actress	Australian Academy of Cinema and Television Arts	From 2005-2010

== See also ==
- Best Actress
- Lists of awards
- Lists of acting awards
- List of awards for actresses
- List of film awards
