= Lists of acting awards =

Lists of acting awards are indexes to articles about notable awards given for acting. They include general awards, awards for a specific medium (film, theatre or television), and awards for actresses, male actors, supporting actors and young actors.

== General ==
- Art Prize of the German Democratic Republic
- Doris Duke Performing Artist Award.
- The Gielgud Award
- Golden Boot Awards
- Primetime Emmy Award for Outstanding Voice-Over Performance
- TVB Star Awards Malaysia

== By medium ==
- List of film acting awards
- List of theatre acting awards
- List of television acting awards

== Actresses ==
- List of awards for actresses
- List of film awards for lead actress
- List of television awards for Best Actress

== Male actors ==
- List of awards for male actors
- List of film awards for lead actor
- List of television awards for Best Actor

== Young actors ==
- List of awards for supporting actor (film and television, male and female)
- List of awards for young actors

== See also ==
- Lists of awards
- List of performing arts awards
