= TVyNovelas =

Mexican magazine

- Categories: Entertainment
- Frequency: Monthly
- Publisher: Editorial Televisa
- Founded: 1982; 44 years ago
- Country: Mexico
- Language: Spanish
- Website: www.tvynovelas.com/mx/
- ISSN: 0188-0683

TVyNovelas is a monthly Mexican tabloid magazine published by Editorial Televisa. It specializes in entertainment and show business, focusing mainly on Mexican and international television, particularly programs broadcast by TelevisaUnivision.

== History and profile ==
TVyNovelas was established in 1982. Four international editions are also published: United States, Puerto Rico, Argentina, Chile and Colombia. It is considered the leader among showbusiness publications in Mexico, especially on the subject of telenovelas. The magazine also gives awards to the best telenovelas and TV shows of the year ("Premios TVyNovelas") broadcast by Televisa in Mexico and Univision in the United States.

== See also ==
- Telenovela Database
