= International Press Academy =

American association of professional entertainment journalists

- Abbreviation: IPA
- Formation: 1996
- Type: Professional entertainment media association
- Purpose: Honor artistic excellence in the areas of motion pictures, television, radio and new media
- Headquarters: Beverly Hills, California, United States
- President: Mirjana Van Blaricom
- Website: pressacademy.com

The International Press Academy (IPA) is an American association of professional entertainment journalists, representing both domestic and foreign markets in print, television, radio, cable and new media outlets. Its members have annually been giving what are now known as the Satellite Awards since January 1997.

All full-time entertainment journalists are eligible to join; membership is open to journalists listed in the MPAA directory and to those working journalists who submit at least six entertainment-related clips to be considered by the board.

The academy was founded in 1996 by Mirjana Van Blaricom.

== Awards ==
The IPA annually recognizes achievements in the fields of cinema, television and new media through the Satellite Awards (originally known as the Golden Satellite Awards).

Special achievement awards presented by the IPA include the Mary Pickford Award (for outstanding contribution to the entertainment industry), the Auteur Award (to honor filmmakers whose vision and artistic control are reflected in their films), and the Nikola Tesla Award (in recognition of visionary achievements in filmmaking technology).
