= Big Brother All Stars (Belgian TV series) =

- Presented by: Walter Grootaers; Gerrit De Cock
- No. of days: 21
- No. of housemates: 12
- Winner: Heidi Zutterman
- Runner-up: Kelly Vandevenne

Release
- Original network: KanaalTwee
- Original release: 31 August – 20 September 2003

Big Brother All Stars is the all-stars format spin-off season of the Belgian version of Big Brother aired in the Flemish Region of Belgium on KanaalTwee.

The show started on 31 August 2003, with twelve past Housemates from the previous seasons, and finished on 20 September 2003 with a total duration of 21 days.

Although the All-Stars concept was applauded when revealed, this season's ratings dropped. Announced as "the battle of the best (housemates)", the viewers and critics missed a battle. Since there were no tasks but only challenges that didn't last long, most of the time the housemates were bored.

The missing of the most famous housemate of Big Brother Belgium, Betty Owczarek was remarkable. The most controversial candidate, Dominique Cardon, was voted out during the launch night. The most rebellious housemate, Steven Spillebeen, made it obvious during the kick-off he felt obligated to participate (as the first Big Brother Belgium winner) but didn't want to be there. He asked to be and was voted out on Day 3. The winner was Heidi Zutterman of the third season who was named "Best Housemate". She didn't receive a money prize but a statue of a sword with the inscriptions of all stars and the inscription "Only can survive".

Immediately after the All-Stars season, the fourth regular season started.

== Format ==
In the All-Stars season, the housemates weren't unknown people but past housemates from the past three seasons of Big Brother Belgium. Having four housemates of each season, including each winner and runner-up, the show was announced as a battle of the best. The housemates who participated were announced in a large campaign in which they were portrayed as fighters, ready to combat each other.

This season followed the same concept as the regular seasons. Differences were that there were no tasks but challenges. Every housemate could ask for a challenge, challenging the reigning Big Boss. When defeating Big Boss, the challenging housemate became the new Big Boss. Big Boss was a new introduction in this series. The big advantage of Big Boss was being able to change the nominations: Big Boss could save one of the nominated housemates by changing that housemate for another.

== Housemates ==
Name	Age on entry	Hometown	Big Brother history		Day entered	Day exited	Result
Name	Age on entry	Hometown	Season	Result	Day entered	Day exited	Result
Heidi Zutterman	25	Bruges	Big Brother 3	Evicted - 5th Place	1	21	Winner
Kelly Vandevenne	27	Sint-Truiden	Big Brother 3	Winner - 1st Place	1	21	Runner-up
Ellen Dufour	22	Zutendaal	Big Brother 2	Winner - 1st Place	1	21	3rd Place
Sabrina Vanderstappen	24	Diest	Big Brother 3	Evicted - 10th Place	1	19	Evicted
Edith Marín	33	Temse	Big Brother 1	Evicted - 11th Place	1	17	Evicted
Jeroen Denaeghel	31	Aalter	Big Brother 1	Finalist - Third place	1	15	Evicted
Thierry Andries	36	Bruges	Big Brother 2	Runner-up - 2nd Place	1	13	Evicted
Bart van Opstal	28	Olen	Big Brother 1	Runner-up - 2nd Place	1	10	Evicted
Filip Van Den Eynde	27	Sint-Niklaas	Big Brother 3	Runner-up - 2nd Place	1	8	Evicted
Kurt Willem	32	Ostend	Big Brother 2	Evicted - 5th Place	1	6	Evicted
Steven Spillebeen	28	Izegem	Big Brother 1	Winner - 1st Place	1	3	Evicted
Dominique Cardon	29	Bruges	Big Brother 2	Evicted - 6th Place	1	1	Evicted

== Daily summary ==
Day 1
Day 1	Entrances	Former winner Steven and housemates Bart, Edith and Jeroen from the first season entered the house.; Former winner Ellen and housemates Dominique, Kurt and Thierry from the second season entered the house.; Former winner Kelly and housemates Filip, Heidi and Sabrina from the third season entered the house.
Day 1	Exits	Dominque was nominated by the housemates to leave the house.
Day 1	Highlights	Filip is voted the first Big Boss by the housemates.
Day 2
Day 2	Nominations	Jeroen, Kurt, and Steven received the most nominations. Big Boss Filip changed Kurt for Bart. Bart, Jeroen and Steven faced the public vote.
Day 2	Challenge	Ellen challenged Big Boss in agility. The challenge was to cross over and under a table without touching the ground. Ellen won and became the new Big Boss.
Day 3
Day 3	Challenge	Edith challenged Big Boss Ellen in endurance. The challenge was to hold a coin with the nose against the window. Edith won and became the new Big Boss.
Day 3	Exits	Steven was evicted from the house.
Day 4
Day 4	Challenge	Thierry challenged Big Boss Edith in endurance. The challenge was to throw the other one in the swimming pool. Thierry lost and Edith stayed Big Boss. Kelly challenged Big Boss Edith in endurance. The challenge was to tickle each other with a feather. Kelly won and became the new Big Boss.
Day 4	Nominations	Bart, Ellen, Jeroen, and Sabrina received the most nominations. Big Boss Kelly changed Bart for Kurt. Ellen, Jeroen, Kurt and Sabrina faced the public vote.
Day 5
Day 5	Challenge	Sabrina challenged Big Boss Kelly in agility. The challenge was to stay the longest on a float pulled by a speedboat. Kelly won and stayed Big Boss.
Day 6
Day 6	Challenge	Kurt challenged Big Boss Kelly in agility. The challenge was to fill beer glasses without spilling. Kurt won and became the new Big Boss. Since Big Boss Kurt was evicted, housemates voted for the new Big Boss. This was Bart. Jeroen challenged Big Boss Bart in intelligence. The challenge was to do the best dictation. Jeroen won and became the new Big Boss.
Day 6	Exits	Kurt was evicted from the house.
Day 7
Day 7	Highlights	Bart and Jeroen returned as Los Papagueros, the act they created in the first season.
Day 7	Nominations	Bart and Filip received the most nominations. Big Boss Jeroen changed Bart for Kelly. Kelly and Filip faced the public vote.
Day 7	Challenge	Kelly challenged Big Boss Jeroen in endurance. The challenge was to wrestle. Kelly won and became the new Big Boss.
Day 8
Day 8	Challenge	Filip challenged Big Boss Kelly in endurance. The challenge was to saw a trunk. Kelly won and stayed new Big Boss.
Day 8	Exits	Filip was evicted from the house.
Day 9
Day 9	Challenge	Thierry challenged Big Boss Filip in endurance. The challenge was to gain as much weight as possible in 15 minutes. Thierry won and became the new Big Boss.
Day 9	Nominations	Bart, Edith and Heidi received the most nominations and faced the public vote.
Day 10
Day 10	Challenge	Heidi challenged Big Boss Filip in agility. The challenge was to find balance above a swimming pool. Heidi won and became the new Big Boss.
Day 10	Exits	Bart was evicted from the house.
Day 11
Day 11	Challenge	Jeroen challenged Big Boss Heidi in agility. The challenge was to drive a go-cart. Jeroen won and became the new Big Boss. Sabrina challenged Big Boss Jeroen in agility. The challenge was to find objects while being blinded. Sabrina won and became the new Big Boss.
Day 11	Nominations	Jeroen, Kelly and Thierry received the most nominations and faced the public vote.
Day 12
Day 12	Challenge	Ellen challenged Big Boss Sabrina in endurance. The challenge was to bicycle a traject. Ellen won and became the new Big Boss.
Day 13
Day 13	Challenge	Kelly challenged Big Boss Ellen in endurance. The challenge was to listen as long as possible to Barts's music single. Kelly won and became the new Big Boss.
Day 13	Exits	Thierry was evicted from the house.
Day 14
Day 14	Challenge	Jeroen challenged Big Boss Kelly in intelligence. The challenge was to solve math. Jeroen won and became the new Big Boss. Ellen challenged Big Boss Jeroen in endurance. The challenge was to kayak. Ellen lost and Jeroen stayed Big Boss. Sabrina was voted the new Big Boss by the housemates.
Day 14	Punishment	Since Ellen and Jeroen had contact with the outside world during their challenge, Jeroen's Big Brother title was stripped.
Day 14	Nominations	Edith, Heidi and Kelly received the most nominations. Big Boss Sabrina changed Heidi for Jeroen. Edith, Jeroen and Kelly faced the public vote.
Day 15
Day 15	Challenge	Heidi challenged Big Boss Sabrina in endurance. The challenge was to be quiet as long as possible. Heidi won and became the new Big Boss.
Day 15	Exits	Jeroen was evicted from the house.
Day 16
Day 16	Challenge	All housemates challenged Big Boss Heidi in endurance. The challenge was to do Fear Factor-tasks. Heidi won and stayed Big Boss.
Day 16	Nominations	Edith and Sabrina received the most nominations. Big Boss Heidi changed Sabrina for Kelly. Edith and Sabrina faced the public vote.
Day 17
Day 17	Challenge	Ellen & Kelly challenged Big Boss Heidi in endurance. The challenge was to find the way home in the dark. Ellen won and became the new Big Boss.
Day 17	Exits	Edith was evicted from the house.
Day 18
Day 18	Challenge	Heidi challenged Big Boss Ellen in agility. The challenge was to build a tower out of bricks. Heidi lost and Ellen stayed Big Boss.
Day 18	Nominations	All remaining housemates were nominated. Big Boss Ellen saved Heidi. Ellen, Kelly and Sabrina faced the public vote.
Day 19
Day 19	Exits	Sabrina was evicted from the house.
Day 20
Day 20	Highlights	The finalists got a pajama party for their last night in the Big Brother house.
Day 21
Day 21	Highlights	The finalists got the approval from Big Brother to make a complete mess of the house for the arrival of the new housemates of season 4.
Day 21	Exits	Ellen left the house in third place, Kelly left the house as the runner-up, and Heidi was revealed as the winner of the season.

== Nominations table ==
	Day 1	Day 3	Day 6	Day 8	Day 10	Day 13	Day 15	Day 17	Day 19	Day 21 Final	
Heidi	? ?	? ?	Filip, Jeroen	Filip, Kelly	Jeroen, Kelly	Jeroen, Kelly	Edith, Kelly	Edith, Kelly	Ellen, Kelly	Winner (Day 21)	
Kelly	? ?	? ?	Bart, Sabrina	Bart, Jeroen	Bart, Sabrina	Heidi, Thierry	Heidi, Jeroen	Edith, Sabrina	Heidi, Sabrina	Runner-up (Day 21)	
Ellen	? ?	? ?	Heidi, Thierry	Bart, Filip	Edith, Jeroen	Sabrina, Thierry	Heidi, Kelly	Edith, Sabrina	Ellen, Kelly	Third place (Day 21)	
Sabrina	? ?	? ?	Filip, Jeroen	Kelly, Thierry	Bart, Thierry	Jeroen, Kelly	Edith, Kelly	Edith, Ellen	Heidi, Sabrina	Evicted (Day 19)	
Edith	? ?	? ?	Bart, Thierry	Bart, Filip	Bart, Thierry	Jeroen, Thierry	Heidi, Sabrina	Heidi, Sabrina	Evicted (Day 17)		
Jeroen	? ?	Nominated	Kurt, Sabrina	Bart, Filip	Edith, Heidi	Edith, Kelly	Edith, Kelly	Evicted (Day 16)			
Thierry	? ?	? ?	Ellen, Sabrina	Bart, Filip	Edith, Heidi	Edith, Ellen	Evicted (Day 12)				
Bart	? ?	Nominated	Kurt, Sabrina	Edith, Filip	Edith, Heidi	Evicted (Day 10)					
Filip	? ?	? ?	Bart, Ellen	Bart, Ellen	Evicted (Day 8)						
Kurt	? ?	? ?	Ellen, Jeroen	Evicted (Day 5)							
Steven	? ?	Nominated	Evicted (Day 4)								
Dominique	Nominated	Evicted (Day 2)									
Notes	1		none		2		none		3	none	
Big Boss	none	Filip	Kelly	Jeroen	Kelly	Sabrina	Sabrina	Heidi	Ellen	none	
Nominated (pre-Big Boss)	Dominique, ?	Jeroen, Kurt, Steven	Bart, Ellen, Jeroen, Sabrina	Bart, Filip	Bart, Edith, Heidi	Jeroen, Kelly, Thierry	Edith, Heidi, Kelly	Edith, Kelly	Ellen, Heidi, Kelly, Sabrina	Ellen, Heidi, Kelly	
Saved (by Big Boss)	none	Kurt	Jeroen	Bart	none		Heidi	Sabrina	Heidi	none	
Nominated (by Big Boss)	none	Bart	Kurt	Kelly	none		Jeroen	Kelly	none	none	
Against public vote	Dominique, ?	Bart, Jeroen, Steven	Bart, Ellen, Kurt, Sabrina	Filip, Kelly	Bart, Edith, Heidi	Jeroen, Kelly, Thierry	Edith, Jeroen, Kelly	Edith, Kelly	Ellen, Kelly, Sabrina	Ellen, Heidi, Kelly	
Evicted	Dominique; Most votes to evict	Steven; Most votes to evict	Kurt; Most votes to evict	Filip; Most votes to evict	Bart; Most votes to evict	Thierry; Most votes to evict	Jeroen; Most votes to evict	Edith; Most votes to evict	Sabrina; Most votes to evict	Ellen; 26% to win	Kelly; 32% to win
Evicted	Dominique; Most votes to evict	Steven; Most votes to evict	Kurt; Most votes to evict	Filip; Most votes to evict	Bart; Most votes to evict	Thierry; Most votes to evict	Jeroen; Most votes to evict	Edith; Most votes to evict	Sabrina; Most votes to evict	Heidi; 41% to win	

=== Notes ===
^Note 1 : For the first two rounds of Nominations, details are not known of who Nominated who.
^Note 2 : The Big Boss decided to leave the Nominations unchanged.
^Note 3 : Housemates were allowed to Nominate themselves this Week.
