= Big Brother (Belgian TV series) season 5 =

Big Brother
- Season 5
- Presented by: Walter Grootaers; Sandrine Van Handenhove
- No. of days: 92
- No. of housemates: 15
- Winner: Kirsten Janssens
- Runner-up: David Tonnet

Release
- Original network: KanaalTwee
- Original release: 26 February – 29 May 2006

Season chronology
- ← Previous; Season 4 Next → Season 6

Big Brother 5, also known as Big Brother: Zero Privacy, was the fifth season of the Belgian version of Big Brother aired in the Flemish Region of Belgium on KanaalTwee.

After a three-year break, Big Brother 5 started on 26 February 2006 and finished on 29 May 2006 with a total duration of 92 days. The live shows were broadcast on Monday. A new house was built, it was completely made of glass from inside. 15 housemates participated this season. There was controversies around a housemate who was pregnant and a housemate who was diagnosed with HIV+. Concepts were "Zero privacy" and secrets. Kirsten Janssens was the winner and won €100,000.

The season was well received. Although the concept was "Zero privacy" and there were glass showers, there was less nudity this season. Director of KanaalTwee Nico Nulens called this a conscious choice because Big Brother was more than voyeurism. The revival season had more viewers than the previous season, having 355,000 ratings for the highlights and 420,000 ratings for the live shows. 607,237 viewers watched the final. because of the success of this season, a new season was announced at the final night.

== Format ==
This season launched as the revival of Big Brother Belgium after a three-year hiatus. It went back to the Back to Basics format and the nomination system as the first season. The slogan of the season was "Zero privacy". Since the previous house was demolished, a new house was built. All inner walls were made of glass, even the showers were in the middle of the bathroom and had only glass walls. It enlarged the concept "no privacy".

The central concept of the season was secrets. This season was filled with all kind of secrets:

- The start of the season featured a secret loft and secret housemates.
- Most housemates had a personal secret who were unveiled during the season.
- Big Brother gave secret tasks or missions to one or more housemates.

Another novelty was the concept of Big Boss. The housemates voted one of the housemates as the Big Boss at the start of the new week. The Big Boss had some personal benefits:

- Big Boss could live for the entire week in the more luxurious loft with a housemate of own choice.
- Big Boss was the first to be informed of the nominations. Big Boss could change one of those nominated housemates to another housemate (including themself).
- Big Boss did the group shopping.

== Housemates ==
In a relationship before Big Brother.

Name	Age on entry	Hometown	Occupation	Day entered	Day exited	Result
Kirsten Janssens	23	Kuringen, Limburg	medical administration	1	93	Winner
David Tonnet	22	Herent, Flemish Brabant	pub owner	1	93	Runner-up
Kevin Gadeyne	27	Blankenberge, West Flanders	process technician	1	93	3rd Place
Haris Mpacharis/Krallis	26	Kermt, Limburg	barber	1	86	Evicted
Bart Glazenmakers	35	Leopoldsburg, Limburg	metal welder	1	79	Evicted
Kenny van Quickelberghe	25	Ghent, East Flanders	waiter	1	72	Evicted
An Van Heeck	24	Aarschot, Flemish Brabant	saleswoman perfumery	1	65	Evicted
Audrey De Preter	31	Sint-Katelijne-Waver, Antwerp	unemployed	1	58	Evicted
Mike Van Butsele	23	Ghent, East Flanders	employee event agency	1	51	Evicted
Kathleen Mariën	22	Berlaar, Antwerp	unemployed	1	47	Evicted
Sandra De Witte	23	Temse, East Flanders	accountant	1	44	Evicted
Joël Van Grinderbeek	26	Begijnendijk, Flemish Brabant	painter	9	30	Evicted
Evi Tasset	24	Brussels	student journalism	1	23	Evicted
Nathalie Luckx	31	Landen, Flemish Brabant	employee sales	1	16	Evicted
Javier De Rycke	32	Brasschaat, Flemish Brabant	singer	1	16	Ejected

== Weekly summary ==
Week 1
Week 1	Entrances	On Day 1, An, Audrey, Bart, David, Harris, Kathleen, Kenny, Kevin, Kirsten, Nathalie, Mike and Sandra entered the house.; On Day 1, Evi and Javier entered the secret loft in the house.; On Day 8, Evi, Javier and Kathleen left the secret loft and joined the other housemates.
Week 1	Secrets	On Day 1, Kathleen shared her secret; her pregnancy.; On Day 1, Kenny shared his secret; he had HIV.; On Day 1, Bart and Nathalie had a secret; they were in a relationship. They got the task to hide this for the other housemates.; On Day 1, Sandra got the secret task to be as unsympathetic as possible so she would become nominated. If nominated, she would get a free pass and vice versa.; On Day 3, secret housemate Evi got the task to join the other housemates for one task.; On Day 3, An got the task to smuggle food every night to the loft.
Week 1	Tasks	On Day 2, housemates were given their first weekly task, which required them to only sleep for 25 hours. By doing individual tasks they could win more hours to sleep. They passed the task.
Week 1	Exits	On Day 1, the first three housemates had to evict one of the other nine housemates. Haris, Kirsten and Mike evict Kathleen. Unknown to the other housemates, Kathleen joins Evi and Javier at the secret loft.
Week 1	Highlights	On Day 3, David and Kevin created Lekker thuis in het Big Brother-huis (Good foot at home in the Big Brother house), a parody of a popular cooking program in Flanders.
Week 1	Punishments	On Day 4, following a short circuit, there was no power in the Big Brother house. Sandra told the other housemates about her secret mission. The camera crew heard this which made Sandra automatically nominated, by failing her task.
Week 1	Nominations	On Day 9, only the secret loft housemates, Evi, Javier and Kathleen, were allowed to nominate. They nominated Mike and Nathalie. Sandra was nominated because of her failed task.; On Day 9, Big Boss Sandra saved Mike and replaced him with Kenny.; On Day 9, Kenny, Nathalie and Sandra faced the public vote.
Week 2
Week 2	Entrances	On Day 9, Joel entered the house.
Week 2	Tasks	On Day 10, the housemates were given their second weekly task, involving steps.
Week 2	Secrets	On Day 12, Javier got the task to tell a murder story to other housemates.
Week 2	Highlights	On Day 13, Bart proposed to Nathalie, who said "yes".
Week 2	Punishments	On Day 14, angry because other housemates hid his slippers, Javier destroyed one of the windows. He was banned by Big Brother to the loft.; On Day 16, Big Brother punished Javier to stay in a cage in the garden and to be dependent on the goodwill of his other housemates. The other housemates refused the punishment and thought it was too easy after aggressive behaviour. An, and other housemates, threatened to leave the house. Big Brother gave the housemates the choice if they wanted Javier to give another chance in the house. The housemates unanimously refused Javier a second chance, effecting his expulsion from the house.
Week 2	Exits	On Day 16, Javier was forced to leave the house.; On Day 16, Nathalie was evicted from the house.
Week 3
Week 3	Highlights	On Day 16, Big Boss David and Bart became the secret duo Snip and Snap who did secret pranks with other housemates. They wrote See you. Javier with razor foam on the bathroom mirror.
Week 3	Tasks	On Day 17, housemates were given a weekly task, which involved pregnancy tasks. They made a pregnancy fitness video, danced as teddy bears, played babies and mothers (baby An and mother Haris, baby Kevin and mother Joel, and baby Sandra and mother Kathleen), sorted out 6000 kg sugar beans and sing for expecting Kathleen.
Week 3	Nominations	On Day 19, An, Evi and Sandra received the most nominations and faced the public vote.
Week 3	Exits	On Day 23, Evi was evicted from the house. Evi got the choice; stay and one of the evicted housemates return or leave and nobody return. Evi was afraid Javier would be the housemate returning so she chose to leave.
Week 4
Week 4	Tasks	On Day 24, housemates were given a task: to find a nail in a haystack.; On Day 26, housemates had to lead a ring over a spiral.; On Day 28, housemates had to fish ducks in the pond.; On Day 29, Kirsten got to organize a Upperdare party for the female housemates in the loft. The male housemates could watch them on a television screen.
Week 4	Secrets	On Day 24, Mike got a nail in the Diary Room and the choice: "find" it in the haystack and the group wins 60% budget, or keep the nail and win a free pass for the next nominations. Mike took the nail and hides it for putting it later in the haystack.; On Day 25, Sandra was informed by Big Brother about Mike's nail. She stole the nail, put it in the haystack and "found" it.; On Day 26, Kirsten got the task to boycott her team for the ring over spiral task.
Week 4	Nominations	On Day 26, Joël and Mike received the most nominations and faced the public vote.
Week 4	Exits	On Day 30, Joël was evicted from the house.
Week 5
Week 5	Tasks	On Day 32, housemates received their shopped merchandise but it was locked in a cage. They could open the cage by solving riddles.; On Day 35, the male housemates had to make the Big Brother logo in metal.
Week 5	Secrets	On Day 32, Bart received the task to act like he got electrical shocks if housemates got a riddle wrong.; On Day 35, David had to share his secret. He was caught stealing once when he was a teenager.; On Day 36, the male housemates did a strip act. They were watched by mothers and grandmothers from the loft.
Week 5	Nominations	On Day 33, An, Kathleen and Mike received the most nominations and faced the public vote.
Week 5	Exits	On Day 37, Kathleen was evicted from the house.
Week 6
Week 6	Tasks	On Day 38, the house was completely wrapped in plastic for the next task.
Week 6	Highlights	On Day 39, Sandra asked for a pregnancy test in the Diary Room. She had to admit she had been intimate with Kevin. Exceptionally, she could phone home. Her boyfriend and father advised her to leave the house. Her brother advised her to stay. Sandra stayed.; On Day 44, the housemates performed the song "Welkom in het Big Big Brother-huis", a cover-version of Clouseau, written by David and Kevin.
Week 6	Secrets	On Day 24, Mike got a nail in the Diary room and the choice: "Find" it in the haystack and the group wins 60% budget, or keep the nail and win a free pass for the next nominations. Mike took the nail and hides it for putting it later in the haystack.; On Day 25, Sandra was informed by Big Brother about Mike's nail. She stole the nail, put it in the haystack and "found" it.; On Day 26, Kirsten got the task to boycott her team for the ring over spiral task.
Week 6	Nominations	On Day 40, Kevin and Sandra received the most nominations and faced the public vote.
Week 6	Exits	On Day 44, Sandra was evicted from the house.
Week 7
Week 7	Tasks	On Day 45, the task had to be done in couples.; On Day 46, all housemates, except Big Boss, had to wear boxing gloves.; On Day 47, housemates had to do a tug of war around the swimming pool.
Week 7	Secrets	On Day 46, Kirsten's secret was uncovered, she worked as a receptionist in an erotic pub.; On Day 47, Mike has to steal one of An's bras.
Week 7	Punishments	On Day 46, Audrey and Kirsten stole a bottle of wine from the loft. Big Brother took all the budget from the group which placed the budget at 0%.; On Day 46, removing their boxing gloves to cook, Big Brother punished the housemates by locking them in the garden.
Week 7	Nominations	On Day 47, An and Mike received the most nominations and faced the public vote.
Week 7	Exits	On Day 51, Mike was evicted from the house.
Week 8
Week 8	Tasks	On Day 52, all tasks were in wedding theme; a dance marathon, a soft SM task, creating a Big Brother 2006 cocktail (it was Kirsten's cocktail which was voted the best).; On Day 55, the housemates had to make a painting of themselves.
Week 8	Secrets	On Day 51, Kirstens was informed Bart and Nathalie would marry this week but she had to keep this hidden for Bart.; On Day 52, Kirsten was allowed to tell Kenny about the wedding.; On Day 54, An and Audrey are informed of the wedding by Big Brother. They had to think about pranks for the wedding night.; On Day 55, Haris and Kevin are informed of the wedding. They had to write a speech.; On Day 55, Kenny and Kirsten got the task to decorate the loft for the wedding night.; On Day 55, Kevin had to sit in a (wedding) boat, floating in the swimming pool. He could earn a wedding gift for Bart and Nathalie.
Week 8	Nominations	On Day 54, An, Audrey, Haris and Kevin received the most nominations. Big Boss Kenny changed An for David. Audrey, David, Haris and Kevin faced the public vote.
Week 8	Punishments	On Day 54, because Kevin didn't go dancing at the dance marathon when the music started playing, Kirsten had to give all her make-up to Big Brother.
Week 8	Highlights	On Day 58, Bart was informed in the Diary Room it was his wedding day. He chooses Haris as his witness. They were allowed to leave the house. The remaining housemates decorate the house. An and Kenny made a wedding cake. There was a live-stream for the other housemates of the civil wedding of Bart and Nathalie. Afterward, Bart and his bride Nathalie, and witness Haris returned to the house. After the wedding night, Nathalie left the house the next day.
Week 8	Exits	On Day 58, Audrey was evicted from the house.
Week 9
Week 9	Tasks	On Day 59, Kenny became the mole of Big Brother and had to make six tasks for David, Haris and Kevin; On Day 58, An has to go on diet by orders of Big Brother. Her task succeeded.; On Day 59, the housemates got dilemmas offered. Almost every dilemma is refused. Only An accepts her, painting a portrait of Kenny naked.; On Day 62, David and Kenny got the task to ignore Haris.; On Day 63, the housemates had to eat food without using their hands.; On Day 63, An has to do a standup-comedy. She got help from David. She failed the task since she couldn't write anything.; On Day 64, the housemates have to fill 1000 balloons.
Week 9	Secrets	On Day 62, Bart had to tell that David, Haris and Kenny were the nominated housemates.
Week 9	Nominations	On Day 61, An, Haris, Kevin and Kirsten received the most nominations. Big Boss Bart changed Haris for himself. An, Bart, Kevin and Kirsten faced the public vote.
Week 9	Punishments	On Day 64, Bart, David, Haris and Kenny were punished because they made too much noise the night before. They had to give all chocolate and confiture.
Week 9	Exits	On Day 65, An was evicted from the house.
Week 10
Week 10	Tasks	On Day 66, the housemates are informed of the new task. Every day they had to wear something: wooden shoes, webbings, rollerblades, skis...; On Day 67, the housemates could earn a gift for ex-housemate Kathleen's baby by pricking balloons.; On Day 71, the housemates had to cover the floor of the house with yellow post-its.
Week 10	Secrets	On Day 69, Kevin had to act like he was poisoned.
Week 10	Nominations	On Day 68, Kenny and Kirsten received the most nominations and faced the public vote.
Week 10	Punishments	On Day 64, Bart, David, Haris and Kenny were punished because they made too much noise the night before. They had to give all chocolate and confiture.
Week 10	Exits	On Day 72, Kenny was evicted from the house.
Week 11
Week 11	Tasks	On Day 73, the housemates were blinded with ski-glasses.; On Day 74, Kevin and Kirsten had to live in a caravan in the garden.; On Day 74, there was a dance competition between the housemates in the house and the housemates of the caravan. The housemates of the caravan won.; On Day 75, Haris had to wear a straight jacket.; On Day 76, the housemates were handcuffed.; On Day 77, each housemate had to make a dress for Mother's Day.; On Day 78, the housemates had to make a wig of their own hair.
Week 11	Secrets	On Day 73, David, Haris and Kirsten had to steal something from the other housemates while being blinded.; On Day 74, Kevin's secret was unveiled. Some of his past relationships were with female celebrities.; On Day 74, Haris' secret was out. He was fired by his last boss for taking some try-outs of the shop home.
Week 11	Highlights	On Day 75, the housemates could watch a live stream showing ex-housemate Kathleen with her newborn daughter Xyliana.
Week 11	Nominations	On Day 75, Big Brother changed the rules and housemates had to give three names for nomination. David, Kevin and Kirsten received the most nominations. Big Boss Bart changed David for himself. Bart, Kevin and Kirsten faced the public vote.
Week 11	Exits	On Day 79, Bart was evicted from the house.
Week 12
Week 12	Tasks	On Day 80, the housemates got to search luxury products in a box with nettles.; On Day 81, Haris had to talk Greek the whole day.; On Day 82, the housemates got to climb at a rack to collect luxury products.; On Day 85, there was grass in the garden. The housemates had to cut it and place it in their own bag.
Week 12	Secrets	On Day 80, David had to bring all pictures of the housemates to Big Brother.
Week 12	Punishments	On Day 80, using a gadget to grab the products in the box, Haris had to stand with his bare feet in the box with nettles.
Week 12	Nominations	On Day 82, all housemates were nominated. David, Haris, Kevin and Kirsten faced the public vote.
Week 12	Exits	On Day 86, Haris was evicted from the house.
Week 13
Week 13	Tasks	On Day 87, the housemates had to do an auction each day of some of the things they made this season. The profits went to charity.; On Day 88, the housemates had to find hidden cellphones. Once a cellphone was found, that housemate was awarded luxury. Kirsten won a cocktail outside and a massage from Kürt Rogiers.; On Day 89, David won a glue task and could go to the loft for sunbathing, fitness and a warm bath.; On Day 90, Kirsten won a drinking contest, winning a sunbath.; On Day 91, Kevin won a clothing contest.
Week 13	Exits	On Day 93, Kevin left the house in third place, David left the house as the runner-up, and Kirsten was revealed as the winner of the series.

== Nominations table ==
	Week 2	Week 3	Week 4	Week 5	Week 6	Week 7	Week 8	Week 9	Week 10	Week 11	Week 12	Week 13 Final	
Kirsten	Not; Eligible	Evi, Mike	Joël, Kathleen	Kathleen, Kenny	Kevin, Sandra	Bart, Haris	David, Haris	Haris, Kevin	Haris, Kevin	David, Haris, Kevin	David, Haris	Winner (Day 93)	
David	Not; Eligible	Big; Boss	An, Mike	An, Mike	An, Mike	An, Mike	Audrey, Kevin	An, Kirsten	Kenny, Kirsten	Haris, Kevin, Kirsten	Haris, Kevin	Runner-up (Day 93)	
Kevin	Not; Eligible	Audrey, Evi	Big; Boss	An, Mike	An, Mike	An, Mike	An, Audrey	An, Kirsten	Kenny, Kirsten	Bart, David, Kirsten	Haris, Kirsten	Third place (Day 93)	
Haris	Not; Eligible	Evi, Sandra	Kevin, Sandra	Big; Boss	An, Sandra	An, Mike	An, Kirsten	An, Kirsten	Big; Boss	David, Kevin, Kirsten	Big; Boss	Evicted (Day 86)	
Bart	Not; Eligible	An, Evi	Joël, Kevin	An, Kathleen	Kevin, Sandra	An, Mike	An, Audrey	Big; Boss	Kenny, Kirsten	Big; Boss	Evicted (Day 79)		
Kenny	Not; Eligible	An, Evi	Kevin, Sandra	Kevin, Sandra	Kevin, Sandra	Audrey, Kevin	Big; Boss	Haris, Kevin	Haris, Kevin	Evicted (Day 72)			
An	Not; Eligible	Joël, Kathleen	Joël, Kathleen	Kathleen, Kevin	Kevin, Sandra	Big; Boss	Haris, Kevin	Haris, Kevin	Evicted (Day 65)				
Audrey	Not; Eligible	Evi, Sandra	Joël, Mike	Kenny, Sandra	Big; Boss	Bart, Haris	Haris, Kevin	Evicted (Day 58)					
Mike	Not; Eligible	Audrey, Kevin	Joël, Kevin	Kathleen, Sandra	Kevin, Sandra	Audrey, Kevin	Evicted (Day 51)						
Sandra	Big; Boss	Kathleen, Kenny	An, Mike	An, Mike	An, Kenny	Evicted (Day 44)							
Kathleen	David, Mike	An, Sandra	An, Mike	An, Mike	Evicted (Day 37)								
Joël	Not In; House	An, Sandra	An, Mike	Evicted (Day 30)									
Evi	Mike, Nathalie	Audrey, Kevin	Evicted (Day 23)										
Nathalie	Not; Eligible	Evicted (Day 16)											
Javier	Mike, Nathalie	Ejected (Day 16)											
Notes	23	24	none							25	none		
Big Boss	Sandra	David	Kevin	Haris	Audrey	An	Kenny	Bart	Haris	Bart	Haris	none	
Nominated (Pre-Big Boss)	Mike, Nathalie, Sandra	An, Evi, Sandra	Joël, Mike	An, Kathleen, Mike	Kevin, Sandra	An, Mike	An, Audrey, Haris, Kenny	An, Haris, Kevin, Kirsten	Kenny, Kirsten	David, Kevin, Kirsten	David, Haris, Kevin, Kirsten	David, Kevin, Kirsten	
Saved (by Big Boss)	Mike	none					An	Haris	none	David	none		
Nominated (by Big Boss)	Kenny	none					David	Bart	none	Bart	none		
Against public vote	Kenny, Nathalie, Sandra	An, Evi, Sandra	Joël, Mike	An, Kathleen, Mike	Kevin, Sandra	An, Mike	Audrey, David, Haris, Kevin	An, Bart, Kevin, Kirsten	Kenny, Kirsten	Bart, Kevin, Kirsten	David, Haris, Kevin, Kirsten	David, Kevin, Kirsten	
Ejected	Javier	none											
Evicted	Nathalie; Most votes to evict	Evi; Most votes to evict	Joël; Most votes to evict	Kathleen; Most votes to evict	Sandra; Most votes to evict	Mike; Most votes to evict	Audrey; Most votes to evict	An; Most votes to evict	Kenny; Most votes to evict	Bart; Most votes to evict	Haris; Most votes to evict	Kevin; 15% to win	David; 38% to win
Evicted	Nathalie; Most votes to evict	Evi; Most votes to evict	Joël; Most votes to evict	Kathleen; Most votes to evict	Sandra; Most votes to evict	Mike; Most votes to evict	Audrey; Most votes to evict	An; Most votes to evict	Kenny; Most votes to evict	Bart; Most votes to evict	Haris; Most votes to evict	Kirsten; 47% to win	

=== Notes ===
- ^Note 1: On Day 1 Sandra has given a secret mission to become the most hated housemate and receive the most nominations from her fellow housemates at the first round of nominations. She abandoned her mission and hence failed, and as punishment was automatically up for the public vote. During the first round of nominations, only the housemates from the Secret Room (Evi, Javier and Kathleen) were eligible to nominate.
- ^Note 2: Each week the Big Boss cannot nominate but reserves the right to change the nominations of they like, or alternatively leave them unchanged.
- ^Note 3: Housemates nominated three housemates this week.
