= Big Brother (Belgian TV series) season 3 =

Big Brother
- Season 3
- Presented by: Walter Grootaers; Gerrit De Cock
- No. of days: 105
- No. of housemates: 14
- Winner: Kelly Vandevenne
- Runner-up: Filip Van Den Eynde

Release
- Original network: Kanaal 2
- Original release: 1 September – 15 December 2002

Season chronology
- ← Previous; Season 2 Next → Season 4

Big Brother 3, also known as Big Brother: Anders, was the third season of the Belgian version of Big Brother aired in the Flemish Region of Belgium on Kanaal 2. The show started on 1 September 2002 and finished on 15 December 2002 with a total duration of 106 days. Kelly Vandevenne won €33,099.

This season had a unique concept. In comparison with previous seasons, the house was very luxurious, each housemate had its own budget and tasks were diverse in time and place (since there were outdoor tasks). Big Brother also added a mole. Halfway through the season, the nomination system was changed. 14 housemates participated this season, only one housemate was removed.

The live shows got less ratings than previous seasons. The highlights shows often got more than 500,000 views. 892,000 viewers watched the final. Producers called it their best season yet. The fourth season was announced during the final.

== Format ==
This season had a completely different format as the previous first and second season. Abandoning the Back to Basics concept, the house became much more luxurious. The interior was reshaped by interior specialist Erik Vernieuwe. The garden was covered but a Jacuzzi, tanning bed and fitness equipment were added.

The producers wanted a unique format for Flanders. The tag line of the season was Vergeet wat je weet (Forget everything you know), adding the subtitle anders (lit. different).

There were many differences:

- No losers: There wasn't only one winner. Each housemate had their own budget. The remaining budget was given to the housemate when they evicted.
- No isolation: There were VIP guests during the Saturday live stream and there were also outdoor tasks.
- No trust: Big Brother had a mole in the house who had a secret identity and secret missions.
- Tasks: No weekly tasks anymore but tasks of one or more days. Tasks could be individual or in group or for all housemates. The results of the tasks weren't for the group budget (that didn't exist anymore) but for the individual of the participating housemates.
- Halfway through the season, the nomination system changed. The audience made their nomination and the remaining housemates evicted one of the nominated housemates.

== Housemates ==
Name	Age on entry	Hometown	Occupation	Day entered	Day exited	Result
Kelly Vandevenne	26	Sint-Truiden	cook	1	106	Winner
Filip Van Den Eynde	26	Sint-Niklaas	bar manager	1	106	Runner-up
Anick Berghmans	22	Lommel	sports instructor	1	106	3rd Place
Peter Schrijvers	29	Sint-Lenaarts	computer scientist	1	106	4th Place
Heidi Zutterman	24	Bruges	waitress	1	99	Evicted
Davy Van de Voorde	23	Bruges	employee	1	92	Evicted
Bianca Claesen	22	Tongeren	employer dancing	1	85	Evicted
Bert Spencer	23	Lint	student	1	78	Evicted
Hanz Brandt	23	Turnhout	DJ	1	71	Evicted
Sabrina Vanderstappen	23	Diest	waitress	1	57	Evicted
Ester Blockx	22	Leuven	communication scientist	1	43	Evicted
Wino Feremans	31	Winksele	pub manager	1	29	Evicted
Jolie M'Polo-Zita	22	Neerlinter	carer of the disabled	1	27	Ejected
Siska Leten	21	Blankenberge	student	1	15	Evicted

== Weekly summary ==
Week1
Week1	Twists	On Day 1, 4 groups of possible housemates were dropped somewhere in Flanders. They had to get to the Big Brother house before 8 pm to become official housemates. Group 1 was Hanz, Heidi and Kelly. Group 2 was Anick, Davy, Sabrina and Wino. Group 3 was Filip, Jolie and Siska. Group 4 was Bert, Bianca, Ester and Peter.; On Day 1, the audience was informed there was a mole in the Big Brother house.; On Day 3, the audience was informed the mole was Kelly.
Week1	Entrances	On Day 1, all groups enter the house in time.
Week1	Tasks	On Day 1, the housemates had the task of untangling plasticine.; On Day 4, the housemates have to stay as long as possible in a golden cage. It was Bert who left the cage last on Day 6.
Week1	Outdoor Tasks	On Day 1, Anick and Hanz got the first outdoor task. They had to go to Bonn and survive for two days. They only received a mobile home. They did household tasks to earn some money.
Week1	Guest(s)	On Day 7, Betty Owczarek, the housemate from the first season with her newlywed husband visited the house. The housemates had to write a song for the couple.
Week1	Nominations	On Day 8, Jolie, Sabrina, Siska and Wino received the most nominations. Wino was saved by the audience. Jolie, Sabrina and Siska faced the public vote.
Week 2
Week 2	Punishments	On Day 9, after the live show there was an interview with a housemate at Q-Music from outside the house without the approval of the Big Brother producers. Wino was put in the isolation cell to reveal where his mobile phone was hidden. After a day Wino admitted it was a prerecorded interview and Wino was allowed to leave the cell.
Week 2	Tasks	On Day 9, the male housemates had to pamper the female housemates. Davy was voted as best pamperer.; On Day 10, all of the female housemates had to pamper Davy. He voted Bianca as the best pamperer.; On Day 11, the housemates had to eat by licking a giant lollipop. The housemates refused the task.; On Day 13, the group was split into two teams. They had to keep their air balloons in the air.
Week 2	Guest(s)	On Day 14, Big Brother VIPs 1 winner Sam Gooris visited the house. The housemates had to do a karaoke contest. Gooris voted Anick the winner of the contest.
Week 2	Exits	On Day 15, Siska was evicted from the house.
Week 3
Week 3	Tasks	On Day 16, the housemates had to perform six circus acts.; On Day 17, the housemates had to learn to turn around with a kano.
Week 3	Highlights	On Day 17, Kelly and Wino formed Chip and Dale a secret duo that did pranks with their fellow housemates.; On Day 22, Bert refused to give a reason why he nominated Hanz and Wino. Big Brother locked the Diary Room unless Bert gives an explanation. During the whole Live Show, Bert was in the Diary Room. After 16 hours and still not giving an explanation, Big Brother released Bert.
Week 3	Guest(s)	On Day 21, Viola Willis visited the house. The housemates got a Studio 54 party.
Week 3	Nominations	On Day 22, Bianca, Heidi, Jolie and Sabrina received the most nominations. Sabrina was saved by the audience. Bianca, Heidi and Jolie faced the public vote.
Week 4
Week 4	Tasks	On Day 23, the housemates were blindfolded for their next task and had to stay that way for 24h.; On Day 27, the housemates had to all kinds of physical tasks. On Day 28 it was revealed that Anick, Bert, Davy, Filip, Heidi, Kelly and Peter were the 7 fittest housemates. They got a training scheme for a secret mission.
Week 4	Punishments	On Day 24, Jolie and Wino got punished for whispering. They had to stay blindfolded for a longer time. Jolie refused and took off her blind glasses.; On Day 25, following an argument Jolie bit Davy's ear.; On Day 26: Big Brother punished Jolie by putting her in the isolation cell. After some time she left the cell on her own to get some food. Big Brother called her to the Diary Room saying she lost all chances and she was removed from the house. Jolie refused to leave the house. Big Brother called it an emergency situation: the lightning started to flicker and there was no warm water anymore. Other housemates talked with Jolie who accepted to leave the Big Brother house.
Week 4	Guest(s)	On Day 28, Gella Vandecaveye and Jean-Marie De Decker visited the house. The housemates had judo training.
Week 4	Nominations	On Day 29, there were new nominations following Jolie's removal. Bianca, Heidi & Wino received the most nominations. Heidi was saved by the audience. Heidi and Wino faced the public vote.
Week 5
Week 5	Tasks	On Day 30, the housemates had to carve pumpkins.; On Day 32, the housemates had to train to redo Michael Jackson's Thriller.
Week 5	Guest(s)	On Day 35, the group M-Kids visited the house and had to criticize the Thriller dance act of the housemates.
Week 5	Exits	On Day 36, Wino was evicted from the house.
Week 6
Week 6	Tasks	On Day 37, housemates were given a task to build toy trains.; On Day 38, all of the male housemates received the mission to stay silent. If one of them talks, all females would be nominated. On Day 39, Davy talks to Hanz, leading to all of the female housemates nominated.; On Day 40, the housemates had to create artworks.
Week 6	Guest(s)	On Day 42, Jean-Marie Pfaff visited the house to buy the artworks of the housemates.
Week 6	Nominations	On Day 43, next to all the female housemates nominated because of the failed task, Bert, Davy, Hanz and Kelly received the most nominations. Bert was saved by the audience. Anick, Bianca, Davy, Ester, Heidi and Hanz faced the public vote.
Week 7
Week 7	Tasks	On Day 44, housemates were given their task, skating. On Day 46, Anick, Davy, Heidi and Sabrina skated well.
Week 7	Outdoor Tasks	On Day 46, a team of seven housemates left for their secret mission.; On Day 47, the mission is revealed; swim from Belgium to the United Kingdom. After some hours the task failed because Davy and Kelly had seasickness and the other housemates became hypothermic.
Week 7	Guest(s)	On Day 49, Martine Jonckheere visited the house to judge the scenes the housemates had to play.
Week 7	Exits	On Day 50, Ester was evicted from the house.
Week 8
Week 8	Tasks	On Day 51, the housemates were given a shooting task. Bianca and Sabrina win the task on Day 53.; On Day 53, the female housemates received riddles. For each riddle they couldn't solve, a male housemate was nominated.
Week 8	Guest(s)	On Day 53, Tess and Gina from JIMtv visited the house to have a screentest of the housemates. Also Twarre and Isabelle A visited the house to perform.
Week 8	Twists	On Day 57, Big Brother revealed to the housemates, there was a mole in the house. Housemates could start to guess the identity of the mole.
Week 8	Nominations	On Day 57, Bert, Davy, Filip, Hanz, Heidi, Kelly and Sabrina received the most nominations. Kelly was saved by the audience. Bert, Davy, Filip, Hanz, Heidi, Kelly and Sabrina faced the public vote.
Week 9
Week 9	Tasks	On Day 58, the task involved hanging from a cable.; On Day 61, the task was rope-skipping. On Day 62, the task failed.
Week 9	Twists	On Day 58, Kelly did the first guess for the identity of the mole and said nothing.
Week 9	Outdoor Tasks	On Day 60, Bianca and Sabrina got a Halloween task. Davy, Filip and Kelly got the task to scare the two housemates.
Week 9	Guest(s)	On Day 63, Francesca Vanthielen visited the house to give some lessons about tango. She voted Anick and Peter the best pair.
Week 9	Exits	On Day 64, Sabrina was evicted from the house.; On Day 64, the nominations system changed. The audience would from now on be nominating, and the housemates evicting.
Week 10
Week 10	Tasks	On Day 65, the task was running in a wheel.; On Day 67, the housemates have to imitate each other.
Week 10	Twists	On Day 65, Filip made the guess for the identity of the mole and said Heidi.
Week 10	Guest(s)	On Day 70, Sergio Quisuater visited the house to organize a boxing contest. He voted Davy the champion.
Week 10	Exits	On Day 71, Bianca, Davy and Hanz received the most nominations of the audience. Hanz was evicted by the housemates.
Week 11
Week 11	Tasks	On Day 72, the housemates had to hang wallpaper in the house which they failed.; On Day 73, the housemates had a Spider-Man task.; On Day 74, the housemates did tasks for the charity Levenslijn.
Week 11	Outdoor Tasks	On Day 72, Heidi and Peter had to play a rugby match.
Week 11	Guest(s)	On Day 77, Stefan Everts visited the house to organize a motocross. Anick won and could have a motocross ride with Everts.
Week 11	Exits	On Day 78, Bert, Davy and Heidi received the most nominations of the audience. Bert was evicted by the housemates.
Week 12
Week 12	Tasks	On Day 79, the housemates got divided into two groups to build a rocket.; On Day 81, the housemates had to design clothes.
Week 12	Twists	On Day 80, Bert made the guess for the identity of the mole and said Bianca.; On Day 81, Big Brother placed the Big Brother magazine with Kelly and the title mole of Big Brother in the house. Mole Kelly had one week to convince the other housemates she wasn't the mole.
Week 12	Guest(s)	On Day 84, models Joke Van de Velde and Els Thibeau visited the house to judge their designed clothes. They voted for Heidi to be the best designer.
Week 12	Exits	On Day 85, Anick, Bianca and Heidi received the most nominations of the audience. Bianca was evicted by the housemates.
Week 13
Week 13	Twists	On Day 85, nobody discovered Kelly as a mole, therefore, Kelly became a normal housemate.
Week 13	Tasks	On Day 86, the housemates had to learn how to play and sing The Rolling Stones song Satisfaction.
Week 13	Highlights	On Day 87, Davy and Peter create the rock band Frankie and Marcel which performed rock songs.
Week 13	Guest(s)	On Day 91, artist and singer Ronny Mosuse visited the house and the housemates performed the song Satisfaction.
Week 13	Exits	On Day 92, Anick, Davy and Heidi received the most nominations of the audience. Davy was evicted by the housemates.
Week 14
Week 14	Tasks	On Day 93, each housemate got a dog to train an act.; On Day 95, the housemates have to undig the skeleton, Patrick.
Week 14	Guest(s)	On Day 98, Housemate of season 1 Freaky Frank visited the house and organized a race.
Week 14	Exits	On Day 99, Anick, Heidi and Peter received the most nominations of the audience. Heidi was evicted by the housemates.
Week15
Week15	Tasks	On Day 100, the housemates had to do stunts during the final week. Anick and Peter succeeded in the plane stunt.; On Day 101, the housemates had to a laster stunt, which was won by Anick.; On Day 102, the stunt was racing. Kelly was the winner.; On Day 103, the housemates have to keep their balance. Filip won this stunt.
Week15	Guest(s)	On Day 105, singers Belle Perez and Kate Ryan visited the house to throw a final party.
Week15	Exits	On Day 106, Peter left the house in fourth place, Anick in third place, Filip left the house as the runner-up, and Kelly was revealed as the winner of the season.

== Nominations table ==
	Week 2	Week 4	Week 6	Week 8	Week 10	Week 11	Week 12	Week 13	Week 14	Week 15	Week 16 Final	
Kelly	Jolie, Siska	Bianca, Filip	Filip, Hanz	Davy, Filip	Heidi, Sabrina	Hanz	Heidi	Heidi	Heidi	Heidi	Winner (Day 106)	
Filip	Jolie, Siska	Jolie, Wino	Bianca, Sabrina	Davy, Kelly	Heidi, Sabrina	Davy	Bert	Heidi	Heidi	Heidi	Runner-up (Day 106)	
Anick	Siska, Wino	Jolie, Sabrina	Davy, Heidi	Davy, Peter	Heidi, Sabrina	Davy	Davy	Bianca	Davy	Heidi	Third place (Day 106)	
Peter	Sabrina, Siska	Bianca, Sabrina	Bianca, Wino	Davy, Kelly	Kelly, Sabrina	Bianca	Bert	Bianca	Davy	Heidi	Fourth place (Day 106)	
Heidi	Jolie, Siska	Hanz, Jolie	Bianca, Hanz	Davy, Hanz	Bianca, Kelly	Hanz	Bert	Bianca	Davy	Anick	Evicted (Day 99)	
Davy	Bert, Siska	Bert, Ester	Bert, Heidi	Bert, Hanz	Anick, Heidi	Hanz	Bert	Bianca	Anick	Evicted (Day 92)		
Bianca	Hanz, Siska	Bert, Kelly	Ester, Wino	Bert, Hanz	Kelly, Peter	Davy	Heidi	Heidi	Evicted (Day 85)			
Bert	Hanz, Wino	~~Hanz,~~; ~~Wino~~	Hanz, Wino	Davy, Hanz	Kelly, Peter	Hanz	Davy	Evicted (Day 78)				
Hanz	Siska, Wino	Heidi, Jolie	Bianca, Heidi	Bert, Davy	Bianca, Heidi	Davy	Evicted (Day 71)					
Sabrina	Ester, Siska	Ester, Heidi	Ester, Wino	Davy, Filip	Anick, Heidi	Evicted (Day 64)						
Ester	Bianca, Sabrina	Davy, Hanz	Bianca, Davy	Hanz, Kelly	Evicted (Day 50)							
Wino	Jolie, Siska	Bianca, Sabrina	Bianca, Heidi	Evicted (Day 36)								
Jolie	Sabrina, Siska	Heidi, Peter	Ejected (Day 27)									
Siska	Davy, Jolie	Evicted (Day 15)										
Notes	none	1	none	2	3	4	5	none				
Public Nominations	none					Bianca, Davy, Hanz	Bert, Davy, Heidi	Anick, Bianca, Heidi	Anick, Davy, Heidi	Anick, Heidi, Peter	none	
Housemate Nominations	Jolie, Sabrina, Siska, Wino	Bianca, Heidi, Jolie, Sabrina	Bianca, Heidi, Wino	Anick, Bert, Bianca, Davy, Ester, Hanz, Heidi, Kelly, Sabrina	Bert, Davy, Filip, Hanz, Heidi, Kelly, Sabrina	none					Anick, Filip, Kelly, Peter	
Saved	Wino	Sabrina	Bianca	Bert	Kelly	none					Anick, Filip, Kelly, Peter	
Housemate Nominations (Post Competition)	Jolie, Sabrina, Siska	Bianca, Heidi, Jolie	Heidi, Wino	Anick, Bianca, Davy, Ester, Hanz, Heidi, Kelly, Sabrina	Bert, Davy, Filip, Hanz, Heidi, Sabrina	none					Anick, Filip, Kelly, Peter	
Ejected	none	Jolie	none									
Evicted	Siska; Most votes to evict	Eviction; Cancelled	Wino; Most votes to evict	Ester; Most votes to evict	Sabrina; Most votes to evict	Hanz & Davy; Tied vote (4-4-1)	Bert; 4 of 8 votes to evict	Bianca; 4 of 7 votes to evict	Davy; 3 of 6 votes to evict	Heidi; 4 of 5 votes to evict	Peter; 11.6% to win	Anick; 19.5% to win
Evicted	Siska; Most votes to evict	Eviction; Cancelled	Wino; Most votes to evict	Ester; Most votes to evict	Sabrina; Most votes to evict	Hanz; Most votes to evict	Bert; 4 of 8 votes to evict	Bianca; 4 of 7 votes to evict	Davy; 3 of 6 votes to evict	Heidi; 4 of 5 votes to evict	Filip; 23.5% to win	Kelly; 45.4% to win

=== Notes ===
- ^Note 1 : Bert's nominations were voided after he did not give sufficient reasons. When Jolie was Ejected for rule-breaking the Eviction for this Week was cancelled.
- ^Note 2 : All the girls (Anick, Bianca, Ester, Heidi and Sabrina) were automatically Nominated for Eviction after losing a task against the boys. During Nominations Housemates were only allowed to nominate male Housemates to join the females in the Nomination line-up. Bert, Davy, Hanz and Kelly were nominated, but Bert won Immunity.
- ^Note 3 : Bert, Davy, Hanz and Filip were automatically Nominated this Week after they failed their part in the task. During Nominations Housemates could not nominate any of these Housemates.
- ^Note 4 : This week the Public nominated and the Housemates evicted. Bianca, Davy and Hanz received the most votes and face the Housemate Vote. As the vote was a draw between Davy and Hanz, the Housemate with the highest percentage of Public Votes of the two would be evicted. Hanz was the least popular of the two and was hence evicted.
- ^Note 5 : The Public nominated Bert, Davy and Heidi and the Housemates chose to Evict Bert. From now on all Evictions will be done this way.
