= Big Brother (Belgian TV series) season 6 =

Big Brother
- Season 6
- Presented by: Walter Grootaers; Kelly Pfaff
- No. of days: 92
- No. of housemates: 20
- Winner: Diana Ferrante
- Runner-up: Martin Broer

Release
- Original network: KanaalTwee
- Original release: 7 March – 4 June 2007

Season chronology
- ← Previous; Season 5

Big Brother 6, also known as Big Brother: Zero Privacy, was the sixth season of the Belgian version of Big Brother aired in the Flemish Region of Belgium on KanaalTwee.

The show started on 7 March 2007 and finished on 4 June 2007 with a total duration of 92 days. The season started with duos. The concept of "Zero privacy" of last season was extended. A lie detector was installed and the lies of housemates were detected. The season was poorly received. Because of dropping ratings, the producers made changes. Halfway through the season, half of the housemates were evicted in a massive eviction and replaced with new housemates. The duo concept was abandoned after the massive eviction. Two actors were added as housemates to spice things up. The date of the live shows was reverted from Thursday to Monday, like the previous season. The accuracy of the lie detector was also criticized. 22 housemates lived in the house this season, including eight duos and two actors.

Diana Ferrante won €81,000. The original prize was €500,000, but every lie that was told in diary room was the prize cut for €1,000.

285,000 viewers watched the final. There was no call for future housemates and no announcement of a new season. A few weeks later, the producers stated that Big Brother wouldn't be coming back and admitted they made mistakes in creating the concept and casting the housemates of last season.

== Concept ==
This season expanded the concept of "Zero privacy". By having a glasshouse where there were no privacy possible. With the slogan "Zelfs gedachten zijn niet meer vrij" ("Even thinking isn't private anymore"), introduced the lie detector. Unknown by the housemates, a lie detector detected all lies the housemates told. Beginning with a final prize of €500,000, for the winner, every lie that was told in the house, €1,000 from the prize was reduced. A plasma screen in the living area showed reducing money all the time, without the housemates realizing what the screen showed.

The house featured three new rooms. Instead of the baby room from the previous season, there was a shop. There was also a darkroom. The third room was a hidden room for the actors in the house.

== Housemates ==
This season started with duos. Every duo had a connection before Big Brother, except for one duo that was put together by Big Brother. Once the massive exit took place and 6 new housemates entered the Big Brother house, the concept of duos was abandoned.

Duo 1 - Husband and wife
Duo 2 - Sisters
Duo 3 - Friends and co-owners pub
Duo 4 - Nieces
Duo 5 - Adoptive father and son
Duo 6 - Ex partners
Duo 7 - Duo 1 formed by Big Brother
Duo 8 - Duo 2 formed by Big Brother

Name		Age on entry	Hometown	Occupation	Day entered	Day exited	Result
	Diana Ferrante	24	Zutendaal, Limburg	Clerk	1	92	Winner
	Martin Broer	29	Ghent, Oost-Vlaanderen	Pub owner	1	92	Runner-up
	Hanne Frederickx	22	Westerlo, Antwerp	Elderly caregiver	2	92	3rd Place
-	Dennis Verbeemen	40	Lummen, Limburg	Metal worker	29	92	4th Place
	Evelien Frederickx	20	Westerlo, Antwerp	Social worker	1	85	Evicted
-	Veronique Houben	21	Lanaken, Limburg	Student communication management	29	78	Evicted
-	Nathalie Stuer	23	Sint-Niklaas, Oost-Vlaanderen	Actress	29	71	Left
-	Johan Albert	28	Antwerp, Antwerpen	Actor	29	65	Left
-	Hendrik	35	Antwerp	Unemployed	29	64	Evicted
	Nicolas Vandenabeele	25	Hoegaarden, Vlaams-Brabant	Marketing consultant	3	57	Evicted
-	Teresa Sansa	27	Maasmechelen, Limburg	Student carer	29	50	Evicted
	Virginie Delamarre	26	Deurne, Antwerp	Stylist	1	43	Evicted
	Astrid Verpooten	19	Ekeren, Antwerp	Student hotel	3	29	Evicted
	Benjamin Bundervoet	31	Oostakker, Oost-Vlaanderen	Pub owner	2	29	Evicted
	Dimitri De Witte	20	Zelzate, Oost-Vlaanderen	Metal worker	2	29	Evicted
	Mario De Witte	33	Zelzate, Oost-Vlaanderen	Metal worker	1	29	Evicted
	Naiomi Herdewel	20	Antwerp	Unemployed	11	29	Evicted
	Roberto Diaz	25	Beringen, Limburg	Unemployed	11	25	Evicted
	Kevin "Mutz" Mutz	25	Dilsen-Stokkem, Limburg	Student trade	1	22	Evicted
	Kevin Van Gansen	27	Deurne, Antwerp	Insurance broker	2	18	Evicted
	Nathalie Loyen	22	Zutendaal, Limburg	Sales representative	2	10	Walked
	Virginie "Ginie" Loyen	21	Zutendaal, Limburg	Sales representative	1	10	Walked

== Weekly summary ==
Week 1
Week 1	Entrances	On Day 1, Virginie, Mario, Evelien, Martin and Ginie entered the house. All their personal belongings were destroyed by masked men. Two of these masked men were Diana and Mutz, secret housemates. Diana and Mutz stayed hidden in the loft.; On Day 2, the housemates had to abduct their partners. Kevin, Dimitri, Hanne, Benjamin, Hanne and Nathalie were kidnapped and brought into the house.; On Day 4, Astrid and Nicolas entered the house. Diana recognized from the loft her ex Nicolas.
Week 1	Task	On Day 5, housemates were given their first task, it's the week of terror, involving a mousetrap where they had to save Nicolas, baths with cockroaches, crabs, earthworms, millipedes and scorpions where a duo has to sit in, a black box where a housemate had to sit in, standing on a rack that was electrically charged when a siren sounded,...
Week 1	Punishments	On Day 7, Nathalie and Ginie were punished because they peeked during the blinded task. They were locked up in a darkroom on water and bread. Virginie started hyperventilating and kicked the door open.; On Day 7, Ginie received a new punishment, being locked up in a small iron cage. Ginie accepted.; On Day 9, Nathalie and Ginie stole food from Big Brother's shop. Big Brother announced the worth of the food was stripped from the group budget.; On Day 11, Naiomi and Roberto entered the house.
Week 1	Highlights	On Day 8, Astrid was introduced in the Diary Room to her partner, the former secret housemate Mutz. Nicolas was introduced to his partner, his ex-girlfriend Diana.
Week 1	Exits	On Day 14, the pair Ginie and Nathalie left the house voluntarily.
Week 1	Nominations	On Day 11, the pairs nominated. Astrid and Kevin received the most nominations and faced the public vote.
Week 2
Week 2	Tasks	On Day 12, the housemates were given their second weekly task. Two containers were placed. In group 1 were Virginie, Diana, Dimitri and Benjamin who had to do exercises to give power to the luxury installation in the other container where group 2 -their partners- were. Group 2 had to keep this hidden for group 1.; On Day 13, an electric maze was made in the garden.; On Day 14, the housemates had to a contest in balancing. Nicolas won and earned a massage.; On Day 15, the housemates received a climbing wall. Climbing the wall could earn some telephone time for the future.; On Day 16, the housemates were divided into two teams and had to break five windows. Martin won and earned 30 sec to phone.
Week 2	Exits	On Day 18, Kevin was evicted from the house.
Week 3
Week 3	Tasks	On Day 19, housemates had to keep a carousel turning as a task, possibly earning them 50% budget.; On Day 22, housemates had to blow 5000 balloons and afterward pricking them in less than ten minutes. The hidden codes in the balloons could earn prices.; On Day 23, housemates could earn phone credit by letting pigeons eat from them.; On Day 23, Dimitri earned a Guinness Record by wearing 167 T-shirts. If not doing it, the group would have lost 50% of its budget.
Week 3	Punishments	On Day 21, Hanne was punished because she told the housemates about the secret task last week. She was locked in the darkroom. Evelien freed her. To punish Evelien, Big Brother took Eveliens Big Boss-title.
Week 3	Exits	On Day 22, all of the female housemates had to vote one of the male housemates out. Mutz was chosen and left the house.; On Day 25, female housemates had to choose three male housemates they definitely wanted to stay with. They choose Dimitri, Martin and Benjamin. The three male housemates had to evict one of the other males. Roberto was chosen and left the house.
Week 4
Week 4	Tasks	On Day 26, housemates had to keep the water in a ton, they failed and lost 100% of the budget.; On Day 27, housemates had to play darts in teams.; On Day 27, housemates had to stick feathers onto themselves. In a cage, a ventilator was directed to them. If more than 80 feathers would be on them by the end of the task, they earned 20% budget.; On Day 28, housemates had to strip clothespins for a 20% budget and a sticker task for 25%.; On Day 29, housemates had to melt a tablet of soap for a 15% budget.
Week 4	Exits	On Day 29, the Big Exit took place. Group 1 had lost. Mario, Dimitri, Astrid, Benjamin and Naiomi left the house.
Week 4	Entrances	On Day 29, Dennis, Hendrik, Johan, Teresa and Veronique entered the house.
Week 5
Week 5	Tasks	On Day 30, housemates had to play cat and mouse at trampolines.; On Day 30, housemates had to play dog and boss: dog Johan & boss Virginie, dog Teresa and boss Nicolas and dog Diana and boss Dennis.; On Day 31, housemates had to play frisbee.; On Day 32, Nicolas had to replay the crucifixion of Jesus.; On Day 32, housemates could win letters from home by holding an aquarium. They succeeded.; On Day 33, housemates had to throw vegetables and catch those on a sauté.; On Day 35, housemates had to search for Easter eggs with paintball bullets, dressed as Easter bunnies.
Week 5	Punishments	On Day 34, Teresa and Veronique told the other female housemates about the perception of the outside world on them. They are punished by Big Brother and have to deliver 25 pieces of their clothes.; On Day 35, Big Brother turned off the hot water because Teresa destroyed (accidentally) a camera.
Week 5	Secrets	On Day 35, Nathalie got the secret mission to fake sickness to be able to leave the house.; On Day 35, Johan got the secret mission to find a key in the house, it was the key for a secret room - only for Nathalie and him to use. It was a room where there's a computer to chat with Big Brother.
Week 5	Nominations	On Day 36, An, the old housemates had to name one of the new housemates put up for eviction. They named Hendrik. The new housemates had to nominate one of the old housemates and named Virginie. Hendrik and Virginie faced the public vote.
Week 6
Week 6	Tasks	On Day 37, housemates had to make a kano from a tree in less than five days, to earn 75% of the budget. They passed.
Week 6	Secrets	On Day 38, Johan got the task to do something wrong to get a punishment from Big Brother. Thanks to the punishment he was able to see his girlfriend in the darkroom.; On Day 41, Nathalie had to tell the lie Martin had sex with Veronique in the loft. She told Teresa but she didn't believe it.; On Day 41, Johan got the task to write a new Big Brother song. He had the task to reject all the other ideas of the other housemates.; On Day 43, Johan had to cut one of the strings of his guitar and get mad about it.
Week 6	Exits	On Day 43, Virginie was evicted from the house.
Week 7
Week 7	Tasks	On Day 44, housemates had to cover the house completely in post-its, they passed and earned 15% of the budget.; On Day 47, Diana and Nathalie had to create a dance to be done on treadmills.
Week 7	Secrets	On Day 48, Johan got the task to get very angry at Big Brother. It seemed he was punished to be two days in the darkroom while Johan went outside to train with his music band.; On Day 50, Nathalie had to act like she was bisexual.
Week 7	Nominations	On Day 46, Teresa, Dennis, Hanne, Nicolas, Nathalie, Johan and Véronique received the most nominations. Since Johan and Nathalie were actors they couldn't be evicted. Teresa, Dennis, Hanne, Nicolas and Véronique faced the public vote.
Week 7	Exits	On Day 50, Teresa was evicted from the house.
Week 8
Week 8	Tasks	On Day 51, housemates had to make a 10 x 5m hammock. During the last night, all housemates had to lie in the hammock together for 8,5 hours. They succeeded.; On Day 52, housemates had to make 500-liter soup for the homeless people.
Week 8	Secrets	On Day 52, Nathalie had a scripted dialogue in the Diary Room in which she insulted other housemates. Evelien, Diana and Véronique heard the dialogue in the darkroom.; On Day 54, Nathalie had to gain the trust of Hendrik.
Week 8	Nominations	On Day 53, Johan and Nathalie received the most nominations. Since they were actors, they couldn't be nominated. Diana and Nicolas also received one vote. Diana and Nicolas faced the public vote.
Week 8	Highlights	On Day 53, Véronique was offered the choice: take 10.000 euro and make the budget for the next three weeks an emergency budget. Or keep the budget as it is and leave the money. Véronique took the money.; On Day 57, Diana's boyfriend proposed from behind a glass wall. Diana accepted.
Week 8	Exits	On Day 57, Nicolas was evicted from the house.
Week 9
Week 9	Tasks	On Day 58, housemates had to make a mosaic from the Swedish flag and the logo of Big Brother with Läkerols, to win 50% of the budget.
Week 9	Highlights	On Day 58, Big Boss Dennis is informed the budget was 0% because of a voluntary choice of one of the housemates.
Week 9	Secrets	On Day 52, Nathalie received a fake video-message of her girlfriend who breaks up.; On Day 62, Johan and Nathalie had to have a fight about Evelien's nomination.
Week 9	Nominations	On Day 60, Evelien, Hendrik and (actor) Johan received the most nominations. Evelien and Hendrik faced the public vote.
Week 9	Exits	On Day 64, Hendrik was evicted from the house.
Week 10
Week 10	Tasks	On Day 65, the housemates had to make their own barbecue and be able to do a barbecue by the end of the week. They passed the task, winning 100% budget.
Week 10	Secrets	On Day 65, Johan was informed about the second week of emergency budget and had to react mad. He had to threaten to destroy personal belongings from housemates if nobody revealed who was the reason for the emergency budget.
Week 10	Highlights	On Day 65, Johan destroyed some of the clothes of the female housemates. The whole group reacted and went to the Diary Room. They forced Big Brother to make a choice: Johan leaving or the other housemates. The housemates had also found a letter with a secret mission for Johan, revealing he was an actor.
Week 10	Exits	On Day 65, actor Johan left the house because of the group rebellion against Big Brother.; On Day 71, actress Nathalie's acting task was finished and she left the house.
Week 10	Nominations	On Day 71, Dennis and Veronique received the most nominations and faced the public vote.
Week 11
Week 11	Tasks	On Day 72, the housemates received the new task, building a Ferris wheel which had to be able to lift four housemates by the next live-show. The percentage of the budget was determined by individual tasks. The Ferris wheel was able to spin but without housemates, which Big Brother agreed to let the housemates pass the task.
Week 11	Exits	On Day 78, Veronique was evicted from the house.
Week 12
Week 12	Tasks	On Day 79, the housemates got the task of building a go-cart and be able to drive with it by the end of the week. The go-cart didn't drive so the task failed.
Week 12	Highlights	On Day 78, the phone rang, announcing the first finalist. Dennis answered the phone which made him the first finalist.
Week 12	Nominations	On Day 81, Diana, Evelien, Hanne, Martin were nominated and faced the public vote.
Week 12	Exits	On Day 85, Evelien was evicted from the house.
Week 13
Week 13	Tasks	On Day 86, the housemates had to tune a Chevrolet, in the theme of Death Proof. The Chevrolet was afterward given to one of the viewers.; On Day 86, Dennis got an individual task and was able to meet his family and the mayor of his town.; On Day 86, Hanne won a VIP-meeting at a concert by Clouseau.; On Day 87, Diana could leave the house and go to her town.; On Day 88, Hanne could leave the house and go to her town.; On Day 88, Martin won a vacation to Tunisia.; On Day 89, Dennis won a subscription to KRC Genk.
Week 13	Exits	On Day 93, Dennis left the house in fourth place, Hanne in third. Martin left the house as the runner-up, and Diana was revealed as the winner of the season.

== Nominations table ==
	Week 2	Week 3	Week 4			Week 6	Week 7	Week 8	Week 9	Week 11	Week 12	Week 13 Final	
	Week 2	Week 3	Day 23 to save	Day 23 to evict	Day 27 Big Exit	Week 6	Week 7	Week 8	Week 9	Week 11	Week 12	Week 13 Final	
Diana	Astrid, Hanne	Mutz	Dimitri, Martin, Benjamin	Not eligible	Group 2	Hendrik	Dennis, Nathalie S	Big; Boss	Hendrik, Johan, Veronique	Dennis, Veronique	Hanne, Martin	Winner (Day 90)	
Martin	Astrid, Mutz	Not eligible	Not eligible	Roberto	Group 2	Hendrik	Big; Boss	Johan, Nathalie S	Hendrik, Johan, Nathalie S	Dennis, Veronique	Big; Boss	Runner-up (Day 90)	
Hanne	Big; Boss	Mutz	Dimitri, Martin, Benjamin	Not eligible	Group 2	Hendrik	Johan, Nathalie S	Johan, Nathalie S	Dennis, Hendrik, Johan	Dennis, Veronique	Diana, Martin	Third Place (Day 90)	
Dennis	Not in House					Virginie	Johan, Teresa	Johan, Nathalie S	Big; Boss	Evelien, Hanne	Finalist	Fourth Place (Day 90)	
Evelien	Big; Boss	Mutz	Dimitri, Martin, Benjamin	Not eligible	Group 2	Hendrik	Johan, Nathalie S	Johan, Nathalie S	Dennis, Hendrik, Johan	Dennis, Veronique	Diana, Martin	Evicted (Day 83)	
Veronique	Not in House					Virginie	Big; Boss	Johan, Nathalie S	Evelin, Hendrik, Johan	Evelien, Hanne	Evicted (Day 76)		
Nathalie S	Not in House					Virginie	Big Brother; Mole			Left (Day 69)			
Johan	Not in House					Virginie	Big Brother; Mole			Left (Day 63)			
Hendrik	Not in House					Virginie	Hanne, Nicolas	Diana, Nicolas	Diana, Evelin, Hanne	Evicted (Day 62)			
Nicolas	Astrid, Hanne	Not eligible	Not eligible	Not eligible	Group 2	Hendrik	Dennis, Nathalie S	Big; Boss	Evicted (Day 55)				
Teresa	Not in House					Virginie	Johan, Veronique	Evicted (Day 48)					
Virginie	Astrid, Dimitri	Mutz	Dimitri, Martin, Benjamin	Not eligible	Group 2	Hendrik	Evicted (Day 41)						
Astrid	Kevin, Virginie	Mutz	Dimitri, Martin, Benjamin	Not eligible	Group 1	Evicted (Day 27)							
Benjamin	Astrid, Mutz	Not eligible	Not eligible	Roberto	Group 1	Evicted (Day 27)							
Dimitri	Nicholas, Kevin	Not eligible	Not eligible	Roberto	Group 1	Evicted (Day 27)							
Mario	Nicholas, Kevin	Not eligible	Not eligible	Not eligible	Group 1	Evicted (Day 27)							
Naiomi	Not in House	Mutz	Dimitri, Martin, Benjamin	Not eligible	Group 1	Evicted (Day 27)							
Roberto	Not in House	Not eligible	Not eligible	Not eligible	Evicted (Day 23)								
Mutz	Kevin, Virginie	Not eligible	Evicted (Day 20)										
Kevin	Astrid, Dimitri	Evicted (Day 16)											
Ginie	Walked (Day 8)												
Nathalie	Walked (Day 8)												
Notes	26	27			28	29	30	31	32	33	34	35	
Big Boss	Evelien; Hanne	Evelien	Mario			Martin; Veronique		Diana; Nicolas	Dennis	Hanne	Martin	none	
Nominated for eviction	Astrid, Kevin	Male housemates	Male housemates	Mario, Nicolas, Roberto	Group 1 Astrid; Benjamin; Dimitri; Mario; Naiomi Group 2 Diana; Evelien; Hanne; Martin; Nicolas; Virginie	Hendrik, Virginie	Dennis, Hanne, Nicholas, Teresa, Veronique	Diana, Nicolas	Evelien, Hendrik	Dennis, Veronique	Diana, Evelien, Hanne, Martin	Dennis, Diana, Hanne, Martin	
Walked	Nathalie; Ginie	none											
Evicted	Kevin; Most votes to evict	Mutz; Female housemates' choice to evict	Benjamin, Dimitri & Martin; Female housemates' choice to save	Roberto; Benjamin, Dimitri & Martin's choice to evict	Group 1 Astrid; Benjamin; Dimitri; Mario; Naiomi Most votes to evict	Virginie; Most votes to evict	Teresa; Most votes to evict	Nicolas; Most votes to evict	Hendrik; Most votes to evict	Veronique; Most votes to evict	Evelien; Most votes to evict	Dennis; 15% to win	Hanne; 20% to win
Evicted	Kevin; Most votes to evict	Mutz; Female housemates' choice to evict	Benjamin, Dimitri & Martin; Female housemates' choice to save	Roberto; Benjamin, Dimitri & Martin's choice to evict	Group 1 Astrid; Benjamin; Dimitri; Mario; Naiomi Most votes to evict	Virginie; Most votes to evict	Teresa; Most votes to evict	Nicolas; Most votes to evict	Hendrik; Most votes to evict	Veronique; Most votes to evict	Evelien; Most votes to evict	Martin; 21% to win	Diana; 44% to win

=== Notes ===
^Note 26 : Housemates nominated in pairs - however, they could nominate individual housemates, not the whole couples. Evelin and Hanne were elected "Big Boss" by their fellow housemates - they, therefore, could not nominate, but could be Nominated. Astrid and Kevin received the most Nominations and faced the public vote; as Big Boss, Evelin had the chance to save a nominee and replace them with someone else, but she chose to leave them as they are.
^Note 27 : In a surprise extra eviction on Day 20, the female housemates had to choose as a group a male housemate to be evicted. They narrowed it down to Dimitri, Mario or Mutz and eventually chose Mutz. On Day 23, in another surprise extra eviction, the housemates had to choose another male housemate to be evicted. Firstly, the female housemates had to choose three male housemates to save. They chose Dimitri, Martin, and Benjamin. Then Dimitri, Martin, and Benjamin had to choose which of the remaining three males, Mario, Nicolas, or Roberto, to evict. Dimitri insisted that his father Mario be saved, and so the choice would be either Nicolas or Roberto. They chose to evict Roberto.
^Note 28 : In a world-first, the housemates were divided into two groups - and the groups faced eviction against one another. On Day 27 Group 1 - consisting of Astrid, Benjamin, Demitiri, Mario and Naimoi were elected together and replaced by six brand new housemates - Dennis, Hedrik, Johan, Nathalie S, Teres and Veronique - of which Johan and Nathalie S were moles working from Big Brother. The quintuple eviction happened after falling ratings and complaints that the current housemates were boring.
^Note 29 : In this round of nominations, the housemates were split into two teams - of the New Housemates and Group 2, the survivors of last week's multiple evictions. Each team had to choose one housemate from the opposing group to face the public vote. The Originals chose Hendrik and the Newbies chose Virginie.
^Note 30 : Johan and Nathalie S are moles and therefore cannot nominate, nor be up for eviction; any nominations they receive do not count - however, the housemates were told that they did face the public vote. Diana and Nicholas and Evelien and Hanne, as the only surviving couples nominated together, the rest of the housemates nominated as individuals. Martin and Veronique were Big Boss this week and could not nominate, but could be nominated.
^Note 31 : John and Nathalie S are moles working for Big Brother and cannot nominate, nor be nominated or evicted. Diana and Nicholas were "Big Boss" and could not nominate, but could be nominated. Evelien and Hanne nominated as a couple of bouts could be nominated individually.
^Note 32 : This week housemates had to nominate three housemates to face the public vote. Dennis was "Big Boss" and therefore could not nominate, but could be nominated. John and Nathalie S are moles and therefore cannot be nominated or evicted. Evelien and Hanne were the last couple left and nominated together.
^Note 33 : John and Nathalie S, the Big Brother Moles, left the house when their specified times came to an end. In this week's nominations, Evelien and Hanne nominated together as the last of the couples. There was no "Big Boss" this week as the Big Boss was Nathalie S, but she left the house before the nominations took place.
^Note 34 : Shortly after Veronique's eviction Martin answered the Hot Phone and won immunity to the final. He therefore could not be nominated or be nominated this week. Martin was "Big Boss" and therefore could not nominate, but could be nominated.
^Note 35 : The final four housemates automatically faced the public vote to win.
