= Big Brother (Belgian TV series) season 4 =

Big Brother
- Season 4
- Presented by: Walter Grootaers; Gerrit De Cock
- No. of days: 85
- No. of housemates: 12
- Winner: Kristof Van Camp
- Runner-up: John Cillen

Release
- Original network: KanaalTwee
- Original release: 21 September – 14 December 2003

Season chronology
- ← Previous; Season 3 Next → Season 5

Big Brother 4 is the fourth season of the Belgian version of Big Brother aired in the Flemish Region of Belgium on KanaalTwee.

It was preceded by Big Brother All Stars which made it the shortest regular season in Belgium. The show started on 21 September 2003 and finished on 14 December 2003 with a total duration of 85 days. Kristof Van Camp won €50,000. 12 housemates entered the house during the launch.

This season wasn't as successful as the producers hoped. The whole season was built around a massive exit halfway through the season. Because of bullying and a lot of conflicts, 5 housemates left the house voluntarily. Leaving only 1 housemate being evicted at the massive exit. The season also been criticized for animal abuse. The producers solved this in agreement with the Belgian organization for animal welfare, GAIA, by creating a task for the animal charity.

Ratings dropped in comparison with previous seasons. Daily highlights episodes got 300,000 viewers. The final was watched by 720,000 viewers. After the season, Big Brother was axed for an undetermined time in 2004.

== Format ==
This season was built around a twist, which the producers called the big twist. The season started with the audience nominating their favorite housemates but the housemates would think this would be the least favorite housemates. The housemates would have to evict one of the nominated housemates. Thinking the evicted housemate would leave the Big Brother game, the evicted housemates would actually go to a secret location. After weeks, the housemates would be divided into two groups:

- The first group in the house with the least favorite housemates (believing they would be the most favorite housemates).
- The second group with the favorite (evicted) housemates at the secret location.

Halfway through the season, the twist would be revealed to housemates. Those housemates would have to leave the house immediately in a massive exit. Once they'd left, the favorite housemates could return to the Big Brother house to stay for the rest of the weeks.

== Housemates ==
Name	Age on entry	Hometown	Occupation	Day entered	Day exited	Result
Kristof Van Camp	27	Leuven	pub owner	1	85	Winner
John Cillen	21	Overpelt	student master industrial engineer	1	85	Runner-up
Vanessa Marchant	22	Wilrijk	elderly caregiver	1	85	3rd Place
Mathousca Baeten	23	Aalst	waitress	1	78	Evicted
Douglas Gijselinckx	25	Kapellen	window cleaner	1	64	Evicted
Peggy Thienpont	19	Sint-Amandsberg	coach	1	50	Evicted
Kevin Jansegers	21	Boom	unemployed	1	36	Evicted
Hannes D'Haese	38	Knokke	pub manager & artist	1	35	Walked
Gioia Kortzorg	19	Houthalen-Helchteren	unemployed	1	23	Walked
Katja Vanopdenbosch	24	Winksele	unemployed	1	23	Walked
Tom Bosmans	31	Antwerp	teamleader operations	1	14	Walked
Sadia Abazar	27	Bree	housewife	1	9	Walked

== Weekly summary ==
Week 1
Week 1	Entrances	On Day 1, 12 housemates (out of 15 candidates) were voted by the audience into the house. They were Douglas, Gioia, Hannes, John, Katja, Kevin, Kristof, Mathousca, Peggy, Sadia, Tom and Vanessa.
Week 1	Twist	On Day 1, the audience was informed by the big twist this season. The audience would nominate their favorite housemates. Fellow housemates would evict one of those nominated housemates ( to a secret location unknown to the housemates inside the Big Brother house). The audience could start to vote immediately.
Week 1	Tasks	On Day 1, the housemates were divided into two teams; team Blue and team Red and had to try to get balls as many as possible from the other team. Team captains were Peggy (Blue) and Sadia (Red).
Week 1	Guest(s)	On Day 7, the housemates had to prepare a seventies act for the visitors, singers Nicole and Hungo.
Week 1	Exits	On Day 8, Douglas, John and Kristof received the most nominations from the audience. Kristof is evicted by the housemates. John is evicted as the second one by the housemates.
Week 2
Week 2	Punishments	On Day 9, because Sadia refused to evict one of her housemates, she gets punished by Big Brother. She had to do a dance marathon for 24h. She refused.
Week 2	Tasks	On Day 9, the housemates were divided into pairs. They were put on an overall and had to build the tower of Eiffel in matches. Katja had a free-pass.
Week 2	Guest(s)	On Day 14, the housemates had to prepare a Mayumana act for the visitors, professional judges and Eva Pauwels.
Week 2	Exits	On Day 9, Sadia left the house because she didn't agree to do the punishment of Big Brother.; On Day 14, Tom left the house after a fight. He kicked the exit door open.; On Day 15, Douglas and Mathousca received the most nominations from the audience. Mathousca is evicted by the housemates.
Week 2	Secret location	On Day 8, John and Kristof were informed by the twist. They were moved to the first secret location, a circus. They had to take care of the animals, knit a costume and perform an act on Day 14.; On Day 15, Mathousca joined John and Kristof.
Week 3
Week 3	Tasks	On Day 16, the housemates had a task for the week, the Big Olympics. The housemate with the most medals was Douglas.
Week 3	Guest(s)	On Day 21, the male housemates had to a football match while the female housemates had to do a cheerleading act. The visitors were 3 professional football players.
Week 3	Exits	On Day 22, Douglas and Peggy received the most nominations from the audience. Peggy is evicted by the housemates.
Week 3	Secret location	On Day 16, John, Kristof and Mathousca were moved to the second secret location, a farm. They had to take care of the animals, milk the cows, take care of the vegetables, slaughter a chicken, etc. They also witnessed the birth of three pigs.; On Day 22, Peggy joined the favorite housemates.
Week 4
Week 4	Tasks	On Day 24, the housemates received the task, make their own version of iconic movie scenes.
Week 4	Guest(s)	On Day 28, the housemates had director Stijn Coninckx and actress Anne Somers as visitors. They watched the filmed scenes of the housemates. They awarded Hannes as best actor.
Week 4	Exits	On Day 23, Gioia and Katja left the house voluntarily.; On Day 29, Douglas and Vanessa received the most nominations from the audience. Vanessa is evicted by the housemates.
Week 4	Secret location	On Day 23, John, Kristof, Mathousca and Peggy were moved to the third secret location, the coast. Where they lived with fishermen. They had to find oysters, fish and clean the fishes.; On Day 29, Vanessa joined the favorite housemates.
Week 5
Week 5	Tasks	On Day 31, the three remaining housemates received the task, taking care of the Russian Olga. Olga understood Dutch without knowing the housemates she did.
Week 5	Outdoor tasks	On Day 34, Douglas, Hannes and Kevin did a parachute dropping. Hannes disappeared for some time after landing.
Week 5	Guest(s)	On Day 35, the housemates had the following visitors: artists, The Underdog Project, Big Brovaz and Sita.
Week 5	Exits	On Day 35, Hannes left the house voluntarily because Big Brother refused to play the record Hannes demanded.; On Day 36, Douglas and Kevin were informed of the Big Twist. They were the last remaining housemates and had to leave the house to make room for the return of the favorite housemates.
Week 5	Secret location	On Day 31, John, Kristof, Mathousca, Peggy and Vanessa were moved to the fourth and final secret location, a cowboy village. They had to build their own house, ride a mechanical bull and do a cowboy dance.
Week 5	Entrances	On Day 36, the favorite housemates John, Kristof, Mathousca, Peggy and Vanessa returned and entered the Big Brother house for a second time.; On Day 36, the audience had the choice of voting one of the last remaining housemates, Douglas or Kevin, back into the house. Douglas was voted back in and joined the favorite housemates.
Week 6
Week 6	Tasks	On Day 37, Douglas, Kristof and Peggy had to clear a bomb. They failed.; On Day 39, John, Mathousca and Vanessa had to do a Halloween task. They had to dress as The Addams Family and scare each other, each wearing cardio.
Week 6	Outdoor tasks	On Day 37, John, Mathousca and Vanessa did a survival in Ardennes.; On Day 39, Douglas, Kristof and Peggy did a survival in Ardennes.
Week 6	Guest(s)	On Day 42, the housemates had visitors who worked at a tuning saloon. They judged the car the housemates tuned.
Week 6	Nominations	On Day 43, Peggy and Kristof received the most nominations and were up for eviction.
Week 7
Week 7	Tasks	On Day 44, Kristof got to Brussels. He had to find hidden clues and was guided by Mathousca. By finding the clues, they could open a safe. The group succeeded, Peggy could open the safe and she was allowed a visit of her boyfriend in the house for 12 hours.; On Day 46, the housemates had to stay safe for a virus, only seen in blacklight, for a task.; On Day 47, the housemates had to empty the swimming pool and refill it with balloons. They failed.
Week 7	Highlights	On Day 45, Peggy receives her boyfriend for 8 hours, she gives 4h to fellow housemate Mathousca who can also receive her boyfriend in the house.
Week 7	Exits	On Day 50, Peggy was evicted from the house.
Week 8
Week 8	Tasks	On Day 50, the housemates got outside for the task. The housemates were told Douglas was kidnapped and they had to find him, but Douglas had to find them and "kill" them. Douglas succeeded so the task succeeded.; On Day 51, the housemates had to build their own small riding vehicle. On Day 53, they hold a race. John was the winner.; On Day 54, the housemates had to sit at poles. The only succeeding housemates were John and Kristof.
Week 8	Guest(s)	On Day 56, bicyclists Tom Steels and Ludo Dierckxens visit the house and hold a bike contest.
Week 8	Nominations	On Day 57, Douglas and Kristof received the most nominations and were up for eviction.
Week 9
Week 9	Tasks	On Day 57, the housemates had to do the seven good deeds. Mathousca helped in a recycling shop, Vanessa visited the sick people, Kristof shared drinks,...; On Day 58, the new task was Asian. Mathousca was the best writing on rice and Douglas the best in martial arts.; On Day 60, the housemates had to learn to be a DJ.
Week 9	Guest(s)	On Day 63, the group Lasgo visited the house and judged their DJ skills. They named Vanessa the best DJ.
Week 9	Exits	On Day 64, Douglas was evicted from the house.
Week 10
Week 10	Tasks	On Day 65, the housemates had to perform famous sayings.; On Day 66, the task was about testing the stereotypes about the different sexes.; On Day 68, the housemates had to do tasks involving trusting each other.
Week 10	Nominations	On Day 71, the housemates discussed the nominations and all four housemates (John, Kristof, Mathousca and Vanessa) were up for eviction.
Week 11
Week 11	Tasks	On Day 72, the housemates had to do a fairytale task. John and Kristof went outdoors and had to do tasks as Little Red Riding Hood, following the guidelines of Mathousca and Vanessa. Vanessa and Kristof failed. John and Mathousca succeeded. John visited and met Mathousca's family.; On Day 73, a task for charity was started. The task lasted two weeks and the profits would go to an asylum for dogs. The following days the housemates did tasks to find sponsors.
Week 11	Guest(s)	On Day 77, the garden was transformed into a winter landscape. Figure skaters learned the housemates of some techniques.
Week 11	Exits	On Day 78, Mathousca was evicted from the house.
Week 12
Week 12	Tasks	On Day 79, the finalists do a task where they acted as spies. They failed.; On Day 80, the tasks for charity continued. Companies could rent one of the finalists to help them in their company.; On Day 81, the housemates held a hockey contest at the ice garden.; On Day 82, the housemates had to build an ice sculpture. Vanessa had the most beautiful one.; On Day 83, the finalists had a race with cars that were built thanks to their fans. John won.
Week 12	Guest(s)	On Day 84, the housemates are joined by artists and singers Milk Inc. and Big Brother VIPs 1 winner Sam Gooris and Tina McBride for the last party.
Week 12	Exits	On Day 85, Vanessa left the house in third place, John left the house as the runner-up, and Kristof was revealed as the winner of the season.

== Nominations table ==
	Week 1	Week 2	Week 3	Week 4	Week 5	Week 7	Week 9	Week 11	Week 12 Final	
Kristof	Nominated	In Hidden; House				Mathousca, Peggy	Douglas, Mathousca	John, Vanessa	Winner (Day 85)	
John	Nominated	In Hidden; House				Mathousca, Peggy	Douglas, Kristof	Kristof, Mathousca	Runner-up (Day 85)	
Vanessa	Douglas	Mathousca	Peggy	Nominated	In Hidden; House	John, Kristof	Douglas, Kristof	Kristof, Mathousca	Third place (Day 85)	
Mathousca	John	Nominated	In Hidden; House			Kristof, Vanessa	Douglas, Kristof	John, Vanessa	Evicted (Day 78)	
Douglas	Nominated	Nominated	Nominated	Nominated	Nominated	Kristof, Peggy	Kristof, Vanessa	Evicted (Day 64)		
Peggy	Kristof	Douglas	Nominated	In Hidden; House		John, Kristof	Evicted (Day 50)			
Kevin	John	Mathousca	Peggy	Vanessa	Nominated	Evicted (Day 36)				
Hannes	Kristof	Mathousca	Peggy	Vanessa	Walked (Day 34)					
Gioia	Kristof	Douglas	Douglas	Walked (Day 23)						
Katja	Kristof	Mathousca	Douglas	Walked (Day 23)						
Tom	John	Walked (Day 15)								
Sadia	Refused	Walked (Day 9)								
Notes	1	none			2	none				
Nominated for eviction	Douglas, John, Kristof	Douglas, Mathousca	Douglas, Peggy	Douglas, Vanessa	Douglas, Kevin	Kristof, Peggy	Douglas, Kristof	John, Kristof, Mathousca, Vanessa	John, Kristof, Vanessa	
Walked	none	Sadia; Tom	none	Katja; Gioia	Hannes	none				
Evicted	Kristof; 4 of 8 votes to move	Mathousca; 4 of 6 votes to move	Peggy; 3 of 5 votes to move	Vanessa; 2 of 2 votes to move	Douglas; Most votes to save	Peggy; Most votes to evict	Douglas; Most votes to evict	Mathousca; Most votes to evict	Vanessa; Fewest votes (out of 3)	John; Fewest votes (out of 2)
Evicted	John; 3 of 8 votes to move	Mathousca; 4 of 6 votes to move	Peggy; 3 of 5 votes to move	Vanessa; 2 of 2 votes to move	Kevin; Fewest votes to save	Peggy; Most votes to evict	Douglas; Most votes to evict	Mathousca; Most votes to evict	Kristof; Most votes to win	

=== Notes ===
- ^Note 1 : The public vote for their favourite housemates and the housemates vote to evict the housemate(s) of their choice. The housemates who receive the most votes moved into the secret house, without the knowledge of their fellow housemates.
- ^Note 2 : Douglas and Kevin, as the only housemates left in the main house, were both nominated for eviction. Douglas was chosen to enter the hidden house and Kevin, as the only housemate left in the main house was the first to be evicted. All the housemates then moved from the hidden house to the main house.
