= Big Brother (Belgian TV series) =

- Original logo of Big Brother
- Genre: Reality competition
- Based on: Big Brother by John de Mol Jr.
- Presented by: Peter Van de Veire (2021); Walter Grootaers (2000–03; 2006–07)
- Country of origin: Belgium (Flemish Region)
- Original language: Flemish Dutch
- No. of series: 9

Production
- Production company: Endemol

Original release
- Network: VIER (2021); Kanaal Twee (2000–03; 2006–07); vtm (2001)
- Release: 3 September 2000 – present

Related
- Big Brother

Big Brother is the Belgian version of the international reality television franchise Big Brother produced by Endemol. The show aired in Flemish Region of Belgium on Kanaal Twee and has had a total of nine seasons. There have been six regular seasons, two celebrity seasons and one all-stars season. The first season of the show aired in 2000.

A cooperation series between Belgium and The Netherlands premiered on 4 January 2021 and was aired on VIER in Belgium and RTL 5 in the Netherlands.

== Format ==
The format of Big Brother has the same format as the international Big Brother franchise. A group of strangers lives together in an isolated home. They have to work together to succeed in tasks but next to that they also have to nominate each other. The nominated housemates are up for eviction by the audience. Ultimately, the last housemate who leaves the house is the winner. The program was introduced in Flanders as the ultimate social experiment.

=== The house ===
The Big Brother House was built next to the buildings of broadcaster VTM at Medialaan 3 in Vilvoorde. It was built in less than four months, with a one-month construction vacation. Because the housemates would live in the house, there had to be much administration done and there wasn't enough time. It is said the mayor of Vilvoorde, Jean-Luc Dehaene made it possible the administration was completed in time. The same building plans of the Dutch Big Brother house were used. The house was 212 m^{2} and the garden was 240 m^{2}. Central in the house were two hidden walkways which formed across where the crew could film the housemates everywhere. There were 26 cameras and 60 microphones everywhere even in the toilet. Although the camera in the toilet was discussed a lot in media, it was never used in the show.

For the second season, a net covered the garden to obstruct messages from the outside thrown into the garden. An isolation room was added to the house. It was 4 m^{2} and had a chemical toilet. In the third season, the garden was completely covered with a glass ceiling. It was demolished in 2005.

The second house was built for the fifth season at the same location as the first one, in less than six months. The house was created as one open space surrounded by walkways for the crew and cameras. There were 60 microphones and 34 cameras. In the open space, everything was made out of glass – even the wall and the three showers. The glasshouse meant no privacy for the housemates. There was also a loft which had more luxury. The housemates had no space in the open air but a covered courtyard. The house was built so it could be easily reshaped as a television studio. This happened in July 2007 when Big Brother was scrapped and broadcaster JIMtv moved in.

For the 2021 season, for the first time, the cooperation for Big Brother between Flanders and the Netherlands, a new house was built in Amsterdam, next to the Johan Cruyff Arena at a parking lot of Endemol Shine in only a few months. The house was 300 m^{2}. There were 125 cameras, 100 indoor cameras and 25 outdoor cameras, and 39 speakers.

=== Changes of the concept ===
Since the start of its first season in September 2000, Big Brother Belgium went through numerous changes in its concept. Here are some significant examples of the progress of modifying the rules of the original game:

- "Only the housemates have to decide which of them gets nominated.": changed in season 3 were halfway to the season the viewers nominated and the housemates vote to evict and in season 4 were the viewers voted for their favorite housemates (unknown to the housemates) and the housemates vote to evict one of those housemates (to a secret location).
- "None of the housemates know each other before entering the house.": changed in season 5 with a couple in a romantic relationship entering the house and in season 6 there was a couple of friends, two sisters, a team of exes, two nieces, a romantic couple, a father and adoptive son who entered as pairs.
- "The prize money is a certainty": changed in season 6 where the prize money was reduced for every lie that was told (and detected by the lie detector).
- "The complete household lives together in one group": changed in season 4 with the most popular housemates at a secret location and the remaining housemates at the Big Brother house. In season 5 the season started with some housemates living in the secret loft.
- "Only the winner receives prize money": changed in season 3 where every housemate had his own budget. When the housemate evicted they received the remaining budget.
- "The housemates get no information from outside": changed in season 2 where the housemates were informed about the 911 terrorist attack.
- "The housemates live isolated in a house": changed in season 3 when housemates received tasks to do outside the house.

== History ==
Despite the start of the first season of Big Brother in the neighboring Netherlands, it seemed Flanders was not interested in the program. Neither VTM or VT4 wanted the program. Creator John de Mol Jr. stated there was political pressure in Flanders that blocked the program. There was much controversy in Flanders about the concept and many experts – psychologists, sociologists and even politicians – shared their view. However, things changed when Big Brother in the Netherlands was successful, Germany had bought its own version and other countries showed interest in their own local version. VTM and VT4 both showed interest. It was VTM who bought the format, thanks to director Eric Claeys. Since the program was so controversial and VTM was directed to families, it was decided Big Brother would be broadcast at Kanaal 2, a smaller broadcaster. In May 2000 the show had the last go to be launched in September. There were only 4 months to get everything ready. A crew of 106 people was selected.

=== The beginning ===
On 3 June 2000, A special show Big Brother – De Start (Big Brother - the Start) was launched after a match with the Red Devils. The special was 30 minutes and had professors like philosopher Etienne Vermeersch and scientists like astronaut Dirk Frimout discussing social isolation. There were also testimonials of top athletes and ex-prisoners. The special was a call for participants. In two days there were 7500 letters from people who wanted to participate.

Participants were screened thoroughly. They had long questionnaires, conversations with the producers, psychological tests and conversations with a psychologist. Editor-in-chief Bart Verbeelen later stated that even some participants were followed by a private detective. Since the show already made some controversy before it was even aired, the producers wanted to make sure the housemates would be mentally healthy.

On 3 September 2000, the kick-off of the first season aired and it was very successful. The daily episodes had more than 800,000 viewers on average. Every live show reached more than 1 million viewers. Big Brother was in the top 10 ratings weekly. After a call from housemate Steven Spillebeen for wax, more than 140 wax pots were thrown in the garden. Since the concept of this reality show was new, there was much attention for Betty Owczarek who was often shown naked and for Bart Van Opstal & Katrijn Verlinden who were the first couple to have sex on Flanders television. Housemate Jeroen Denaeghel and other housemates experienced Stockholm syndrome where they developed sympathy for Big Brother and its house and were scared to leave the house. Housemates were instant celebrities. It was the most visited website in Belgium in 2000. More than 5000 people were in the audience when Steven Spillebeen was declared the winner of the first season. The highlight of the finale reached 1,895,000 viewers. Because of the success of the program, Spillebeen had to stay the first 2 weeks undercover. Big Brother was very successful for the first season in Belgium. Not only the program had high ratings but also the official website was visited a lot. Because of the high demand for the 12 free cameras for live streaming, the site crashed a few times. In total, the camera's were more than 9 million times used for free viewing. 70.000 people visited the website daily and 4.2 million people weekly. The website had 75 million hits during the whole season. It was the most visited website in Belgium in 2000.

=== Continuation ===
The first season was the launch of huge success for the Big Brother franchise in Flanders. But every season had less impact. Producers stated that only the first season was real reality television. It was completely new for the makers of the program, the audience and the housemates. Housemates in later seasons knew what to expect and often hoped for an entertainment career rather than having a good or interesting time in the house. Editor-in-chief Bart Verbeelen also believed the producers started to experiment too quickly from the original concept and focusing more on conflicts.

Beforehand the second season were two spin-offs. The reality documentary Het leven na Big Brother (Life after Big Brother) documented the celebrity life of the housemates of the first season and a celebrity version Big Brother VIPs 1. Although Big Brother was broadcast at Kanaal 2, both spin-offs were broadcast at the bigger channel VTM. Both spin-offs were in the top 20 ratings of 2001, Big Brother VIPs 1 ranking at 9th place and with 1,161,300 viewers and Het leven na Big Brother ranking at 16th place.

13,000 people wanted to be a housemate for Big Brother 2. The second season was launched in September 2001. It started with a twist, 11 male housemates and only 1 female housemate entered the house on the opening night. In every province of Flanders, there was a Big Brother pub. And viewers could watch the housemates all the time on a pay-TV channel. The second season was still successful in the ratings, especially the live shows. The show received more criticism. Following a party where housemates lost control after drinking alcohol, many viewers complained about the images of the kissing and suggested sex between three couples. The producers also censored the view of naked housemate Detlev and fellow housemate Irena who entered a large water tank. Commentators believed that night determined the whole season. It's the one thing viewers remember about the second season and the one housemate who acted properly was voted the winner at the end of the series. The finale was the 8th highest-rated show in 2001. The live shows of the second season still had more than 1 million viewers. Pay television CanalDigitaal which offered a 24/24 live stream had 20% more subscribers during the season.

Following the criticism of season 2, the producers changed a lot for the third season in 2002 and even added new twists, like a mole. Housemates were selected out of 4,500 candidates. Although the producers called the season its best season to date because of its colorful housemates, the audience thought it was the most boring season. The ratings started to slip.

In 2003, Big Brother All Stars launched beforehand the fourth season. The fourth season was built around a huge twist. The original plan was the housemates were "evicted" to a secret place by housemates, and the most unpopular housemates would be mass evicted halfway the season. But because without being evicted and unfriendly housemates, the Big Brother house became a hostile place. Five housemates left the house voluntarily after many conflicts and bullying. The twist had no effection because there was eventually only one unpopular housemate left. There was also criticism about animal abuse when housemates Kristof, Mathousca and John had to kill a chicken. The producers apologized and made some tasks about charity and animal welfare by the end of this season. The season was the least popular and the rating continued to drop. Daily episodes received 300,000 viewers. Caused by ongoing criticism and a change of program directors at VTM, Big Brother was axed for an undetermined time in 2004. The house was demolished.

=== First revival ===
Big Brother returned with the fifth season in 2006. A new house was built and the concept was rethought. The season was well received. A Big Brother VIPs 2 followed. In the sixth season "Zero Privacy" in 2007, the show was introduced a lie detector. During the kick-off show, housemates entered the house in pairs. Viewers complained about the boring housemates. Producers tried to spark interest by changing half of the housemates into new ones and adding two actors in the house. Ratings dropped very fast. The broadcast schedule of the live shows was also changed to reach more viewers. At the final on 4 June 2007, there was no call for future housemates. A few weeks later, the producers stated that Big Brother wouldn't be coming back for an indefinite time.

=== Second revival ===
In July 2020, it was revealed by RTL 5 and VIER that a new season in cooperation by the Netherlands and Flanders-Belgium would air in 2021. Four seasons followed in the following years. After five seasons, this revival ended in 2025.

=== Back to the originals ===
In December 2025, exactly 25 years after the finale of the very first Belgian Big Brother and following the cancellation of the Belgian-Dutch co-production of Big Brother between Play and RTL, television channel VTM devoted a lot of attention to the very first and original Big Brother season. The three finalists were the first guests on the new vodcast Flashback. In addition, the kick-off episode, all compilation episodes and the finale were uploaded to VTM Go under the name ‘Big Brother Originals’.

== Series details ==
Big Brother (Belgian edition)

Season	Theme	Originally aired			Days	Housemates	Winner	The prize	Presenter	Co-presenter
Season	Theme	First aired	Last aired	Network	Days	Housemates	Winner	The prize	Presenter	Co-presenter
Big Brother 1	Back to Basics	3 September 2000	17 December 2000	Kanaal Twee	105	13	Steven Spillebeen	5,000,000 fr.	Walter Grootaers	Sandy Blanckaert
Big Brother 2	Evil Big Brother	2 September 2001	16 December 2001	Kanaal Twee	105	20	Ellen Dufour	5,000,000 fr.	Walter Grootaers	Gerrit De Cock
Big Brother 3	Luxury	1 September 2002	15 December 2002	Kanaal Twee	105	14	Kelly Vandevenne	€33,099	Walter Grootaers	Gerrit De Cock
Big Brother 4	The Twist	21 September 2003	14 December 2003	Kanaal Twee	85	12	Kristof Van Camp	€60,533	Walter Grootaers	Gerrit De Cock
Big Brother 5	House of Secrets	26 February 2006	29 May 2006	Kanaal Twee	92	15	Kirsten Janssens	€100,000	Walter Grootaers	Sandrine Van Handenhove
Big Brother 6	Zero Privacy	7 March 2007	4 June 2007	Kanaal Twee	92	20	Diana Ferrante	€81,000	Walter Grootaers	Kelly Pfaff

Big Brother (Belgian and Dutch edition)

Season	Theme	Originally aired			Days	Housemates	Winner	The prize	Presenter (Belgium)	Presenter (Netherlands)
Season	Theme	First aired	Last aired	Network	Days	Housemates	Winner	The prize	Presenter (Belgium)	Presenter (Netherlands)
Big Brother 2021	experiment	4 January 2021	8 April 2021	VIER/Play4	99	19	Jill Goede	€70,405.50	Peter Van de Veire	Geraldine Kemper
Big Brother 2022	storm	3 January 2022	26 March 2022	VIER/Play4	86	16	Salar Abassi Abraasi	€69,815	Peter Van de Veire	Geraldine Kemper
Big Brother 2023	individual	9 January 2023	1 April 2023	VIER/Play4	86	16	Bart Vandenbroek	€73,338	Tatyana Beloy	Geraldine Kemper
Big Brother 2024	duo	15 January 2024	13 April 2024	VIER/Play4	93	18	Glenn Van Himst	€56,266	Tatyana Beloy	Geraldine Kemper
Big Brother 2025	battle	6 January 2025	4 April 2025	VIER/Play4	92	18	Jordy de Maar	€55,500	Tatyana Beloy	Geraldine Kemper

Big Brother VIPs

Season	Film dates		Originally aired		Days	Housemates	Winner	Presenter
Season	Film started	Film ended	First aired	Last aired	Days	Housemates	Winner	Presenter
Big Brother VIPs 1	20 March 2001	30 March 2001	4 April 2001	4 June 2001	11	12	Sam Gooris	No presenter
Big Brother VIPs 2	August 2006	September 2006	12 October 2006	28 December 2006	10	12	Pim Symoens	No presenter

Big Brother All Stars

Season	Originally aired		Days	Housemates	Winner	Presenter	Co-presenter
Season	First aired	Last aired	Days	Housemates	Winner	Presenter	Co-presenter
Big Brother All Stars	31 August 2003	20 September 2003	21	12	Heidi Zutterman	Walter Grootaers	Gerrit De Cock

== Broadcasting ==
Big Brother was broadcast by KanaalTwee from season 1 to season 6. For the 2021 season, the show was broadcast on Vier (later rebranded as Play4).

Season	Broadcaster	Monday	Tuesday	Wednesday	Thursday	Friday	Saturday	Sunday
1	Kanaal 2	Highlights shows (8:25 pm)					Highlights compilation (8:00 pm)	Live show (09:00 pm)
2	Kanaal 2	Highlights shows (8:25 pm)					Highlights compilation (8:00 pm)	Live show (09:10 pm)
3	KanaalTwee	Live stream (2:00 am – 7:00 am); Live stream (10:00 am – 12:00 pm); Live stream (14:00 pm – 16:00pm); Highlights shows (8:30 pm)					Live stream (2:00 am – 7:00 am); Live stream (10:00 am – 12:00 pm); Live stream (14:00 pm – 16:00pm); Live stream (8:00 pm)	Live stream (2:00 am – 7:00 am); Live stream (10:00 am – 12:00 pm); Live stream (14:00 pm – 16:00pm); Live show (09:30 pm)
4	KanaalTwee	Live stream (2:00 am – 7:00 am); Live stream (10:00 am – 12:00 pm); Live stream (14:00 pm – 16:00pm); Highlights shows (8:30 pm)					Live stream (2:00 am – 7:00 am); Live stream (10:00 am – 12:00 pm); Live stream (14:00 pm – 16:00pm); Live stream (8:00 pm)	Live stream (2:00 am – 7:00 am); Live stream (10:00 am – 12:00 pm); Live stream (14:00 pm – 16:00pm); Live show (09:30 pm)
5	KanaalTwee	Live show (09:10 pm)	Highlights shows (8:30 pm)					
6 (Note: The broadcast schedule was changed halfway through the season 6.)	KanaalTwee	Highlights shows (8:35 pm)			Live show (08:35 pm)	Highlights shows (8:35 pm)		
6	KanaalTwee	Live show (08:35 pm)	Highlights shows (8:35 pm)					
7	VIER/Play4	Highlights shows (9:30 pm)				Live show (9:30 pm)	Weekly overview (9:50 pm)	—N/a

== Live stream ==
There were a 24 hours live stream for most of the series. During the second season, the live stream on broadcaster Canaldigitaal. During the third and fourth seasons the live stream were on KanaalTwee. In the fifth season, it was on Belgacom TV. And for the 2021 season, the live stream was on Telenet and Vier.be (later changed to Play4.be).

== Intros ==
Season	Song (English Translation)	Performer
1	Leef (Live)	Mozaïek feat Walter Grootaers
2	Gedachten zijn vrij (My thoughts are free)	Peter Vanlaet and Walter Grootaers
3	Ontdek jezelf (Discover yourself)	Sergio and Walter Grootaers
4	I wanna be	Brahim
5	Freefall	Wouter
6	Larger than life	Regi & Wout feat Kelly Pfaff
7	Big Brother	Davina Michelle feat Woodie Smalls

== Controversy ==
There was much controversy about how real Big Brother was during the first season. Nathalie Chabas was the first housemate who complained about the image shown of her on the show wasn't who she really was. Producers reacted that participants can be surprised when they are confronted with images of their own behavior. Betty Owczarek often said in interviews that she was presented one-dimensional. Owczarek stated that all women were sometimes naked in the Big Brother house, but only she was shown.

Other housemates in the next seasons had the same complaints. Dominique Cardon from the second season believed the fact she did almost all the housekeeping and Kurt Willem being the house psychologist for the other housemates was never shown on purpose by the producers. Esther Blockx from the third season stated that she noticed the cameras never followed her during daily tasks. However, she heard the cameras move and zoom when she cuddled with male housemates. Many housemates believed the producers created a character for everybody and only used the matching recorded images.

Housemates from the second season believed the controversial party was encouraged by Big Brother on purpose by starving the housemates for weeks and treat them afterward with lots of alcohol. Producers admitted they did let some items lying around, making it easier or more difficult for some tasks to succeed.

Housemate Jeroen Denaeghel wrote the book Cel of Hotel: in de klauwen van Big Brother (Cel or Hotel: in Big Brother's claws) about his experiences during and after the program, based on the diary he wrote during his stay in the Big Brother. Production company Endemol was not amused and started a legal battle. Eventually a censored edition of the book was available by the end of 2001. Housemate Ester Blockx did a guest lecture at the University of KU Leuven about her experiences.

The casting of the housemates of Big Brother was also criticized. The first season had 13 housemates with no housemate having an immigrant background. The second season had its first housemate with multicultural background, Bachir Boumaâza. There was much racism towards Boumaâza on the Internet and there were mass votes to evict him. The producers of Big Brother reacted. After his eviction Boumaâza appeared at the program Recht van Antwoord (The Right to Defend) to talk about racism and the example he tried to set in Big Brother. In future seasons, the casting was more diverse including a housemate with dwarfism, a transgender housemate, a pregnant housemate and a housemate with HIV. Critics called it an attempt to get more viewers. Other opinions were that Big Brother made taboo's discussable. Housemate Glenn Verhoeven was one of the first openly homosexuals on television in Flanders without homosexuality being stereotyped. Kenny Van Quickelberghe of season 5 was glad he could show during the program that people with HIV can have a normal life. Professor Gust De Meyer wrote a book about it and saw the program as an interesting mirror of modern society.

== Impact ==
The housemates of the first season received much attention. They were asked for many acts of attendance and were shown in other programs. The effects of this newfound fame were shown in the spin-off program Het leven na Big Brother – Life after Big Brother. During the following seasons, the interest of the corresponding housemates decreased.

Many housemates received offers for posing naked. Betty Owczarek got a deal with Playboy. The edition of Owczarek was sold out everywhere in Flanders. There were talks for a second photo shoot but there wasn't an agreement made. Irena Milano was also photographed in Playboy and was even playmate that month. Also, other housemates such as Catherine Buseyne, Isabelle Bleuzé, Dominique Cardon, Esther Blockx and Jolie M'Polita went naked on the magazine cover. The only male housemate going naked was Detlev Van den Eynde in a special Black Box of Dennis Black Magic. Liesel Pauwels went into porn with the Big Brother parody "Big House".

Nathalie Chabas, Glenn Verhoeven, Katrijn Verlinden, Bart Van Opstal and Jeroen Denaeghel as Los Papagueros from the first season and Kurt Willem from the second season released singles with divided success. It was especially Betty Owczarek from Big Brother 1 and Big Brother 2 winner Ellen Dufour who were able to start a music career. Hanz Brandt of Season 3 was more successful as a DJ following his participation.

Steven Spillebeen and Jeroen Denaeghel presented the program Studio Spillonimo at JIM TV. At the same broadcaster, Frank Molnar presented a game show for years. Ellen Dufour was the presenter of "Kids Top 20" at VTM. Kurt Willem was one of the presenters at the launch of digital broadcaster Ment TV. Kirsten Janssens was shown for some seasons in the reality show The Sky is the Limit.

Hannes D'Haese's artwork received more attention and Benjamin Bundervoet was shown more in media as the mascot of KAA Gent.

Despite most housemates aren't active in media anymore, they are still recognized and addressed after 20 years. According to Katrijn Verlinden and Kristof Van Camp, this is daily.

Big Brother was the first reality-soap in Flanders. Years after the first season it was called the mother of reality television. It would lead into new programs using real people and not only actors. Professor Gust Demeyer called Big Brother a work of art, stating it made the private life for the first time public. He wrote a book about it and saw the program as an interesting mirror of modern society. In 2011 the show was named one of the most 10 influential television programs ever on Flanders television by a special selected panel of media experts.
