= Big Brother (Belgian TV series) season 2 =

Big Brother
- Season 2
- Presented by: Walter Grootaers; Gerrit De Cock
- No. of days: 105
- No. of housemates: 20
- Winner: Ellen Dufour
- Runner-up: Thierry Andries

Release
- Original network: Kanaal 2
- Original release: 2 September – 16 December 2001

Season chronology
- ← Previous; Season 1 Next → Season 3

Big Brother 2 is the second season of the Belgian version of Big Brother aired in the Flemish Region of Belgium on Kanaal 2. The show started on 2 September 2001 and finished on 16 December 2001 with a total duration of 106 days.

Changes for this season making it harder to live for housemates: add an isolation cell, lower the budget of the group and add the opening twist (eleven male housemates and only one female housemate on opening night, but changed at the end of the week by having six male and five female housemates). Those measures impacted the group dynamic in many ways. An exception was made about the news of the outside world, when producers decided to inform the housemates about 9/11 since a family member of one of the housemates was involved.

The season was known for many conflicts and some parties that got out of hand, which led to much criticism. One of the positive highlights was the task for charity. The housemates collected more than 7 million Belgium francs (BEF) in one week.

Ellen Dufour was the winner and won 5 million BEF. The ratings of the highlights shows and the highlights compilation shows dropped. But still, Big Brother was successful, having the live shows often with more than 1 million viewers. The finale was the eighth highest-rated show in 2001 in Flanders and was watched by 1.1 million viewers. Pay television CanalDigitaal which offered a 24 hours live stream had more subscribers because of Big Brother.

== Format ==
This season had the same Back to Basics format as the first season. The tag line of the season was "Bigger, harder and better". The season was indeed harder to live since there were some changes that made staying in the house a lot more difficult for the housemates:

- The daily budget was only 100BEF (decreased from 150BEF).
- The group could only receive 50 or 100% wage for the weekly task (in comparison with 25, 50, 75 and 100% in the first season).
- The luxury products like alcohol, cigarettes and shampoo increased by 75%.
- An isolation cell was built for housemates who not following the rules. The cell was only 4m².

Another difference was the nomination system

- Three housemates (instead of two in the first season) with the most nominations were nominated.
- A "floche" was added. After the announcement of the nominated housemates, one of them could pull down the "floche". This housemate would have been saved from eviction but the group would lose its weekly budget.
- The public could vote during the live show to rescue one of the nominated housemates.
- The remaining nominated housemates faced the public vote for eviction.

== Housemates ==
Name	Age on entry	Hometown	Occupation	Day entered	Day exited	Result
Ellen Dufour	20	Zutendaal	student store manager	6	106	Winner
Thierry Andries	34	Bruges	baker	1	106	Runner-up
Peter Persoons	33	Tessenderlo	sports monitor	1	106	3rd Place
Aurore Vangu	22	Evere	student physical education	36	106	4th Place
Kurt Willem	30	Ostend	club animator	1	99	Evicted
Dominique Cardon	27	Bruges	manager roadhouse	7	92	Evicted
Sabine Therssen	23	Tervuren	hairdresser and administrative clerk	5	78	Evicted
Lincy Vynckier	27	Waregem	cook	36	71	Walked
Mustafa El Oiamari	29	Merksem	support-computer engineer	36	64	Evicted
Detlev Van den Eynde	25	Westmalle	land surveyor modellist	1	50	Evicted
Irena Milano	21	Opglabbeek	sales window dresser	3	36	Evicted
Dirk Rasking	33	Sint-Truiden	sauna receptionist	1	34	Walked
Patricia Cornelissen	28	Tielt-Winge	postman	1	22	Evicted
Liesel Pauwels	18	Berlaar	social worker	4	13	Escaped
Eric Van Damme	42	Boom	pharmaceutical distributor	1	13	Escaped
Miguel De Wilde	27	Rumst	manager supermarket	1	7	Evicted
Tom Switten	23	Diepenbeek	coach young people	1	6	Evicted
Geert Quisenaerts	33	Antwerp	office holder race	1	5	Evicted
Bachir Boumaâza	21	Antwerp	student informatics	1	4	Evicted
Kurt Samyn	28	Langemark	fish seller	1	3	Evicted

== Weekly summary ==
Week 1
Week 1	Entrances	On Day 1, 11 male housemates, Bachir, Detlev, Dirk, Eric, Geert, Kurt, Miguel, Peter, Thierry, Tom and Tuur, one female housemate Patricia entered the house.; On Day 3 Irena entered the house.; On Day 4 Liesel entered the house.; On Day 5 Sabine entered the house.; On Day 6 Ellen entered the house.; On Day 7 Dominique entered the house.; On Day 8 Dirk re-entered the house.
Week 1	Twists	On Day 1, 11 male housemates and 1 housemate entered the house. At the end of the week, Big Brother wanted to have the same amount of male and female housemates. The only female housemate, Patricia, had to choose three male housemates to up for eviction. Once the public had evicted one of the male housemates, the next female housemate would enter the house. She had the same task as the first female housemate.; On Day 8, the audience could vote for one of the evicted male housemates (Kurt S, Bachir, Geert, Tom, Miguel and Dirk) back into the house. Dirk, who had just left the house, was voted back in.
Week 1	Tasks	On Day 2, housemates were given their first weekly task, which required them to pump up 2,500 soccer balls. They also had to gather when the national anthem was played. Each completed fall had to put on a tower and wasn't allowed to fall. The housemates wagered 100% on this task. The group failed the task.
Week 1	Nominations	On Day 2, Bachir, Eric Kurt S were nominated by Patricia.; On Day 3, Bachir, Eric and Geert were nominated by Irena.; On Day 4, Geert, Peter and Tom were nominated by Liesel.; On Day 5, Detlev, Eric and Tom were nominated by Sabine.; On Day 6, Eric, Miguel and Thierry were nominated by Ellen.; On Day 7, Detlev, Dirk and Peter were nominated by Dominique.
Week 1	Exits	On Day 3, Kurt S was evicted from the house.; On Day 4, Bachir was evicted from the house.; On Day 5, Geert was evicted from the house.; On Day 6, Tom was evicted from the house.; On Day 7, Miguel was evicted from the house.; On Day 8, Dirk was evicted from the house. But he was re-voted in by the audience.
Week 2
Week 2	Tasks	On Day 9, the housemates were given their second weekly task, which required them to photoshoots with themes (historical or biblical, vacation shots, movie scenes, artistic nudes and sports photos). They had to send these photos by post and on Friday with pigeons. The task was succeeded if one photo of each theme would get the cover of a Flemish journal. The housemates wagered 50% on this task. The task was modified because of 9/11. The photos weren't needed to be on the cover anymore but anywhere in the journal or newspaper. The group failed the task. Many photos were publicized but only of the themed artistic nudes.
Week 2	Punishments	On Day 10, the housemates were punished for the whispering of Dirk and Patricia. They have to give 11 negatives of the photos to Big Brother.; On Day 12, after multiple warnings about gossiping and whispering, Big Brother punished Patricia by placing duct tape on her mouth.
Week 2	Exits	On Day 13, Eric and Liesel escaped the house by climbing over the roof.
Week 2	Nominations	On Day 15, Dominique, Ellen, Irena and Patricia received the most nominations. Ellen was saved by the audience. Dominique, Irena and Patricia faced the public vote.
Week 3
Week 3	Tasks	On Day 16, the housemates were given their third weekly task, in which they would have been chained up at a rope throughout the house. The housemates wagered 50% on this task. The group failed the task by refusing doing it.
Week 3	Highlights	On Day 17, because a member of Irena's family was involved, the housemates were informed about the attacks at September 11 by the spokesman of VTM Mark Vanlombeek and a psychologist.
Week 3	Exits	On Day 22, Patricia was evicted from the house.
Week 4
Week 4	Tasks	On Day 23, the housemates were given their fourth weekly task, which required one housemate at each time to sit in a water tank. Other housemates could give the housemate in the tank air by pumping air into the helmet. They wagered 100% of their budget on the task, which they passed.
Week 4	Nominations	On Day 29, Detlev, Dominique, Irena and Sabine received the most nominations. Sabine was saved by the audience. Detlev, Dominique and Irena faced the public vote.
Week 5
Week 5	Highlights	On Day 29, the housemates became very drunk at a party and the first alcohol in weeks. Detlev & Irena, Dirk & Dominique and Peter & Sabine became intimate.
Week 5	Tasks	On Day 30, the task was to build a hot air balloon with two stitching machines. By individual tasks, the housemates could earn air. The task was succeeded if the balloon with one housemate in the casket would stay five minutes into the air during the Live show. They wagered 100% of their budget on the task, which they passed.
Week 5	Exits	On Day 34, Dirk voluntarily left the house.; On Day 36, Irena was evicted from the house.
Week 5	Entrances	On Day 36, Aurore, Lincy and Musti entered the house.
Week 6
Week 6	Tasks	On Day 37, housemates were given a building task, in which, they had to make a big sandcastle with specific requirements. The group wagered 50% on the task, which they passed.
Week 6	Nominations	On Day 43, Detlev, Musti and Thierry received the most nominations. Musti was saved by the audience. Detlev and Thierry faced the public vote.
Week 7
Week 7	Tasks	On Day 44, housemates were given their weekly task, a return to prehistoric times. The group was divided into two teams. Team A was Detlev, Lincy and Thierry. Team B was Aurore, Peter and Sabine. The teams had to compete with each other. The team that won, could exchange one of its members for one of the other housemates. The housemates wagered 100% of their shopping budget. The group passed the task.
Week 7	Exits	On Day 50, Detlev was evicted from the house.
Week 8
Week 8	Tasks	On Day 51, the housemates were given their weekly task, which saw them break down in the garden and rebuilding and repainting a Citroën 2CV into the house. During the live show, the car had to be able to drive from the kitchen to the living area, use the turn signals and sound the horn. The housemates wagered 100% of their budget on the task, which they passed.
Week 8	Highlights	On Day 52, tired of the drinking of his fellow housemates, Musti emptied all the remaining beer bottles in secret in the garden.
Week 8	Nominations	On Day 57, Aurore, Dominique, Musti and Sabine received the most nominations. Dominique was saved by the audience. Aurore, Musti and Sabine faced the public vote.
Week 9
Week 9	Tasks	On Day 58, for the task the housemates had to build rails throughout the house where they had to travel on in a trolley. The housemates wagered 100% of their budget on the task, which they failed.
Week 9	Exits	On Day 64, Musti was evicted from the house.
Week 9	Entrances	On Day 64, two pets entered the house. The cats were named George and Pluche.
Week 10
Week 10	Tasks	On Day 65, the task involved building a trail with domino bricks. There had to be 28.000 bricks and there had to be three logos into the pattern: of KanaalTwee, Big Brother and the blueprint of the Big Brother house. The housemates wagered 50% of their budget on the task, which they failed.
Week 10	Highlights	On Day 67, plenty of telegrams were delivered at the house and given to the housemates for Ellen and Kurt W's birthdays. The telegrams contain birthday messages to celebrate housemates but also contain negative messages for the other housemates.
Week 10	Exits	On Day 71, Lincy voluntarily left the house.
Week 10	Nominations	On Day 71, Aurore, Dominique and Sabine received the most nominations. Aurore was saved by the audience. Dominique and Sabine faced the public vote.
Week 11
Week 11	Tasks	On Day 72, the housemates had to build 1,500 birdhouses, marked with the Big Brother logo. All the housemates have to sleep during the week in a nest in the living area. Every day a housemates is named the breeding bird by Big Brother. This housemate has to sit on an egg all day. The housemates wagered 100% of their budget on the task, which they passed.
Week 11	Exits	On Day 78, Sabine was evicted from the house.
Week 12
Week 12	Punishments	On Day 79, supporters of Dominique were on the other side of the fence. Thierry put her on his shoulders so she could have a look. Big Brother punished the group by taking 20% of the budget.; On Day 81, Ellen and Thierry are punished because they kept and hid secret messages from supporters, thrown into the garden with tennis balls, and were chained to each other for 24 hours.
Week 12	Tasks	On Day 79, were given the weekly task in which each housemate had to guess a secret song. There was a jukebox with 100 music albums. Individual tasks gave clues about what albums could be eliminated. The housemates wagered 50% of their budget on the task, which they failed since they guessed ABBA while the song was Kids from America from Kim Wilde.
Week 12	Nominations	On Day 85, Aurore, Dominique, Kurt W and Thierry received the most nominations. Thierry was saved by the audience. Aurore, Dominique and Kurt W faced the public vote.
Week 13
Week 13	Tasks	On Day 86, housemates were given the weekly task. They had to collect 5,000,000BEF in a week for the VZW Toekan, an organisation that gave children from unfortunate families toys. The housemates did all they can for Big Brother 2 Kids. The housemates wagered 100% of their budget on the task, which they passed very well.
Week 13	Highlights	On Day 92, the weekly task was a success. The housemates collected 7,354,612 BEF.
Week 13	Exits	On Day 92, Dominque was evicted from the house.
Week 14
Week 14	Tasks	On Day 93, in the weekly task, the housemates have to play casino games. They have to threefold their fiches by the end of the week. The housemates wagered 100% of their budget on the task, which they passed.
Week 14	Nominations	On Day 95, Aurore, Ellen, Kurt W and Thierry received the most nominations. Ellen was saved by the audience. Aurore, Kurt W and Thierry faced the public vote.
Week 14	Exits	On Day 99, Kurt W was evicted from the house.
Week 15
Week 15	Tasks	On Day 100, the housemates received a locked fridge. They could earn keys by doing individual tasks. The housemates succeeded in opening the fridge and find all the drinks, luxury food and ice cream for their final weekend.
Week 15	Exits	On Day 106, Aurore left the house in fourth place, Peter in third place, Thierry left the house as the runner-up, and Ellen was revealed as the winner of the season.

== Nominations table ==
	Week 1						Week 3	Week 5	Week 7	Week 9	Week 11	Week 13	Week 14	Week 15 Final	
	Day 2	Day 3	Day 4	Day 5	Day 6	Day 7	Week 3	Week 5	Week 7	Week 9	Week 11	Week 13	Week 14	Week 15 Final	
Ellen	Not in House				Eric, Miguel, Thierry	Not; Eligible	Irena, Thierry	Irena, Thierry	Aurore, Musti	Musti, Sabine	Dominique, Sabine	Kurt W., Thierry	Kurt W., Theirry	Winner (Day 106)	
Thierry	Not; Eligible	Not; Eligible	Not; Eligible	Not; Eligible	Not; Eligible	Not; Eligible	Ellen, Patricia	Dominique, Sabine	Aurore, Sabine	Dominique, Musti	Aurore, Dominique	Aurore, Dominique	Aurore, Ellen	Runner-up (Day 106)	
Peter	Not; Eligible	Not; Eligible	Not; Eligible	Not; Eligible	Not; Eligible	Not; Eligible	Dominique, Irena	Dominique, Irena	Lincy, Musti	Lincy, Musti	Aurore, Dominique	Aurore, Dominique	Aurore, Ellen	Third place (Day 106)	
Aurore	Not in House								Detlev, Thierry	Dominique, Kurt W.	Dominique, Sabine	Kurt W., Thierry	Kurt W., Theirry	Fourth place (Day 106)	
Kurt W.	Not; Eligible	Not; Eligible	Not; Eligible	Not; Eligible	Not; Eligible	Not; Eligible	Irena, Peter	Detlev, Sabine	Musti, Sabine	Aurore, Musti	Dominique, Sabine	Aurore, Ellen	Aurore, Ellen	Evicted (Day 99)	
Dominique	Not in House					Detlev, Dirk, Peter	Detlev, Peter	Detlev, Thierry	Detlev, Thierry	Aurore, Musti	Aurore, Thierry	Peter, Thierry	Evicted (Day 92)		
Sabine	Not in House			Detlev, Eric, Tom	Not; Eligible	Not; Eligible	Dominique, Ellen	Detlev, Dominique	Lincy, Musti	Aurore, Lincy	Aurore, Ellen	Evicted (Day 78)			
Lincy	Not in House								Detlev, Thierry	Dominique, Sabine	Walked (Day 71)				
Musti	Not in House								Detlev, Thierry	Kurt W., Sabine	Evicted (Day 64)				
Detlev	Not; Eligible	Not; Eligible	Not; Eligible	Not; Eligible	Not; Eligible	Not; Eligible	Dominique, Patricia	Dominique, Sabine	Aurore, Lincy	Evicted (Day 50)					
Irena	Not in House	Bachir, Eric, Geert	Not; Eligible	Not; Eligible	Not; Eligible	Not; Eligible	Ellen, Patricia	Dominique, Dirk	Evicted (Day 36)						
Dirk	Not; Eligible	Not; Eligible	Not; Eligible	Not; Eligible	Not; Eligible	Not; Eligible	Dominique, Irena	Detlev, Irena	Walked (Day 33)						
Patricia	Bachir, Eric, Kurt S.	Not; Eligible	Not; Eligible	Not; Eligible	Not; Eligible	Not; Eligible	Irena, Patricia	Evicted (Day 22)							
Eric	Not; Eligible	Not; Eligible	Not; Eligible	Not; Eligible	Not; Eligible	Not; Eligible	Walked (Day 13)								
Liesel	Not in House		Geert, Peter, Tom	Not; Eligible	Not; Eligible	Not; Eligible	Walked (Day 13)								
Miguel	Not; Eligible	Not; Eligible	Not; Eligible	Not; Eligible	Not; Eligible	Evicted (Day 7)									
Tom	Not; Eligible	Not; Eligible	Not; Eligible	Not; Eligible	Evicted (Day 6)										
Geert	Not; Eligible	Not; Eligible	Not; Eligible	Evicted (Day 5)											
Bachir	Not; Eligible	Not; Eligible	Evicted (Day 4)												
Kurt S.	Not; Eligible	Evicted (Day 3)													
Notes	1					2	3	4	5	6	7	8	9	none	
Nominated (pre-competition)	Bachir, Eric, Kurt S.	Bachir, Eric, Geert	Geert, Peter, Tom	Detlev, Eric, Tom	Eric, Miguel, Thierry	Detlev, Dirk, Peter	Dominique, Ellen, Irena, Patricia	Detlev, Dominique, Irena, Sabine	Detlev, Musti, Thierry	Aurore, DominiqueMusti, Sabine	Aurore, Dominique, Sabine	Aurore, Dominique, Kurt W., Theirry	Aurore, Ellen, Kurt W., Theirry	Aurore, Ellen, Peter, Thierry	
Saved	none						Ellen	Sabine	Musti	Dominique	Aurore	Thierry	Ellen	Aurore, Ellen, Peter, Thierry	
Against public vote	none						Dominique, Irena, Patricia	Detlev, Dominique, Irena	Detlev, Thierry	Aurore, Musti, Sabine	Dominique, Sabine	Aurore, Dominique, Kurt W.	Aurore, Kurt W., Theirry	Aurore, Ellen, Peter, Thierry	
Walked	none						Eric, Liesel	none	Dirk	none	Lincy	none			
Evicted	Kurt S. Most votes to evict	Bachir; Most votes to evict	Geert; Most votes to evict	Tom; Most votes to evict	Miguel; Most votes to evict	Dirk; Most votes to evict	Dirk; Most votes to return	Irena; Most votes to evict	Detlev; Most votes to evict	Musti; Most votes to evict	Sabine; Most votes to evict	Dominique; Most votes to evict	Kurt W. Most votes to evict	Aurore; 5% to win	Peter; 7% to win
Evicted	Kurt S. Most votes to evict	Bachir; Most votes to evict	Geert; Most votes to evict	Tom; Most votes to evict	Miguel; Most votes to evict	Dirk; Most votes to evict	Patricia; Most votes to evict	Irena; Most votes to evict	Detlev; Most votes to evict	Musti; Most votes to evict	Sabine; Most votes to evict	Dominique; Most votes to evict	Kurt W. Most votes to evict	Thierry; 34% to win	Ellen; 54% to win

=== Notes ===
- ^Note 1 : 12 Housemates entered the house on Day 1, 11 males and 1 female (Patricia). The rules were that the female had to nominate three males. The public then voted to evict one of them the next day. When the male was evicted he was replaced by a female. The new female then had to nominate three males. This process was repeated until six males were evicted and the gender was balanced in a 6-6 ratio after the first week. This was the first season of flemish Big Brother and, in ten years, so far, the only show where all the female housemates were evicted before any of the male housemates have left the house.
- ^Note 2 : Dirk was Evicted, but on his Eviction night it was decided that one of the Evicted male Housemates should be allowed back into the House, in order to even up the gender ratio to six each. Dirk won the vote and entered the House just over an hour after he left.
- ^Note 3 : Each Week the Nominated Housemates compete in a challenge to win Immunity. Irena was originally in the Nomination line-up, but won immunity and was saved.
- ^Note 4 : Sabine was initially nominated but won Immunity.
- ^Note 5 : Musti was initially nominated but won Immunity.
- ^Note 6 : Dominique was initially nominated but won Immunity.
- ^Note 7 : Aurore was initially nominated but won Immunity.
- ^Note 8 : Thierry was initially nominated but won Immunity.
- ^Note 9 : Ellen was initially nominated but won Immunity.
