= Big Brother (Belgian TV series) season 1 =

Reality television series season

Big Brother
- Season 1
- Original logo of Big Brother
- Presented by: Walter Grootaers; Sandy Blanckaert
- No. of days: 105
- No. of housemates: 13
- Winner: Steven Spillebeen
- Runner-up: Bart Van Opstal

Release
- Original network: Kanaal 2
- Original release: 3 September – 17 December 2000

Season chronology
- Next → Season 2

Big Brother 1 is the first season of the Belgian version of Big Brother aired in the Flemish Region of Belgium on Kanaal 2.

The show started on 3 September 2000 and finished on 17 December 2000 with a total duration of 106 days. Steven won 5,000,000 BEF. The kick-off show had immediately high ratings with 711,000 viewers. The highlights shows had around 800,000 viewers, the live shows got more than 1 million. The highlight of the season was the charity task, called Big Benefiet. The housemates collected more than 7 million BEF in a week. 13 housemates participated in this season. The housemates were very creative, making mini shows themselves during their stay. One of those shows named Studio Spillonimo even became an epilogue of some of the Big Brother highlights episodes. This season was the first Big Brother season ever where all-female housemates were evicted before the first male housemate was evicted.

1,584,000 viewers watched the final with 1,895,000 viewers at the moment of Steven Spillebeen was announced the winner. The ratings of this season were the most successful of all Big Brother seasons worldwide at the time.

The theme song "Leef" ("Live"), sung by band Mozaiek and Walter Grootaers remained number 1 in the hit list on Ultratop for seven weeks. The housemates' Christmas song "Brief voor Kerstmis" ("A letter for Christmas") was also ranked number 1 for three weeks. The housemates were instantly famous and were filmed in the reality documentary Het leven na Big Brother - The life after Big Brother which chronicled their lives after participating.

== Format ==
The program was first seen as a social experiment where people had to live, work together and interact which each other in a very close environment, the Big Brother house. The cameras recorded every minute of this process. At set times all participants, called housemates, had to nominate two of their fellow housemates to put up for eviction. The two housemates with the most nominations faced eviction by the audience. This made it important for the ultimate winner to be liked inside but also outside the house. The nomination process was mandatory. The nominations went on until the final week. At the final week, the public could vote for all the remaining housemates to win.

Similar to the first Big Brother in the Netherlands, the theme was Back to Basics. There was only one shower (with warm water until 10:00 am), one toilet and the furniture was basic. There wasn't much privacy, since there were only two shared bedrooms. Each housemate had a daily budget of 150BEF. Housemates could improve their situation and weekly budget by doing weekly tasks. If those tasks completed successfully, housemates would receive a higher budget. If the tasks failed, the budget would be tightened.

Big Brother was the unseen leader of the house who observed everything in his house. Each housemate was obligated to spend each day some minutes in the Diary Room where the housemate could share their thoughts and feelings with Big Brother.

== Housemates ==
Name	Age on entry	Hometown	Occupation	Day entered	Day exited	Result
Steven Spillebeen	25	Izegem	financial advisor	1	106	Winner
Bart van Opstal	25	Olen	police officer	1	106	Runner-up
Jeroen Denaeghel	29	Aalter	environmental consultant	1	106	3rd Place
Frank Molnar	26	Bree	media & pr-manager	1	99	Evicted
Glenn Verhoeven	27	Malle	diamond cutter	1	92	Evicted
Cathérine Buseyné	26	Ghent	meteorologist	1	85	Evicted
Betty Owczarek	24	Ingelmunster	butcher's wife	1	78	Evicted
Isabelle Bleuzé	24	Heusden	waitress	57	71	Evicted
Nathalie Chabas	25	Ekeren	accountant	1	52	Walked
Katrijn Verlinden	21	Kessel	student fashion management	1	43	Evicted
Edith Marin	30	Temse	model	3	29	Evicted
Marijke Peeters	45	Houthalen-Helchteren	carer of the disabled	1	15	Evicted
Murielle Dragon	29	Wemmel	human resources manager	3	5	Evicted

== Weekly summary ==
Week 1	Entrances	On Day 1, Bart, Betty, Catherine, Frank, Glenn, Jeroen, Katrijn, Marijke, Nathalie and Steven entered the house.; On Day 3 Edith & Murielle entered the house
Week 1	Tasks	On Day 2, housemates were given their first weekly task, which required them to let 3.000 balloons into the air in 15 minutes. Each balloon had to have an attached message from at least two housemates. The housemates wagered 75% on this task. The group passed the task.
Week 1	Highlights	On Day 3, Edith and Murielle were not well received by the original housemates. They had to eat at an improvised table and had to do the housekeeping.; On Day 6, Jeroen "Geronimo" and Steven "Spillie" did a call as Studio Spillonimo via the bathroom mirror to the outside world to deliver wax to the Big Brother house.; On Day 7, the housemates recorded the Song of the housemates, a cover of Toll Hanse's Big City. Bart wrote the lyrics.
Week 1	Exits	On Day 5, Murielle was evicted from the house by a unanimous vote made by the original ten housemates.
Week 1	Nominations	On Day 8, Edith and Marijke received the most nominations and faced the public vote.
Week 2	Tasks	On Day 9, the housemates were given their second weekly task, which required them to do a dance marathon from Monday until Friday without music. At least two housemates had to be dancing. If Big Brother played music, all housemates had to be on the dancefloor in 20 seconds. The housemates wagered 50% on this task. The group failed the task.
Week 2	Highlights	On Day 10, a helicopter flying over the Big Brother house throws wax into the garden, following Studio Spillonimo's call.; On Day 14, Bart and Katrijn started a romantic relationship.
Week 2	Exits	On Day 15, Marijke was evicted from the house by receiving 51% of the public vote.
Week 3	Tasks	On Day 16, the housemates were given their third weekly task, in which they had to uncover five sentences in flag signals. The housemates wagered 25% on this task. The group failed the task.
Week 3	Punishments	On Day 20, Steven refused to answer Big Brother which housemates he will nominate the next Sunday. Big Brother threatened Steven to give his self-made chess-pieces but he kept on refusing. Big Brother threatened to remove Katrijn from the house. Steven wanted to leave the house himself. Big Brother didn't let him unless he talked with the psychologist first. Steven refused and climbed madly at the roof. After two hours, he returned to the house. Big Brother let the housemates form a court to decide if Steven could stay. The other housemates decided he could stay.
Week 3	Nominations	On Day 22, Edith and Steven received the most nominations and faced the public vote.
Week 3	Entrances	On Day 22, the dog Brotherken entered the house. Since a dog wasn't allowed to be there permanently, the dog was a frequent visitor.
Week 4	Tasks	On Day 23, the housemates were given their fourth weekly task, which required the housemates to do military tasks. Each day a new task was given. The housemates worked in two teams with Frank as sergeant of team Yellow and Nathalie as sergeant of team Red. The sergeants were responsible for succeeding. They wagered 75% of their budget on the task, which they passed.
Week 4	Exits	On Day 29, Edith was evicted from the house by receiving 73% of the public vote.
Week 5	Tasks	On Day 30, housemates were given a building task. Following specific requirements, they had to build a garden pond. The dirt had to be thrown away over the fence with a pulley. The pond had to have a fountain, water, plants, fishes on Friday at 11 am. They wagered 75% of their budget on the task, which they passed.
Week 5	Highlights	On Day 32, Bart and Frank created as "Biet" and "Frimi" the cooking show Lekker Thuis in het Big Brother-Huis (Good food at home in the Big Brother house).
Week 5	Nominations	On Day 36, Betty, Catherine, Katrijn, and Steven received the most votes and faced the public vote.
Week 6	Tasks	On Day 37, housemates were given a task, in which they had to make some typical old Flemish craftsmen work - like making pottery, clogs and loom. The group wagered 100% on the task, which they failed.
Week 6	Exits	On Day 43, Katrijn was evicted from the house by receiving 50% of the public vote.
Week 7	Tasks	On Day 44, housemates were given their next task, a task for charity. The housemates had to collect during Big Benefit at least 5.000.000 BEF in a week for VZW Hachiko - an organization that trained guide dogs. The housemates wagered 100% of their shopping budget. The group passed the task more than well.
Week 7	Highlights	On Day 50, the housemates organized a festival, the Big Brother-stock for their weekly task, Big Benefiet. More than 40 artists performed. The housemates made the announcements for the artists. During Nathalie's announcement, she becomes booed by the audience.
Week 7	Nominations	On Day 50, Betty and Nathalie received the most votes and faced the public vote.
Week 8	Tasks	On Day 51, the housemates were given their weekly task, which saw them handcuffed during the week. The housemates wagered 25% of their budget on the task, refused the task which made them failing.
Week 8	Exits	On Day 52, Nathalie voluntarily left the house.
Week 8	Entrances	On Day 57, Isabelle entered the house.
Week 9	Tasks	On Day 58, the task was an own version of a Flemish tradition, the Tour of Flanders. The group was divided into two. Team A was Bart, Betty, Isabelle and Steven and team B was Catherine, Frank, Glenn and Jeroen. Each team had to do 1148 km on a bicycle on a roll. The housemates wagered 100% of their budget on the task, which they passed.
Week 9	Nominations	On Day 64, Betty and Isabelle received the most votes and faced the public vote.
Week 10	Tasks	On Day 65, for the task, the housemates were divided into four teams. Betty and Frank had to lose 5 kg together, Jeroen and Steven had to put on together 5 kg, Catherine and Isabelle had to stay the same weight and Bart and Glenn could do individual tasks to earn modifications on the weights. The housemates wagered 50% of their budget on the task, which they passed.
Week 10	Highlights	On Day 69, Bart and Jeroen formed a band Los Papagueros and sang a song to convince the viewers to keep Isabelle in the house.
Week 10	Exits	On Day 71, Isabelle was evicted from the house by receiving 60% of the public vote.
Week 11	Tasks	On Day 72, the task involved the Guinness World Records. Each day the housemates had to try to set a record to eventually set one record by the end of the week and appearing in the next edition of Guinness World Records. The housemates wagered 25% of their budget on the task, which they passed. Glenn on his own set three records by the end of this week.
Week 11	Nominations	On Day 74, Betty and Steven received the most votes and faced the public vote.
Week 11	Highlights	On Day 75, Bart and Frank organized Bartie & Frankie a drawing contest for the viewers.
Week 11	Exits	On Day 78, Betty was evicted from the house by receiving 74% of the public vote.
Week 12	Tasks	On Day 79, were given the weekly task in which each housemate had a campfire that had to stay burning. Doing individual tasks they could earn wood. The housemates wagered 25% of their budget on the task, which they failed.
Week 12	Nominations	On Day 81, Cathérine, Jeroen and Steven received the most votes and faced the public vote.
Week 12	Exits	On Day 85, Cathérine was evicted from the house by receiving 74% of the public vote.
Week 12	Punishments	On Day 85, Steven rebelled again. Hearing that Big Brother would close the door during the Live Show, he loosened the door hinges of the backdoor to the garden and threw them over the fences. Being not the first time Steven went against Big Brother, Big Brother punished Steven. He offered the choice: immediately leave the Big Brother house or doing a marathon on a treadmill in less than 8 hours. Steven accepted the punishment and did the marathon at midnight.
Week 13	Tasks	On Day 86, housemates were given the weekly task in which they traveled to history and could earn coins doing tasks. The housemates wagered 50% of their budget on the task, which they failed.
Week 13	Nominations	On Day 88, Glenn Steven received the most votes and faced the public vote.
Week 13	Exits	On Day 92, Glenn was evicted from the house by receiving 58% of the public vote.
Week 14	Tasks	On Day 93, the weekly task involved each housemate having a handicap. The housemates wagered 25% of their budget on the task and refused to start the task, failing so.
Week 14	Nominations	On Day 95, all remaining housemates (Bart, Frank, Jeroen and Steven) received the most votes and faced the public vote.
Week 14	Exits	On Day 99, Frank was evicted from the house by receiving 30% of the public vote.
Week 15	Highlights	On Day 100, Bart got a tattoo of the logo of Big Brother at his groin.
Week 15	Exits	On Day 106, Jeroen left the house in third place, Bart left the house as the runner-up, and Steven was revealed as the winner of the season.

== Nominations table ==
	Week 1	Week 2	Week 4	Week 6	Week 8	Week 10	Week 11	Week 12	Week 13	Week 14	Week 15 Final		Nominations received
Steven	Edith	Edith, Marijke	Edith, Jeroen	Jeroen, Nathalie	Catherine, Glenn	Bart, Glenn	Cathérine, Frank	Cathérine, Frank	Glenn, Frank	Frank, Jeroen	Winner (Day 106)		25
Bart	Edith	Edith, Marijke	Edith, Steven	Betty, Cathérine	Betty, Nathalie	Betty, Isabelle	Betty, Steven	Cathérine, Steven	Glenn, Steven	Frank, Steven	Runner-up (Day 106)		5
Jeroen	Edith	Edith, Marijke	Edith, Steven	Cathérine, Katrijn	Betty, Cathérine	Betty, Cathérine	Betty, Steven	Cathérine, Glenn	Glenn, Frank	Bart, Steven	Third place (Day 106)		10
Frank	Edith	Edith, Marijke	Edith, Steven	Cathérine, Steven	Betty, Nathalie	Betty, Isabelle	Betty, Steven	Jeroen, Steven	Jeroen, Steven	Bart, Jeroen	Evicted (Day 99)		10
Glenn	Edith	Nathalie, Edith	Edith, Steven	Betty, Katrijn	Betty, Nathalie	Betty, Isabelle	Betty, Steven	Jeroen, Steven	Jeroen, Steven	Evicted (Day 92)			9
Cathérine	Edith	Edith, Nathalie	Edith, Nathalie	Betty, Steven	Betty, Nathalie	Betty, Isabelle	Betty, Steven	Jeroen, Steven	Evicted (Day 85)				16
Betty	Edith	Edith, Cathérine	Edith, Steven	Cathérine, Katrijn	Bart, Nathalie	Bart, Frank	Cathérine, Frank	Evicted (Day 78)					20
Isabelle	Not in House					Betty, Glenn	Evicted (Day 71)						4
Nathalie	Edith	Edith, Marijke	Edith, Steven	Glenn, Steven	Cathérine, Glenn	Walked (Day 52)							11
Katrijn	Edith	Edith, Nathalie	Edith, Nathalie	Betty, Steven	Evicted (Day 43)								3
Edith	Nominated	Cathérine, Jeroen	Frank, Steven	Evicted (Day 29)									19
Marijke	Edith	Edith, Frank	Evicted (Day 15)										5
Murielle	Nominated	Evicted (Day 5)											N/A
Notes	1	none			2	none					3		
Nominated for eviction	Edith, Murielle	Edith, Marijke	Edith, Steven	Betty, Cathérine, Katrijn, Steven	Betty, Nathalie	Betty, Isabelle	Betty, Steven	Cathérine, Jeroen, Steven	Glenn, Steven	Bart, Frank, Jeroen, Steven	Bart, Jeroen, Steven		
Walked	none				Nathalie	none							
Evicted	Murielle; 0 of 10 votes to stay	Marijke; 50.92% to evict	Edith; 73% to evict	Katrijn; 50% to evict	Eviction; Cancelled	Isabelle; 60.35% to evict	Betty; 74% to evict	Cathérine; 74% to evict	Glenn; 58.5% to evict	Frank; 30% to evict	Jeroen; 21% to win	Bart; 38% to win	
Evicted	Murielle; 0 of 10 votes to stay	Marijke; 50.92% to evict	Edith; 73% to evict	Katrijn; 50% to evict	Eviction; Cancelled	Isabelle; 60.35% to evict	Betty; 74% to evict	Cathérine; 74% to evict	Glenn; 58.5% to evict	Frank; 30% to evict	Steven; 41% to win		

=== Notes ===
^Note 1 : Ten housemates entered the House on Day 1 and on Day 2 Edith and Murielle followed. However, on Day 5 the housemates had to choose one of these housemates to evict. Each voted for one of the housemates to stay, and all housemates chose Edith to stay, meaning Murielle was Evicted.
^Note 2 : After Nathalie walked, the public was allowed to choose her replacement. They had a choice between Caroline and Isabelle, and they chose Isabelle with 73.5% of the vote.
^Note 3 : This week, the public voted for a winner, rather than to evict.
