= Marco Simon Puccioni =

Italian film director and screenwriter

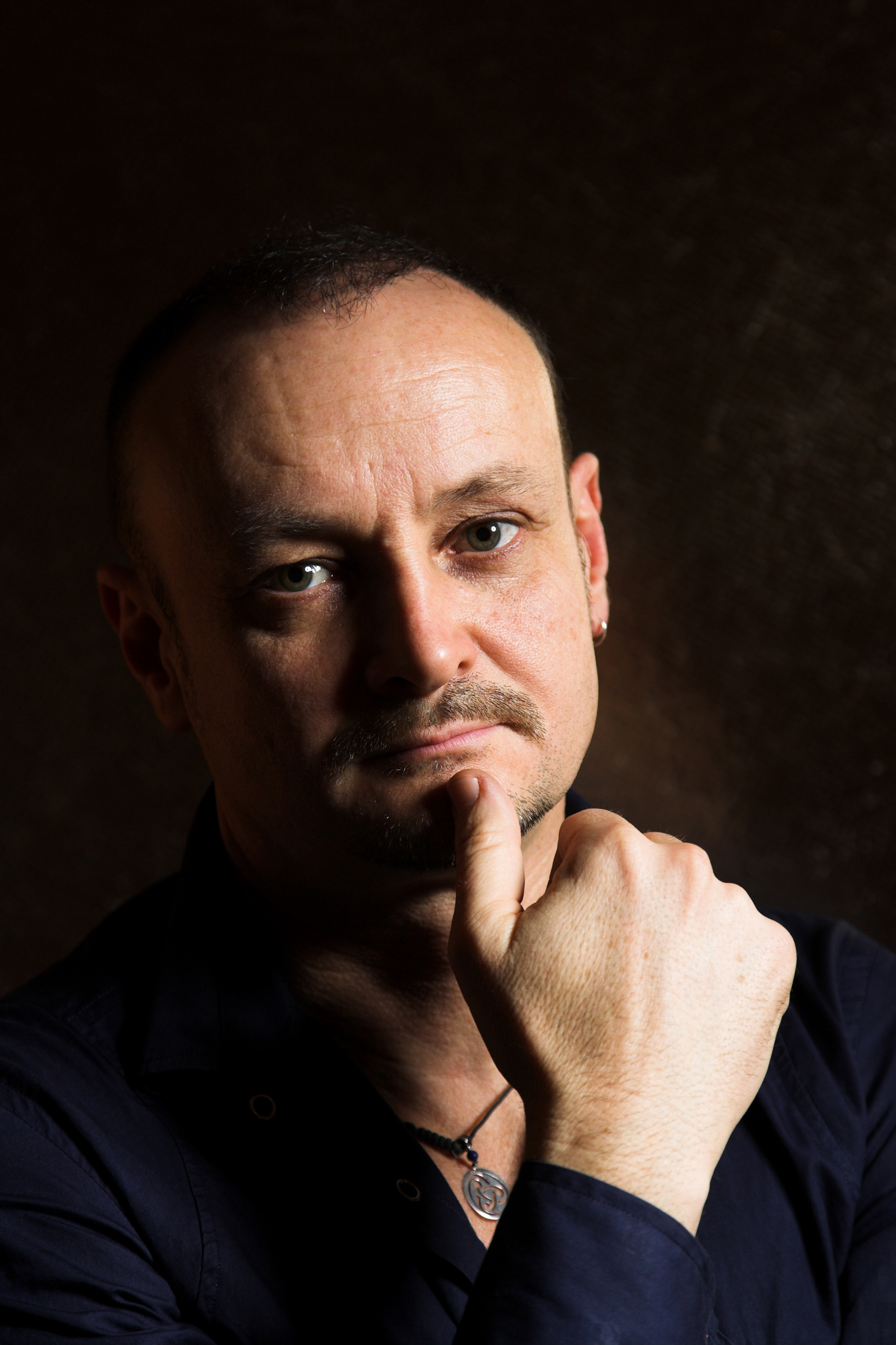
- Born: Rome, Italy
- Education: Sapienza University of Rome; California Institute of the Arts
- Occupations: Director, screenwriter
- Years active: 1991–present

Marco Simon Puccioni is an Italian film director and screenwriter.

== Biography ==
Seventh of eight children, Puccioni was born in and grew up in Rome. After graduating in architecture at the Sapienza University of Rome, he won a Fulbright scholarship that allowed him to study at CalArts in Los Angeles where he received MFA in Film and Video in 1991.

== Career ==
He started his professional career working for RAI, directing short docudramas. After directing a series of short films for the festival circuit he produced the film project Intolerance, a collective film against racism made up of shorts. He directed one of the shorts, while the others were directed by several other young Italian filmmakers such as Gabriele Muccino and Paolo Virzì, but also by veteran director Citto Maselli.

Puccioni made his full feature directorial debut in 2001 with Quello che Cerchi ("What you are looking for"). Using several digital formats, it is a road movie telling the story of a detective and a runaway teenager. The film, released in Italy in 2002, was awarded in the festival circuit and Puccioni was nominated for the 2002/2003 Italian award David di Donatello for Best New Director.

Between 2003 and 2006, he went back working for television and directed several documentaries and short films. Among those the short Corpo Immagine with the actress Piera Degli Esposti and the still unknown and young Nicolas Vaporidis was presented at the 61st Venice Film Festival.

In 2007, his second feature film Riparo (distributed as Shelter Me in the US and as Shelter in other countries) premiered at the 57th Berlin International Film Festival. Riparo was screened at the New Directors/New Films series among the over 100 festivals around the world. The film starred the international actress Maria de Medeiros and tells the story of a lesbian couple and an Arab teenager who illegally immigrated to Italy. Il Colore delle Parole ("The Color of Words") is a feature documentary that premiered at 66th Venice Film Festival about the roots and the multiple identities of the African community in Italy.

In 2012, he directed the documentary "Prima di tutto" ("Before anything else") part of a larger project entitled "My journey to meet you" about the life of same-sex families.

His feature film Come il vento ("Like the wind") was presented at the eighth Rome International film festival. The film, starring Valeria Golino, Filippo Timi, Francesco Scianna, Chiara Caselli, Marcello Mazzarella narrates the story of Armida Miserere, the first woman to direct a high security jail in Italy. The film was then released in theaters in Italy and France in 2014 with a notable reception from critics and audiences.

Between 2014 and 2019 he produced several first features of new directors, but in 2020 his new documentary Tuttinsieme ("All Together"), the second part of the "My journey to meet you" project was distributed in Italy and on Italian and foreign OTT.

His most recent work is the coming-of-age story of a boy torn between two fathers, rights, sexuality The Invisible Thread (film) (Italian: Il filo invisibile). "In this Netflix original film, produced by Viola Prestieri and Valeria Golino, the director collaborates again with Filippo Timi, Francesco Scianna as well as with the young Francesco Gheghi, Valentina Cervi, and the international star Jodhi May."

== Filmography ==
Features

- Quello che Cerchi (2001) ("What you're looking for")
- La fortezza vista da basso (2003)
- 100 anni della nostra storia (2006)
- Riparo (2007) (Shelter Me)
- Il Colore delle Parole (2009) ("The Color of words")
- Prima di tutto (2012) ("Before anything else")
- Come il vento (2013) (Like the Wind)
- Oggi insieme, domani anche (2016)
- Tuttinsieme (2020) ("All Together")
- Il Filo Invisibile (2022) ("The Invisible Thread (film)")

Shorts

- The Blue Fiction (1991) - short
- Intolerance (1996; episode "80 anni di Intolerance")
- Sell your body, Now! (1998) - short
- Corpo/Immagine (2004) - short
- Il Colpo di Pistola (2005) - short
- Remo (2023) - short
- We all fall down (2025) - short
