= Luca Guastini =

Italian actor (born 1982)

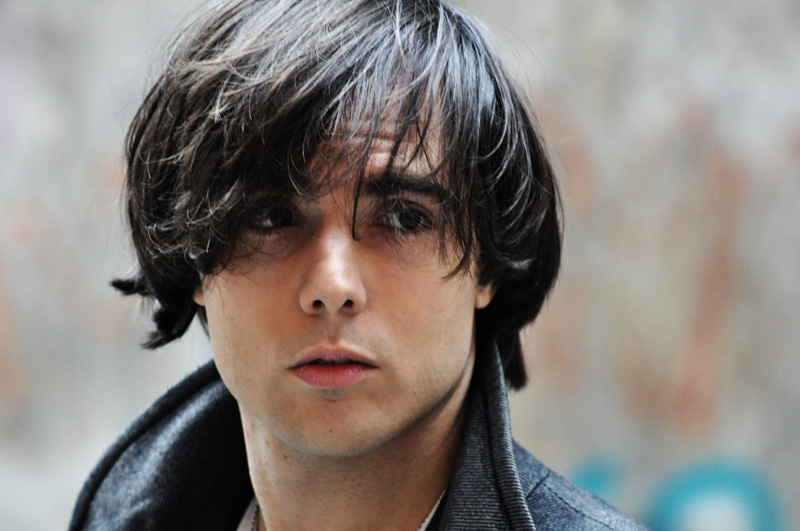
- Born: Luca Guastini; March 9, 1982 (age 44); Livorno, Italy
- Occupation: Actor
- Years active: 2004-present

Luca Guastini (born March 9, 1982, in Livorno, Italy) is an Italian actor.

== Biography ==
Guastini was born in Livorno, Italy, the son of a housewife and an office worker. He has one brother.

He began playing piano when he was 5, with the hope of becoming a musician. Guastini played in various garage bands.

Acting accidentally stepped into his life. After a few performances as a busker he will work with directors such as Serge Denoncourt, Michelangelo Ricci, Gabriele Paoli.

Guastini's first major role was in the 2010 film Exit: una storia personale, directed by Max Amato, for which he won the Prix d'Interprétation Masculine - Festival du Cinema Italien d'Annecy (2010).

In 2011, he starred in Steel, based on the Silvia Avallone novel of the same name, directed by Stefano Mordini and presented at the Venice Film Festival (2012).

In 2015, he starred in the comedy L'Universale, directed by Federico Micali and L'ospite, a biographical drama film based on the last days of the philosopher Giovanni Gentile, directed by Ugo Frosi .

== Filmography ==
=== Film ===
Year	Title	Role	Notes
2007	Traditore	Policeman	
2010	Exit: una storia personale	Marco Serrano	Prix d'Interprétation masculine - Festival du Cinema Italien d'Annecy 2010
2010	Coincidenze	Him	
2012	Steel	Cristiano	
2014	Freddy Hotel	Boy in the dream	
2015	L'ospite	Cesare	
2016	L'Universale	Marco Calamassi	
2016	Distant Vision	Pizzutti	
2018	Malerba	Gabriele	
2018	Verso un altrove	Tommaso	
2022	Ero in guerra ma non lo sapevo	Albertini	

=== Television ===
Year	Title	Role	Notes
2018	Murders at Barlume	Fanini	Episode: "La battaglia navale"
2021	Leonardo	Tornabuoni	
