= Like the Wind =

Like the Wind may refer to:

- Like the Wind (film), a 2013 Italian biopic
- "Like the Wind", Belgian entry to the Eurovision Song Contest 1999
- "Like the Wind", an alternate title of "Subways of Your Mind" by Fex
