= Big Brother VIPs (Belgian TV series) season 1 =

Big Brother VIPs
- Season 1
- No. of days: 11
- No. of housemates: 12
- Winner: Sam Gooris
- Runner-up: Harry Van Barneveld

Release
- Original network: VTM
- Original release: 4 April – 4 June 2001

Season chronology
- Next → Season 2

Big Brother VIPs 1 was the first celebrity spin-off season of the Belgian version of Big Brother aired in the Flemish Region of Belgium on VTM.

The season was recorded from 20 March 2001 and finished on 30 March 2001 with a total duration of 11 days. The season was prerecorded. The broadcast of the show started on 4 April 2001 and finished on 4 June 2001.

One of the most memorable moments of the show was the fight between Jean-Pierre Van Rossem and Betty Owczarek on Day 1, which even aired on the VTM news.

The winner was Sam Gooris. He didn't receive a money prize but a statue of a golden keyhole.

Since the show was prerecorded and the developments in the house had to be kept secret until the show aired. First evicted housemate Jean-Pierre Van Rossem appeared immediately after his eviction in written media and television programs, talking about the show. Therefore, he broke the contract to be silent, he wasn't paid by the broadcaster. It was decided to air the show faster than its anticipated, although producers stated the decision had nothing to do with Van Rossem's behavior.

This season received high ratings and appeared on the list of best-watched shows of 2001 with having more than one million viewers.

== Format ==
The VIPs season followed the same concept as the regular season. Differences were that there were no weekly tasks but daily tasks, no public votes for evictions, instead, the celebrity housemates were directly evicted by their housemates when having the most nominations and no live show. In comparison with the regular season, the VIPs season was completely prerecorded. The camera's in the shower and toilet were also switched off.

Since all the celebrity housemates got paid for every day in the house, the winner didn't receive a money prize, but a statue.

== Housemates ==
| Name | Age on entry | Famous for... | Day entered | Day exited | Result |
|---|---|---|---|---|---|
| Sam Gooris | 28 | Singer | 1 | 11 | Winner |
| Harry Van Barneveld | 34 | Judo | 1 | 11 | Runner-up |
| Brigitta Callens | 20 | Model, Miss Belgium 1999 | 1 | 11 | 3rd Place |
| Leo Van der Elst | 38 | Former Red Devil, Football coach | 1 | 11 | 4th Place |
| Eveline Hoste | 19 | Photomodel, Miss Belgian Beauty 2001 | 1 | 10 | Evicted |
| Joke Van de Velde | 20 | Miss Belgium 2000, Photomodel, Stylist | 1 | 9 | Evicted |
| Alana Dante | 31 | Singer | 1 | 8 | Evicted |
| Eddy Planckaert | 42 | Cyclist | 1 | 7 | Evicted |
| Martine Jonckheere | 44 | Actress | 1 | 6 | Evicted |
| Luc Steeno | 36 | Singer | 1 | 5 | Evicted |
| Betty Owczarek | 24 | Big Brother 1 housemate, Singer | 1 | 4 | Evicted |
| Jean-Pierre Van Rossem | 55 | Economist, Politician | 1 | 3 | Evicted |

== Daily summary ==
Day 1
| Day 1 | Entrances | Alana, Betty, Brigitta, Eddy, Eveline, Harry, Jean-Pierre, Joke, Leo, Luc, Martine and Sam entered the house. |
| Day 1 | Highlights | Jean-Pierre threatened to leave as soon as Betty arrived. He didn't want to live with her in one house, believing she was famous for the wrong reasons. Betty responded by saying Jean-Pierre himself was also famous for the wrong reasons, referring to all the scandals involving Jean-Pierre. Jean-Pierre ultimately stayed. |
Day 2
| Day 2 | Tasks | Cows were placed in the garden. Housemates had to milk them and make butter of it. |
| Day 2 | Highlights | Jean-Pierre wanted to break down the Big Brother house, grabbed an axe, and called the other housemates to join him. Other housemates pulled out when Big Brother gave a warning. Jean-Pierre gave reluctantly in. |
Day 3
| Day 3 | Tasks | Housemates had to fill the servant using pipelines coming from behind the fence. |
| Day 3 | Exits | Jean-Pierre was evicted from the house by the other housemates. |
Day 4
| Day 4 | Tasks | Change of sexes: male housemates had to knit a sweater, female housemates had to build a bbq. |
| Day 4 | Exits | Betty was evicted from the house by the other housemates. |
Day 5
| Day 5 | Tasks | Housemates received bicycle parts and put the bikes back together. |
| Day 5 | Exits | Luc was evicted from the house by the other housemates. |
Day 6
| Day 6 | Tasks | Housemates had to wear skis. At certain signs, portraits of other celebrities were shown above the fence. At the sign, housemates had to get outside and recognize the portrait in five seconds. Housemates had to recognize ten VIPs in total. |
| Day 6 | Exits | Martine was evicted from the house by the other housemates. |
Day 7
| Day 7 | Tasks | Housemates had to create a Big Brother song and sing something particular about every housemate. |
| Day 7 | Exits | Eddy was evicted from the house by the other housemates. |
Day 8
| Day 8 | Tasks | Housemates received boxes with grapes. They had to place it in the storvatt, make wine from it and mark the bottles with a Big Brother certificate. |
| Day 8 | Exits | Alana was evicted from the house by the other housemates. |
Day 9
| Day 9 | Tasks | Housemates had to do endurance tasks. |
| Day 9 | Exits | Joke was evicted from the house by the other housemates. |
Day 10
| Day 10 | Tasks | Big Brother went Japanese. Female housemates had to dress up as geishas, male housemates as Sumo wrestlers, and complete household tasks this way. |
| Day 10 | Exits | Eveline was evicted from the house by the other housemates. |
Day 11
| Day 11 | Tasks | Housemates had to empty the storvatt with the boots they wore. The slowest would leave the house. Leo was the slowest.; Every housemate had a candle which he had to keep burning. Brigitta's candle went out earliest, so she had to leave the house.; A tower of full glasses with champagne was built. The two remaining housemates have to take each turn glass and drink it. The housemate that made the tower fall, had to leave the house. This was Harry. |
| Day 11 | Exits | Leo left the house in fourth place.; Brigitta left the house in third place.; Harry left the house as runner-up.; Sam left the house as the winner. |

== Nominations table ==
| | Day 2 | Day 3 | Day 4 | Day 5 | Day 6 | Day 7 | Day 8 | Day 9 | Day 10 Final | |
|---|---|---|---|---|---|---|---|---|---|---|
| Sam | ? ? | ? ? | ? ? | ? ? | ? ? | ? ? | ? ? | ? ? | Winner (Day 10) | |
| Harry | ? ? | ? ? | ? ? | ? ? | ? ? | ? ? | ? ? | ? ? | Runner-up (Day 10) | |
| Brigitta | ? ? | ? ? | ? ? | ? ? | ? ? | ? ? | ? ? | ? ? | Third place (Day 10) | |
| Leo | ? ? | ? ? | ? ? | ? ? | ? ? | ? ? | ? ? | ? ? | Fourth place (Day 10) | |
| Eveline | ? ? | ? ? | ? ? | ? ? | ? ? | ? ? | ? ? | ? ? | Evicted (Day 9) | |
| Joke | ? ? | ? ? | ? ? | ? ? | ? ? | ? ? | ? ? | Evicted (Day 8) | | |
| Alana | ? ? | ? ? | ? ? | ? ? | ? ? | ? ? | Evicted (Day 7) | | | |
| Eddy | ? ? | ? ? | ? ? | ? ? | ? ? | Evicted (Day 6) | | | | |
| Martine | ? ? | ? ? | ? ? | ? ? | Evicted (Day 5) | | | | | |
| Luc | ? ? | ? ? | ? ? | Evicted (Day 4) | | | | | | |
| Betty | ? ? | ? ? | Evicted (Day 3) | | | | | | | |
| Jean-Pierre | ? ? | Evicted (Day 2) | | | | | | | | |
| Evicted | Jean-Pierre | Betty | Luc | Martine | Eddy | Alana | Joke | Eveline | Leo | Brigitta |
| Evicted | Jean-Pierre | Betty | Luc | Martine | Eddy | Alana | Joke | Eveline | Harry | Sam |

A series of competitions were held to determine the winner.
- Day 10 (Final; Part 1): The hot tub had to be emptied with boots. The water had to be transported to boxes. Every candidate has his own box. The slowest candidate would be the fourth runner-up. This was Leo.
- Day 10 (Final: Part 2): Every candidate had to keep its own candle as long burning as possible. It was allowed to try to blow out the candle of the others. Brigitta lost and was the third runner-up.
- Day 10 (Final: Part 3): A tower of full glasses with champagne is built at the table. The two finalists have to take their turn glass and drink it. The one that makes the tower fall over is the second runner up. This was Harry, which makes Sam the winner.
