= Best Actor Award (Annecy Italian Film Festival) =

The Best Actor Award (French: Prix d'interprétation masculine) is an award presented at the Annecy Italian Film Festival. It is chosen by the jury from the 'official section' of movies at the festival. It was first awarded in 2002.

== Award winners ==
Year	Film	Actor
2002	Velocità massima	Valerio Mastandrea
2003	Liberi	Elio Germano
2004	Fame chimica	Marco Foschi
2005	E se domani...	Paolo Kessisoglu, Luca Bizzarri
2006	4-4-2 - Il gioco più bello del mondo	Gigio Alberti
2007	L'uomo di vetro	David Coco
2008	Aspettando	Giuseppe Cederna
2009	Diverso da chi ?	Filippo Nigro
2010	Exit: una storia personale	Luca Guastini
