= Annecy Film Festival Award for Best Actress =

The Best Actress Award (French: Prix d'interprétation féminine) is an award presented at the Annecy Italian Film Festival. It is chosen by the jury from the 'official section' of movies at the festival. It was first awarded in 2002.

== Award winners ==
Year	Film	Actress
2002	Vecchie	Barbara Valmorin, Maria Grazia Grassini
2002	Gasoline	Maya Sansa, Regina Orioli
2003	not awarded	
2004	The Spectator	Barbara Bobulova
2005	E se domani...	Sabrina Impacciatore
2006	Ma che ci faccio qui!	Chiara Nicola
2007	Riparo	Antonia Liskova
2008	Good Morning Heartache	Alba Caterina Rohrwacher
2009	La Pivellina	Patrizia Gerardi
2010	Hai paura del buio	Alexandra Pirici
