= Riparo =

2007 film by Marco Simon Puccioni

Shelter
- Theatrical release poster
- Riparo
- Directed by: Marco Simon Puccioni
- Screenplay by: Marco Simon Puccioni; Monica Rametta; Heidrun Schleef
- Produced by: Mario Mazzarotto; Gustavo Solis-Moya; Francesca Van Der Staay
- Starring: Maria de Medeiros; Antonia Liskova; Mounir Ouadi
- Cinematography: Tarek Ben Abdallah
- Edited by: Roberto Missiroli
- Music by: Dario Arcidiacono; Cristiano Fracaro
- Production companies: Intelfilm; Adesif Productions; Rai Cinema; Ministero per i Beni e le Attività Culturali (MiBAC); MEDIA Programme of the European Union; Eurimages; Friuli Venezia Giulia Film Commission; Inthelfilm
- Distributed by: Wolfe Releasing (USA); Movimento Film (Italy)
- Release dates: 13 February 2007 (Germany); 18 January 2008 (Italy)
- Running time: 98 minutes
- Countries: Italy, France
- Language: Italian
- Budget: $130,000

Shelter (Italian: Riparo) aka Shelter Me is a 2007 Italian romantic drama film co-written and directed by Marco Simon Puccioni and starring Maria de Medeiros, Antonia Liskova, and Mounir Ouadi. The film was presented at the 57th Berlin International Film Festival in 2007.

== Cast ==
Actor	Role
Maria de Medeiros	Anna
Antonia Liskova	Mara
Mounir Ouadi	Anis
Gisella Burinato	Anna's Mother
Vitaliano Trevisan	Salvio
Steffan Boje	Priest
Gerhard Koloneci	Mishel
Alex Predonzan	Alex

== Awards and nominations ==
The film received the Grand Prix award from the Annecy Italian Film Festival.

- 2007 - Annecy Italian Film Festival
  - Best Actress Award: Antonia Liskova
- 2008 - David di Donatello
  - Nominated for Best Actress: Antonia Liskova
- 2008 - Nastro d'Argento
  - European Nastro d'Argento: Antonia Liskova
- 2008 - Globo d'oro
  - Best Actress in Appearance: Antonia Liskova
  - Best European Actress: Maria de Medeiros
  - Nominated for Best Actress: Antonia Liskova
