= Annecy Film Festival =

Annecy Film Festival may refer to:

- Annecy International Animation Film Festival
- Annecy Italian Film Festival
