= Anderz =

Social libertarian Resistance Anderz Sociaal – Libertijns Verzet Anderz
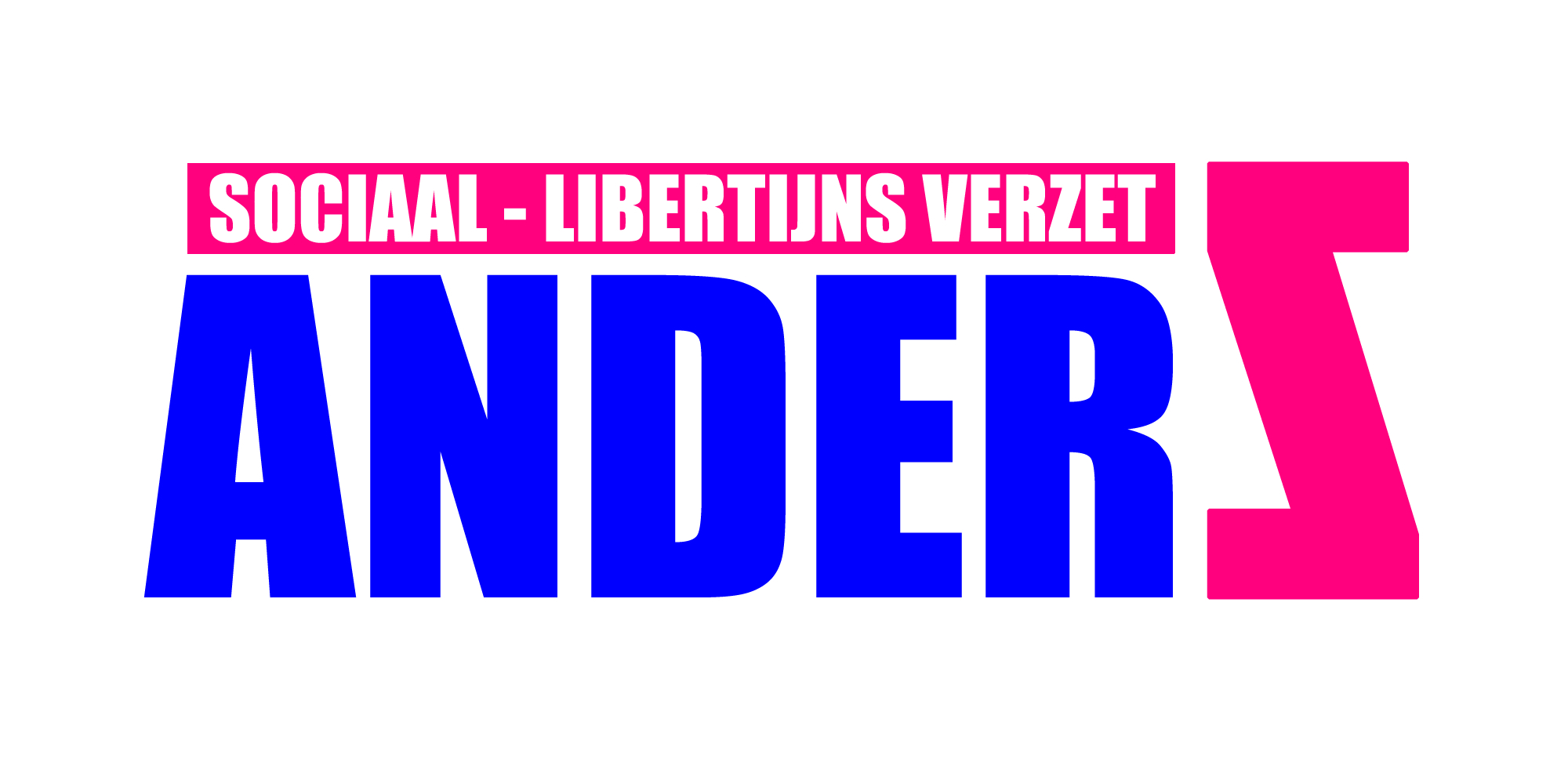
- President: Olivier van Cranenbrouck
- Vice President: Patrick Symons
- Youth President: Wesley Claeys
- Secretary: Sin Lallemand
- Marketing Manager: Isai Symens
- Founder: Jean Pierre Van Rossem
- Founded: 1991 (ROSSEM); 2012 (ROSSEM II); 2014 (Anderz)
- Dissolved: December 2014
- Preceded by: ROSSEM
- Succeeded by: Think-Thank Daniel Huet II
- Headquarters: Ernest Ourystraat 16, 3320 Hoegaarden
- Think tank: Daniel Huet II
- Youth wing: Jong AnderZ (Young AnderZ)
- Ideology: Civil libertarianism
- Political position: Left-wing

Website
- ander-z.com

Sociaal – Libertijns Verzet Anderz (English: Social Libertarian Resistance Different) was a libertarian political party in Belgium founded in 2014 by Jean-Pierre Van Rossem, an author, economist, and former member of Parliament.

== History ==
The party was founded in June 2014 by Jean-Pierre Van Rossem and 5 other members after the dissolution of Rossem after losing the election of the European, Flemish and Belgian federal elections in May 2014.

Anderz was originally meant as a resistance movement which later grew into a political party; the intention was to provide a realistic view on practical out of the box ideas, for these ideas, the party worked closely together with the independent libertarian think-tank "Daniel Huet II" specialized in macro economic studies, the main focus was on world politics, the financial sector and the postmodern society, the program of the party was also developed by think-tank "Daniel Huet II" and could be viewed as a new sound in politics, no member of the think-tank was a member of the party to keep a maximum Independence.

The party had also a youth wing called Jong Anderz (translated: Young & Different) led by Wesley Claeys.

== Program ==
The program that was developed by the independent think-tank Daniel Huet II and consisted out of 10 main subjects focusing on economy, minimal government intervention, more social life and more freedom through less government and less patronizing policy.

=== Restoring democracy ===
Included among other things the de-manipulation of politics in mass media and the equalization of party means to promote themselves in times of campaign.

=== Polity structure ===
Focused on a smaller government with less governmental levels of structure and the banning of the Belgian monarchy.

=== Foreign policy ===
Included a less dependent role in the participation of NATO and the formation of a European army, the removal of American nuclear weapons on Belgian soil, and trade deals deemed to be more beneficial to Belgian local interests based on greater solidarity between north and south.

=== Safety and crime ===
Was mainly focusing on a criminal metric model based on the view that the penalty for crimes should be likely increased, but the average sentence length should be reduced, and the deportation of foreign criminals with penalties higher than 5 year.

=== Environment ===
Anderz advocates for nuclear power and more on renewable energy sources such as wind and solar.

=== Economy ===
Anderz advocates for less tax for lower income taxpayers as well as less taxation on small businesses. While advocating for the introduction of a so-called "millionaire tax", a social holding capitalized with peoples funds and company investments to build 50,000 new homes, a legal system that prevents savings banks to merge with trader banks, creation of an emergency fund to save banks in times of crisis, creation of a European banking union, and the creation of social schools for truants.

=== Health ===
Included a Complete review of the treatment and collocation of psychiatric patients and prescribing medications such as lithium in bipolar disorder or methylphenidate in these difficult to diagnose disorders such as ADHD, the Ban of buckling psychiatric patients during psychosis. and the Revaluation of the anti-psychiatry by Karel Ringoet.

=== People and society ===
Included Lowering the abolition of road tax for all road users, a reform of the pension system, an electronic Registration procedure for primary and secondary schools, compulsory courses economy and sociology in secondary education by abolishing religious instruction; at least 60 hours teaching macroeconomics and 60 hours teaching sociology at university all directions, a lifting ban on smoking in bars and restaurants, smoking section in hospitals and retirement homes, the legalization of cannabis use, the closing of inhumane prisons, more efforts to provide homeless shelter; equal rights for man and woman, elimination of all forms of discrimination. Mandatory making an emergency-year language courses for new immigrants, stricter control profiteering and religious freedom.

=== Animal rights ===
Focused in short on the statement Mahatma Gandhi remembered that the degree of civilization of a nation can be measured by how it treats animals, the Universal Declaration of Animal Rights and a ban on keeping animals after being convicted of abuse or neglect of animals.

== Dissolution ==
The Party dissolved disruptively on 8 December 2014 due to financial problems and the separation of the think-thank "Daniel Huet II"
