= Exit: una storia personale =

2010 Italian indie drama film

- Italian theatrical release poster
- Directed by: Massimiliano Amato
- Written by: Massimiliano Amato
- Produced by: Massimiliano Amato
- Starring: Luca Guastini; Nicola Garofalo; Marcella Braga; Paolo Di Gialluca; Antonio Calamonici
- Cinematography: Massimiliano Amato
- Edited by: Lorenzo Morganti
- Distributed by: Les Grands Films Classiques (France)
- Release date: October 2, 2010 (Festival du Cinéma Italien d'Annecy)
- Running time: 85 minutes
- Countries: Italy; Netherlands
- Language: Italian
- Budget: € 25,000

Exit: una storia personale (Exit: a personal history), is a 2010 Italian indie drama film written and directed by Massimiliano Amato and starring Luca Guastini, Nicola Garofalo, Marcella Braga, Paolo Di Gialluca and Antonio Calamonici. The film depicts an intimate portrait of a man suffering from mental anguish and his relationship with his brother.

The film won the Prix d'Interpretation Masculine (Luca Guastini) and Mention Spéciale CICAE - Pierre Todeschini (Massimiliano Amato) at the Festival du Cinéma Italien d'Annecy 2010.

== Plot ==
After his roommate committed suicide, Marco (Luca Guastini) begins to realize that his life is very similar to his friend's. Perhaps even more hopeless. A lack of prospects and a strong sense of inadequacy only darken his mood. Deep in crisis, the young man asks his brother Davide (Nicola Garofalo) to travel with him to the Netherlands, where he wants to accomplish what his friend Maurizio (Antonio Calamonici) had so lucidly planned to accomplish: assisted suicide. He confesses that he wants to end it all, he wants to stop being such an outsider, stop the suffering.

Davide, who has gotten used to his brother's crises and ravings over the years, does not give his requests the least credence. He does not know – he cannot know – that Marco's plan has at least a semblance of plausibility. Indeed, the Dutch protocol on euthanasia extends to the category of mental distress.

The day after the two of them talk, Marco runs away from the Community where he is living, and takes a train to Amsterdam, intent on completing his desperate mission. At the very moment when he is trying to save his relationship with Nina (Marcella Braga), Davide is forced to acknowledge the gravity of the situation and leave for the Netherlands. Tired as she may be of watching what she considers to be a sadistic game, Nina is not prepared to leave Davide to face this crisis alone. The unexpected journey offers an opportunity for the couple to be together again, after a period of separation.

On reaching Amsterdam, Marco loses himself in this city of bright lights and attractions. Almost forgetting why he travelled there in the first place, he roams around on a bike, with no particular place to go. He is very much cast adrift, but then he also feels more free than he ever has before. Like a condemned man, he allows itself one last wish: an intimate relationship with a woman – a prostitute (Joanna Pavoni).

Meanwhile, Davide and Nina have made it to Amsterdam and started to try to find him. One evening, completely by chance, Davide sees his brother streak by on a bicycle. He races after him, and in the end manages to block him near the port. They have a massive argument. Marco has no intention of giving up on his quest, but Davide manages to persuade him that his suicide mission is impracticable. The doctors he has spoken to have told him in no uncertain terms that Marco's condition is not eligible for euthanasia. And even if his condition was eligible, as a foreign citizen he would still not qualify for assisted suicide. Marco has to face the facts and give up.

The three of them head home. They fly to Pisa, and then drive the rest of the way to Rome. En route, Davide nods off and they are very lucky not to be involved in a car wreck. Davide decides to turn off the main road and find somewhere to stop and have a snooze. The three of them, all exhausted, fall asleep in the car. A magnificent dawn lights up a desolate and uninhabited stretch of Mediterranean countryside. A passing train wakes Marco. The young man sneaks out of the car. Nina and Davide are still fast asleep as he strides away from them. Nina wakes up soon after, and realizes that Marco is gone. This is the point at which the epilogue starts, then it is the beginning of the film.

Nina wakes Davide. They come out of the car and go looking for him. Marco, wandering in this wilderness, arrives by chance at a beach. After a few moments, he instinctively throws himself into the sea. Davide reaches Marco and seeing him in the water, he throws too. The film ends on Nina, Davide and Marco, the two still wet, returning to Rome.

== Cast ==
- Luca Guastini as Marco Serrano
- Nicola Garofalo as Davide Serrano
- Marcella Braga as Nina
- Paolo Di Gialluca as Doctor Caracci
- Antonio Calamonici as Maurizio
- Paola Frediani as Sara
- Diego Bottiglieri as Maurizio’s friend
- Marco Cortesi as Francesco
- Saroja Alasko as Anna
- Claudio Spadola as Editor
- Margherita Mastrone as Daniela
- Katia Nani as Editor
- Fabio Valletta as Daniela’s boyfriend
- Joanna Pavoni as Dutch prostitute
- Fabio De Caro as Healthcare manager
- Azzurra Rocchi as Girl in the tunnel
- Giuseppe Iacono as Island boy
- Paolo Pipitone as Healthcare manager
- Aurin Proietti as Dutch healthcare manager
- Sergio Toscano as Nick
- Alessandro Rossetti as SPDC nurse
- Pierfrancesco Sampaolo as SPDC doctor
- Michela Parzanese as Community doctor
- Andrea Spila as Editor
- Federico Firmani as Gianni
- Costantino Comito as Community nurse
- Angelica Novak as Carla
- Vincenzo Scuruchi as Volunteer
- Catalina Bularda as Community patient
- Pierre Bresolin as Francesco's father
- Carmen Di Marzo as SPDC Patient
- Pino Torcasio as Peppe
- Antonio Fazio as Mirco
- Gianluca Testa as Young man in bar #1
- Claudio Caminito as Young man in bar #2
- Simona Padovini as Carla’s mother
- Margherita Bonanno as Maurizio’s sister

== Production ==
The spark that inspired the plot was meeting a young man who told Amato he was planning to go to the Netherlands for an assisted suicide (See the law on Euthanasia in the Netherlands and the Chabot case, 1991–95). The young man was convinced that this was his only way of ending an existence that he considered to lack any dignity. As far as he was concerned, life was endless suffering. Though it has been rumoured that certain Dutch facilities have in the past agreed to practice euthanasia on foreign patients, in fact it would be impossible for a variety of reasons. In the end, the young man took his own life, without seeking anybody else’s help.

Though from Amato's point of view this film is not really about euthanasia, the film deals with this topic. What director was most interested in revealing was, foremost, an intimate portrait of a man suffering from mental anguish and his relationship with his brother, rather than the medical, social and ethical questions that surround the matter, though the film does indeed tackle these issues head on.

=== Filming ===
The screenplay was completed in 2001 and had already been optioned by two producers and presented to MiBAC. The huge production delays were the main reason that led Massimiliano Amato to decide to produce it independently.

The entire film was shot without any crew and background support at all, Amato has described the production model as "a complete lack of structure".

== Release ==
The official premiere was on 2 October 2010 at the Festival du Cinéma Italien d'Annecy, France.

Theaters premiere occurred still in France, 23 February 2011, at the cinema Espace Saint -Michel in Paris, distributed by Les Grands Films Classiques.

In United States, Exit una storia personale was released on DVD on 28 January 2011, distributed by CreateSpace.

On the web, video on demand release was distributed by Distrify and Indieflix.

== Critical reception ==
The film received widespread critical acclaim in France. Writing for l'Humanité, Vincent Ostria called the movie "almost a contemporary novel, one of the best movies of the moment". Marie-Noëlle Tranchant of Le Figaro praised the film, saying, "anxiety, tenderness, fatigue and impotence represented with a disarming truth".

== Awards and nominations ==
| Award | Category | Recipients and nominees | Result |
|---|---|---|---|
| Annecy Cinéma Italien 2010 | Prix d'Interpretation Masculine | Luca Guastini | Won |
| Annecy Cinéma Italien 2010 | Prix CICAE - Pierre Todeschini | Massimiliano Amato | Special Mention |
| Rassegna Cinematografica CinemAnimaMente Cesena 2011 | Panorama | Massimiliano Amato | Selected |
| Roma3 Film Teatro Festival 2011 | Indie | Massimiliano Amato | Selected |
| Premio Monty Banks 2011 | In Concorso | Massimiliano Amato | Nominated |
| Maya Film Festival 2011 | Panorama | Massimiliano Amato | Selected |
