= Sebastiano Mauri =

Italian actor (born 1972)

- Born: 15 February 1972 (age 54); Milan, Lombardy, Italy
- Occupations: Artist; director; writer
- Years active: 1999–present
- Spouse: Filippo Timi (m. 2016; div. 2021)

Sebastiano Mauri (born 15 February 1972) is an Italian actor, director and writer.

== Biography ==
Sebastiano Mauri was born in Milan to an Italian father and Argentinian mother. He is the nephew of Fabio Mauri, a prominent Italian multi-disciplinary artist. At the age of 20, Sebastiano Mauri went to New York and enrolled at New York University to study cinematography. After graduation, he emerged as a short film director. Some of his movies have brought him prestigious accolades, such as the Warner Brothers Award and the Martin Scorsese Post-Production Award. Mauri lived in Buenos Aires for several years before moving to London and enrolling at the Byam Shaw School to study art. He was active as an artist and had dozens of personal exhibitions around the world. In 2014, personals exhibitions of Mauri were opened at the Galleria Michela Rizzo in Venezian Giudecca and in Milan's La Otto Zoo. A recurring theme in Mauri's work is the exposure of the mechanisms of discrimination inherent in human beings.

In 2012 Mauri made his debut as a writer with the novel Goditi il problema, a well-received light-hearted novel about discovering one's own sexuality and the struggles it brings in relationship with the rest of the world. His second writing effort, Il giorno più felice della mia vita, is an essay on same-sex marriage and why it is still a taboo in Italy. The book was published by Casa Editrice Rizzi in 2015. In 2021, Mauri released his third book – La nuova terra, a partially autobiographical story about his travel to Amazonia.

Mauri debuted as cinema director in 2018 with the surreal black comedy Favola, based on a theater play created by his then spouse Filippo Timi. The film brought Mauri the prestigious Italian award Flaiano Opera Prima 2018.
