= Gianluca Testa =

Italian actor, voice actor, director and singer-songwriter

- Born: 2 March 1982 (age 44); Rome, Lazio, Italy
- Genres: Pop; rock; blues; folk
- Occupations: Actor; voice actor; director; singer; songwriter
- Years active: 2002–present
- Label: Teatroformattivo Dischi (2002–present)
- Website: https://gianlucatesta.net/

Gianluca Testa (Italian pronunciation: [dʒanˈluːka ˈtɛsta]; born March 2 1982) is an Italian actor, voice actor, director and singer-songwriter.

== Biography ==
Gianluca Testa began his acting career in theater productions and independent cinema, later appearing in about thirty films and television series. In theater he collaborated with Giuliano Vasilicò, playing the role of San Giovanni for three years in Dal Vangelo secondo Giovanni and worked with Giancarlo Nanni and the Teatro Vascello in Rome from 2006 to 2009. In 2006 he appeared in the official music video of Raf in the song Dimentica. After debuting in the soap opera Incantesimo, he played Mirko Bertolini in the miniseries Inspector Rex (2008 - 2015) on Rai 1, Canal+ France and Sat 1. He also played the role of Francesco Ticconi in the television series Carabinieri (2002-2008) on Canale 5. He later plays Brenno in the film Pipì Room directed by Jerry Calà and plays in Calibro 10 with Franco Nero. He played the lead role of Davide in the horror film Mad in Italy - Birth of a Serial Killer, distributed in the USA by Elite Entertainment and on Amazon Prime Video. The film was well received by American critics, who expressed favorable opinions on his interpretation. He plays the lead role in other genre films such as A sei giorni dalla fine, winner of the Jury Prize at the Tohorror Fantastic Film Fest and Abisso nero, directed by Gaetano Russo, released in theaters in 2021 and later on Amazon Prime Video, but also in socially committed films such as All Human Rights for All, directed among others by Carlo Lizzani, Pasquale Scimeca and Giovanni Veronesi, in which he stars with Roberto Herlitzka, Valerio Mastandrea, Marco Giallini and Rocco Papaleo. Actor in dozens of commercials for various brands, in 2019 he is a testimonial for the Italian Ministry of Health for the information campaign on the correct use of cell phones and is the protagonist of 5 commercials broadcast on RAI networks entitled Your cell phone is intelligent. He has also been active, since the early 2000s, as a voice actor and documentary voice for satellite channels. In advertising dubbing he is the voice of television commercials for Miwa Energia; Bnp Paribas; Aeronautica Militare; Confcommercio; Molise Region; Valencia Tourist Board; Finmeccanica and in 2024 he was the official voice of the event Amori e sogni di stelle di fuoco for Cinecittà World Spa. In the field of audiobook narration he has interpreted more than 100 works distributed on Storytel, Audible, Mondadori Store, Feltrinelli IBS and other online bookstores.

Also active as a director, since 2002 he has directed commercials and music videos for Video Italia, MTV, Sky, Rai and Mediaset. He is the author of over thirty experimental cinematographic works and a feature film for the cinema. In 2019 he brought Athina Cenci back to the scene, directing her in two short films: Dolce rosa and I bambini di Scampia, both winners of various awards. He wrote and directed the feature film Gnothi Seauton - The Secret of the Leader, which features the historian and economist Giulio Sapelli. The movie will be released in Italian and international theaters in 2021 and will compete at the David di Donatello for various categories including Best Italian Film, Best Director and Best Original Screenplay. The film also won the Grottammare Film Festival in the Best Director, Best Screenplay and Best Film categories. In the music field, Gianluca Testa has recorded several albums and singles as a singer-songwriter, under his own name and under the pseudonym "Teatro della Crudeltà", and has composed musicals for the theater and soundtracks for the cinema.

He is also active as a coach, teacher and researcher in the field of acting.

== Selected filmography ==
=== TV ===
- Incantesimo - TV series
- Rex - TV series
- Carabinieri TV Series
- Barnum Bar Sit Com
- L'italia dei porti Sit Com
- Pipì Room TV Movie

=== Actor ===
- Mad in Italy - Birth of a Serial Killer
- Come una crisalide
- All Human Rights for All
- A 6 giorni dalla fine
- Symphony in Blood Red
- Daimon
- Il vento fra le mura
- L'italia ci appartiene
- Calibro 10
- La progenie del diavolo
- Come la vita
- L'accordo sbagliato
- Back Off
- Diamante
- Routine
- Exit: una storia personale
- Voce dall'inferno
- Il custode
- Sumerika - La profezia continua
- Inanna Hotel
- Dark Hours
- Concept
- Il prezzo del gioco
- Scoop&Go
- Non da sola

=== Actor, Director and Screenwriter ===
- Gnothi Seauton - Il segreto del Leader - feature film
- GRA 33 - La stradale - TV movie
- Monty Hall - short film
- Laplacianus - medium length film
- Riccardo la solitudine dell’ambizione feature film
- Il giorno di San Crispino - medium length film
- Bozo Explosion - short film
- La strategia del prigioniero - short film
- L'improbabile mondo del Mago di Odds - medium length film
- Una stella, un amore e una guerra - short film
- Banza Kiri! - medium length film
- Dolce rosa - short film
- I bambini di Scampia - short film
- In limine - short film
- Mary - short film
- Il bambino e il barbone - short film
- The Secret of Leadership - short film
- The Avenger - Nessuno è al sicuro - medium length film
- Fagiolino e il cavaliere - short film
- L'ultimo appuntamento - short film
- Eenz! - short film
- Satchmo - short film
- Emozionati alla vita - short film
- Nomade digitale -music video
- Oltre il giardino - music video
- Ti sembra poco -music video
- Un viaggio -music video
- Lei -music video
- La tua voce -music video
- Duro impegno per vivere male -music video

== Music Videos ==
=== Actor ===
- Dimentica, Raf (2006)
- Mad in Italy, Fog Prisons (2010)
- Maniaco italiano, Menti criminali (2010)

== Theatre ==
=== Actor ===
- 2007 Giulio Cesare di Shakespeare - Passaggi Segreti - Regia di Roberto Marafante - Teatro dei Servi
- 2006 - 2008 In cammino per Oz - Regia di Giancarlo Nanni - Teatro Vascello - leading actor
- 2009 - 2011 Dal Vangelo Secondo Giovanni - Regia di Giuliano Vasilicò - Teatro del Giglio - leading actor
- 2010 - 2011 Syd, l'altra faccia della luna - Teatro Comunale di Atri - leading actor
- 2010 Giulio Cesare - Fori Imperiali - Settimana della Cultura - leading actor
- 2010 - 2013 - Antonio e Cleopatra - Fori Imperiali - leading actor
- 2011 - 2014 - The Meaning of The Death - Cimitero Acattolico - leading actor
- 2010 - 2015 - Viaggio in Italia - Villa Gregoriana - leading actor

== Discography ==
=== Studio albums ===
- 2002 - L'inesprimibile sogno di Giada (EP)
- 2006 - Le canzoni del mondo di Oz (LP)
- 2020 - Nomade digitale (LP)
- 2022 - Animanomalie (LP)
- 2024 - Superliminale (LP)

== Other websites ==
- Gianluca Testa - Official Website
- Testa
- Gianluca Testa, su Discogs
- Gianluca Testa, su Rockit
