= ROSSEM =

Belgium political party

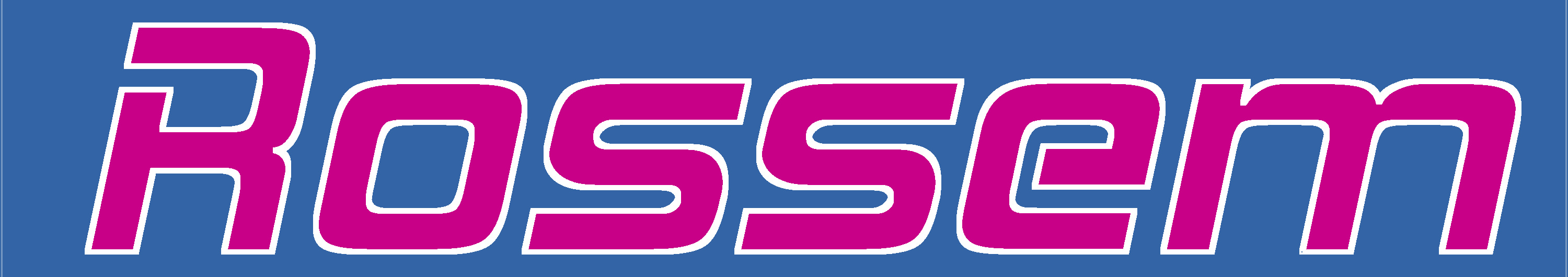
- President: Jean-Pierre Van Rossem (1991–1994, 2009–2013); Nora Azdad (2013–2014)
- Founded: 1991 / 2009
- Dissolved: 1994 / 2014
- Succeeded by: BANAAN, Blanc, WOW, HOERA (1995, unofficial successors); Anderz (2014, legal successor)
- Ideology: Radicalism; Anti-establishment; 2009–2014: Civil libertarianism; Animal welfare; Anti-imperialism; Civic nationalism; 1991–1995: Political satire; Libertarianism; Populism; Republicanism
- Political position: Big tent
- Colors: Purple

Website
- partijrossem.be

Radical Reformists and Social Fighters for a Fairer Society (Dutch: Radicale Omvormers en Sociale Strijders voor een Eerlijker Maatschappij, ROSSEM) was a Belgian libertarian political party founded in 1991 by the Flemish businessman and writer Jean-Pierre Van Rossem. There was an active French-speaking section in the Walloon Brabant with the acronym ROSSUM (Rassemblement omniprésent social et solidaire pour l'ubiquité des masses).

== History ==
=== 1991 Elections ===
The party participated in the 24 November 1991 elections for the Belgian national parliament. It scored surprisingly well for a non-mainstream party, achieving 3.2% of the vote which entitled it to three seats in the lower house and one in the senate.

Initially, Van Rossem could not take up his seat as he was arrested a few days before the elections following allegations of financial fraud. He was eventually sworn in on 7 January 1992. Another parliamentarian for ROSSEM was Jan Decorte, a Flemish stage actor and director, who broke with Van Rossem following the 1993 incident and continued as an independent.

=== Dissidences ===
In 1993 Van Rossem courted controversy by shouting "Vive la république d'Europe, vive Julien Lahaut!" during King Albert II's oath ceremony following his succession to the throne. Later that year, the party collapsed due to infighting amongst its members, and did not contest the next election. There were three dissidences. The first was Waardig Ouder Worden in 1993, which joined the Vlaams Blok in 1999, it was led by Hendrik Boonen and Paul Verledens. The second was HOERA in 1993 by Jan Decorte in relation to the internal division between republicans and monarchists.

The third one was Beter Alternatieven Nastreven Als Apathisch Nietsdoen in 1995 and was active until 1997 before joining Vivant. This dissidence, and its French-speaking section (BANANE) are generally considered as the successors of ROSSEM because Jean-Pierre Van Rossem gave them his support.

It is interesting to note that the anti-Van Rossem economically libertarian members of the party also grouped together in the Blanco list, led by Marcel Van der Vloet, that also participated in the 1995 elections. This was a populist list that insisted on voting "against all" by voting for them.

=== 1994 Local elections ===
In the 1994 Belgian local elections, Rossem managed to present lists in a few municipalities, but with mediocre results. In Meise, the party achieved 2.33%, its best result. In some municipalities in the province of Antwerp, the party exceeded 1%: Malle (1.78%), Zwijndrecht (1.71%) and Mechelen (1.29%) as well as in the municipality of Sint-Gillis-Waas (1.35%) in East Flanders. Finally, in the rest of the municipalities where Rossem was present, the party never exceeded 1%: Bruges (0.94%), Deinze (0.82%), Ghent (0.81%), Sint-Niklaas (0.75%), Antwerp (0.75%) and Wemmel (0.35%).

Finally, in Ninove, the party ran under the name of Banier and managed to obtain 11% (3 elected members), but in 2000 the result fell to 7% (1 elected member) before disappearing altogether.

Most of the party's local sections had joined WOW, which managed to obtain fairly decent results, between 0.5% and 5%, resulting in a handful of elected local councillors throughout Flanders and one provincial councillor in Antwerp.

=== After 1995 ===
In the 1995 elections, the different splits of ROSSEM participated in the elections. At the federal level, WOW made 0.84% while BANAAN made 0.66% and Blanco 0.04%. Both parties were present in all Flemish constituencies, Blanco was only present in the Brussels-Hal-Vilvoorde constituency. For the Senate, WOW made 0.89%, BANAAN 0.53% and HOERA 0.35%.

WOW had a program very close to that of the Vlaams Blok, Blanco was a populist big-tent party, while BANAAN and HOERA were satirical left-wing parties.

These different parties also participated in the Flemish regional election. WOW scored 1.4%, BANAAN 0.89% and HOERA 0.4%. All three parties were present in all constituencies. Finally, BANAAN participated in the regional election of Brussels-Capital in the French-speaking college (under the name BANANE) by making a result of 0.61%.

In 1999, BANANE (French-speaking section of BANAAN) still existed for the elections under the name of Tarte. WOW suffered a major electoral defeat that year leading to a merger with the Vlaams Blok alongside Blanco, BANAAN joined the new Vivant party and HOERA ceased to exist. By the mid-2000s, Vivant's Walloon branch vanished and their Flemish branch merged into the liberal Open Vld. Their German-speaking branch still holds as 2023 seats in the Parliament of the German-speaking Community.

=== ROSSEM 2 ===
In 2009, Jean-Pierre Van Rossem wanted to re-found his party under the name Partij van de Toekomst but the name ROSSEM remained because it was much more familiar. In 2012 ROSSEM announced his intention to take part in the Antwerp municipal elections. Van Rossem dropped this plan, however, because his party was not sufficiently prepared.

In 2013, Nora Azdad was elected President of ROSSEM. Van Rossem wanting to create the party program in the shadow. He also tried to create a joint list for the 2014 elections with the Workers' Party of Belgium and Libertair, Direct, Democratisch but they refused. Jean-Marie Dedecker (LDD) did not want to join forces with either Van Rossem or the PvDA, and Peter Mertens (PvDA) did not want to risk losing the possibility of getting a Flemish elected representative as predicted by the polls, but he did not totally reject the idea either.

In 2014, it suffered a heavy defeat in the Federal (0.17% at national level but 0.3% at Flemish level) and Flemish regional (0.24%) elections.

== Electoral results ==
The results given here are those of ROSSEM-ROSSUM (1991 and 2014) and BANAAN-BANANE (1995).

=== Chamber of Representatives ===
| Election | Votes | % | Seats | +/- | Government |
|---|---|---|---|---|---|
| 1991 | 199,194 | 3.24 | 3 / 212 | | Opposition |
| 1995 | 40,098 | 0.66 | 0 / 150 | ▼3 | Extra-parliamentary |
Did not run (1999–2010)
| 2014 | 11,680 | 0.17 | 0 / 150 | | Extra-parliamentary |

=== Senate ===
| Election | Votes | % | Seats | +/- | Government |
|---|---|---|---|---|---|
| 1991 | 197,128 | 3.22 | 1 / 106 | | Opposition |
| 1995 | 31,956 | 0.53 | 0 / 40 | ▼1 | Extra-parliamentary |

=== Regional ===
==== Brussels Parliament ====
| Election | Votes | % | Seats | +/- | Government |
|---|---|---|---|---|---|
| 1995 | 2,536 | 0.61 | 0 / 75 | | Extra-parliamentary |

==== Flemish Parliament ====
| Election | Votes | % | Seats | +/- | Government |
|---|---|---|---|---|---|
| 1991 | Indirectly elected | | 4 / 188 | | Opposition |
| 1995 | 33,701 | 0.89 | 0 / 124 | ▼4 | Extra-parliamentary |
Did not run (1999–2009)
| 2014 | 9,935 | 0.24 | 0 / 124 | | Extra-parliamentary |

=== Provinces ===
==== 1994 ====
| Province | % | Seats | Government |
|---|---|---|---|
| West-Vlaanderen | 0.25 | 0 / 84 | Extra-parliamentary |
| Oost-Vlaanderen | 0.23 | 0 / 83 | Extra-parliamentary |
| Antwerpen | 0.33 | 0 / 84 | Extra-parliamentary |
| Vlaams-Brabant | 0.29 | 0 / 75 | Extra-parliamentary |
