= Il commissario (TV series) =

- Country of origin: Italy
- No. of seasons: 1
- No. of episodes: 8

Original release
- Network: Canale 5
- Release: 2001 – 2002

Il commissario is an Italian crime television series.

== Cast ==
- Massimo Dapporto: Inspector Cruciani
- Caterina Vertova: Silvia Ruggeri
- Paolo Triestino: Franco Delillo
- Marco Vivio: Luca Cruciani
- Antonia Liskova: Francesca
- Andrea Tidona: Mimmo Calò
- Tomas Arana: "The American"
- Mattia Sbragia: Bruno Scilla
