= The Invisible Thread (film) =

- Italian: Il filo invisibile
- Directed by: Marco Simon Puccioni
- Written by: Luca De Bei; Marco Simon Puccioni
- Starring: Filippo Timi; Francesco Scianna; Francesco Gheghi
- Release date: 4 March 2022
- Running time: 103 minutes
- Country: Italy
- Language: Italian

The Invisible Thread (Italian: Il filo invisibile) is a 2022 Italian comedy-drama film directed by Marco Simon Puccioni, written by Luca De Bei and Marco Simon Puccioni and starring Filippo Timi, Francesco Scianna and Francesco Gheghi.

== Plot ==
The story is seen through the eyes of Leone, who is working on a school project about LGBT rights in Europe, based on none other than his own, personal experience. Whilst also in the throes of first love with his beautiful school friend Anna, Leone is forced to accept that his “beautiful family” isn’t quite as perfect as it seems. And so, caught between prejudiced views of homosexuality as hereditary, a raft of misunderstandings, civil battles, and various twists and turns, our young man – whose suffering is clear as day and is no different from that felt by any other youngster whose parents split up – finds himself thinking about the “invisible thread” which binds him to his two dads and to all those who brought him into the world.

== Cast ==
- Filippo Timi as Paolo Ferrari
- Francesco Scianna as Simone Lavia
- Francesco Gheghi as Leone Ferrari
- Giulia Maenza as Anna Del Monte
- Jodhi May as Tilly Nolan
- Valentina Cervi as Monica Ferrari
- Emanuele Maria Di Stefano as Jacopo Venosa
- Matteo Oscar Giuggioli as Dario Del Monte
- Mauro Conte as Riccardo Morselli
- Alessia Giuliani as Elisa Del Monte
- Gerald Tyler as Leroy Liotta
- Enrico Borello as Receptionist
- Gianluca De Marchi as Domenico Moretti

== Release ==
The film is available on Netflix.
