= Vanessa Chinitor =

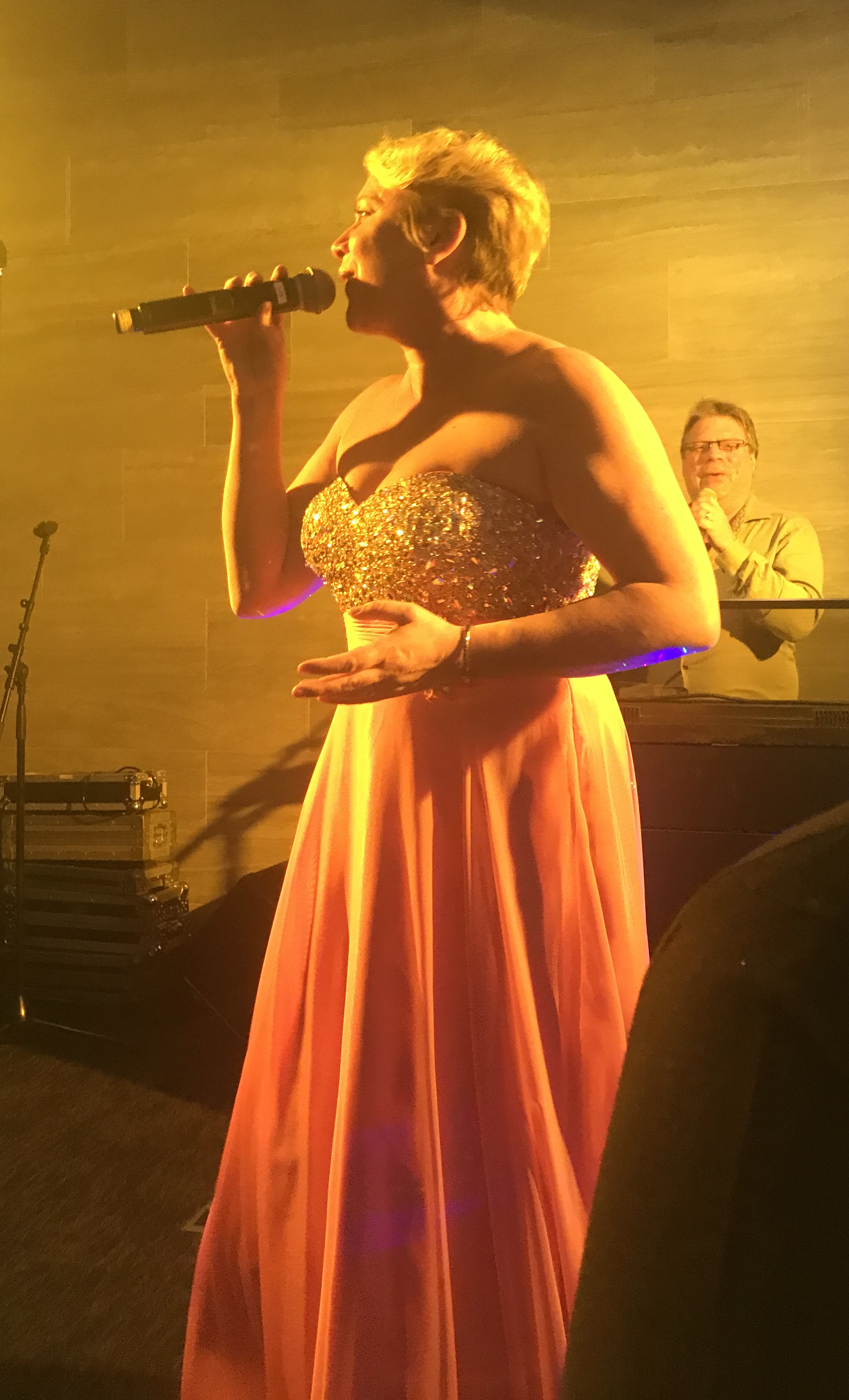

Background information
- Born: 13 October 1976 (age 49)
- Origin: Dendermonde, Belgium
- Genres: Pop
- Occupation: Singer
- Website: www.vanessachinitor.be

Vanessa Chinitor (born 13 October 1976, Dendermonde, East Flanders) is a Belgian singer, best known outside Belgium for her participation in the 1999 Eurovision Song Contest.

== Early career ==
In 1996, Chinitor was a finalist in the VTM talent show Ontdek de Ster Show (The Discover the Star Show). She released her first single, "In al mijn dromen", in 1998.

== Eurovision Song Contest ==
In 1999, Chinitor's song "Like the Wind" was chosen as the Belgian representative in the 44th Eurovision Song Contest, which took place on 29 May in Jerusalem. Chinitor was unfortunate to be drawn to sing second, the draw known to Eurovision fans as the 'no hoper' as no song performed second has ever won the contest. "Like the Wind" is a distinctive song with new-age influences, which could not match Belgium's relatively high placement in the 1998 contest but managed to finish in a respectable joint 12th place of 23 entries, having received 38 points, the same as the United Kingdom entry.

In 2006, Chinitor participated for a second time in the Belgian Eurovision selection, but her song "Beyond You" did not progress beyond the quarter-final stage.

== Later career ==
Chinitor released her first album, also titled Like the Wind, in 1999. This album was recorded entirely in English and included the single "When the Siren Calls", which was a moderate hit. Chinitor returned to recording in Dutch for the single "Verlangen", which reached the top 10 of the Ultratop Flemish chart. She also recorded a version of the song "Ik neem vandaag de trein", originally recorded by another Belgian Eurovision representative, Ann Christy.

In 2001 she released Costa Romantica, an album of duets with Bart Kaëll, from which three singles were released.

Chinitor has since worked in a number of musical shows on television and stage, often in collaboration with musician Dirk Bauters.

== Discography ==
=== Singles ===
- 1998: "In al mijn dromen"
- 1999: "Verdoofd en verblind"
- 1999: "Like the Wind"
- 1999: "When the Siren Calls"
- 1999: "Verlangen"
- 2000: "Deze dans"
- 2000: "Ik neem vandaag de trein"
- 2001: "Comme j'ai toujours" (duet with Bart Kaëll)
- 2001: "I’ve got you babe" (duet with Bart Kaëll)
- 2001: "Weer naar zee" (duet with Bart Kaëll)
- 2002: "Heimwee"
- 2004: "Je hart"

=== Albums ===
- 1999: Like the Wind
- 2001: Costa Romantica (with Bart Kaëll)

Preceded by Mélanie Cohl with "Dis oui"	Belgium in the Eurovision Song Contest; 1999	Succeeded by Nathalie Sorce with "Envie de vivre"
