= Steel (2012 film) =

- Film poster
- Italian: Acciaio
- Directed by: Stefano Mordini
- Written by: Silvia Avallone (story); Giulia Calenda; Stefano Mordini
- Starring: Michele Riondino; Vittoria Puccini; Matilde Giannini; Anna Bellezza
- Cinematography: Marco Onorato
- Edited by: Jacopo Quadri; Marco Spoletini
- Music by: Andrea Mariano
- Release date: September 3, 2012 (69th Venice International Film Festival)
- Running time: 95 minutes
- Country: Italy
- Language: Italian

Steel (Italian: Acciaio) is a 2012 Italian drama film directed by Stefano Mordini.

It is based on the 2010 novel Steel (Acciaio) by Silvia Avallone. The film is set in the industrial town of Piombino, Tuscany and focuses on a working class family involved in the Piombino steel plants' crisis. It premiered at the 69th Venice International Film Festival on 3 September 2012.

== Cast ==
- Michele Riondino as Alessio
- Vittoria Puccini as Elena
- Matilde Giannini as Anna
- Anna Bellezza as Francesca
- Francesco Turbanti as Mattia
- Luca Guastini as Cristiano
- Monica Brachini as Sandra
- Massimo Popolizio as Arturo
