= Big Brother VIPs (Belgian TV series) season 2 =

Big Brother VIPs
- Season 2
- No. of days: 10
- No. of housemates: 12
- Winner: Pim Symoens
- Runner-up: Jo Planckaert
- No. of episodes: 10

Release
- Original network: Kanaal Twee
- Original release: 12 October – 28 December 2006

Additional information
- Filming dates: August 2006 – September 2006

Season chronology
- ← Previous; Season 1

Big Brother VIPs 2 was the second celebrity spin-off season of the Belgian version of Big Brother aired in the Flemish Region of Belgium on Kanaal Twee.

The show took place over ten days from the end of August to the beginning of September 2006, the events were kept secret. Each of the ten days was shown in ten weekly episodes starting from 12 October 2006 to 28 December 2006. 12 VIP housemates entered the Big Brother house.

The highlight of the season was Petra, who voluntarily left the house less than an hour after she entered. This is the shortest stay by a housemate in Big Brother world history.

The winner of this season was Pim Symoens.

This celebrity season had a lower rating compared to the regular season. Some videos of the show went viral and were more successful on the internet than the broadcast episodes. Critics complained about the fame of some of the contestants. There was also criticism about the inclusion of Javier De Rycke who was ejected from the last regular season because of aggressive behavior.

== Format ==
In contrast with the regular season, the VIPs season was completely prerecorded.

Other differences with the regular season were that there were no weekly tasks but daily tasks. Every day there were two tasks. One task in the morning to decide the Big Boss of the day. The other task in the afternoon was to decide the household budget for the next day. If they succeeded in the task, housemates could order the same night for the next day. Failing the task, the housemates had an emergency ration the next day.

There were no public evictions. Each housemate would nominate two of their fellow housemates. The two (or more) housemates with the most nominations would be up for eviction. It was the Big Boss who decided who was evicted.

Big Boss had the same benefits of the regular season but had some more during the VIPs season:

- Same benefits: being able to use the luxury loft. The loft was always provided with enough food and drinks. Big Boss could choose one of the other housemates to stay in the loft. Big Boss was the responsible one for the shopping.
- Added benefits: Big Boss didn't have to participate in the household task. It was Big Boss only who evicted one of the nominated housemates.

The winner didn't receive a money prize, since all the celebrity housemates got paid 500 euro for every day in the house.

== Housemates ==
Name	Age on entry	Famous for...	Day entered	Day exited	Result
Pim Symoens	23	Singer & Star Academy 2005 contestant	1	10	Winner
Jo Planckaert	36	Cyclist	1	10	Runner-up
Cynthia Reekmans	24	Miss Belgian Beauty 2005	1	10	3rd Place
Ivan Heylen	60	Singer	1	9	Evicted
An Jaspers	27	Model	1	8	Evicted
Ingrid Berghmans	45	Sportswomen, Olympic gold medalist, Judo	1	7	Evicted
Vandana De Boeck	28	Actress	1	6	Evicted
Afi Oubaibra	27	Runner-up Star Academy 2005 & Singer	1	5	Evicted
David Davidse	51	Musical actor and vocal coach	1	4	Evicted
Tim De Pril	23	Contestant in Temptation Island 2003	1	3	Evicted
Javier De Rycke	33	Big Brother 5 housemate, ex-Singer and finalist of Mister Belgium	1	2	Evicted
Petra	34	Singer	1	1	Walked

== Daily summary ==
Day 1
Day 1	Entrances	Afi, An, Cynthia, David, Ingrid, Ivan, Javier, Jo, Petra, Pim, Tim and Vandana entered the house.
Day 1	Highlights	Petra and Javier were in a relationship together for over 2 years. When Petra saw that Javier was in the house she immediately wanted to leave. She said that she would not spend the night in the same house as Javier. The other housemates tried unsuccessfully to change her mind.
Day 1	Exits	Petra voluntarily left.
Day 1	Big Boss Task	The Housemates who could stay the longest inside a spinning tumble dryer. The winner Javier with 7m 26s, but this did not count as after Petra left the House the Eviction of that night was cancelled.
Day 1	Task	The household tasks were put in large ice cubes. Housemates had to get them out in less than 4 hours.
Day 2
Day 2	Big Boss Task	The Housemate who could sing the song "Hey lekker beest" from Isabelle A the loudest. Won by David with a recording of 111.7 decibels.
Day 2	Task	All housemates had to jump in jeans above the swimming pool and stay together for at least four minutes in the air.
Day 2	Highlights	David crushed his fingers during the Big Boss task and had to leave the house to get some fingers fixed.
Day 2	Nominations	David and Javier received the most votes.
Day 2	Exits	Big Boss David chose Javier to leave the house.
Day 3
Day 3	Big Boss Task	The winner of the competition was the Housemate who could knock the most skittles out of a cupboard. Pim knocked out the most with 10.
Day 3	Task	Big Boss Pim had to range the housemates according to fame.
Day 3	Nominations	Tim and Vandana received the most votes.
Day 3	Exits	Big Boss Pim chose Tim to leave the house.
Day 4
Day 4	Big Boss Task	The competition was a game of fast reactions. Jo and Pim made it through to the final with Jo winning.
Day 4	Task	The housemates had to stay in a cardboard tube with a caricature of themselves until Big Brother gave a signal.
Day 4	Highlights	David left the house to have an operation done on his fingers.
Day 4	Nominations	David, Jo and Vandana received the most votes.
Day 4	Exits	Big Boss Jo chose David to leave the house.
Day 5
Day 5	Big Boss Task	The Housemates had to perform a ski-run and ring the bell above the pool in the quickest time. An rang the bell in 1 minute 52 seconds and wins the competition.
Day 5	Task	The housemates were split into two groups. One group had to question the feasibility of the suggested task. The other group had to do it.
Day 5	Nominations	Afi, An and Vandana received the most votes.
Day 5	Exits	Big Boss An chose Afi to leave the house.
Day 6
Day 6	Big Boss Task	The Housemates had to take part in a Limbo Dancing competition. Cynthia was the winner.
Day 6	Task	Unknown
Day 6	Nominations	Cynthia and Vandana received the most votes.
Day 6	Exits	Big Boss Cynthia chose Vandana to leave the house.
Day 7
Day 7	Big Boss Task	The Housemates had to play bowls with pints of beer and Ingrid was the winner.
Day 7	Task	The housemates had to use their bodies to catch pies who are dropped. They had to save enough cherries. The task failed.
Day 7	Nominations	An and Igrid received the most votes.
Day 7	Exits	Big Boss Ingrid chose herself to leave the house.
Day 8
Day 8	Big Boss Task	The Housemates had a boxing competition with giant boxing gloves and Jo was the winner.
Day 8	Task	The housemates had to portray sayings. The task failed.
Day 8	Nominations	An, Jo and Pim received the most votes.
Day 8	Exits	Big Boss Jo chose An to leave the house.
Day 9
Day 9	Big Boss Task	The Housemates had to last the longest in a tub full of cold water and ice, and Ivan was the winner.
Day 9	Task	The housemates had to dig a tunnel of four meters in a large cube of styrofoam.
Day 9	Nominations	Cynthia and Ivan received the most votes.
Day 9	Exits	Big Boss Ivan chose himself to leave the house.
Day 10
Day 10	Tasks	Housemates had to last as long as possible in a dark "fear cage". Cynthia decided not to go into the cage at all and therefore lasted the shortest with 0 seconds. In the final competition, Jo and Pim had to answer questions on events from the show. Each time they got a question wrong they lost a point, the person that lost all their points would be the runner-up. Jo lost all his points and Pim still had 4 points left. Jo was dropped into the water and Pim was the winner.
Day 10	Exits	Cynthia left the house in third place. Jo left the house as runner-up. Pim left the house as the winner.

== Nominations table ==
	Day 1	Day 2	Day 3	Day 4	Day 5	Day 6	Day 7	Day 8	Day 9	Day 10 Final	
Pim	No; Nominations	Tim, Vandana	Tim	An, David	An, Vandana	Cynthia, Vandana	An, Ingrid	An, Cynthia	Cynthia, Ivan	Saved	Winner (Day 10)
Jo	No; Nominations	David, Javier	An, Vandana	David	Ivan, Vandana	Ivan, Vandana	An, Cynthia	An	Cynthia, Ivan	Saved	Runner up (Day 10)
Cynthia	No; Nominations	David, Tim	Ivan, Vandana	David, Jo	Afi, Pim	Vandana	Ingrid, Jo	Jo, Pim	Jo, Pim	Refused	Evicted (Day 10)
Ivan	No; Nominations	David, Javier	David, Pim	Jo, Pim	An, Jo	An, Cynthia	An, Cynthia	An, Jo	Ivan	Evicted (Day 9)	
An	No; Nominations	David, Javier	Afi, Tim	David, Ivan	Afi	Pim, Vandana	Ingrid, Ivan	Jo, Pim	Evicted (Day 8)		
Ingrid	No; Nominations	Cynthia, Vandana	David, Vandana	David, Vandana	Afi, Vandana	Pim, Vandana	Ingrid	Evicted (Day 7)			
Vandana	No; Nominations	Javier, Tim	David, Tim	Ingrid, Jo	Afi, Pim	Cynthia, Ivan	Evicted (Day 6)				
Afi	No; Nominations	David, Javier	Ingrid, Tim	An, Vandana	An, Vandana	Evicted (Day 5)					
David	No; Nominations	Javier	Cynthia, Tim	Cynthia, Vandana	Evicted (Day 4)						
Tim	No; Nominations	David, Pim	An, Vandana	Evicted (Day 3)							
Javier	Big; Boss	An, Vandana	Evicted (Day 2)								
Petra	No; Nominations	Walked (Day 1)									
Big Boss	Javier	David	Pim	Jo	An	Cynthia	Ingrid	Jo	Ivan	none	
Nominated	None	David, Javier	Tim, Vandana	David, Jo, Vandana	Afi, An, Vandana	Cynthia, Vandana	An, Ingrid	An, Jo, Pim	Cynthia, Ivan	Cynthia, Jo, Pim	Jo, Pim
Walked	Petra	none									
Evicted	Eviction; Cancelled	Javier; David's choice to evict	Tim; Pim's choice to evict	David; Jo's choice to evict	Afi; An's choice to evict	Vandana; Cynthia's choice to evict	Ingrid; Ingrid's choice to evict	An; Jo's choice to evict	Ivan; Ivan's choice to evict	Cynthia; 0 Seconds	Jo; 0 of 8 Points
Evicted	Eviction; Cancelled	Javier; David's choice to evict	Tim; Pim's choice to evict	David; Jo's choice to evict	Afi; An's choice to evict	Vandana; Cynthia's choice to evict	Ingrid; Ingrid's choice to evict	An; Jo's choice to evict	Ivan; Ivan's choice to evict	Cynthia; 0 Seconds	Pim; 4 of 8 Points
