= Missione di pace =

- Film poster
- Directed by: Francesco Lagi
- Written by: Umberto Contarello; Filippo Gravino; Francesco Lagi; Marco Pettenello
- Starring: Silvio Orlando; Francesco Brandi; Alba Rohrwacher; Bugo; Filippo Timi
- Cinematography: Arnaldo Catinari
- Music by: Bugo
- Release date: 9 September 2011 (Venice)
- Running time: 90 minutes
- Country: Italy
- Language: Italian

Missione di pace (lit. 'Peacekeeping mission') is a 2011 Italian black comedy film directed by Francesco Lagi. It was the closer film at the Critics' Week at the 68th Venice International Film Festival.

== Plot ==
Captain Vinciguerra, a veteran of the peacekeeping missions, is sent on a mission to Yugoslavia to capture a dangerous criminal on the run. However, the captain has an "enemy" in his family, Giacomo a pacifist, who will drive him crazy during his mission.

== Cast ==
- Silvio Orlando as Sandro Vinciguerra
- Alba Rohrwacher as Maria Pettariello
- Francesco Brandi as Giacomo Vinciguerra
- Filippo Timi as Che Guevara
- Bugo as Quinzio
- Antonella Attili as Teresa Vinciguerra

== See also ==
- List of Italian films of 2011
