= Anton Milenin =

Russian theatre actor and director (born 1969)

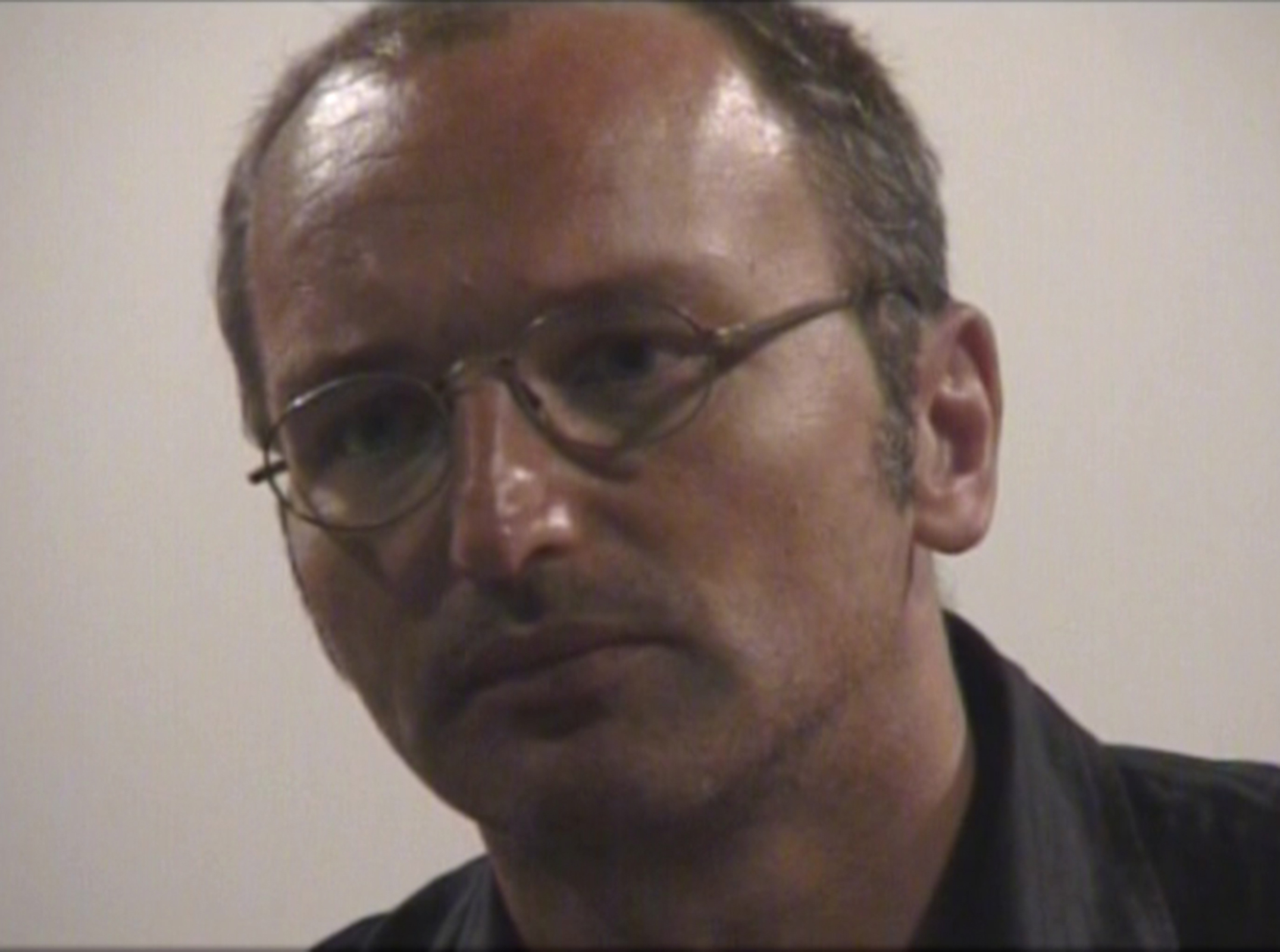
Anton Milenin

Anton Michailovič Milenin (Russian: Анто́н Миха́йлович Миле́нин; Moscow, April 7, 1969) is a Russian theatre actor, director and teacher who has worked in Italy and Russia for more than fifteen years, rector of Universal Academy of Hermeneutics.

== Biography ==
Born and raised in Moscow, Milenin started his theatrical studies at the Moscow Art Theatre (MXAT) with Alexander Kalyagin and Alla Pokrovskaja.

After three years, he abruptly changed his artistic path and joined the Russian Academy of Theatre Arts (GITIS) where he graduated twice: in 1991, as an actor, under the instruction of Boris Morozov and Iosif Rajchel'hauz; and in 1997, as a director, under the instruction of Vassilij Ivanic Skorik. rector of Anton Milenin. Rector of Universal Academy of Hermeneutics.

== Career ==
Milenin's acting debut was in 1991 at MXAT, playing with Innokenty Smoktunovsky, Stanislav Lyubshin and Victor Mirošničenko.

In 1995, he received first prize at the Lithuanian Festival in Daugavpils for his direction of Diderot's Jacques the Fatalist. In 1996, he staged at the Russian Academy of Theatre Arts (GITIS), under Sergej Isaiev's direction, The Cherry Orchard and Three Sisters by Anton Chekhov.

In 1997, he was invited to Europe, and worked on Dostoevsky's The Gambler at the AKT-ZENT Creative Center headed by Jurij Alschitz in Berlin.

The next year he participated at the École des Maîtres with Matthias Langhoff, directing Heart Piece by Heiner Müller. In 2001, as a visiting professor, he directed the graduating students of the School of Dramatic Arts Paolo Grassi in Milan, staging Romeo and Juliet by William Shakespeare.

With Giorgio Barberio Corsetti's Company, he collaborated in Fattore K and Progetto Cechov, directing Chekhov's Uncle Vanya and The Seagull at the Teatro Argentina in Rome. The production, in which the main character of Kostja Treplev was played by a young Filippo Timi at the beginning of his career, proved to be a turning-point experience for all actors involved.

He is among the artists invited at the Festival Santarcangelo dei Teatri and at the VolterraTeatro Festival, where he directs In the Solitude of Cotton Fields by Bernard-Marie Koltès, The Gamblers by Nikolai Gogol and conducts the masterclass All’uscita del teatro dopo la rappresentazione di una nuova commedia, also inspired by Gogol's work. His study of Koltès' plays continues in 2004 with Roberto Zucco staged in Rome at the Teatro Rialto Santambrogio and at Metateatro - Casa delle Culture and in Rennes at the Dromesko.

In 2005, he won the first prize at the Russian Festival of Young Dramaturgy in Tarusa directing K. Tcakhova's The Blu snake. In 2007, he is invited at the XIV International Actor Festival in Neaples where he mastered the workshop Recitare con il personaggio (Acting with the character) on Plato's Republic

Sapienza University of Rome and the Accademia Nazionale d'Arte Drammatica Silvio D'Amico (Silvio d'Amico National Academy of Dramatic Arts) invited Milenin and Nikolaj Skorik between 2006 and 2007 in the series of masterclasses and conferences about Konstantin Stanislavski and Vsevolod Meyerhold Le due ali del Gabbiano (the two wings of the Seagull) Returning to Russia in 2008, he worked at the School of Dramatic Art, founded and directed by Anatoly Vasiliev, leading an acting masterclass on Tarkovsky's films Stalker and Nostalghia.

In the same year, he is the founder of Kostja Treplev Theatre, currently based in Naples. The company has staged under his artistic direction Thus Spoke Oscar Wilde and Napolitica, from Oscar Wilde's The Young King, The Happy Prince and other tales; Zed - Philosophy with the Whip, from Nietzsche's, Plato's, Berdyaev's, Theophanes's and others' theories on the nature of love; a new production of Koltès' s Roberto Zucco.
