= The Scent of Blood =

2004 film directed by Mario Martone

- Directed by: Mario Martone
- Written by: Mario Martone
- Based on: a novel by Goffredo Parise
- Starring: Fanny Ardant; Michele Placido
- Cinematography: Cesare Accetta
- Edited by: Jacopo Quadri
- Release date: 2004
- Country: Italy
- Language: Italian

The Scent of Blood (Italian: L'odore del sangue, also known as The Smell of Blood) is a 2004 Italian thriller-drama film written and directed by Mario Martone. It was screened at the 2004 Cannes Film Festival in the Director's Fortnight section. It is based on a novel by Goffredo Parise.

== Cast ==
- Fanny Ardant: Silvia
- Michele Placido: Carlo
- Giovanna Giuliani: Lù
- Sergio Tramonti: Sergio
- Riccardo Scamarcio
- Francesco Scianna

== Production ==
Towards the beginning of this film there is a unsimulated scene of oral sex, set in the dark room of a nightclub and played by two extras. But rumors talked of about half an hour of cut sequences, also explicit, in which some of the leading actors would be involved.

== See also ==
- List of Italian films of 2004
