= The Man of Glass =

- Directed by: Stefano Incerti
- Written by: Salvatore Parlagreco; Heidrun Schleef
- Cinematography: Pasquale Mari
- Edited by: Cecilia Zanuso
- Music by: Andrea Guerra
- Release date: 2007
- Language: Italian

The Man of Glass (Italian: L'uomo di vetro) is a 2007 Italian crime drama film directed by Stefano Incerti.

It is based on real life events of the first Sicilian Mafia's "pentito", Leonardo Vitale.

== Cast ==
- David Coco as Leonardo "Leuccio" Vitale
- Tony Sperandeo as The Uncle
- Anna Bonaiuto as The Mother
- Ninni Bruschetta as Police Commissioner Bruno Contrada
- Francesco Scianna as Salvatore
