= Antonia Liskova =

Slovak-Italian actress

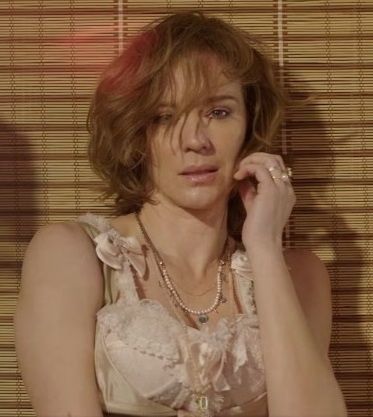
- Liskova in Déluge (2023)
- Born: Antónia Lišková; 25 March 1977 (age 49); Bojnice, Czechoslovakia
- Other name: Bjela
- Occupation: Actress
- Years active: 1993; 2000–present
- Spouse: Luca Ferrarese (2004–present)
- Website: antonialiskova.com

Antonia Liskova (born 25 March 1977) is a Slovak-Italian actress.

== Career ==
Liskova lived in Slovakia until her 17th birthday. After she graduated in pharmacology and medicinal chemistry, her father offered her a trip to Italy, where she worked as waitress in a small bar in Rome after starting a modeling career in Milan.

Later she returned to Rome and started to work as an actress.

== Personal life ==
In 2010 Antonia married the plastic surgeon Luca Ferrarese. The couple has a daughter.

== Filmography ==
=== Films ===
Year	Title	Role(s)	Notes
2000	A Chinese in a Coma	Melanie	
2001	Gioco con la morte	Alina	
2002	Il piacere di piacere	Daniela	
2004	Promessa d'amore	Carola	
2007	Riparo	Mara	
2009	Giulia Doesn't Date at Night	Eva	
2010	The Santa Claus Gang	Veronica	
2013	Cam Girl	Alice	
2014	A Woman as a Friend	Antonia	
2018	Sconnessi	Olga	
2018	Parlami di Lucy	Nicole	
2019	A Tor Bella Monaca non piove mai	Samantha	
2021	Addio al nubilato	Eleonora	
2023	Terezín	Klára Engelová	

=== Television ===
Year	Title	Role(s)	Notes
2001	Don Matteo	Maryla	Episode: "Un uomo onesto"
2001	Via Zanardi 33	Anneke	Main role
2002	Il commissario	Francesca	Main role
2003	La notte di Pasquino	Jenny	Television film
2003–04	Incantesimo	Dr. Laura Gellini	Main role (season 6)
2003–05	Sospetti	Yrina Fischer	Main role (season 2–3)
2004	Il tunnel della libertà	Hellen	Television film
2005	Il Cuore nel Pozzo	Anja	Television film
2005	L'uomo sbagliato	Erika Schneider	Television film
2006	I figli strappati	Fey von Hassel	Television film
2007	Caccia segreta	Beatrice	Television film
2008	Inspector Montalbano	Elena Sclafani	Episode: "La luna di carta"
2008	Zodiaco	Ester Musso	Main role
2009	Il bene e il male	Mariella Fioretti	Main role
2009	Le segretarie del sesto	Miranda	Television film
2009	Occhio a quei due	Carla	Television film
2010–12	Tutti pazzi per amore	Laura Del Fiore	Main role (seasons 2–3)
2012	Mai per amore	Livia	Episode: "Troppo amore"
2012	Mary of Nazareth	Herodias	Television film
2015–17	Solo per amore	Elena Ferrante	Lead role
2017	Thou Shalt Not Kill	Giada Pinto	Episode: "Episodio 5"
2018–20	Carlo & Malik	Micaela Carta	Main role (seasons 1–2)
2019	Purché finisca bene	Sara	Episode: "Bastano un paio di baffi"
2019	La porta rossa	Silvia Pes	Recurring role (season 2)
2020	L'allieva	Andrea Manes	Main role (season 3)
2023	Il patriarca	Serena Bandera	Main role
