= Belgium in the Eurovision Song Contest 1999 =

- Eurovision Song Contest 1999
- Participating broadcaster: Vlaamse Radio- en Televisieomroeporganisatie (VRT)
- Country: Belgium
- Selection process: Eurosong '99
- Selection date: 28 February 1999

Competing entry
- Song: "Like the Wind"
- Artist: Vanessa Chinitor
- Songwriters: Ilia Beyers; John Terra; Emma Philippa Hjälmås; Wim Claes

Placement
- Final result: 12th, 38 points

Participation chronology

Belgium was represented at the Eurovision Song Contest 1999 with the song "Like the Wind", written by Ilia Beyers, John Terra, Emma Philippa-Hjälmås and Wim Claes, and performed by Vanessa Chinitor. The Belgian participating broadcaster, Flemish Vlaamse Radio- en Televisieomroeporganisatie (VRT), selected its entry for the contest through the national final Eurosong '99. The competition featured twenty-five competing entries and consisted of three shows. In the final on 28 February 1999, "Like the Wind" performed by Vanessa Chinitor was selected as the winner via the votes of three televoting groups and two jury groups.

Belgium competed in the Eurovision Song Contest which took place on 29 May 1999. Performing during the show in position 2, Belgium placed twelfth out of the 23 participating countries, scoring 38 points.

== Background ==
Prior to the 1999 contest, Belgium had participated in the Eurovision Song Contest forty-one times since its debut as one of seven countries to take part in 1956. Since then, they have won the contest on one occasion in 1986 with the song "J'aime la vie", performed by Sandra Kim. In 1998, "Dis oui" performed by Mélanie Cohl placed sixth.

The Belgian participation in the contest alternates between two broadcasters: Flemish Vlaamse Radio- en Televisieomroeporganisatie (VRT) and Walloon Radio-télévision belge de la Communauté française (RTBF) at the time, with both broadcasters sharing the broadcasting rights. Both broadcasters –and their predecessors– had selected the Belgian entry using national finals and internal selections in the past. VRT had the turn to participate in 1999. Both RTBF in 1998 and VRT's predecessor BRTN in 1996 organised a national final in order to select the Belgian entry. VRT held the Eurosong national final to select its entry for the 1999 contest.

== Before Eurovision ==
=== Eurosong '99 ===
Eurosong '99 was the national final organised by VRT to selecte its entry in the Eurovision Song Contest 1999. The competition consisted of four shows that commenced on 7 February 1999 and concluded with a final on 28 February 1999 where the winning song and artist were selected. All shows took place at the Studio 100 in Schelle, hosted by Bart Peeters and were broadcast on TV1.

==== Format ====
Twenty-five entries were selected to compete in Eurosong, of which 21 competed in three semi-finals that took place on 7, 14 and 21 February 1999 with each show featuring seven entries. The winner of each semi-final qualified to the final and the highest scoring second placed act in the semi-finals was also selected to advance. The final took place on 28 February 1999 where the four semi-final qualifiers were joined by the remaining four entries that were automatically qualified for the final and the winner was chosen. The results of all shows were determined by an expert jury, an international jury consisting of 40 European expats living in Belgium from countries that participate in Eurovision, and public televoting on Radio 2, Radio Donna and TV1. Each voting group had an equal stake in the result. Televoting on Radio 2 and Radio Donna was held for a week prior to each of the five shows after the songs were presented on their radio shows; 'Met Twee' and 'Schrappen wat niet past' respectively; while televoting on TV1 was held during the show. Each show was split into two parts: in the first part, the songs were performed and the results of the expert jury were announced; after the first part an episode of Heterdaad was aired while the rest of the results were being collected; and in the second part, the results of the international jury and three televoting groups were announced.

During each of the five shows, the expert jury provided commentary and feedback to the artists and selected entries to advance in the competition. These experts were:

- Liliane Saint-Pierre – singer, represented Belgium in 1987
- Anja Daems – Radio 2 presenter
- Marcel Vanthilt – singer and television presenter
- Marc Coenegracht – journalist for Het Laatste Nieuws
- Koen Lauwereyns – journalist for Het Volk
- Steve Stevens – journalist for TV Expres

==== Competing entries ====
A submission period was opened on 1 November 1998 for artists and songwriters to submit their entries until 15 December 1998. Twenty-one entries were selected from 199 received during the submission period, while VRT also directly invited four composers to each submit a song which would directly qualify for the final: Marc Paelinck, Marc Vanhie, Miguel Wiels and Stefan Wuyts. The twenty-five acts selected for the competition were announced on 12 January 1999.

Artist	Song	Songwriter(s)	Selection
Alana Dante	"Get Ready for the Sunsand"	Peter Neefs	Open submission
Belle Perez	"Hello World"	Maribel Pérez, Patrick Renier, Jim Soulier	Open submission
Bjorn and Joeri	"Je doet wat je doet"	Johan de Backer	Open submission
Davy Gilles	"Waar ben jij"	Davy Gilles	Open submission
Dominic	"Tonight Is the Night"	Phil Francins, Luc Smets	Open submission
Fé	"Love Me"	A. Larson, Alain Vande Putte, Filip Martens	Open submission
Frank Galan	"Dame tu vida"	Luigi Bongiovani, Alexander Pascal, Christille Verstraete, Frank Galan	Open submission
K3	"Heyah Mama!"	Miguel Wiels, Alain Vande Putte, Peter Gillis	Open submission
Laurena	"Diamond in Heaven"	Peter Keereman	Open submission
Margriet Hermans	"Ik vaar met je mee"	Margriet Hermans, Luigi Bongiovani	Open submission
Martine Foubert	"Come to Me"	Marc Paelinck	Open submission
Matadi	"Wo-Y-Yè"	Jacky De Munck	Open submission
Matiz	"Negentien"	Marc Corrijn, Koen de Beir	Open submission
Medusa	"Into My Life"	Stefan Wuyts	Invited by VRT
Nadia	"I'm in Heaven"	Mike Egan, Paul Vermeulen, Lou Roman	Open submission
Natural High	"Finally"	Marc Paelinck	Invited by VRT
Petra	"Diep in mijn huid"	Miguel Wiels, Alain Vande Putte, Peter Gillis	Invited by VRT
Piece of Cake	"Do It Again"	Collin Pildidch, Luc Smets	Open submission
Ricky Fleming	"Door jou"	Patrick Feustel, Wim Claes	Open submission
Sarah	"He's the One"	Mark Vanhie	Invited by VRT
Splinter	"Als schepen verwelken"	Hedwig Demesmaeker, Frank Truyen	Open submission
Vanessa Chinitor	"Like the Wind"	Ilia Beyers, John Terra, Emma Philippa-Hjälmås, Wim Claes	Open submission
Voice Male	"This Is My Life"	Marc Paelinck	Open submission
Wendy Fierce	"Never Give Up"	Fonny Dewulf	Open submission
Yves Segers	"Recht vooruit"	Yves Segers	Open submission

==== Semi-finals ====
The four semi-finals took place on 7, 14 and 21 February 1999. In each show seven entries competed and the combination of results from three televoting groups and two jury groups determined the winner that qualified to the final. The highest scoring second placed act in the semi-finals, "This Is My Life" performed by Voice Male, also proceeded to the final.

Semi-final 1 – 7 February 1999
R/O	Artist	Song	Jury	Televote	Total	Place
1	Splinter	"Als schepen verwelken"	12	6	18	5
2	Fé	"Love Me"	6	21	27	2
3	Piece of Cake	"Do It Again"	6	7	13	6
4	Belle Perez	"Hello World"	12	15	27	2
5	Matadi	"Wo-Y-Yè"	4	7	11	7
6	Vanessa Chinitor	"Like the Wind"	18	18	36	1
7	Margriet Hermans	"Ik vaar met je mee"	4	19	23	4

Detailed Jury Votes
R/O	Song	Expert	International	Total
1	"Als schepen verwelken"	7	5	12
2	"Love Me"	4	2	6
3	"Do It Again"	2	4	6
4	"Hello World"	5	7	12
5	"Wo-Y-Yè"	3	1	4
6	"Like the Wind"	9	9	18
7	"Ik vaar met je mee"	1	3	4

Detailed Televoting Results
R/O	Song	Radio 2	Donna	TV1	Total
1	"Als schepen verwelken"	1	1	4	6
2	"Love Me"	9	9	3	21
3	"Do It Again"	2	3	2	7
4	"Hello World"	3	5	7	15
5	"Wo-Y-Yè"	4	2	1	7
6	"Like the Wind"	5	4	9	18
7	"Ik vaar met je mee"	7	7	5	19

Semi-final 2 – 14 February 1999
R/O	Artist	Song	Jury	Televote	Total	Place
1	Bjorn and Joeri	"Je doet wat je doet"	6	8	14	6
2	Laurena	"Diamond in Heaven"	7	10	17	4
3	Matiz	"Negentien"	10	9	19	3
4	Voice Male	"This Is My Life"	11	21	32	2
5	Davy Gilles	"Waar ben jij"	6	7	13	7
6	Wendy Fierce	"Never Give Up"	18	27	45	1
7	Frank Galan	"Dame tu vida"	4	11	15	5

Detailed Jury Votes
R/O	Song	Expert	International	Total
1	"Je doet wat je doet"	5	1	6
2	"Diamond in Heaven"	3	4	7
3	"Negentien"	7	3	10
4	"This Is My Life"	4	7	11
5	"Waar ben jij"	1	5	6
6	"Never Give Up"	9	9	18
7	"Dame tu vida"	2	2	4

Detailed Televoting Results
R/O	Song	Radio 2	Donna	TV1	Total
1	"Je doet wat je doet"	2	3	3	8
2	"Diamond in Heaven"	4	4	2	10
3	"Negentien"	3	2	4	9
4	"This Is My Life"	7	7	7	21
5	"Waar ben jij"	5	1	1	7
6	"Never Give Up"	9	9	9	27
7	"Dame tu vida"	1	5	5	11

Semi-final 3 – 21 February 1999
R/O	Artist	Song	Jury	Televote	Total	Place
1	Martine Foubert	"Come to Me"	18	12	30	2
2	Yves Segers	"Recht vooruit"	5	10	15	6
3	Alana Dante	"Get Ready for the Sunsand"	9	23	32	1
4	Nadia	"I'm in Heaven"	11	12	23	4
5	Ricky Fleming	"Door jou"	3	9	12	7
6	Dominic	"Tonight Is the Night"	12	13	25	3
7	K3	"Heyah Mama!"	4	14	18	5

Detailed Jury Votes
R/O	Song	Expert	International	Total
1	"Come to Me"	9	9	18
2	"Recht vooruit"	3	2	5
3	"Get Ready for the Sunsand"	5	4	9
4	"I'm in Heaven"	4	7	11
5	"Door jou"	2	1	3
6	"Tonight Is the Night"	7	5	12
7	"Heyah Mama!"	1	3	4

Detailed Televoting Results
R/O	Song	Radio 2	Donna	TV1	Total
1	"Come to Me"	1	2	9	12
2	"Recht vooruit"	7	1	2	10
3	"Get Ready for the Sunsand"	9	9	5	23
4	"I'm in Heaven"	2	3	7	12
5	"Door jou"	3	5	1	9
6	"Tonight Is the Night"	5	4	4	13
7	"Heyah Mama!"	4	7	3	14

==== Final ====
The final took place on 28 February 1999 where the four entries that qualified from the preceding three semi-finals and the four pre-qualified entries competed. The winner, "Like the Wind" performed by Vanessa Chinitor, was selected by the combination of results from three televoting groups and two jury groups. "Like the Wind" received over 100,000 of the 242,000 registered televotes.

Final – 28 February 1999
R/O	Artist	Song	Jury	Televote	Total	Place
1	Wendy Fierce	"Never Give Up"	9	22	31	2
2	Natural High	"Finally"	5	8	13	7
3	Voice Male	"This Is My Life"	8	16	24	5
4	Medusa	"Into My Life"	2	6	8	8
5	Alana Dante	"Get Ready for the Sunsand"	13	17	30	3
6	Petra	"Diep in mijn huid"	9	7	16	6
7	Vanessa Chinitor	"Like the Wind"	20	26	46	1
8	Sarah	"He's the One"	12	15	27	4

Detailed Jury Votes
R/O	Song	Expert	International	Total
1	"Never Give Up"	4	5	9
2	"Finally"	3	2	5
3	"This Is My Life"	2	6	8
4	"Into My Life"	1	1	2
5	"Get Ready for the Sunsand"	5	8	13
6	"Diep in mijn huid"	6	3	9
7	"Like the Wind"	10	10	20
8	"He's the One"	8	4	12

Detailed Televoting Results
R/O	Song	Radio 2	Donna	TV1	Total
1	"Never Give Up"	10	6	6	22
2	"Finally"	4	2	2	8
3	"This Is My Life"	2	10	4	16
4	"Into My Life"	1	4	1	6
5	"Get Ready for the Sunsand"	6	3	8	17
6	"Diep in mijn huid"	3	1	3	7
7	"Like the Wind"	8	8	10	26
8	"He's the One"	5	5	5	15

==== Ratings ====
Viewing figures by show
Show	Date	Viewers	Ref.
Semi-final 1 (Part 1)	7 February 1999	985,800	
Semi-final 1 (Part 2)	7 February 1999	—N/a	
Semi-final 2 (Part 1)	14 February 1999	1,062,700	
Semi-final 2 (Part 2)	14 February 1999	1,090,200	
Semi-final 3 (Part 1)	21 February 1999	1,150,400	
Semi-final 3 (Part 2)	21 February 1999	1,131,700	
Final (Part 1)	28 February 1999	1,347,300	
Final (Part 2)	28 February 1999	1,577,500	

== At Eurovision ==
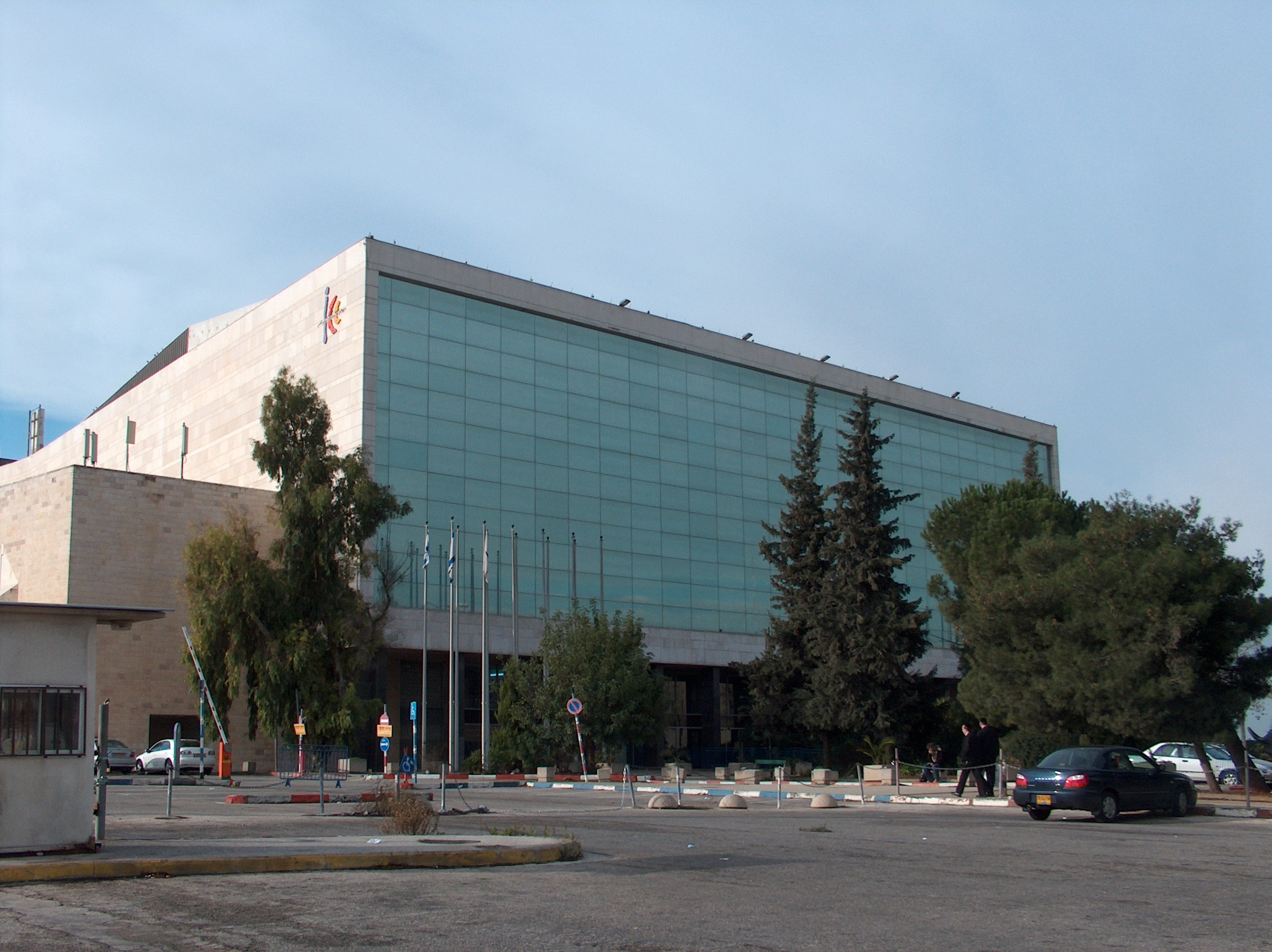
The Eurovision Song Contest 1999 took place at the International Convention Center in Jerusalem, Israel, on 29 May 1999.

The Eurovision Song Contest 1999 took place at the International Convention Center in Jerusalem, Israel, on 29 May 1999. According to the Eurovision rules, the 23-country participant list for the contest was composed of: the previous year's winning country and host nation, the seventeen countries which had obtained the highest average points total over the preceding five contests, and any eligible countries which did not compete in the 1998 contest. On 17 November 1998, an allocation draw was held which determined the running order and Belgium was set to perform in position 2, following the entry from Lithuania and before the entry from Spain. Belgium finished in twelfth place with 38 points.

The contest was broadcast in Belgium by both the Flemish and Walloon broadcasters. VRT broadcast the show on TV1 with commentary in Dutch by André Vermeulen and Bart Peeters; the broadcast reached 1.399 million viewers with a marker share of 69%. RTBF televised the shows on La Une with commentary in French by Jean-Pierre Hautier. VRT appointed Sabine De Vos as its spokesperson to announce the results of the Belgian televote during the final.

=== Voting ===
Below is a breakdown of points awarded to Belgium and awarded by Belgium in the contest. The nation awarded its 12 points to the Netherlands in the contest.

Points awarded to Belgium
Score	Country
12 points	
10 points	Ireland; Netherlands
8 points	
7 points	
6 points	
5 points	Estonia; Israel
4 points	Croatia
3 points	
2 points	France; Poland
1 point	

Points awarded by Belgium
Score	Country
12 points	Netherlands
10 points	Germany
8 points	Iceland
7 points	Sweden
6 points	Austria
5 points	Croatia
4 points	Estonia
3 points	Israel
2 points	Slovenia
1 point	Bosnia and Herzegovina
