= Alana Dante =

Belgian singer

- Born: Christel Hoogewijs; 1 December 1969 (age 56); Belgium
- Occupation: singer

Alana Dante (real name Christel Hoogewijs, born 1 December 1969) is a Belgium-born singer. Early in her life she went to a music academy to study violin and receive singing lessons. She would perform regularly at karaoke bars and clubs in Belgium before professional success.

Alana started her professional career in 1997 with a dance version of Celine Dion's song "Think Twice".

Her big breakthrough was with her 1998 hit "Take me for a ride". Her next single "The Life of the Party" became an even bigger hit. In 1999 Dante won the third semifinal of the Belgian selections for the Eurovision Song Contest with the single "Get ready for the Sunsand".

== Albums ==
- 1997: Breaking Out
- 1998: Disco Suppa Girl

== Singles ==
- 1996: "Think Twice"
- 1997: "Attention to Me"
- 1997: "Back Where We Belong"
- 1997: "Take Me for a Ride"
- 1998: "The Life of the Party"
- 1998: "Disco-Suppa-Girl"
- 1999: "Land of Eternal Love"
- 1999: "Get Ready for the Sunsand" – "Vakantie"
- 1999: "Saturday Baby"
- 1999: "Give You Up"
- 2000: "Star For a Night"
- 2000: "Back in the Summer"
- 2001: "Never Can Say Goodbye"
- 2005: "Disco"
