= Like the Wind (film) =

2013 biographical film

- Film poster
- Italian: Come il vento
- Directed by: Marco Simon Puccioni
- Produced by: Andrea Iervolino
- Starring: Valeria Golino; Filippo Timi
- Cinematography: Gherardo Gossi
- Music by: Shigeru Umebayashi
- Release date: 10 November 2013 (RFF)
- Running time: 110 minutes
- Country: Italy
- Language: Italian

Like the Wind (Italian: Come il vento) is a 2013 Italian biographical film directed by Marco Simon Puccioni. The film narrates the story of Armida Miserere, the first woman to direct a high security jail in Italy.

== Cast ==
- Valeria Golino – Armida Miserere
- Filippo Timi – Umberto Mormile
- Francesco Scianna – Riccardo Rauso
- Chiara Caselli – Rita Rauso
- Marcello Mazzarella – Maresciallo Stefano Prati
- Salvio Simeoli – Maresciallo Antonio Mangi
- Giorgia Sinicorni – Isabella
- Vanni Bramati – Maurizio
