= Marcello Mazzarella =

Italian actor

- Born: 18 October 1963 (age 62); Erice, Italy
- Occupation: Actor
- Years active: 1990-present

Marcello Mazzarella (born 18 October 1963) is an Italian actor. He appeared in more than sixty films since 1990.

== Selected filmography ==
Key
†	Denotes films that have not yet been released

Year	Title	Role	Notes
1999	Time Regained	Marcel Proust	
2000	I Prefer the Sound of the Sea	Vincenzo	
2000	Placido Rizzotto	Placido Rizzotto	
2000	Christie Malry's Own Double-Entry	Luca Pacioli	
2005	Melissa P.	Chiunque	
2007	Night Bus	Sandro	
2008	The Sicilian Girl	Don Michele	
2009	Fort Apache Napoli	Sicilians' Emissary	
2010	School Is Over	Michele	
2013	Like the Wind	Maresciallo Prati	
2014	Viktor	Martelli	
2022	My Name Is Vendetta	Vituzzo	
2022	A Breath of Fresh Air	Notaio Rosario	
2024	Eternal Visionary	Luigi Almirante	
2025	Duse	Mariano Fortuny	
