= Francesco Scianna =

Italian actor (born 1982)

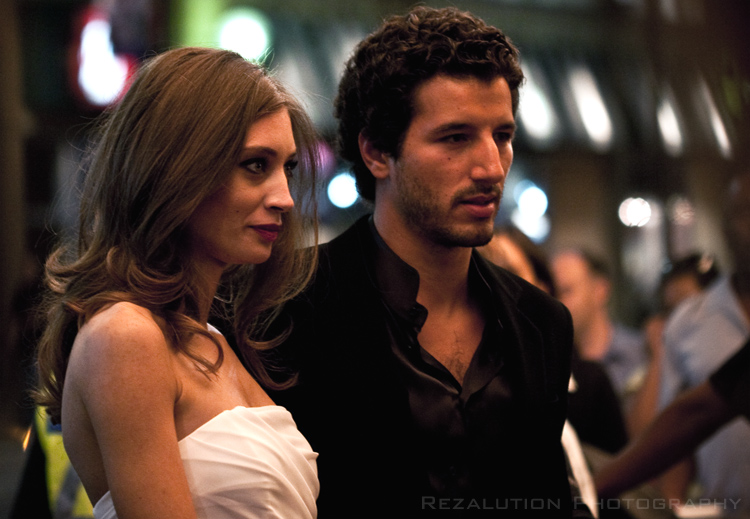
- Margareth Madè (left) and Scianna (right) at the opening of Baaria, Toronto International Film Festival 2009.
- Born: 25 March 1982 (age 44); Palermo, Italy
- Years active: 2002–present

Francesco Scianna (born 25 March 1982 in Palermo, Italy) is an Italian actor.

== Biography ==
=== Early education and career ===
Francesco Scianna began his acting career in theater, debuting in 1997 with the recital of poems by Salvatore Quasimodo, "CEI". Later he participated in many other works and graduated from the National Academy of Dramatic Art Silvio D'Amico.

He debuted in the movie Il più bel giorno della mia vita (2002), directed by Cristina Comencini, followed by L'odore del sangue, (2004), directed by Mario Martone. In 2007, he acted in the movie L'uomo di vetro.

After these films he performed on television, in La luna e il lago and Il Capo dei Capi.

=== Major roles ===
His big break came in 2009 when he played the role of Peppino Torrenuova, the male protagonist in Baarìa, directed by Giuseppe Tornatore, next to newcomer Margareth Madè. The film succeeded at the box office and was nominated by Italy as its entry in the Oscars 2010 and also nominated for a Golden Globe.

In 2010 Scianna acted in the movie Vallanzasca - Gli angeli del male, playing the role of Francis Turatello, with Kim Rossi Stuart, directed by Michele Placido. Also that year, he acted in Le cose che restano and in 2011 in Ti amo troppo per dirtelo.

== Filmography ==
=== Films ===
| Year | Title | Role | Notes |
|---|---|---|---|
| 2002 | The Best Day of My Life | Marco | |
| 2004 | The Scent of Blood | Francesco | |
| 2006 | The Wedding Director | Bodyguard | Cameo appearance |
| 2007 | The Man of Glass | Salvatore | |
| 2009 | Baarìa | Peppino Torrenuova | |
| 2010 | Angel of Evil | Francis Turatello | |
| 2011 | The Entrepreneur | Ferrero | |
| 2011 | Itaker - Vietato agli italiani | Benito | |
| 2013 | Like the Wind | Riccardo Rauso | |
| 2014 | Milionari | Marcello Cavani | |
| 2014 | Fasten Your Seatbelts | Giorgio | |
| 2015 | Latin Lover | Saverio Crispo | |
| 2015 | Another South | Roberto | |
| 2015 | I calcianti | Marco | |
| 2015 | The Price of Desire | Jean Badovici | |
| 2016 | Ben-Hur | Kadeem | |
| 2018 | Mady Magdalene | Exorcist | Cameo appearance |
| 2019 | Beware the Gorilla | Alfonso | |
| 2022 | The Invisible Thread | Simone Lavia | |

=== Television ===
| Year | Title | Role | Notes |
|---|---|---|---|
| 2005 | R.I.S. - Delitti imperfetti | Marco Nunzi | Episode: "Una sfida per il capitano" |
| 2006 | La luna e il lago | Saro | Television film |
| 2007 | Il Capo dei Capi | Luchino Bagarella | Episode: "1988–1993" |
| 2008 | Ho sposato uno sbirro | Francesco | Episode: "Pericolosamente" |
| 2010 | Le cose che restano | Cataldo | 3 episodes |
| 2013 | Altri tempi | Amedeo | Television film |
| 2016–2018 | The Mafia Kills Only in Summer | Massimo Melfi | Main role; 24 episodes |
| 2017 | Maltese: Il romanzo del commissario | Mauro Licata | Main role; 4 episodes |
| 2019 | La stagione della caccia - C'era una volta Vigata | Fofò La Matina | Television film |
| 2019 | The Trial | Ruggero Barone | Main role; 8 episodes |
