= Silvia Avallone =

Italian novelist and poet

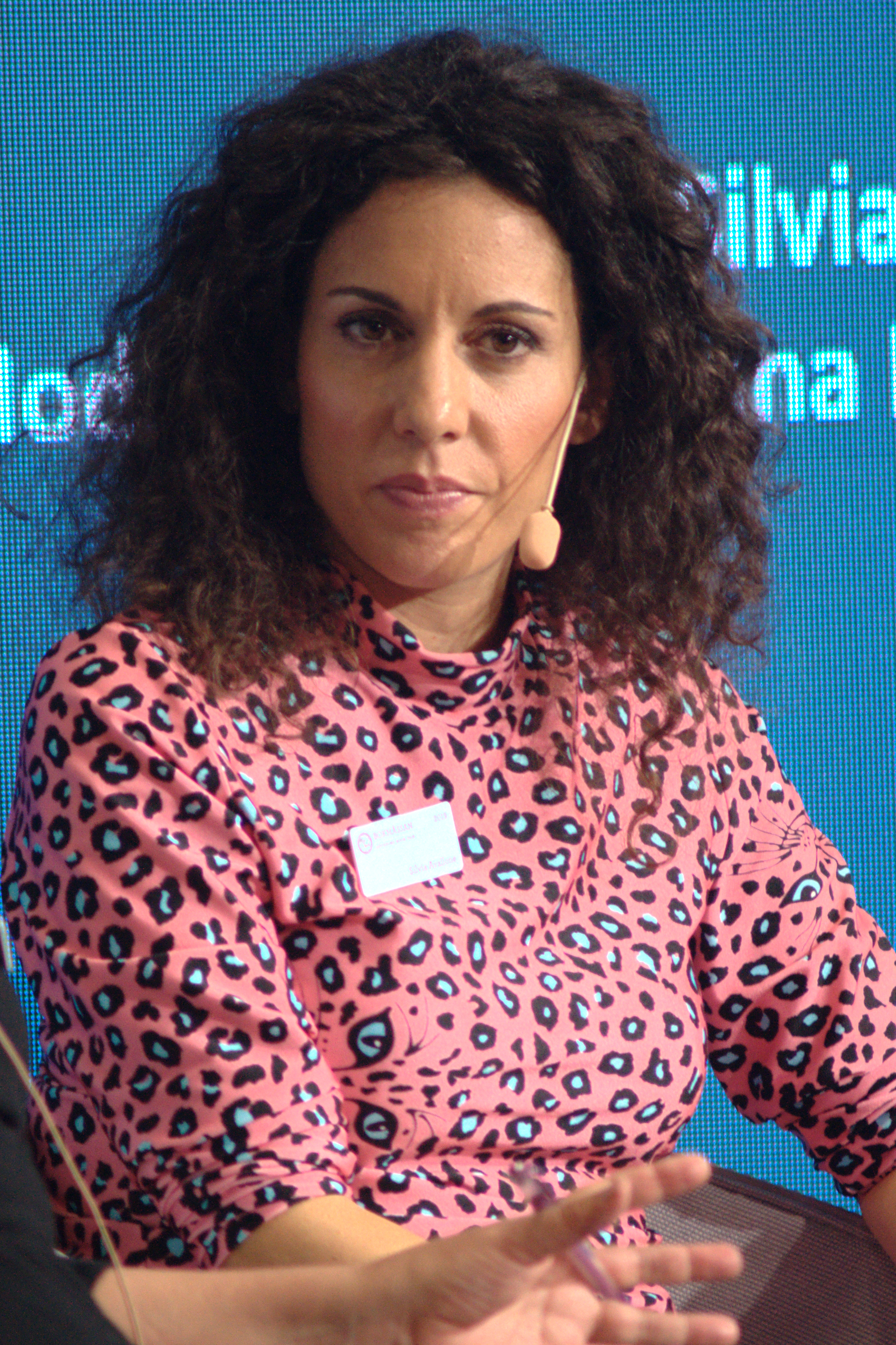
Silvia Avallone in 2019

Silvia Avallone (born 11 April 1984) is an Italian novelist and poet. Her first novel, Acciaio (2010; published in English as Swimming to Elba) won the Premio Campiello and was a finalist for the Strega Prize. It was adapted to a film of the same name by Stefano Mordini, and into a song and a play. She has published two more novels, and also writes short stories and poetry.

== Early life ==
Born in 1984 in Biella, she spent her adolescence in Piombino. She was an only child of divorced parents; her father owned a small business and her mother was a schoolteacher. She studied philosophy and literature in Bologna, and later married a bookseller. She lives in Bologna.

== Literary career ==
Her first collection of poetry, Il libro dei vent'anni, appeared in 2007. She also wrote short stories, which were published in literary magazines. Her first novel, Acciaio, was published in 2010 by RCS MediaGroup. Set in a steel mill in Piombino, it draws heavily on her childhood experiences. The book sold 350,000 copies and was translated into several languages. It was published in English as Swimming to Elba. It won the Premio Campiello and was a finalist for the Strega Prize. In 2012 it was adapted into a film of the same name by Stefano Mordini. It has also been adapted in to a song, included on the album Made in London by Noemi, and a play. Avallone writes for Corriere della Sera, La Lettura and 7.

Avallone's second novel, Marina Bellezza, was published in 2013. In 2018 she published her third novel, Da dove la vita è perfetta (The Perfect Life), narrating the interwoven histories of two Italian women confronted with the question of motherhood.

== Works ==
- 2007: Il libro dei vent'anni (poetry)
- 2010: Acciaio (English translation, Swimming to Elba)
- 2011: La lince
- 2013: Marina Bellezza
- 2018: Da dove la vita è perfetta
- 2020: Un'amicizia
- 2024: Cuore nero
