= Filippo Timi =

Italian actor, director and writer

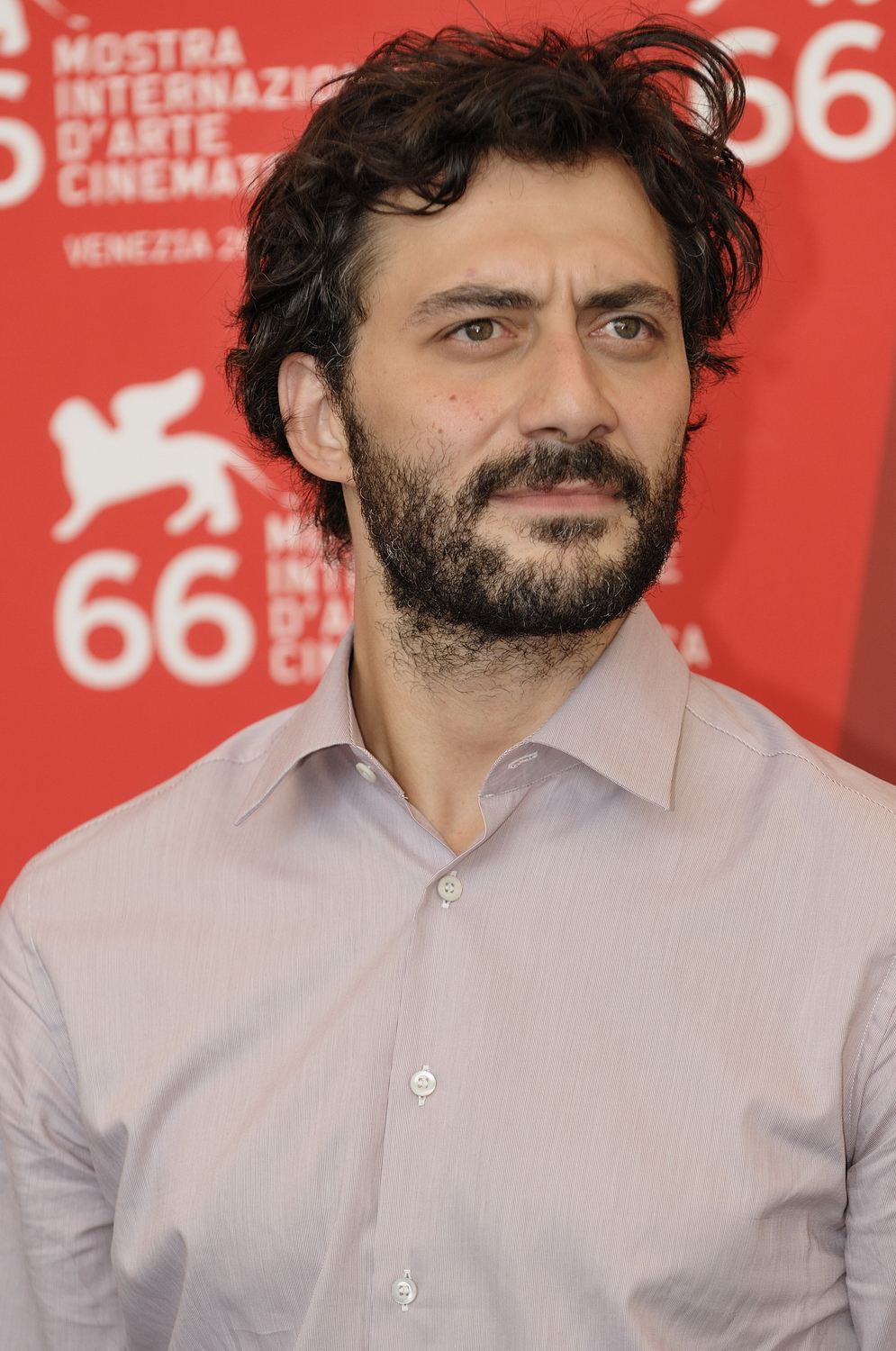
- Timi at the 2009 Venice Film Festival
- Born: 27 February 1974 (age 52); Perugia, Umbria, Italy
- Occupations: Actor; director; screenwriter; playwright; costumist
- Years active: 1999–present
- Spouse: Sebastiano Mauri (m. 2016; div. 2021)

Filippo Timi (born 27 February 1974) is an Italian actor, director and writer.

== Biography ==
=== Acting career ===
Filippo Timi was born in Perugia and studied acting in Bologna.

Filippo Timi was discovered as a film actor by the prominent Italian underground director Tonino De Bernardi. Timi debuted in De Bernardi's 1999 movie Appassionata, which was selected for the Venice Film Festival. After Appassionata he played in De Bernardi's Rosatigre (2000) and Farelavita (2001), both of which became classics of Italian underground cinema.

Despite his stutter and partial blindness, he has become a star of the big screen thanks to his wide range of activities as an author and entrepreneur for television, film, theater, magazines, and music shows. On stage he has been Orpheus, Danton, Perceval, Cupid, Hamlet and Satan. He has performed three different roles in Henrik Ibsen's A Doll's House directed by Andrée Ruth Shammah in 2016.

Timi made his debut as a theater director in 2009, directing a Shakespeare adaptation of Amleto². Timi has also played the lead role. Tickets for the play sold out two years in advance. The play cemented Timi's reputation as one of the most recognized and talented writers of contemporary Italian theater. In 2025, the play returned to the stage of the Teatro Nazionale di Genova.

His film career continued with roles in Ferzan Ozpetek's multiple award winning Saturn in Opposition and Saverio Costanzo's In Memory of Me, for which he was nominated for the Italian Syndicate of Film Journalists Award for Best Supporting Actor. He later starred in Wilma Labate's Miss F, and played in Giuliano Montaldo's The Demons of St. Petersberg alongside Isabella Rossellini. At the 2009 Moscow International Film Festival, Timi won the Best Actor award for his role in Gabriele Salvatores's As God Commands.

Since 2009 Timi's films have been selected to compete in major festivals. He played the young Benito Mussolini in Vincere by Marco Bellocchio, the only Italian film in competition at the 2009 Cannes Film Festival. Timi played the lead role in Giuseppe Capotondi's debut The Double Hour, which premiered at the Venice International Film Festival. He has performed in both dramatic (Vallanzasca, Angel of Evil, Rust (2011)) and comedic roles (Asterix and Obelix: God Save Britannia).

Timi had his English-language debut acting alongside George Clooney in Anton Corbijn's action film The American. He has also dubbed Tom Hardy's voice in the Italian release of The Dark Knight Rises, and voiced Manny in the Italian dub of the last two films of the Ice Age franchise, replacing Leo Gullotta.

Since 2013, he has played the lead role in the Italian TV series Murders at Barlume.

Staged in 2011, his surreal black comedy Favola immediately became a cult play. After many successful seasons, in 2018 Sebastiano Mauri directed a movie based on this production. Favola's sequel, Mrs. Fairytale - Non si torna indietro dalla felicità, premiered in 2021.

=== Writing career ===
In 2006, Timi published his debut novel Tuttalpiù muoio, co-written with Edoardo Albinati. It is a partially autobiographical coming-of-age story that was a great success with critics and the public. It was followed by E lasciamole cadere queste stelle, a collection of short stories dedicated to female characters. His third book, Peggio che diventare famoso, was published in 2008. The book followed the filming of As God Commands, a 2008 drama directed by Gabriele Salvatores. In the trilogy, Timi recalls his humble origins and through a vividly ironic and phantasmagorical lens, shows how he managed to transform youthful problems into a powerful and intense love of life.

In 2023, he published "Marilyn", a novel, a novel dedicated to one of Hollywood's most famous blondes. In Timi's book, she survives a suicide attempt and escapes to Rome.

== Personal life ==
Timi is openly gay. In 2016, he married his longtime boyfriend, the artist and writer Sebastiano Mauri, in a civil ceremony in New York City. By 2022, they were already divorced.

== Filmography ==
=== Films ===
Year	Title	Role	Notes
1999	In the Beginning There Was Underwear	Tasca	Feature film debut
1999	Appassionate	Ricky	
2000	Rosatigre	Antonello "Rosatigre"	Also screenwriter and costumer
2000	Atomique. Les trois portes	None	Director
2001	500!	Nico	
2001	Fare la vita	Antonello "Rosatigre"	Also screenwriter and composer
2001	Esile rosa tu	None	Director
2002	Open My Heart	Customer	
2002	L'altra donna	Filippo	
2005	Onde	Alex	
2006	L'eredità di Caino	Him	
2007	In memoria di me	Zanna	
2007	Saturn in Opposition	Roberto	
2007	Signorina Effe	Sergio	
2008	The Demons of St. Petersberg	Gusiev	
2008	As God Commands	Rino Zena	
2009	Vincere	Benito Mussolini	
2009	The Double Hour	Guido	
2010	The American	Fabio	
2010	The Solitude of Prime Numbers	Clown	Cameo appearance
2010	Angel of Evil	Enzo	
2011	When the Night	Manfred Sane	
2011	Ruggine	Doctor Boldrini	
2011	Missione di pace	Che Guerava	
2011	Piazza Garibaldi	Himself	Documentary film
2012	Love Is in the Air	Max Lamberti	
2012	Ice Age: Continental Drift	Manny (voice)	Italian voice-over role
2012	Asterix and Obelix: God Save Britannia	Décurion patrouille	
2013	A Castle in Italy	Ludovic Rossi-Levi	
2013	Like the Wind	Umberto Mormile	
2014	I corpi estranei	Antonio	
2015	Blood of My Blood	The Madman	
2015	He Named Me Malala	The voice of Malala's father	Italian dub; documentary film
2016	Icaros: A Vision	Pasajero Leonardo	
2016	Questi giorni	Mr. Mariani	
2016	Ice Age: Collision Course	Manny (voice)	Italian voice-over role
2017	Favola	Mrs. Fairytale	Also screenwriter
2022	The Invisible Thread	Paolo	
2022	The Eight Mountains	Giovanni Guasti	
2022	Robbing Mussolini	Achille Borsalino	
2026	Se domani non torno	Gino Cecchettin	

=== Television ===
Year	Title	Role	Notes
2010	Boris	Bruno Staffa	Episode: "La qualità non basta"
2013–present	Murders at Barlume	Massimo Viviani	Lead role
2014–2015	Il candidato	Piero Zucca	Lead role

== Selected plays ==
• Fuoco centrale, by Cesare Ronconi (1995) • G.A. story, by Robert Wilson (1996) • La rabbia, study by Pippo Delbono (1996) • Medea, by Filippo Timi e Federica Santoro; produced by Giorgio Barberio Corsetti (1999) • F. di O., by Filippo Timi, produced by Giorgio Barberio Corsetti (1999) • La tempesta, by Giorgio Barberio Corsetti (1999) • Il Graal, by Giorgio Barberio Corsetti (2000) • Woyzeck, by Giorgio Barberio Corsetti (2001) • Il gabbiano, by Anton Milenin (2001) • La morte di Danton, by Aleksandr Popowski (2004) • La vita bestia, by Giorgio Barberio Corsetti (2006) • Il colore bianco, by Giorgio Barberio Corsetti (2006) • Il popolo non ha il pane? Diamogli le brioche, by Filippo Timi (2009) • Favola. C'era una volta una bambina, e dico c'era perché ora non c'è più, by Filippo Timi (2011) • Giuliett'e Romeo. M'engolfi 'l core, amore, by Filippo Timi (2011) • Il Don Giovanni: vivere è un abuso, mai un diritto, by Filippo Timi (2013) • Skianto, by Filippo Timi (2014) • Una casa di bambola, by Andrée Ruth Shammah, (2015–16)
