= Jean-Pierre Van Rossem =

Belgian economist, politician and fraudster (1945–2018)

Jean Pierre Van Rossem
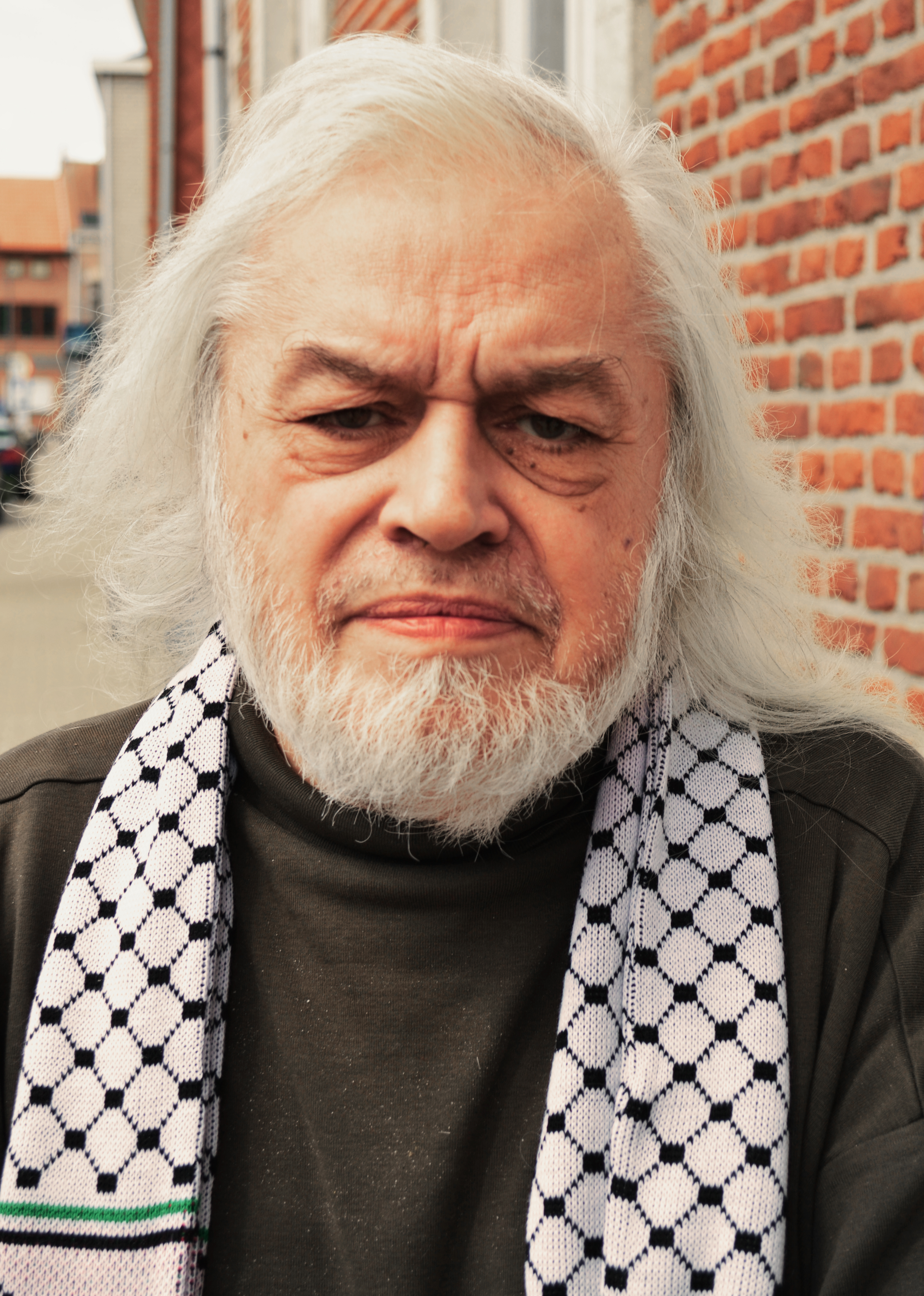

Belgian Chamber of Representatives
- In office 1991 – 1995

Member of the Flemish Parliament
- In office 1992 – 1995

Personal details
- Born: 29 May 1945 Bruges, Belgium
- Died: 13 December 2018 (aged 73)
- Party: ROSSEM
- Children: 2
- Education: Ghent University, Wharton School of the University of Pennsylvania
- Occupation: Stock market guru, economist, econometrician, author, philosopher, public figure, politician and former member of the Belgian & Flemish Parliament
- Awards: The International Scholarship of Flanders-prize
- Website: www.jeanpierrevanrossem.com

Jean-Pierre Van Rossem (29 May 1945 – 13 December 2018) was a Belgian economist, econometrician, activist, author, philosopher, stock-market guru, politician, and member of the Belgian and Flemish Parliaments.

== Life and career ==
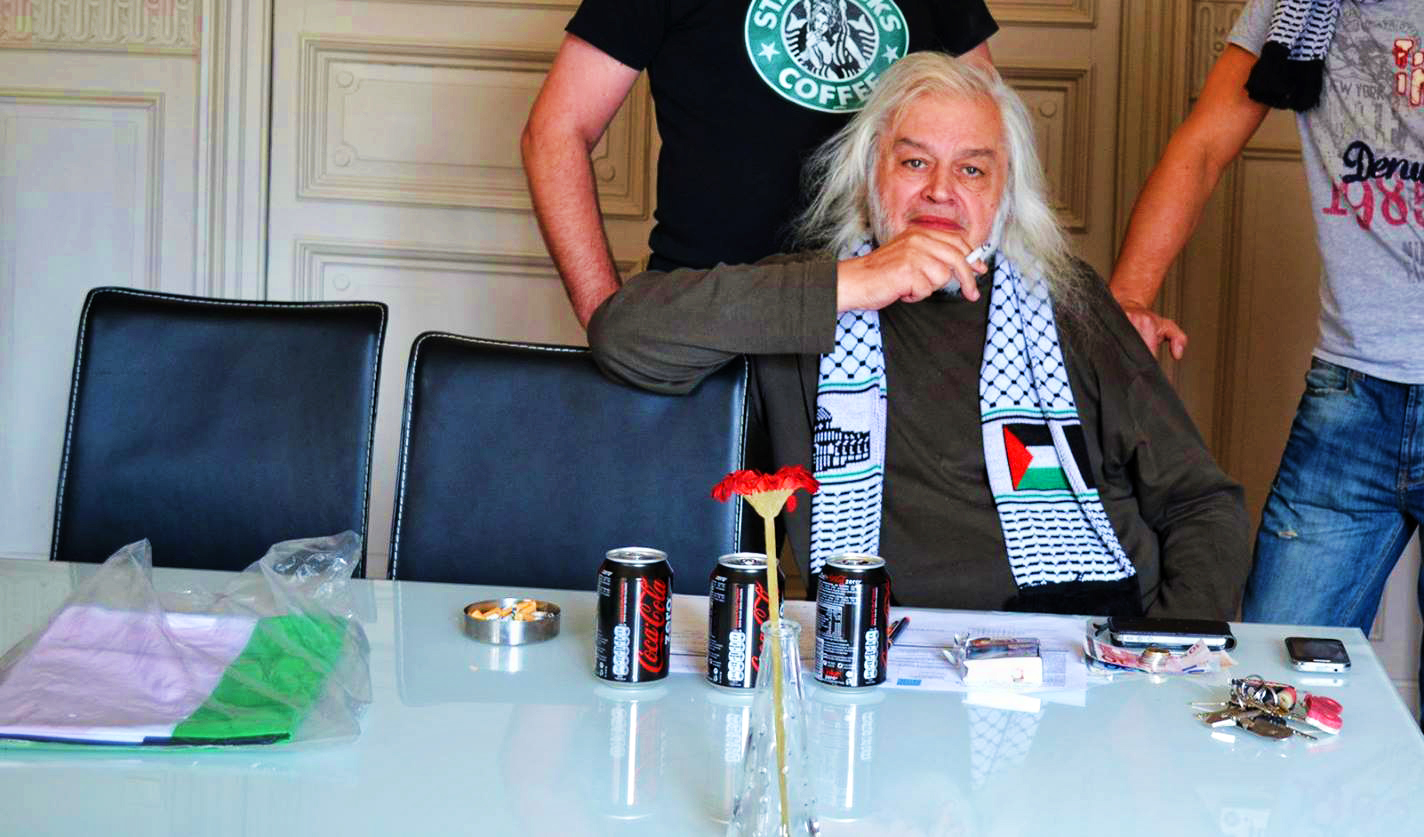
Jean-Pierre Van Rossem in 2014

Van Rossem studied economics at the Ghent University in 1963–67. With his final term paper De omloopsnelheid van het geld : theoretische begripsbenadering en praktische toepassing in België (English: The velocity of money: Theoretical approach to understanding and practical applications in Belgium) he won the International Scholarship of Flanders-prize and was able to study two years of econometrics under Nobel Prize winner Lawrence Klein at the Wharton School of the University of Pennsylvania.

=== Moneytron controversy and conviction for fraud ===
Van Rossem became famous as a stock market guru with Moneytron, an investment company that could offer apparently endless returns. His customers included the moneyed of Europe, including the Belgian royal family.

Van Rossem also claimed that he had developed a model that could predict the stock market and beat the capitalist system. He invested for the very wealthy and accumulated 860 million dollars for himself. At his most successful, Van Rossem owned a yacht, The Destiny, 108 Ferraris and two Falcon 900 aircraft. Later everything was sold to pay debts. He also printed false shares.

In 1991, he was sentenced to five years in prison for fraud; according to him, it was "a way to fuck the system." In prison, he wrote a personal diary, Gevangenisdagboek (English: Prison Diary), which was later published.

=== Formula One ===
Van Rossem sponsored and later became the majority owner of a Formula One team in 1989, Moneytron Onyx, which placed 10th of the 21 teams. The biggest success he achieved with his team was third place at the 1989 Portuguese Grand Prix with driver Stefan Johansson. The team signed an agreement with Porsche to use the V12 that Footwork then went on to use. However the deal was cancelled when Van Rossem announced the deal on Belgian television prior to the initial announcement. That night he made the news again, as he'd driven his Porsche to town square and set fire to it.

=== ROSSEM ===
In 1991, Van Rossem founded his own libertarian protest party ROSSEM, according to many, to gain political immunity, because of his problems with the Belgian courts. The name of the party stood for ‘Radicale Omvormers en Sociale Strijders voor een Eerlijker Maatschappij’ ('Radical Reformers and Social Warriors for a Fairer Society'). Under the slogans ‘Geen gezwijn, stem libertijn’ ('No nonsense, vote libertine') & 'Geen gezeik iedereen Rijk' ('No whining, everybody rich'), ROSSEM got 3.2% of the votes, or 3 seats in the Belgian Federal Parliament in the Parliamentary elections of 24 November 1991. Rossem himself had a seat in the Belgian Chamber of Representatives from November 1991 to May 1995 and the Flemish Parliament from January 1992 to May 1995.

In 2014 he went back to the elections with his party ROSSEM but lost with only 0.3% of the votes for the Belgian Federal Parliament and 0.2% for the Flemish Parliament.

== Controversies ==
- At the swearing-in ceremony of King Albert II before both houses of Parliament in 1993, he shouted "Vive la république d'Europe, vive Julien Lahaut!" (English: "Long live the republic of Europe, long live Julien Lahaut!"), a reference to communist leader Julien Lahaut, who had shouted "Vive la république!" in 1950 when King Baudouin took the oath, and was assassinated a week later.
- In 2004, Van Rossem was a guest on the Dutch television show Het Grote Complot – De Wereld Verklaard and offended the Dutch prime minister Jan Peter Balkenende by calling him a "dick".

== In popular culture ==
Jean-Pierre Van Rossem had cameo roles in the comics series The Adventures of Nero by Marc Sleen, more specifically the albums Nerorock and De Man van Europa. Around the same time he was also featured in his own celebrity comics series, scripted by himself and drawn by Erik Meynen.

== Other information ==
- Van Rossem claimed to have met Osama bin Laden in 1988 at the Bahrain Middle East Bank in Saudi Arabia.
- In 2002 the politician Wim Verreycken compared ROSSEM, along with the murder of Dutch politician Pim Fortuyn, as political stunts during a meeting of the Belgian Senate.
- Slot Car Racing and JP Van Rossem: Van Rossem put an extraordinary amount of time into slot car racing, including hosting major races in Europe and the United States, where he covered all costs of flying top-rated racers to his races. He bought a raceway in Chicago where he put on races called "The Worlds" in 1988 and 1989. Thousands of dollars were given in prizes, including two Pontiac Fieros.

== Bibliography ==
- Hoe genezen we onze zieke ekonomie? (1979, Metodika)
- Moneytron: How the system works (1989)
- Is Outperformance of Security Markets Possible with Modern Econometrics? (1990)
- Staat in staat van ontbinding (1990, Houtekiet)
- Proces in duplo (1990, Houtekiet)
- Mister Junkie & Sister Morphine (1991, Houtekiet)
- Sonate voor een blauwe vuurtoren (1991, Houtekiet)
- Libertijns Manifest (1991)
- Libertijnse Breekpunten: wat willen Libertijnen (1992)
- Een dode zwaan in Tann (1992)
- De schat van de Arme Klavers (1992, Loempia)
- Hoe word ik stinkend rijk?: Van Rossems beleggings – en belastinggids editie 1993 (1992)
- Wie vermoordde André Cools? (1993, Loempia)
- Hoe kom ik van de grond? : Van Rossems Sex – en Bordelengids (1993)
- De nacht van Christus-Koning (1996)
- Gevangenisdagboek (1999, Van Halewyck)
- De dag van de nachtschade (2000, Van Halewyck)
- Brigitte, of Het hart van de engel (2001)
- De maquette : verslag (2002)
- De onkuise kuisheid van de Boccaccio : studie van het postmoderne nachtleven (2002)
- Crisis: Hoe lossen we het op? (2009, Lampedaire)
- De engel in de duivel (2009, Lampedaire)
- Belgisch uranium voor de eerste Amerikaanse en Russische atoombommen (2011, Van Halewyck)

== Literature ==
- Martine Vanden Driessche, L'Anversois – Jean-Pierre Van Rossem (Marabout, Alleur 1990). With the paragraph (p. 40) describing how he disturbed the lectures of Professor M.A.G. Van Meerhaeghe.

== Selected filmography ==
Television
Year	Title	Role
1990	Klasgenoten (mini series)	Himself
1990	Wie ben ik (Talkshow)	Himself
2001	"Big Brother VIPS" (mini series)	Himself
2004	"Het grote complot – De wereld verklaard" (mini docu series)	Himself
2009	"Phara" (Talk Show)	Himself
2009	"Phara" (Talk Show)	Himself
2009	"Villa Vanthilt" (Talk Show)	Himself
2009	"Phara" (Talk Show)	Himself
2011	"Reyers Laat" (Talk Show)	Himself
2011	"Pauw & Witteman" (Talk Show)	Himself
2012	"Cafe Corsari" (Talk Show)	Himself
2016	"De Ideale Wereld" (Talk Show)	Himself
