= Annecy Italian Film Festival =

- Location: Annecy, France
- Language: Italian
- Website: http://www.annecycinemaitalien.com

The Annecy Italian Film Festival (French: Festival du Cinéma Italien d'Annecy), founded in 1983, shows Italian cinema. The private festival is held annually (usually in October) at the Centre Culturel de Bonlieu, in the town of Annecy, in central France.
