= List of French films of 1997 =

A list of films produced in France in 1997.

Title	Director	Cast	Genre	Notes
100% Arabica	Mahmoud Zemmouri	Khaled, Cheb Mami	Comedy	1 nomination
Assassin(s)	Mathieu Kassovitz			Entered into the 1997 Cannes Film Festival
The Banned Woman	Philippe Harel			Entered into the 1997 Cannes Film Festival
Bet	Didier Bourdon, Bernard Campan	Didier Bourdon, Bernard Campan		
The Chambermaid on the Titanic	Bigas Luna	Romane Bohringer, Olivier Martinez	Period drama	
Le Bossu	Philippe de Broca	Daniel Auteuil, Fabrice Luchini	Swashbuckler	
Dakan	Mohamed Camara		Drama	1 win
The Fifth Element	Luc Besson	Bruce Willis, Milla Jovovich	Sci-Fi adventure	7 wins & 16 nominations
Genealogies of a Crime	Raúl Ruiz			Entered into the 47th Berlin International Film Festival
Kings for a Day	François Velle			Entered into the 20th Moscow International Film Festival
Lolita	Adrian Lyne	Jeremy Irons, Melanie Griffith, Frank Langella, Dominique Swain	Drama	French-American co-production
Lucie Aubrac	Claude Berri			Entered into the 47th Berlin International Film Festival
On connaît la chanson	Alain Resnais	Jean-Pierre Bacri, Agnès Jaoui	Musical comedy	9 wins & 8 nominations
Port Djema	Eric Heumann			Heumann won the Silver Bear for Best Director at Berlin
Post Coitum, Animal Triste	Brigitte Roüan	Brigitte Roüan	Drama	1 win & 2 nominations, screened at Cannes
Quadrille	Valérie Lemercier	André Dussollier, Sandrine Kiberlain	Comedy	
See the Sea	François Ozon	Sasha Hails, Marina de Van	Drama	
The Serpent's Kiss	Philippe Rousselot	Ewan McGregor, Greta Scacchi	Drama	1 nomination
Sous les pieds des femmes	Rachida Krim	Claudia Cardinale, Nadia Farès, Mohammad Bakri	Drama	
La Vérité si je mens !	Thomas Gilou	Bruno Solo, Richard Anconina, Vincent Elbaz, Gilbert Melki, José Garcia, Élie Kakou, Amira Casar	Comedy	
Western	Manuel Poirier	Sergi López, Sacha Bourdo		Entered into the 1997 Cannes Film Festival
