= Amanda Plummer =

American-Canadian actress (born 1957)

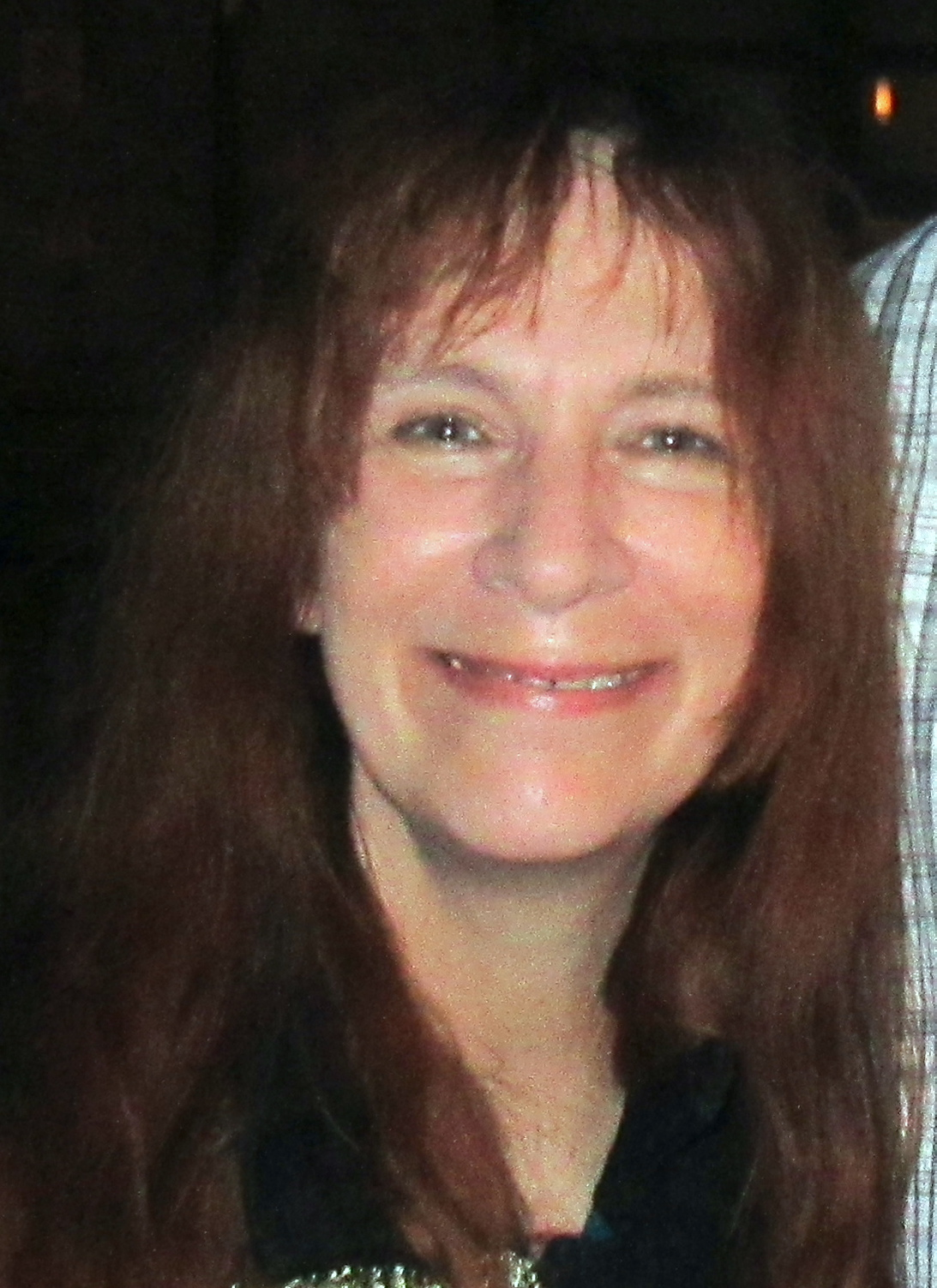
- Plummer in 2018
- Born: Amanda Michael Plummer; March 23, 1957 (age 69); New York City, U.S.
- Occupation: Actress
- Years active: 1977–present
- Parents: Christopher Plummer (father); Tammy Grimes (mother)
- Relatives: Isabella Mary Abbott (paternal grandmother); Elaine Taylor (stepmother)

Amanda Michael Plummer (born March 23, 1957) is an American and Canadian actress. She is known for her work on stage and in film, typically cast in strong female parts or eccentric roles. She made her film debut playing the title role in Cattle Annie and Little Britches (1981) and continued portraying supporting roles in films such as George Roy Hill's The World According to Garp (1982), Sidney Lumet's Daniel (1983), and Joe Versus the Volcano (1990). Plummer was nominated for a BAFTA Award for her role in Terry Gilliam's The Fisher King (1991) and gained further recognition for her role in Quentin Tarantino's Pulp Fiction (1994). Other film credits include So I Married an Axe Murderer (1993), The Prophecy (1995), Freeway (1996), A Simple Wish (1997), The Hunger Games: Catching Fire (2013), and Showing Up (2022).

Plummer also has had an extensive stage career, making her Broadway debut in 1981, as Josephine in A Taste of Honey, for which she was nominated for a Tony Award for Best Actress in a Play. She won a Tony Award in 1982 for her performance in Agnes of God. She has also appeared extensively in productions of the works of Tennessee Williams and starred in the original Off-Broadway production of Killer Joe in 1998.

On television, Plummer was nominated for a Primetime Emmy Award for her recurring role on L.A. Law (1989–1990). Later, she won the award three times, once for Outstanding Supporting Actress in a Miniseries or Special for the television film Miss Rose White (1992), and twice for Outstanding Guest Actress in a Drama Series for her guest roles in The Outer Limits (1996) and Law & Order: Special Victims Unit (2005). She was most recently nominated for a Saturn Award for Best Guest Starring Role on Television for her recurring role in Star Trek: Picard (2023).

== Early life ==
Plummer was born on March 23, 1957, in New York City, the only child of American actress Tammy Grimes and Canadian actor Christopher Plummer. Her father said that they named their daughter Amanda Michael after Amanda Prynne, a character from the play Private Lives, and the actress Michael Learned. She attended the elite Trinity School before graduating from the United Nations International School (UNIS). She attended Middlebury College for two and a half years, and as a young adult, studied acting at the Neighborhood Playhouse School of the Theatre in New York City.

== Career ==
Plummer has received critical acclaim for her film work, including such films as Cattle Annie and Little Britches (1981), The World According to Garp (1982), Daniel (1983), and The Hotel New Hampshire (1984). Other films of note include The Fisher King, for which she received a BAFTA film nomination (1992), a Chicago Film Critics Association Award nomination (1992), and a Los Angeles Film Critics Association Award (1992).

Her other films include Pulp Fiction, for which she received an American Comedy Award nomination, Girlfriend, Butterfly Kiss, My Life Without Me, Vampire, and Ken Park. She made her Broadway debut as Jo in the 1981 revival of A Taste of Honey, which ran for almost a year with Valerie French playing Helen, Jo's mother. She received a Tony Award nomination, a Theatre World, a Drama Desk, and an Outer Critics Circle Awards for her portrayal. She won a Tony Award for Featured Actress and the Drama Desk, Outer Critics Circle and Boston Critics Circle Awards for her portrayal of Agnes in Agnes of God, with Geraldine Page and Elizabeth Ashley. In 1983, she portrayed Laura Wingfield in a Broadway revival of The Glass Menagerie. Other Broadway performances include Dolly Clandon in You Never Can Tell (1986), and Eliza Doolittle in Pygmalion (1987, with Peter O'Toole and Osmund Bullock, for which she received her third Tony Award nomination, this time for Best Performance by a Leading Actress in a Play).

Her off-Broadway plays include as Beth in Sam Shepard's A Lie of the Mind, and Killer Joe, written by Tracy Letts. She has performed in many of Tennessee Williams' plays, including Summer and Smoke, The Gnädiges Fräulein, The Milk Train Doesn't Stop Here Anymore, and the world premiere of The One Exception.

In 1996, Plummer won an Emmy Award for her guest appearance on the episode "A Stitch in Time" of The Outer Limits. In 2005, she won an Emmy as Miranda Cole in the Law & Order: Special Victims Unit episode "Weak", in which she played a woman with schizophrenia.

She was nominated for a Golden Globe Award and received another Emmy Award for her performance in Miss Rose White, a Hallmark made-for-television film about a Holocaust survivor, for which she received the Anti-Defamation League Award. For her performance in Last Light (1993), she received a Cable Ace Award nomination. Her other awards include the Hollywood Drama Critics Award for her performance in the title female role in Romeo and Juliet, the Saturn Award for her performance as Nettie in Needful Things (1993), and a Cable Ace Award for her performance in The Right To Remain Silent (1996).

Plummer played Wiress, a former "tribute" who won the Hunger Games, in The Hunger Games: Catching Fire (2013), the film adaptation of the second novel of The Hunger Games trilogy, by Suzanne Collins. Plummer starred alongside Brad Dourif in the critically acclaimed Off Broadway revival of Tennessee Williams' The Two-Character Play at New World Stages in 2013.

In 2020, Plummer was featured in the Netflix drama series Ratched. Plummer plays Vadic, the main villain of the third and final season of Star Trek: Picard, in 2023.

== Personal life ==
Plummer dated screenwriter and director Paul Chart in the late 1990s. The two lived together in Los Angeles and worked together on Chart's film American Perfekt.

== Acting credits ==
=== Film ===
Year	Title	Role	Notes
1981	Cattle Annie and Little Britches	Anna "Cattle Annie" McDoulet	
1982	The World According to Garp	Ellen James	
1983	Daniel	Susan Isaacson	
1984	The Hotel New Hampshire	Miss Dawn Miscarriage	
1985	Static	Julia Purcell	
1987	Courtship	Laura Vaughn	
1987	Made in Heaven	Wiley Foxx	
1989	Prisoners of Inertia	Sam	
1990	Joe Versus the Volcano	Dagmar	
1991	The Fisher King	Lydia Sinclair	
1992	Freejack	Nun	
1992	The Lounge People	Sabrina	
1993	So I Married an Axe Murderer	Rose Michaels	
1993	Needful Things	Nettie Cobb	
1994	Pulp Fiction	Honey Bunny/Yolanda	
1994	Pax	Franny	
1995	Butterfly Kiss	Eunice	
1995	Nostradamus	Catherine de' Medici	
1995	The Final Cut	Rothstein	
1995	The Prophecy	Rachael	
1995	Drunks	Shelley	
1996	Dead Girl	Frida	
1996	Freeway	Ramona Lutz	
1997	American Perfekt	Sandra Thomas	
1997	Hercules	Clotho	Voice
1997	A Simple Wish	Boots	
1997	Hysteria	Myrna Malloy	
1998	You Can Thank Me Later	Susan Cooperbeg	
1998	L.A. Without a Map	Red Pool Owner	
1998	October 22	Denise	
1999	8½ Women	Beryl	
2000	The Million Dollar Hotel	Vivien	
2000	Seven Days to Live	Ellen Shaw	
2002	The Gray in Between	Jalyn	
2002	The Last Angel	The Last Angel	Short film
2002	Triggermen	Penny Archer	
2002	Ken Park	Claude's mother	
2003	My Life Without Me	Laurie	
2003	The Cruelest Day	Karin	
2003	Mimic 3: Sentinel	Simone Montrose	Direct-to-video
2004	Satan's Little Helper	Merrill Whooly	
2008	Inconceivable	Lesley Banks	
2008	Red	Mrs. Diane Doust	
2008	Affinity	Miss Helena Ridley	
2008	45 R.P.M.	Caralee Lucas	
2009	Samurai Avenger: The Blind Wolf	Lady in the Car	
2009	First Time Long Time	Maggie	Short film
2010	The Making of Plus One	Kim Owens	
2010	Girlfriend	Celeste	
2010	1001 Ways to Enjoy the Missionary Position	Nora	
2011	Vampire	Helga	
2011	Dr. Ketel	Louise	
2011	Today's Headline	Amy	Short film
2012	Sophomore	Miss June Hultz	
2012	Small Apartments	Mrs. Luigiana Ballisteri	
2012	Abigail Harm	Abigail Harm	
2012	I Have to Buy New Shoes	Joanne	
2013	The Hunger Games: Catching Fire	Wiress	
2014	Strangely in Love	Sister Sarah	
2015	Reversion	Elizabeth	
2016	The Dancer	Lili	
2016	Honeyglue	Alice	
2018	We Are Boats	Jimmie	
2018	A Young Man with High Potential	Ketura Stantz	
2018	Freaks of Nurture	Mom	Voice, short film
2019	Spiral Farm	Dianic	
2021	Night Raiders	Roberta	
2022	Showing Up	Dorothy	
2025	The Mastermind	Louise	
2025	Run	Anna	

=== Television ===
Year	Title	Role	Notes
1982	ABC Afterschool Special	Angela Dunoway	Episode: "The Unforgivable Secret"
1984	The Dollmaker	Mamie Childers	Television film
1987	Moonlighting	Jackie Wilbourne	Episode: "Take a Left at the Altar"
1988	The Equalizer	Jill O'Connor	Episode: "A Dance on the Dark Side"
1988	Gryphon	Ms. Annette Ferenczi	Television film
1989	Miami Vice	Lisa Madsen	Episode: "Fruit of the Poison Tree"
1989	Tales from the Crypt	Peggy	Episode: "Lover Come Hack to Me"
1989	HBO Storybook Musicals	Narrator	Episode: "The Story of the Dancing Frog"
1989	True Blue	Susan Lizar	Episode: "Pilot: Part 1"
1989–90	L.A. Law	Alice Hackett	6 episodes
1990	Kojak	Phyllis	Episode: "None So Blind"
1991	The Hidden Room	Sarah Cole	Episode: "A Type of Love Story"
1992	Sands of Time	Sister Graziella	Television film
1992	Miss Rose White	Lusia Burke	Television film
1993	Last Light	Lillian Burke	Television film
1993	Whose Child Is This? The War for Baby Jessica	Cara Clausen	Television film
1996,2000	The Outer Limits	Dr. Theresa Givens	2 episodes
1996	Duckman	Princess Fallopia	Voice, episode: "The Road to Dendron"
1996	The Right To Remain Silent	Paulina Marcos	Television film
1996	Don't Look Back	Bridget	Television film
1996	Under the Piano	Franny Basilio	Television film
1998	Stories from My Childhood	The Queen	Voice, episode: "The Twelve Months & The Snow Girl"
1999	The Apartment Complex	Miss Chenille	Television film
2002	Night Visions	Music Professor	Episode: "The Maze"
2002	Get a Clue	Miss Kim Dawson	Television film
2004	Law & Order: Special Victims Unit	Miranda Cole	Episode: "Weak"
2006	Battlestar Galactica	Oracle Selloi	Episode: "Exodus"
2007	WordGirl	Lady Redundant Woman	Voice, episode: "Lady Redundant Woman"
2009–13	Phineas and Ferb	Professor Poofenplotz	Voice, 3 episodes
2014	Hannibal	Katherine Pims	Episode: "Takiawase"
2015	The Blacklist	Tracy Solobotkin	Episode: "The Deer Hunter"
2020	Ratched	Louise	7 episodes
2023	Star Trek: Picard	Captain Vadic	6 episodes

=== Theater ===
Year	Title	Role	Notes
1978	A Midsummer's Night Dream	Robin Starveling	Williamstown Theatre Festival, Massachusetts
1978	Gossip	Anna	Williamstown Theatre Festival, Massachusetts
1978	Wild Oats	Jane	Williamstown Theatre Festival, Massachusetts
1978	The Overcoat	Bag Lady	Williamstown Theatre Festival, Massachusetts
1979	Artichoke	Lily-Agnes	New York City Center, Off-Broadway
1979	A Month in the Country	Vera Aleksandrovna	23rd Street Theatre, Off-Broadway
1980	The Member of the Wedding	Frankie Addams	Hartford Stage, Connecticut
1980–81	Alice in Concert	Performer	The Public Theater, Off-Broadway
1981	A Taste of Honey	Josephine	Century Theatre, Broadway
1982	The Wake of Jamey Foster	Pixrose Wilson	Hartford Stage, Connecticut
1982–83	Agnes of God	Sister Agnes	Music Box Theatre, Broadway
1983	Lee Harvey Oswald	Marina	Bayview Playhouse, Toronto, Canada
1983	Romeo and Juliet	Juliet	Mandell Weiss Theatre, La Jolla, San Diego
1983–84	The Glass Menagerie	Laura Wingfield	Eugene O'Neill Theatre, Broadway
1984	As You Like It	Celia	Mandell Weiss Theatre, La Jolla, San Diego
1985–86	A Lie of the Mind	Beth	Promenade Theatre, Broadway
1986–87	You Never Can Tell	Dolly Clandon	Circle in the Square Theatre, Broadway
1987	Pygmalion	Eliza Doolittle	Plymouth Theatre, Broadway
1987	The Milk Train Doesn't Stop Here Anymore	Blackie	WPA Theater, Off-Broadway
1988	Two Rooms	Lainie Wells	Mandell Weiss Theatre, La Jolla, San Diego
1990	Abundance	Bess	New York City Center, Off-Broadway
1998–99	Killer Joe	Sharla Smith	SoHo Playhouse, Off-Broadway
2003	The Exonerated	Sunny Jacobs	Bleecker Street Theatre, Off-Broadway
2003	Uncle Vanya	Sonya	McCarter Theatre, Princeton, New Jersey
2003	Uncle Vanya	Sonya	Mandell Weiss Theatre, La Jolla, San Diego
2005	The Lark	Joan of Arc	Festival Theatre, Stratford, Ontario
2006–07	Summer and Smoke	Alma Winemiller	Paper Mill Playhouse, New Jersey
2013	The Two-Character Play	Clare	New World Stages, Off-Broadway
2017	The Night of the Iguana	Hannah Jelkes	American Repertory Theater, Cambridge, Massachusetts
2018	Talisman Roses	Ethel	Provincetown Theater, Massachusetts

=== Video games ===
Year	Title	Role	Notes
1997	Hercules	Clotho	

== Awards and nominations ==
Theatre
Year	Award	Category	Nominated work	Result	Ref.
1982	Tony Awards	Best Actress in a Play	A Taste of Honey	Nominated	
1982	Tony Awards	Best Featured Actress in a Play	Agnes of God	Won	
1987	Tony Awards	Best Actress in a Play	Pygmalion	Nominated	
1981	Drama Desk Awards	Outstanding Actress in a Play	A Taste of Honey	Nominated	
1982	Drama Desk Awards	Outstanding Featured Actress in a Play	Agnes of God	Won	
1981	Theatre World Awards	—N/a	A Taste of Honey	Won	

Film & television
Year	Award	Category	Nominated work	Result	Ref.
1992	BAFTA Awards	Best Actress in a Supporting Role	The Fisher King	Nominated	
1993	Golden Globe Awards	Best Supporting Actress – Series, Miniseries or Television Film	Miss Rose White	Nominated	
1989	Primetime Emmy Awards	Outstanding Supporting Actress in a Drama Series	L.A. Law (Note: Nominated for her performance in the Season 3 episodes "America the Beautiful", "Urine Trouble Now" & "Consumed Innocence".)	Nominated	
1992	Primetime Emmy Awards	Outstanding Supporting Actress in a Limited or Anthology Series or Movie	Miss Rose White	Won	
1996	Primetime Emmy Awards	Outstanding Guest Actress in a Drama Series	The Outer Limits (Note: Won for her performance in the Season 2 episode "A Stitch in Time".)	Won	
2005	Primetime Emmy Awards	Outstanding Guest Actress in a Drama Series	Law & Order: Special Victims Unit (Note: Won for her performance in the Season 6 episode "Weak".)	Won	
1991	Los Angeles Film Critics Association Awards	Best Supporting Actress	The Fisher King	Runner-up	
1992	Chicago Film Critics Association Awards	Best Supporting Actress	The Fisher King	Nominated	
1992	Dallas–Fort Worth Film Critics Association Awards	Best Supporting Actress	The Fisher King	Nominated	
1993	CableAce Awards	Actress in a Dramatic Series	The Hidden Room (Note: Nominated for her performance in Season 1 episode "A Type of Love Story".)	Nominated	
1994	CableAce Awards	Supporting Actress in a Movie or Miniseries	Last Light	Nominated	
1996	CableAce Awards	Supporting Actress in a Movie or Miniseries	The Right to Remain Silent	Won	
1996	CableAce Awards	Actress in a Dramatic Special/Series	The Outer Limits (Note: Won for her performance in the Season 2 episode "A Stitch in Time".)	Nominated	
1994	Awards Community Circuit Awards	Best Cast Ensemble	Pulp Fiction (Note: Award shared with John Travolta, Samuel L. Jackson, Uma Thurman, Tim Roth, Harvey Keitel, Ving Rhames, Bruce Willis, Eric Stoltz & Rosanna Arquette.)	Won	
1994	Fangoria Chainsaw Awards	Best Supporting Actress	Needful Things	Nominated	
2006	Fangoria Chainsaw Awards	Best Supporting Actress	Satan's Little Helper	Nominated	
1994	Saturn Awards	Best Supporting Actress	Needful Things	Won	
2024	Saturn Awards	Best Guest Starring Role on Television	Star Trek: Picard	Nominated	
1995	American Comedy Awards	Funniest Supporting Actress in a Motion Picture	Pulp Fiction	Nominated	
2003	DVD Exclusive Awards	Best Actress in a DVD Premiere Movie	Mimic 3: Sentinel	Nominated	
2016	Oldenburg International Film Festival	German Independence Honorary Award (Tribute)	—N/a	Won	
2019	Oldenburg International Film Festival	Star of Excellence (Walk of Fame)	—N/a	Won	
2022	Vancouver Film Critics Circle Awards	Best Supporting Actress (Canadian)	Night Raiders	Nominated	
2024	Independent Spirit Robert Altman Award		Showing Up (Note: Award shared with Kelly Reichardt, Gayle Keller, André Benjamin, Hong Chau, Judd Hirsch, Heather Lawless, James Le Gros, John Magaro, Matt Malloy, Maryann Plunkett, Denzel Rodriguez & Michelle Williams. The award will officially be presented at the 2024 ceremony.)	Won	

== See also ==
- List of Tony Award records
