= Purple Sea =

2009 film by Donatella Maiorca

- theatrical release poster
- Directed by: Donatella Maiorca
- Written by: Donatella Maiorca, Pina Mandolfo, Mario Cristiani, Donatella Diamanti
- Based on: Minchia di re by Giacomo Pilati
- Produced by: Maria Grazia Cucinotta, Giovanna Emidi, Silvia Natili, Rosanna Thau, Giulio Violati
- Starring: Valeria Solarino; Isabella Ragonese; Ennio Fantastichini; Giselda Volodi; Lucrezia Lante della Rovere; Maria Grazia Cucinotta
- Cinematography: Roberta Allegrini
- Edited by: Marco Spoletini
- Music by: Gianna Nannini
- Production company: Italian Dreams Factory
- Release date: October 2009
- Running time: 105 minutes
- Country: Italy
- Language: Italian

Purple Sea (Italian: Viola di mare) is a 2009 Italian romance drama film directed by Donatella Maiorca. It is based on the non-fiction novel Minchia di re written by Giacomo Pilati. The film premiered at the 2009 Rome Film Festival. It was nominated for two Nastro d'Argento Awards, for Best Actress (Valeria Solarino) and Best Original Song ("Sogno" by Gianna Nannini).

== Plot summary ==
The film tells the love story between Angela and Sara in 19th-century Sicily (circa 1860, during the Expedition of the Thousand). To survive the scandal, Angela's family winds up passing her off as a boy, going so far as to alter her birth certificate. Angela cuts her hair short and hides her own femininity, in defiance of the mentality of the place.

== Production ==
Produced by the Italian Dreams Factory, with the support of the Italian Ministry of Cultural Heritage and Activities and the Region of Sicily. The movie, filmed in San Vito Lo Capo, Trapani, and Favignana, was shown at the 2009 Rome Film Festival and distributed to theaters on October 16, 2009.

== Meaning of the title ==
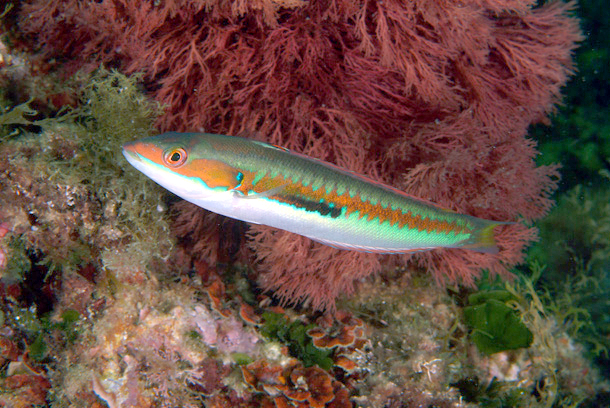
Coris julis, Tyrrhenian Sea

The film's title refers to the Sicilian name of the Mediterranean rainbow wrasse (Coris julis), a protogynous fish that is born female and turns male as it grows older.

The Viola (violet) is a fish and God has willed it. When it is male it is called Minchia di Re (king's penis). For love it becomes female and has the colors of the flower. It turns male again after the water has taken its eggs.

== Reception ==
The film won two awards at the 2009 New Italian Cinematic Events festival: the Città di Firenze Award for best film and the Susan Batson Award for best actress, Valeria Solarino in the role of Angela. The N.I.C.E. festival, run by Viviana del Bianco, represents the most important festival of Italian cinema in America, with showings in New York, San Francisco, and Seattle. At the International Gay and Lesbian Film Festival of Bilbao in 2011, Valeria Solarino won the award for best actress and Isabella Ragonese received special mention. Viola di mare won the 2009 Capri Peace Award. The film was nominated for the Marc'Aurelio d'Oro for best film at the Rome Film Festival. It was an official selection at the 2010 San Francisco Frameline Film Festival.

A screenshot from the film

== Cast ==
- Valeria Solarino: Angela/Angelo
- Isabella Ragonese: Sara
- Ennio Fantastichini: Salvatore
- Giselda Volodi: Lucia
- Maria Grazia Cucinotta: Agnese
- Marco Foschi: Tommaso
- Lucrezia Lante Della Rovere: Baronessa
- Corrado Fortuna: Ventura
- Alessio Vassallo: Nicolino
- Giovan Battista Costa: Young Nicolino
- Ester Cucinotti: Concetta

== See also ==
- F-rating
- LGBT history in Italy
- Women's cinema
