= Éric Assous =

French screenwriter (1956–2020)

Éric Assous (30 March 1956 – 12 October 2020) was a French director, screenwriter, dialoguist, and dramatist born in Tunis.

== Career ==
Assous was the author of 80 radio plays for the France Inter channel.

He wrote numerous plays, as well as scenarios for television (including 3 episodes of the Nestor Burma series) and cinema.

Assous directed his first feature film, Les gens en maillot de bain ne sont pas (forcément) superficiels in 2001.

In 2002, he penned a comedy entitled Sexes très opposés.

== Filmography ==
=== Director ===
- 1999: À cause d'Olivia... short film
- 2001: Les gens en maillot de bain ne sont pas (forcément) superficiels
- 2002: Sexes très opposés
- 2003: Amour tout court

=== Screenwriter ===
- Les acteurs sont fatigués (Prochainement), by Olivier Marchal
- 2010: 22 Bullets by Richard Berry
- 2008: Nos 18 ans by Frédéric Berthe
- 2008: Love Me No More by Jean Becker
- 2008: Les Randonneurs à Saint-Tropez by Philippe Harel
- 2005: The Black Box by Richard Berry
- 2005: Tu vas rire, mais je te quitte by Philippe Harel
- 2003: I, Cesar by Richard Berry
- 2002: Sexes très opposés (2002)
- 2002: Irène by Ivan Calbérac
- 2001: The Girl from Paris by Christian Carion
- 2001: Les gens en maillot de bain ne sont pas (forcément) superficiels by Éric Assous
- 1998: Petits Désordres amoureux by Olivier Péray
- 1997: The Banned Woman by Philippe Harel
- 1997: Les Randonneurs by Philippe Harel
- 1993: Une femme pour moi by Arnaud Sélignac
- 1987: Babette (Intrigues) by Emmanuel Fonlladosa

=== Dialoguist ===
- 2005: Tu vas rire, mais je te quitte by Philippe Harel
- 2002: Sexes très opposés

== Theatre ==
- 1992: Sans mentir, directed by Éric Assous and Bernard Menez, Théâtre des Bouffes-Parisiens
- 1992: Une fille entre nous, Théâtre d'Edgar
- 1995: Le Portefeuille by Pierre Sauvil and Éric Assous, directed by Jean-Luc Moreau, Théâtre Saint-Georges
- 1998: Couple en turbulences, Comédie de Paris
- 2002: Les acteurs sont fatigués, directed by Jacques Décombe, Comédie-Caumartin
- 2002: Retour de Madison, directed by Éric Assous, played by Roger Miremont, Festival Off, Avignon.
- 2004: Les Montagnes russes, played by Alain Delon and Astrid Veillon in 2004 and 2005, Théâtre Marigny
- 2007: Les Belles-Sœurs, directed by Jean-Luc Moreau, Théâtre Saint-Georges (and tour in 2008)
- 2008: Secret de famille, directed by Jean-Luc Moreau, with Michel Sardou and Davy Sardou, Théâtre des Variétés.
- 2009: Les hommes préfèrent mentir, directed by Jean-Luc Moreau, Théâtre Saint-Georges
- 2009: L'Illusion conjugale, directed by Jean-Luc Moreau, Théâtre de l'Œuvre
- 2010: Le Technicien, directed by Jean-Luc Moreau, Théâtre du Palais-Royal
- 2011: Une journée ordinaire, directed by Jean-Luc Moreau, Théâtre des Bouffes-Parisiens
- 2011: Les Conjoints, directed by Jean-Luc Moreau, Théâtre Tristan-Bernard
- 2011: Mon meilleur copain, directed by Jean-Luc Moreau, Théâtre des Nouveautés
- 2012: L'Italienne, directed by David Garcia, Théâtre Le Funambule Montmartre
- 2012: Le Bonheur, directed by Jean-Luc Moreau, Théâtre Marigny
- 2013: Nos femmes, directed by Richard Berry, Théâtre de Paris
- 2015: On ne se mentira jamais, directed by Jean-Luc Moreau, Théâtre La Bruyère (adapted into English by Stewart Vaughan as No more lies)
- 2015: Représailles, directed by Anne Bourgeois, Théâtre de la Michodière
- 2016: L'heureux élu, directed by Jean Luc Moreau, Théâtre de la Madeleine

== Prizes and nominations ==
- 2010: Molière de l'auteur francophone vivant for L'Illusion conjugale
- 2014: Grand prix du théâtre de l'Académie française for all his theatre work
- 2015: Molière de l'auteur francophone vivant for On ne se mentira jamais !
