= Cambridge Film Festival =

Annual film festival held in Cambridge UK

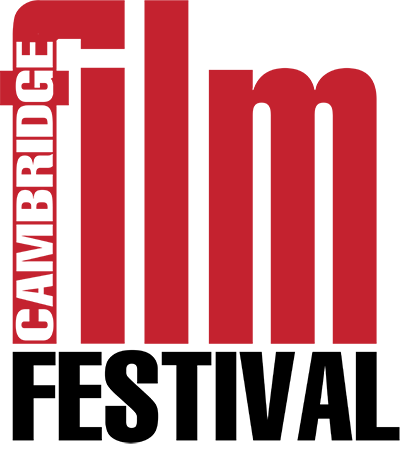
- Location: Cambridge, UK
- Founded: 1977; 49 years ago
- Most recent: 23 Oct - 2 Nov, 2025
- Awards: Golden Punt, Audience Awards & others
- Hosted by: Cambridge Film Trust
- Website: cambridgefilmfestival.org.uk

The Cambridge Film Festival is the third-longest-running film festival in the UK. It is a qualifying event for both the BAFTA and BIFA awards. Historically, the festival took place in early July, but now it occurs annually during autumn in Cambridge. It is organised by the registered charity Cambridge Film Trust.

Established in 1977 and re-launched in 2001 after a 5-year hiatus, the Cambridge Film Festival shows a range of UK and international films that debuted at leading film festivals, including the Cannes Film Festival and Berlin Film Festival, as well as hosting UK premieres of films, alongside a broad range of specialist interest, archive, and retrospective strands. All films are open to the public to watch.

Long-time Festival Director, Tony Jones, stepped down following the 2019 Festival.

For almost 40 years, he oversaw all aspects of the Festival after joining in 1980.

Following his departure, a new programming panel was set up, incorporating new and existing CFF programmers.

The Panel was fully established in 2022 under the leadership of Elle Haywood, a film curator and critic with a background in film, media and technology, and includes programmers Savina Petkova, Amon Warmann, Ramon Lamarca, the panel is supported by Short Film Programmer Abby Pollock and several Programme Advisors.

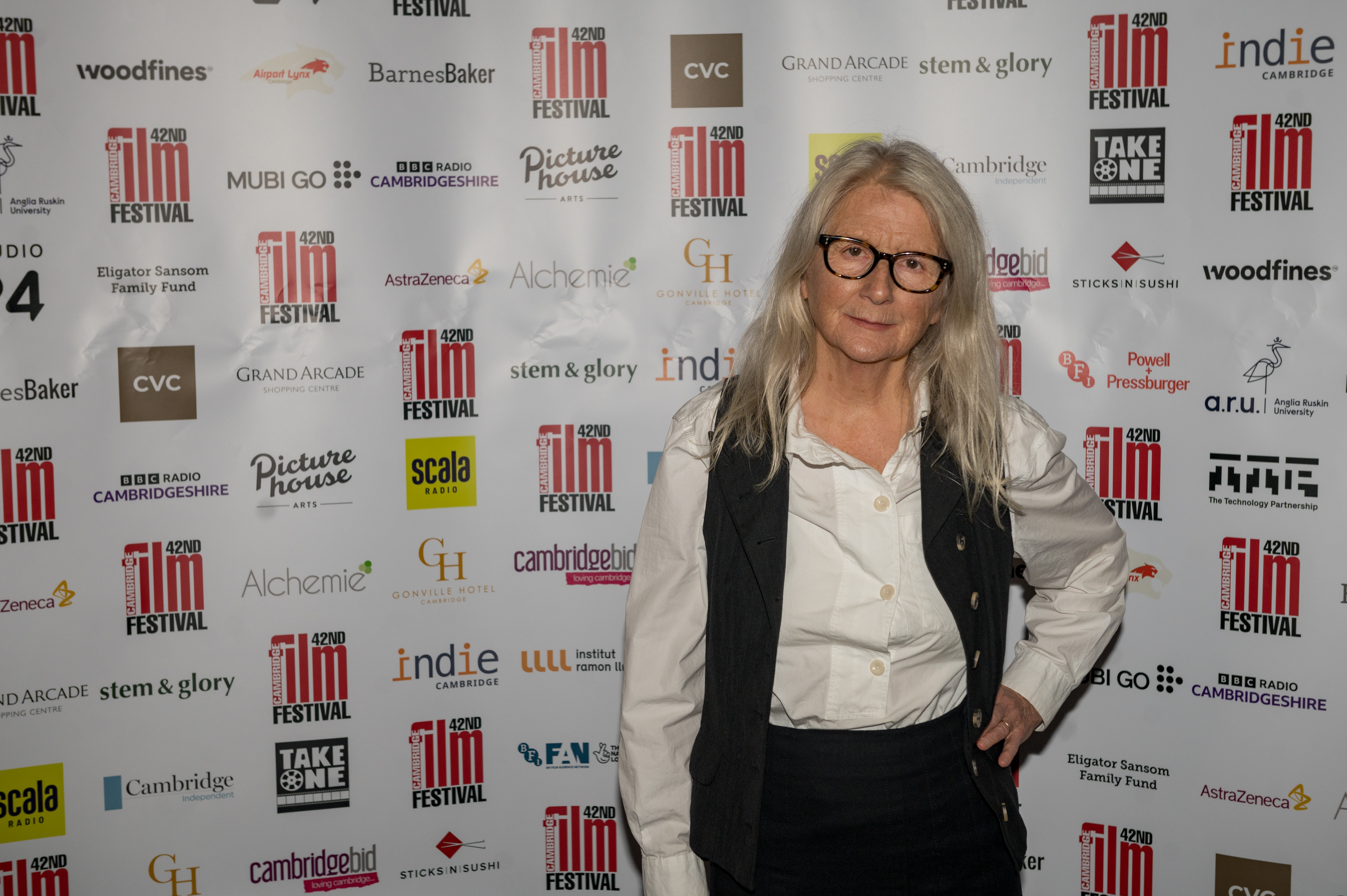
Sally Potter at CFF42 for a Q&A for Orlando.

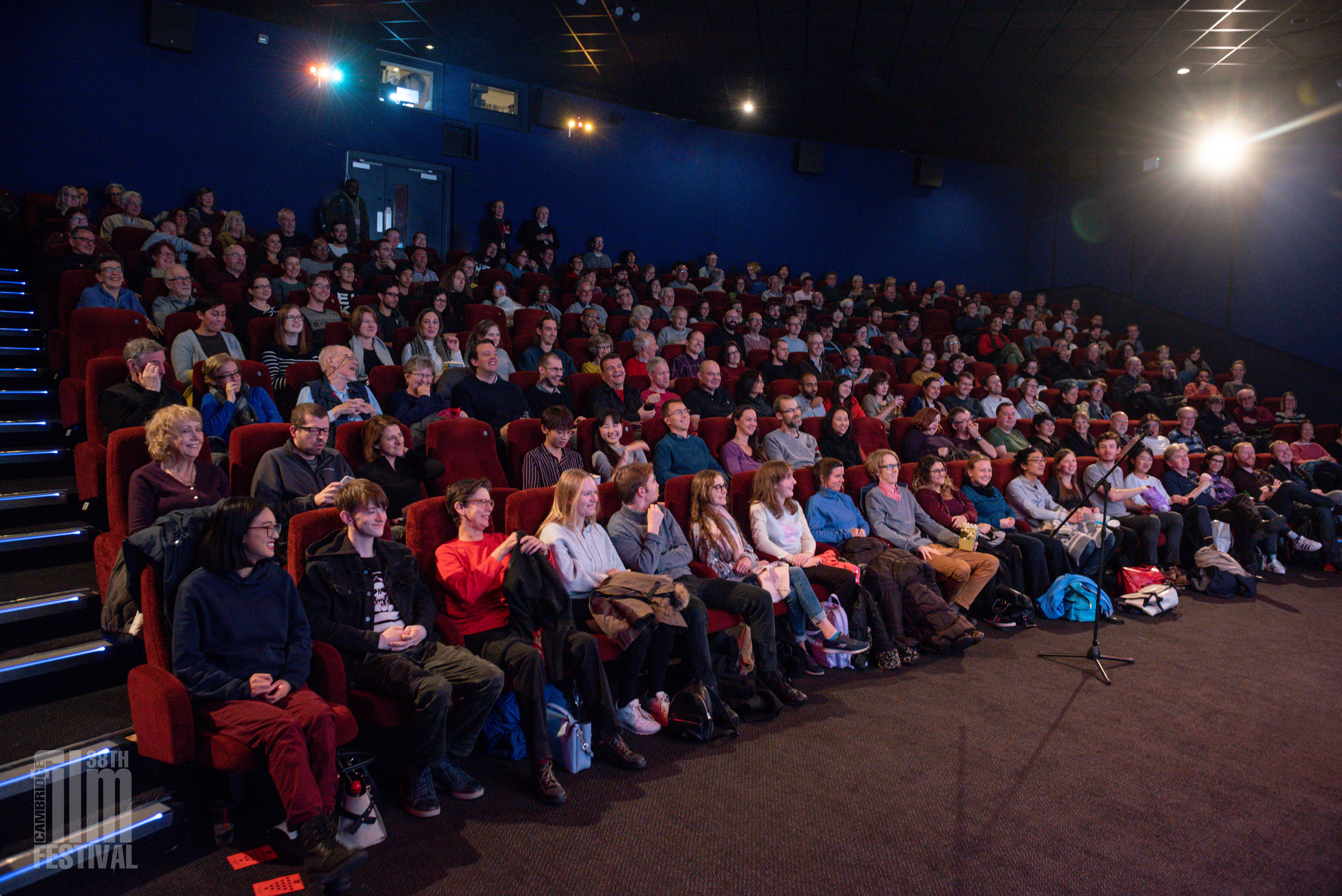
The Cambridge Film Festival audience.

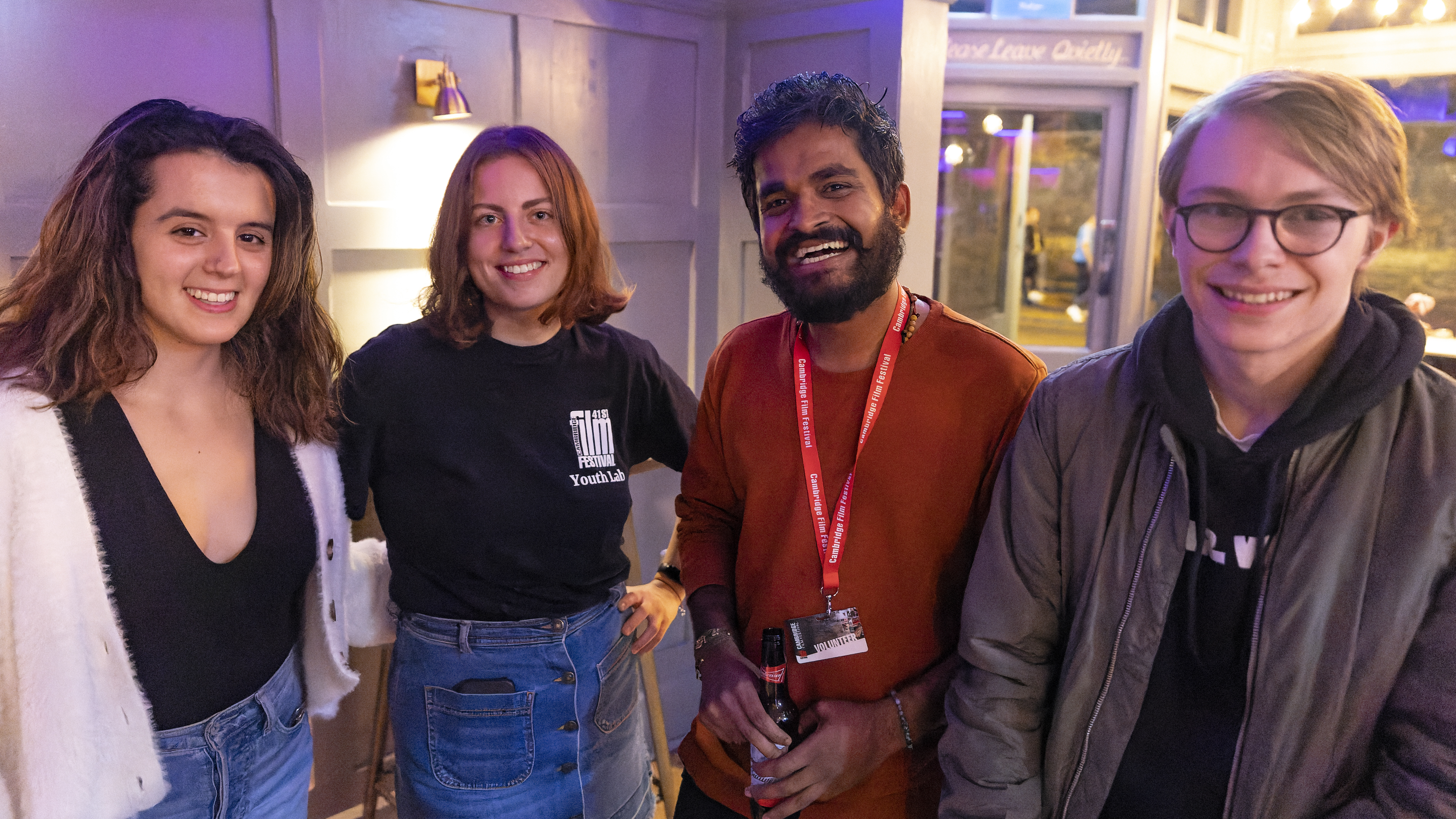
Members of the CFF Youth Lab at the 2022 Festival.

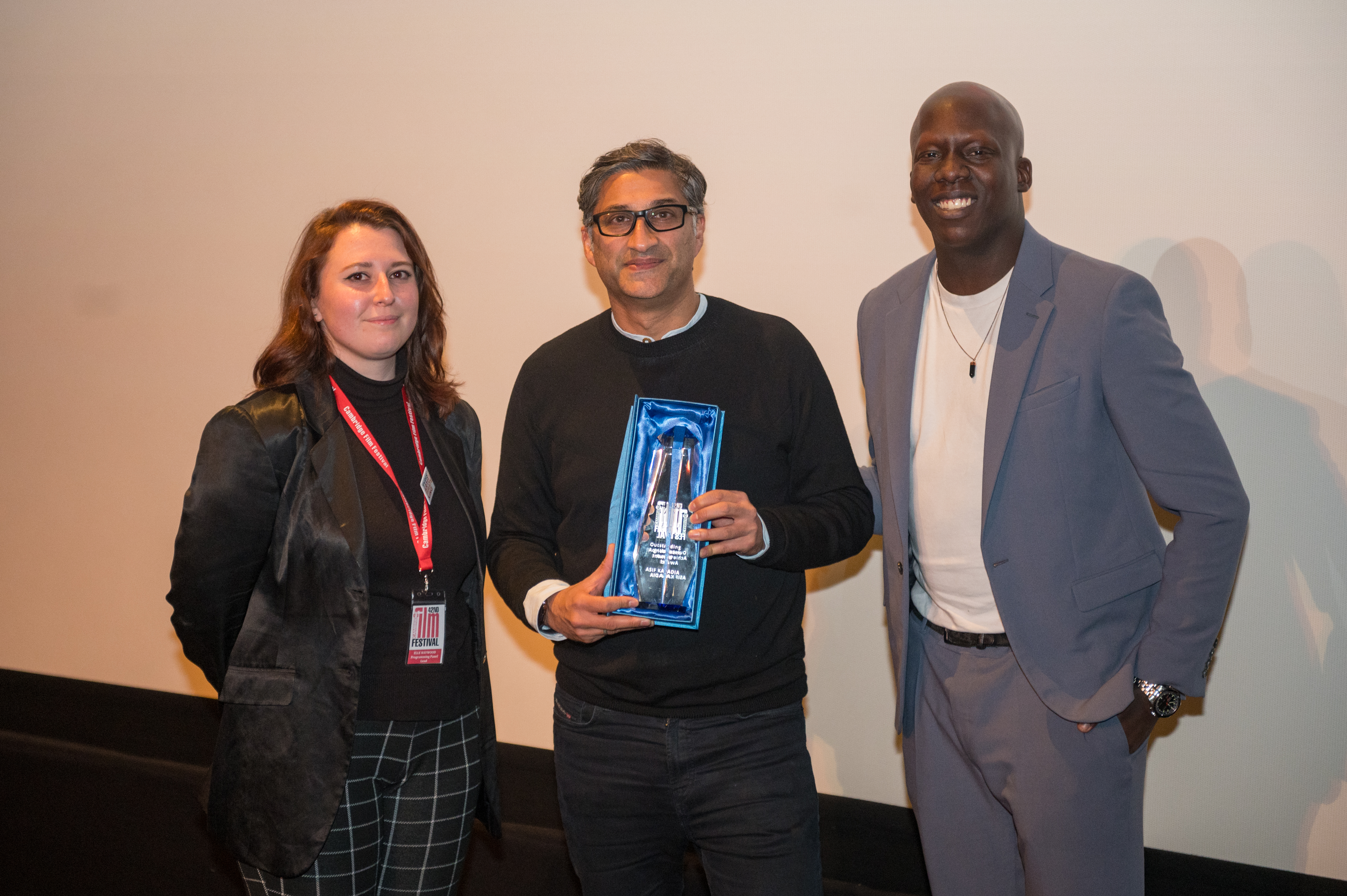
Filmmaker Asif Kapadia - CFF Outstanding Contribution to Cinema - 2023.

== Awards ==
Each year, the Cambridge Film Festival presents several audience and Jury awards.

Since 2019 the Festival has also awarding the Youth Lab Jury Award, and the CFF Outstanding Contribution to Cinema Award.

=== Cambridge Film Festival Outstanding Contribution Award ===
- 2026 - Clio Barnard - Director
- 2025 -
- 2024 - Daniel Kaluuya - Actor and director
- 2023 - Asif Kapadia - Director and documentarian
- 2022 - Emma Thompson - Actor and screenwriter
- 2020 - No award
- 2019 - Tony Jones - Festival director

=== Golden Punt Jury Award - Best Discovery Feature ===
- 2025 - Sleepless City by Guillermo Galoe.
- 2024 - Nebelkind - The End of Silence by Tereza Kotyk

=== Audience Award - Best Fiction Feature ===
- 2025 - Beautiful Evening, Beautiful Day by Ivona Juka
- 2024 - Nebelkind - The End of Silence by Tereza Kotyk
- 2023 - Creatura by Elena Martín Gimeno
- 2022 - Little Nicholas, Happy As Can Be by Amandine Fredon & Benjamin Massoubre
- 2021 - Coppelia by Jeff Tudor, Steven De Beul & Ben Tesseur
- 2020 - No award
- 2019 - Castle of Dreams by Reza Mirkarimi
- 2018 - Shoplifters by Hirokazu Kore-eda
- 2017 -
- 2016 - Chocolat by Roschdy Zem
- 2015 - Bill by Richard Bracewell
- 2014 - Monica Z by Per Fly
- 2013 - The Forgotten Kingdom by Andrew Mudge

=== Audience Award - Best Documentary Feature ===
- 2025 - Shades of Survival by David Ayeni
- 2024 - The Cigarette Surfboard by Ben Judkins
- 2023 - Pure Clean Water by Tony Eva
- 2022 - Seaside Special by Jens Meurer
- 2021 – Film: The Living Record of Our Memory by Inés Toharia
- 2019 - Streetkids United III by Jacco Groen
- 2018 - Letter from Masanjia by Leon Lee
- 2017 -
- 2016 - Future Baby by Maria Arlamovsky
- 2015 - Streetkids United II: The Girls From Rio by Maria Clara Costa
- 2014 - A Poem In Exile by Alba Gómez
- 2013 - Black Africa, White Marble by Clemente Bococchi

=== Audience Award - Best Short Film ===
- 2025 - Monsters by Andy Field and Beckie Darlington
- 2024 - Magic Candies by Daisuke NISHIO
- 2023 - The Snip by Ben S. Hyland
- 2022 - Till the Music Stops by Emilie De Monsabert
- 2021 - Georgia by Jayil Pak
- 2019 - Alina by Rami Kodeih
- 2018 - Bogdan i Róża by Milena Dutkowska
- 2017 -
- 2016 - Speechless by Robin Polák
- 2015 - Group B by Nick Rowland
- 2014 - The Showreel by Keir Burrows
- 2013 - Rhino Full Throttle by Erik Schmitt

=== CFF Youth Lab Jury Award ===
- 2024 - Silent Trees by Agnieszka Zwiefka
- 2023 - Fledgelings by Lidia Duda
- 2022 - Pushing Boundaries by Lesia Kordonets
- 2021 - Nico by Eline Gehring
- 2019

== History ==
=== The birth of CFF - 1970s ===
==== 1977 ====
In 1977 the first Festival set the pattern, with screenings of Kurosawa's Dodes'ka-den, Visconti's Conversation Piece and Rosi's Illustrious Corpses.

Originally based at the single-screen Arts Cinema in Cambridge city centre's Market Passage, the Festival was originally conceived with a two-fold purpose: as a means of screening current international Cinema and to rediscover important but neglected filmmakers and their films, which were either out of distribution or unseen for many years.

==== 1978 ====
The second Cambridge Film Festival in 1978 hosted the UK Premiere of The Chess Players. It was the centrepiece of a Satyajit Ray retrospective and marks the establishment of the Retrospective Strand. The programme also included Rudolph's Welcome to L.A., Jarman's Jubilee and Harlan County, USA.

==== 1979 ====
The third Cambridge Film Festival in 1979 included the premieres of Ingmar Bergman's Autumn Sonata, Herzog's Nosferatu and Altman's A Wedding. 1979 also featured a retrospective on the Polish filmmaker Andrzej Wajda.

=== The early years and growth of the Festival - 1980s & ‘90s ===
==== 1980 ====
At the fourth Festival in 1980, audiences saw the UK premieres of Petit's Radio On, Roeg's Bad Timing and Loach's Black Jack.

==== 1981 ====
1981 marked the fifth Festival and the first Festival with long running Festival Director Tony Jones at the helm.

The Festival in 1981 screened a newly restored version of Gance's Napoleon, alongside a Bertrand Tavernier retrospective. It was also the first year to have 'away' screenings at the Arts Theatre in St Edward's Passage.

==== 1982 ====
1982 saw a general widening of the Festival programme and hosted the UK Premiere of another Werner Herzog film, Fitzcarraldo.

==== 1983 ====
In 1983, the 7th Festival hosted the Premiere Sayles' Lianna. The Retrospective Strand was focused on Indian filmmaker Mrinal Sen.

==== 1984 ====
In 1984, at the 8th Festival, Wim Wenders was in attendance to present his film Paris, Texas. For the Retrospective Strand, the work of Volker Schlondorff was highlighted.

==== 1985 ====
At the 9th Cambridge Film Festival, Francesco Rosi introduced Carmen to audiences as part of his retrospective. A second retrospective strand on Percy Adlon was also featured.

==== 1986 ====
At the 10th Festival in 1986, a new print of Powell and Pressburger's Gone to Earth was screened. Other screenings that year included Mona Lisa directed by Neil Jordan, and the film and TV work of David Hare.

==== 1987 ====
In 1987, at the 11th CFF, Peter Greenaway presented The Belly of an Architect. This was part of a 'Made in Britain' programme, which also includes a John McGrath retrospective.

==== 1988 ====
The 12th Festival 1988 had Jean-Claude Carriere as a guest. The Unbearable Lightness of Being was the centrepiece of a Philip Kaufman retrospective.

==== 1989 ====
In 1989, there were retrospectives on Robert Bresson and Working Title. There was also a tribute to John Cassavetes and a series of films to investigate the influence of Cahiers du Cinéma, and Buster Keaton's Sherlock Jnr.

==== 1990 ====
At the 14th Festival, the programme included a Pedro Almodovar Retrospective and screenings of Malle's Milou In May alongside Stillman's Metropolitan.

==== 1991 ====
At the 15th Festival, the Festival screened Premieres of Scott's Thelma And Louise and the Coen Brothers' Barton Fink. The retrospective in 1991 was of Monika Treut.

==== 1992 ====
At the 16th Festival, there were the UK premieres of Reservoir Dogs and August's The Best Intentions. Bruce Beresford and Agnieszka Holland attended retrospectives of their work, and there was a tribute to BFI film production.

==== 1993 ====
At the 17th Festival, Peter Greenaway attended the UK Premiere of The Baby of Macon. Other titles included Sayles' Passion Fish and Haas' The Music of Chance.

==== 1994 ====
At the 18th Cambridge Film Festival, there was the premiere of the Three Colours trilogy as part of the first-ever full Kieslowski retrospective.

==== 1995 ====
In 1995, at the 19th Festival, Jeunet and Caro attended the Premiere of The City of Lost Children. The Festival's centennial tribute to Buster Keaton contained his rarely seen final masterpieces: The Cameraman and Spite Marriage. Two other retrospectives celebrated Patricia Rozema and Lars von Trier.

==== 1996 ====
At the 20th Festival, French critic Michel Ciment introduced a French programme which included Audiard's A Self-Made Hero and Breillat's Parfait amour!. Greenaway's The Pillow Book premiered and retrospectives featured Jack Cardiff and Jan Jakub Kolski.

=== The Festival takes a break! - 1997-2000 ===
Due to the closure of the Cambridge Arts Cinema, following the 20th Festival in 1996, the Festival was forced to hibernate while a new home was found.

=== Cambridge Film Festival is reborn - The 2000s ===
==== 2001 ====
2001 featured the premieres of Sidewalks of New York, Brotherhood of the Wolf, Otesanek, Beijing Bicycle, Betelnut Beauty, Swordfish, Scratch, The Isle & Sw9. As part of 70mm Widescreen Weekends the Festival screened 2001: A Space Odyssey, The King and I, Lawrence of Arabia, Pathfinder, My Fair Lady, and Vertigo.

==== 2002 ====
The festival launched with the UK Premiere of Talk To Her and closed with the UK Premiere of David Cronenberg's Spider.

Other premieres included Bowling for Columbine, Lost in La Mancha, Gerry, Heaven, and Intacto. Alex Cox attended the premiere of his Revengers Tragedy, and Richard Harris made one of his last public appearances at the UK premiere of My Kingdom. Peter Wintonick attended a season of his work, and the festival hosted tributes to Milos Forman, Tod Browning and Lon Chaney, and Darius Mehrjui.

==== 2003 ====
Amongst 50 UK premieres the festival screened Spirited Away, Pirates of the Caribbean, Goodbye, Lenin!, Time Of The Wolf, All the Real Girls, Belleville Rendezvous, Whale Rider and Spellbound; Cate Blanchett and Joel Schumacher attended a special screening of Veronica Guerin, Jane Birkin presented Merci Dr Rey, and Peter Greenaway attended the premiere of his Tulse Luper Suitcases Part One: The Moab Story. The festival hosted the first UK Film Parliament and held an Alexander Dovzhenko retrospective.

==== 2004 ====
2004 Highlights amongst the festival's 47 UK premieres included Stage Beauty, Before Sunset, Super Size Me, Clean, Comme Une Image, Coffee And Cigarettes, Riding Giants, Spike Lee's She Hate Me, and Robert Lepage's The Far Side of the Moon.

The Festival brought scores of international filmmakers to Cambridge: Sir Richard Eyre launched the festival at the opening night presentation of Stage Beauty; Julie Delpy presented the closing night screening of Before Sunset; and Robert Carradine introduced the UK premiere of Sam Fuller's The Big Red One: The Reconstruction.

==== 2005 ====
A packed silver jubilee programme included UK premieres of The Last Mitterrand; Crash; Broken Flowers; Hayao Miyazaki's Howl's Moving Castle, introduced by the author of the film's source novel, Diana Wynne Jones. King's Game; Nightwatch; Saraband; Silver City (attended by director John Sayles); With Blood On My Hands - Pusher 2 introduced by director Nicolas Winding Refn, who also curated a season of films that have influenced his work; Ghost in the Shell: 2: Innocence; Enron: The Smartest Guys In The Room; Rock School; and Forest For The Trees, alongside a Studio Ghibli season and a retrospective for the Russian silent director Dziga Vertov.

==== 2006 ====
Two significant additions to the festival proved highly popular: an ambitious programme of free screenings introducing artists' moving image work to new viewers and the daily festival podcasts. This year, Volver won the Audience Award.

==== 2007 ====
UK premieres included the opening night film Lady Chatterley, Anna M, The Walker, and the latest film from Studio Ghibli, Tales From Earthsea. The festival closed with UK premieres of The Hoax and The 11th Hour. A season celebrating the best in New German Cinema was once again curated by Monika Treut, and eclectic shorts and documentaries, including The Man Who Shot Chinatown and Deliver Us From Evil, contributed to the programme. Kenneth Branagh and Brian Blessed attended As You Like It.

==== 2008 ====
In 2008, the Festival opened with Walter Salles' Linha De Passe, and Tilda Swinton was one of the guests for the UK premiere of Julia.

The retrospective this year was on Derek Jarman: Remembered season, and Hey Negrita played a live set after a screening of the documentary We Dreamed America. Peter Greenaway attended a Q&A for his film "Nightwatching.

==== 2009 ====
A collaboration with the Festival and BAFTA brought Michael Palin: A Life In Pictures, where Mark Kermode interviewed Michael Palin at Ely Cathedral.

David Mitchell and Robert Webb were joined by writers Sam Bain and Jesse Armstrong, previewing an episode from the new series of Peep Show, showing clips of their favourite moments and taking the audience's questions.

=== The UK's 3rd longest running Film Festival - 2010s ===
==== 2010 ====
2010 the closing night film was Made in Dagenham. Festival regular and film music master Neil Brand hosted a workshop about creating music for film, and director Stephen Frears took part in a career retrospective, as well as discussing his latest film, Tamara Drewe. Also, The Dodge Brothers accompanied Neil Brand in soundtracking Beggars of Life.

==== 2011 ====
Paddy Considine visited Cambridge to present his directorial debut, Tyrannosaur, and the Festival opened in style with a special preview of Tinker Tailor Soldier Spy. In attendance were the director, Tomas Alfredson, screenwriter Peter Straughan, and two of the film's lead actors – Gary Oldman and John Hurt.

==== 2012 ====
This year's centrepiece was season of a dozen Hitchcock films, stretching from his early silents to his peak period in the 50s and early 60s. Five of the most well-known titles – North by Northwest, Vertigo, Psycho, The Birds, and Marnie – were shown in brand new digital prints.

As the Italian director Francesco Rosi celebrated his 90th birthday, the Festival presented a short review of his career.

==== 2013 ====
The 33rd Festival screened Deadcat, which Stefan Georgiou directed. Alongside his filmmaking, Stefan was one of the judges for Short Reel, the Student Filmmaker Award, and the winning film screening as part of the festival each year.

==== 2014 ====
in 2014, the Festival screened digital restorations of some classic 3D, including House of Wax and The Creature from the Black Lagoon.

2014 also saw the launch of Short Reel, an award for student filmmakers in eastern and central England, launched by the Arts Film Club in association with the Cambridge Film Festival.

==== 2015 ====
The 35th Cambridge Film Festival ran from 3–13 September 2016.

Highlights included BBC Arena at 40: Night and Day 24 Hours, a 3-D special event with Brian May, and a BAFTA Kids workshop with Ben Shires and Katie Thistleton.

The Festival's opening films included the premiere of The Kidnapping of Michel Houellebecq.

==== 2016 ====
The 36th Festival opened with I, Daniel Blake with a Q&A with the lead actor Dave Johns.

The Festival collaborated with Cambridge Live to present a specially curated film night celebrating Syd Barrett. The evening included archival music promos and documentaries featuring classic sixties performances and the UK premiere of Get All That Ant?, a free-form documentary made by Barrett's former school friend and fellow art student, Anthony Stern.

A new partnership with the Korean Cultural Centre presented The Handmaiden, Train to Busan, and The Bacchus Lady.

==== 2017 ====
The 37th Film Festival ran from 19 to 26 October. It opened with Battle of the Sexes and closed with Lynne Ramsay's You Were Never Really Here.

==== 2018 ====
The 38th Festival opened on October 25 with The Man Who Killed Don Quixote presented by director Terry Gilliam, who surprised audiences with a Q&A.

==== 2019 ====
The 39th festival saw festival director Tony Jones presented with the inaugural CFF Outstanding Contribution to Cinema Award as he stepped down after more than 30 years.

For the first time, the festival had two opening films: Rocks, presented by director Sarah Gavron and Official Secrets.

Monos, Portrait of a Lady on Fire and The Lighthouse were just some of the highlights, and Castle of Dreams went on to win the Golden Punt Audience Award.

The festival closed with Ken Loach's Sorry We Missed You, and the much anticipated Surprise Films were The Irishman and The Personal History of David Copperfield.

=== The Covid Years! - 2020-2021 ===
==== 2020 ====
As the COVID-19 pandemic took hold and arts organisations looked for ways to survive, Cambridge Film Festival partnered with Cinecity Brighton, Bath Film Festival, and Cornwall Film Festival to present Amplify! a 16-day online film festival, aimed at engaging their collective audiences and supporting filmmakers who had been hit hard by the pandemic.

==== 2021 ====
Following the lifting of the first lockdown in the UK, Cambridge Film Festival could return to its traditional cinema setting, albeit for a pared-back, more focused festival. The 2021 festival opened with Ali and Ava and closed with The Electrical Life of Louis Wain.

=== A second rebirth for CFF - 2022 - Present ===
==== 2022 ====
The 2022 Festival opened with The Banshees of Inisherin and closed 8 days later with The Silent Twins.

==== 2023 ====
The 42nd Cambridge Film Festival ran for a week in October opening with Poor Things and closing with The Royal Hotel (film).

==== 2024 ====
The 43rd Cambridge Film Festival took place in October 2024.

==== 2025 ====
The 44th Cambridge Film Festival returned to its 11 day format running from 23 October to 2 November. The opening film was Bugonia and the festival closed with The Rental Family.

== Film categories and strands ==
The Festival programme is divided up into strands. Some strands reoccur each year, and others are one-off or occasional strands.

Over 50% of the line-up is female-directed, and the festival uses the F-Rating originally championed by the Bath Film Festival.

=== Recurring strands ===
The Family Film Festival - Almost a mini festival within the festival, the family film festival was established in 2010. The strand includes children's films, TV shows and workshops. Previous years have featured films such as The Gruffalo, Frozen (2013) and Monsters University, as well as workshops in slapstick filmmaking and a sneak preview of the 3D restoration of The Lion King in 2011.

Opening and Closing Night Films - High-profile features with special guests.

Gala Screenings - Previews of films and returning home to the big screen

International Festival Highlights - Titles from film festivals across the world.

Camera Catalonia Strand - A recurring strand to showcase Catalan cinema.

Connection and Disconnection - The fluctuation of time, memory and relationships, including thrillers and mysteries of the world.

Short Fusion Strand - A recurring strand that showcases contemporary short films worldwide.

Outstanding Contribution Award - A season of films from the year's award winner.

Surprise Film - Previous Surprise Films included: Up, Pirates of the Caribbean, A Cock and Bull Story, Burn After Reading, Looper, The Personal History of David Copperfield, and Hit the Road.

=== Occasional or one-off strands ===
Contemporary German Strand - Showcasing established and new talent from new German Cinema, including features and shorts.

In Dreams Are Monsters - A horror-focused feast for the senses, celebrating cult classics and contemporary feminist supernatural tales

Resilience - The fight and protests for change during conflicts around the world and challenging stereotypes of different cultures.

A publication or program featuring feature articles, real-life accounts, and analyses of independent cinema.

Creativity on Film - Artistic stories of lockdown theatre, virtual reality, ballet and film preservation.

Japan 2021 - A Window on Contemporary Japanese Cinema, in partnership with the BFI

Nature & Community - Reflecting on the urgency of global warming and climate change.

Liberty - A collection of stories on migration, racism, politics and unity, calling out societal injustice.

Retro 3-D - The 2014 strand showcased the newly digitally restored 3-D classics from the '50s, including The Creature From The Black Lagoon, House of Wax, Inferno, and The Mad Magician.

== Venues ==
The Festival occurs in Cambridge's three-screened Arts Picturehouse, a local arts cinema run by Picturehouse.

In various years since 2005, the Festival has expanded to take in other formal arts venues such as The Light Cinema Cambridge, arts venue The Junction, and Sawston Cinema, as well as interesting non-traditional venues such as pedestrianised Cambridge streets, local churches and the colleges of the university.

During the 2000s, up until 2019, a range of outdoor screenings have been, most notably the Movies on the Meadows screenings at Grantchester Meadows shown on large inflatable screens.

== Movies on the Meadows ==
Movies on the Meadows was a large scale outdoor screening events at Grantchester Meadows, Cambridge.

For nine years (2011–19) it took place over the August bank holiday weekend, in Grantchester. With audiences between 2,000 and 4,000 the event screened films on giant inflatable screens on the banks of the River Cam. Up to four films screened simultaneously each night, and audiences used radio headsets to tune into their preferred film.

The last Movies on the Meadows event was in 2019.
