= Maddalena Crippa =

Italian actress (born 1957)

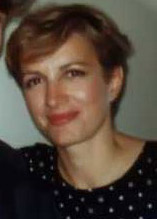
- Born: 4 September 1957 (age 68); Besana in Brianza, Lombardy, Italy
- Occupation: Actress
- Spouse: Peter Stein

Maddalena Crippa (born 4 September 1957) is an Italian film, television and stage actress. She won a David di Donatello for Best Supporting Actress for her role in Academy Awards nominee Three Brothers by Francesco Rosi.

== Life and career ==
Born in Besana in Brianza, Crippa started to act at young age in an amateur dramatics with her father and brothers. At 17 years old, at exams to attend the drama school of the Piccolo Teatro in Milan, the director Giorgio Strehler was impressed by her acting skills and gave her a role in his adaptation of Carlo Goldoni's Il campiello (1975). From then, Crippa started a busy career in theater, working among others with Giancarlo Cobelli, Luca Ronconi and her husband Peter Stein. She is also active in TV-series and in films.

== Miniseries ==
- 1976: La casa nova of Carlo Goldoni, director Luigi Squarzina
- 1976: I due gemelli veneziani of Carlo Goldoni, director Luigi Squarzina
- 1976: Così per gioco, regia di Leonardo Cortese

== Filmography ==
- 1976: Aut aut. Cronaca di una rapina, directed by Silvio Maestranzi
- 1981: Three Brothers, directed by Francesco Rosi
- 1982: No Thanks, Coffee Makes Me Nervous, directed by Lodovico Gasparini
- 1985: Juke Box, directed by Valerio Jalongo
- 1986: Aurelia, directed by Giorgio Molteni
- 1987: L'attrazione, directed by Mario Gariazzo
- 1990: Non più di uno, directed by Roberto Pelosso
- 1993: Berlin '39, directed by Sergio Sollima
- 1998: Giochi d'equilibrio, directed by Amedeo Fago
- 1998: Inspector Rex, episode ... e tutto ricomincia
- 1998: Film, directed by Laura Belli
- 1999: Viol@, directed by Donatella Maiorca
- 2000: Onorevoli detenuti, directed by Giancarlo Planta
- 2003: Household Accounts, directed by Tonino Cervi
- 2008: Appuntamento a ora insolita, directed by Stefano Coletta
- 2011: In carne e ossa, directed by Christian Angeli
- 2016: Io non mi arrendo, directed by Enzo Monteleone
- 2018: Forgive Us Our Debts, directed by Antonio Morabito
- 2019: Lectura Ovidii, directed by Davide Cavuti
- 2021: The Peacock's Paradise, directed by Laura Bispuri
