= Chemical Hunger =

2003 drama film

- Directed by: Antonio Bocola; Paolo Vari
- Screenplay by: Antonio Bocola; Paolo Vari; Cristina Proserpio; Francesco Scarpelli; Gianfilippo Pedote
- Starring: Marco Foschi; Matteo Gianoli; Valeria Solarino
- Cinematography: Mladen Matula
- Edited by: Maurizio Grillo
- Music by: Luca Persico
- Distributed by: Lucky Red
- Release date: 2003
- Language: Italian

Chemical Hunger (Italian: Fame chimica, also known as Chemical Hunger – The Munchies) is a 2003 Italian drama film co-written and directed by Antonio Bocola and Paolo Vari, at their feature film debut. It premiered at the 60th Venice International Film Festival.

== Cast ==
- Marco Foschi as Claudio
- Matteo Gianoli as Manuel
- Valeria Solarino as Maja
- Teco Celio as Claudio's Father
- Mauro Serio as Di Natale
- Mimmo Allanprese as Cuccu
- Giulio Baraldi as Cosimo
- Giancarlo Kalabrugovic as Bifo
- Luca Persico as Zulù

== Production ==
The film was shot in Milan, between Quarto Oggiaro, Barona and Gratosoglio.

== Release ==
The film premiered at the 60th edition of the Venice Film Festival, in the New Territories sidebar.

== Reception ==
The film won the Special Grand Jury Prize and the Audience Award at the Annecy Italian Film Festival. The theme song "Fame chimica" by 'O Zulù was nominated for the David di Donatello for Best Original Song.
