= Gavagai (film) =

2016 Norwegian film

- Directed by: Rob Tregenza
- Screenplay by: Rob Tregenza; Kirk Kjeldsen
- Starring: Andreas Lust; Anna-Kristiina Juuso; Mikkel Gaup
- Edited by: Rob Tregenza
- Music by: Earecka Tregenza-Moody; Jason Moody
- Distributed by: Shadow Distribution
- Release date: October 21, 2016
- Running time: 90 minutes

Gavagai is a 2016 Norwegian drama film directed by Rob Tregenza. The film was acclaimed by critics.

== Reception ==
Gavagai garnered acclaim from film critics. Rotten Tomatoes reports 92% approval among 12 critics, and the film has a 91/100 average on Metacritic. Sheri Linden of The Hollywood Reporter stated that the film's use of poetry "[casts] a fresh light on such familiar movie tropes as the listless traipse of modern-day searchers through overstocked supermarket aisles [...] From morning birdsong to the rustle of leaves in the breeze, from the stutter of stalled car engines to the spare and poignant score, there's nothing extraneous in Gavigai [sic]. As in the best poetry, each image and every sound has the rigor and grace of a well-turned line." Chuck Bowen of Slant Magazine also gave the film a highly positive review and argued, "There’s a little of Terrence Malick in Gavagai’s poetic sensibility, but director and co-writer Rob Tregenza lacks Malick’s precious need to flaunt erudition—to bang us on the head with the existential importance of the proceedings. Tregenza’s characters don’t endlessly and ludicrously twirl into the heavens while muttering sweet nothings; instead, they’re viscerally connected to this Earth and imbued with everyday physicality."

Justin Chang of the Los Angeles Times praised the realism of Gavagai, writing, "Tregenza doesn’t force his two excellent leads to bond or bicker, to arrive at moments of epiphany and catharsis on cue. He knows that even our meaningful encounters with strangers tend to be fleeting ones; he also knows that people are almost always slower to reveal themselves than the movies allow time for." In Film Journal International, Simi Horwitz praised the footage of the Norwegian scenery, stating, "The natural world is almost mystical and takes on the quality of a character, especially in the rainy scenes that mirror the characters’ shed and unshed tears—admittedly a cliché, but visually evocative and emotionally stirring nonetheless.” However, Horwitz criticized the intentional omission of subtitles in scenes containing German or Chinese (rather than Norwegian), as well as the fact that some characters are unnamed.
