= Rob Tregenza =

American cinematographer

Rob Tregenza (born November 14, 1950) is a North American cinematographer, film director, and producer who has worked as a director of photography with Béla Tarr (Werckmeister Harmonies), Claude Miller (Marching Band), Pierre William Glenn (The Sad and Lonely Death of Edgar Allan Poe), and Alex Cox (Three Businessmen).

== Biography ==
A native of Kansas, Tregenza earned his PhD in theater arts from the University of California, Los Angeles in 1982. In the following years, he would continue to make experimental films out of his Sykesville, Maryland studio, financially supporting his work by making advertisements and industrial films with wife and producer J.K. Eareckson. Tregenza eventually made his feature film debut, Talking to Strangers, which premiered in 1988 at the Berlin International Film Festival. Since then, he has produced, directed and photographed five more feature films: The Arc (1991), a co-production with Film Four International, Inside/Out (1997), and Gavagai (2016), The Fishing Place (2025) and FAST (2026).

Jean-Luc Godard met Tregenza and he selected Talking to Strangers to play at the Toronto International Film Festival in 1996 and subsequently helped him make Inside/Out. The film premiered at the 1997 Cannes Film Festival in the Un Certain Regard section. Richard Brody of The New Yorker positively reviewed Inside/Out's "sheer and overt virtuosity and sinuosity of the filmmaking".

In 1999, a retrospective of his feature films was shown at the National Gallery of Art in Washington, D.C.

In 2023, a retrospective of his feature films was screened at The Museum of Modern Art, MoMA, April 12-16. https://www.moma.org/calendar/film/5571

Tregenza's fourth feature film, Gavagai (2016) was shot in 35mm, in Telemark, Norway. It stars Andreas Lust, Anni-Kristiina Juuso, and Mikkel Gaup and was based on 15 poems by Tarjei Vesaas. The film was distributed theatrically in North America by Shadow Distribution and was sixth in Metacritic's list of the best-reviewed feature films distributed in 2018.

Tregenza's fifth feature film, The Fishing Place (2024) was shot in 35mm, in Telemark, Norway. It stars Ellen Dorrit Petersen, Andreas Lust, and Frode Winther.

Tregenza's sixth feature film, FAST (2026), was shot in 35mm, in Lexington and Richmond, Virginia. It stars Madison Pankey, Mia Grichendler, Nicholas X Parsons, Jeff Wincott and Suzi Haines. FAST is planned to premiere at MoMA August 12-18th, 2026.

https://thefilmstage.com/rob-tregenza-travels-the-phantom-road-in-exclusive-trailer-for-fast/

== Cinematic technique ==
Tregenza's work often employs the use of long takes to create mise en scene. His cinematic inspirations include the works of Michelangelo Antonioni, Kenji Mizoguchi, & Jean-Luc Godard.
