= Policemen (film) =

- Directed by: Giulio Base
- Produced by: Claudio Bonivento
- Cinematography: Dante Dalla Torre
- Music by: Oscar Prudente
- Release date: 1995
- Country: Italy
- Language: Italian

Policemen (Italian: Poliziotti [poliˈtsјɔtti]) is a 1995 Italian crime-drama film directed by Giulio Base.

== Cast ==
- Claudio Amendola: Lorenzo Ferri, aka "Lazzaro"
- Kim Rossi Stuart: Andrea
- Michele Placido: Sante Carella
- Roberto Citran: Guido
- Nadia Farès: Stella
- Luigi Diberti: Berardi
- Fulvio Milani: Aureli
- Stefania Rocca: Valeria
