= Donatella Maiorca =

Italian film director (born 1957)

- Born: September 13, 1957 (age 68); Messina, Sicily
- Occupations: Film director, television director, screenwriter
- Years active: 1996–present
- Notable work: Purple Sea

Donatella Maiorca (born September 13, 1957, in Messina) is an Italian film director.

== Career ==
Donatella Maiorca began working as an actress and assistant director while she was a student of psychology at the Sapienza University of Rome. In 1981 she worked as an assistant director for Luciano Odorisio, and she eventually got to work on the sets of some cinematic films like Odd Squad (1981), directed by E.B. Clucher, and Big Deal After 20 Years (1985), directed by Amanzio Todini. In 1996 she debuted as director, making a documentary for Rai 3. Two years later came her cinematic debut: Viol@, with Stefania Rocca. Maiorca also garnered nominations for the Golden Globes and Nastro d'Argento for Best New Director.

In the following years Maiorca handled the directing of some episodes of television programs for RAI, like Giornalisti (Journalists) in 2000 and La stagione dei delitti (Crime Season) in 2007. She also directed eleven various episodes of the soap opera Un Posto al Sole (A Place in the Sun), and over seventy episodes of La squadra (The Squad) and La nuova squadra (The New Squad).

In 2009 Maiorca directed the film Viola di mare ('Sea Violet' or 'Purple Sea') with Isabella Ragonese and Valeria Solarino, a love story between two women set in 19th-century Sicily. The film won for Maiorca the Città di Firenze Award at the New Italian Cinema Events international film festival of 2009–2010, bringing her film onto American, Dutch, and Russian screens. Valeria Solarino won the Susan Batson Award. At the International Gay and Lesbian Film Festival of Bilbao in 2011, Valeria Solarino won the award for best actress and Isabella Ragonese received special mention. Viola di mare was nominated for the Marc'Aurelio d'Oro for best film at the Rome Film Festival.

== Filmography ==
- Viol@ (1998)
- Viola di mare (2009)

== See also ==
- List of female film and television directors
- List of LGBT-related films directed by women
