= Forgive Us Our Debts =

2018 film directed by Antonio Morabito

- Directed by: Antonio Morabito
- Written by: Antonio Morabito; Amedeo Pagani
- Starring: Claudio Santamaria; Marco Giallini; Jerzy Stuhr
- Cinematography: Duccio Cimatti
- Music by: Andrea Guerra
- Production company: Netflix
- Distributed by: Netflix
- Release date: May 4, 2018 (Italy)
- Running time: 104 minutes
- Country: Italy
- Language: Italian
- Budget: €2,000,000 (estimated)

Forgive Us Our Debts (Italian: Rimetti a noi i nostri debiti) is a 2018 Italian drama film about a man struggling under the crushing weight of debt who has to work as a debt collector to pay off his creditors. The film was released on May 4, 2018, by Netflix.

== Synopsis ==
A newly unemployed man struggling under the weight of debt starts working as a debt collector. Although he intends to repay his creditors, he soon discovers the deal is unexpectedly costly.

== Plot ==
Guido lives alone in a decrepit apartment in suburban Rome. His only friend is his neighbour, an eccentric university professor who rambles about politics over snooker. Recently retrenched from his technician post after the IT company he works for filed for bankruptcy, Guido finds a blue-collar job as a warehouse forklift operator, but is promptly fired for his ineptitude. He spends his days drinking at the local bar and harbours an unspoken affection for the waitress, an Albanian immigrant named Rina.

One night, Guido is beaten up by a hired thug for owing money to his creditors. Deeply in debt and four months behind on rent, Guido goes to the credit company and asks to work for them without pay as a means of settling his dues. Reluctantly, the manager teams him up with Franco, a senior agent in the company's debt recovery department.

Franco takes Guido under his wing, showing him how to harass debtors into repaying their loans. He impresses Guido with ostentatious displays of money, such as offering a generous tip to a waitress at a self-service restaurant to break the rules and bring them some food. He also demonstrates the power that he has over bad debtors, writing off their loans in exchange for personal property of sentimental value.

Now with some means, Guido's self-confidence is renewed. He frequents upper-class bars with Franco and takes revenge on his former boss at his warehouse. Despite this, Guido has doubts about the morality of his job, such as the night Franco encouraged him to beat up a debtor in the same way he had been attacked before.

One evening Guido asks Rina out to dinner at a fancy restaurant. However, dinner service had already ended for the night. Emulating Franco's earlier behaviour, Guido hands a large tip to the waiter to bring them food, but the waiter is offended and ignores him. Unimpressed, Rina thinks Guido is vulgar, and leaves.

As Franco and Guido are going about their rounds, one of the debtors commits suicide by jumping down a stairwell in front of their eyes. Guido is traumatised and tearfully confesses to Rina about the nature of his job.

Awaiting another debtor at a cemetery, Guido is surprised to see that it turns out to be his old friend, the professor. Guido and Franco argue and Guido begs Franco to cancel the professor's debt just as he had done for others. Franco angrily does so, reminding Guido that writing off debts costs him money, and they part ways.

Guido returns to the bar and finds out that Rina has left the city, ostensibly in search of a better life as they had discussed earlier. Franco confesses his sins at a local church, and recites the Pater Noster, which includes the lines "Forgive us our debts, as we forgive our debtors".

== Production notes ==
In the cemetery where Guido and Franco have an argument, a gravestone can be seen with the name "Pavel Ivanovič Čičikov" (as rendered in the Italian transliteration of Russian names). This is a homage to the main character in Nikolai Gogol's novel Dead Souls, which the film is loosely based on. Just as Chichikov buys dead serfs to relieve their owners of a tax burden, Franco writes off the loans of people whose debts he deems irrecoverable, also referring to them as "dead". The portrait on the tombstone is Gogol's, and the years 1809–1852 are his birth and death dates.

== Cast ==
- Claudio Santamaria as Guido
- Marco Giallini as Franco
- Jerzy Stuhr as Professore
- Flonja Kodheli as Rina
- Agnieszka Zulewska as Dorota
- Leonardo Nigro as Fantinari
- Maddalena Crippa as Funzionaria
- Giorgio Gobbi as Capo magazziniere
- Paolo De Vita as Sig. Rinaldi
- Paola Lavini as Sig.ra Rinaldi
- Liliana Massari as Simona Lorace
- Pietro Naglieri as Caprera
- Vincenzo Tanassi as Padrone di casa
- Xhilda Lapardhaja as Segretaria Candy
- Giovanni Galati as Cosimo
