= Sacha Bourdo =

Russian actor

Aleksander "Sacha" Burdo (born 8 January 1962 in Oryol, Russia) is a Russian actor. He has appeared in films including The Science of Sleep (2006) by Michel Gondry and Western (1997) by Manuel Poirier. He also starred in L'étoile du soldat in 2006, earning acclaim for his portrayal of a Russian conscript in the Soviet Afghanistan war.
