= Talking to Strangers (film) =

1988 film

- Film poster
- Directed by: Rob Tregenza
- Written by: Rob Tregenza
- Produced by: J.K. Eareckson
- Starring: Ken Gruz
- Cinematography: Rob Tregenza
- Release date: February 1988
- Running time: 90 minutes
- Country: United States
- Language: English

Talking to Strangers is a 1988 American drama film directed by Rob Tregenza. It marked Tregenza's debut as a feature-length film director, screenwriter and cinematographer. It is composed of nine scenes, each one filmed only once and presented as an uninterrupted ten-minute take. Except for the first and last scenes, the remaining seven were arranged in a random order chosen by Tregenza's computer.

The film was shot in widescreen 35 mm and mixed in Dolby Stereo sound. It was made on location in Baltimore, Maryland where Tregenza and his wife and producer, J.K. Eareckson, were already established as artists and industrial filmmakers, creating advertisements and corporate films to financially support their work in experimental filmmaking.

== Plot ==
An aspiring writer works at odd jobs and wanders through a city as he looks for inspiration. Over the course of a day, he has nine distinct encounters with different strangers. They range from a Catholic priest he corners for a philosophical discussion in the confessional to a disturbing episode with a nihilistic thug who has commandeered a city bus.

== Cast ==
- Ken Gruz - Jesse
- Dennis Jordan - Red Coat
- Marvin Hunter - General
- Caron Tate - Ms. Taylor
- Henry Strozier - Priest
- Richard Foster - Slick
- Sarah Rush - Potter
- Linda Caryl Chambers - Trigger

== Reception ==
The film was not offered commercial distribution when it first appeared in 1988, screening primarily at film festivals such as the Berlin International Film Festival and one-off screenings at local arthouse theaters. It eventually received a proper theatrical release in the U.S. on December 27, 1991 when it played for a week at the Film Society of Lincoln Center in New York City.

Jonathan Rosenbaum of The Chicago Reader was an early champion of the film, writing that "each sequence was shot only once, so the possibility of accident and error hovers over every moment suspensefully, as in a jazz improvisation. The virtuoso camera movements and stereo sound lead to gradual and unpredictable expositions of physical space; the variety of acting styles creates a feeling of perpetual uncertainty about the registers of reality underlying each sequence...Alternately comic, disturbing, challenging, and demanding, this is a galvanizing, high-level game for adventurous spectators, and a truly remarkable first feature."

Dave Kehr of The Chicago Tribune singled out the film when he covered the Berlin International Film Festival in February 1988, writing that it was "an astounding formal tour de force and a film of remarkable and often troubling emotional density...It's rare to encounter a film with such a strong commitment to its characters and situations that also manages to maintain a powerful theoretical thrust in its thinking and rethinking of film style. It isn't an easy film to take, but movies that break new ground seldom are."

Later in the year, Kehr wrote a full-length review for the Tribune, writing that "Tregenza has accomplished an astonishing thing [blending] the kind of formal experimentation associated with directors on the farthest fringe of the avant-garde (Michael Snow, Jean-Luc Godard, Jean-Marie Straub) with a genuine interest in drama and character. It is a narrative film, but it builds its narrative in a new and provocative way...It's a confrontational film, sometimes off-putting and even deliberately irritating, that prefers to win the viewer with its wit, inventiveness and unshakable integrity." Regarding the film's one-take aesthetic, Kehr noted that "if even one shot goes wrong, the movie is ruined (and Tregenza does have a few heart-stoppingly close calls)."

Jean-Luc Godard would personally select Talking to Strangers to screen at the Toronto International Film Festival in 1996, praising Tregenza's work as "remarkable and at times astonishing” with “reality [walking] hand in hand with fiction.”

Richard Brody of The New Yorker would also praise the film years later, comparing it to the films of "Max Ophüls, whose lyrically vertiginous mastery of the track and the crane is also rhapsodic, also bittersweet — but profoundly, scathingly worldly. Tregenza is a sort of counter-Ophüls: a rhapsodist of the unworldly, whose lyricism depicts a young man of another world whose confrontations with the one at hand give his ideals a pummelling without, for a second, dispelling them, and whose ultimate fulfillment arrives in a sort of transcendent visual nothingness, an ideal image that’s the repudiation of images. Tregenza is after lyricism without cynicism, bitterness and sweetness without bittersweetness, emotions unmixed and irony-free."
