= Land of Saints =

- Directed by: Fernando Muraca
- Written by: Fernando Muraca; Monica Zapelli
- Starring: Valeria Solarino; Lorenza Indovina; Daniela Marra; Ninni Bruschetta
- Cinematography: Federico Annicchiarico
- Music by: Valerio Vigliar
- Release date: March 26, 2015
- Running time: 80 minutes
- Language: Italian

Land of Saints (Italian: La terra dei santi) is a 2015 Italian crime-thriller film written and directed by Fernando Muraca and starring Valeria Solarino. It was shot in Apulia, between Deliceto, Foggia and Gallipoli. It won the Special Jury Prize at the Annecy Film Festival.

== Cast ==
- Valeria Solarino as Vittoria
- Lorenza Indovina as Caterina
- Daniela Marra as Assunta
- Ninni Bruschetta as Domenico Mercuri
- Tommaso Ragno as Alfredo Raso
- Marco Aiello as Pasquale Raso
- Piero Calabrese as Giuseppe
- Giuseppe Vitale as L'avvocato
- Francesco Colella as Nando Caligiuri

== See also ==
- List of Italian films of 2015
