= Miss F =

2007 film by Wilma Labate

- Directed by: Wilma Labate
- Written by: Wilma Labate; Francesca Marciano; Carla Vangelista
- Starring: Filippo Timi; Valeria Solarino; Sabrina Impacciatore; Fausto Paravidino; Rosa Pianeta; Giorgio Colangeli; Fabrizio Gifuni
- Cinematography: Fabio Zamarion
- Music by: Pasquale Catalano
- Distributed by: 01 Distribution
- Release date: 2007
- Country: Italy
- Language: Italian

Miss F (Italian: Signorina Effe) is a 2007 Italian drama film directed by Wilma Labate. A portrait of workers' life in Fiat's system, it entered the "Italian Panorama" section at the 2007 Turin Film Festival.

== Cast ==
- Filippo Timi: Sergio
- Valeria Solarino: Emma
- Sabrina Impacciatore: Magda
- Fausto Paravidino: Antonio
- Gaetano Bruno: Peppino
- Giorgio Colangeli: Ciro
- Fabrizio Gifuni: Silvio
- Clara Bindi: Nonna Martano

== See also ==
- List of Italian films of 2007
