= Film: The Living Record of Our Memory =

Film: The Living Record of Our Memory is a 2021 documentary film which explores film preservation.

The film received an Audience Award for Best Documentary Feature at the 2021 Cambridge Film Festival.
