= Clara Bindi =

Italian actress (1927–2022)

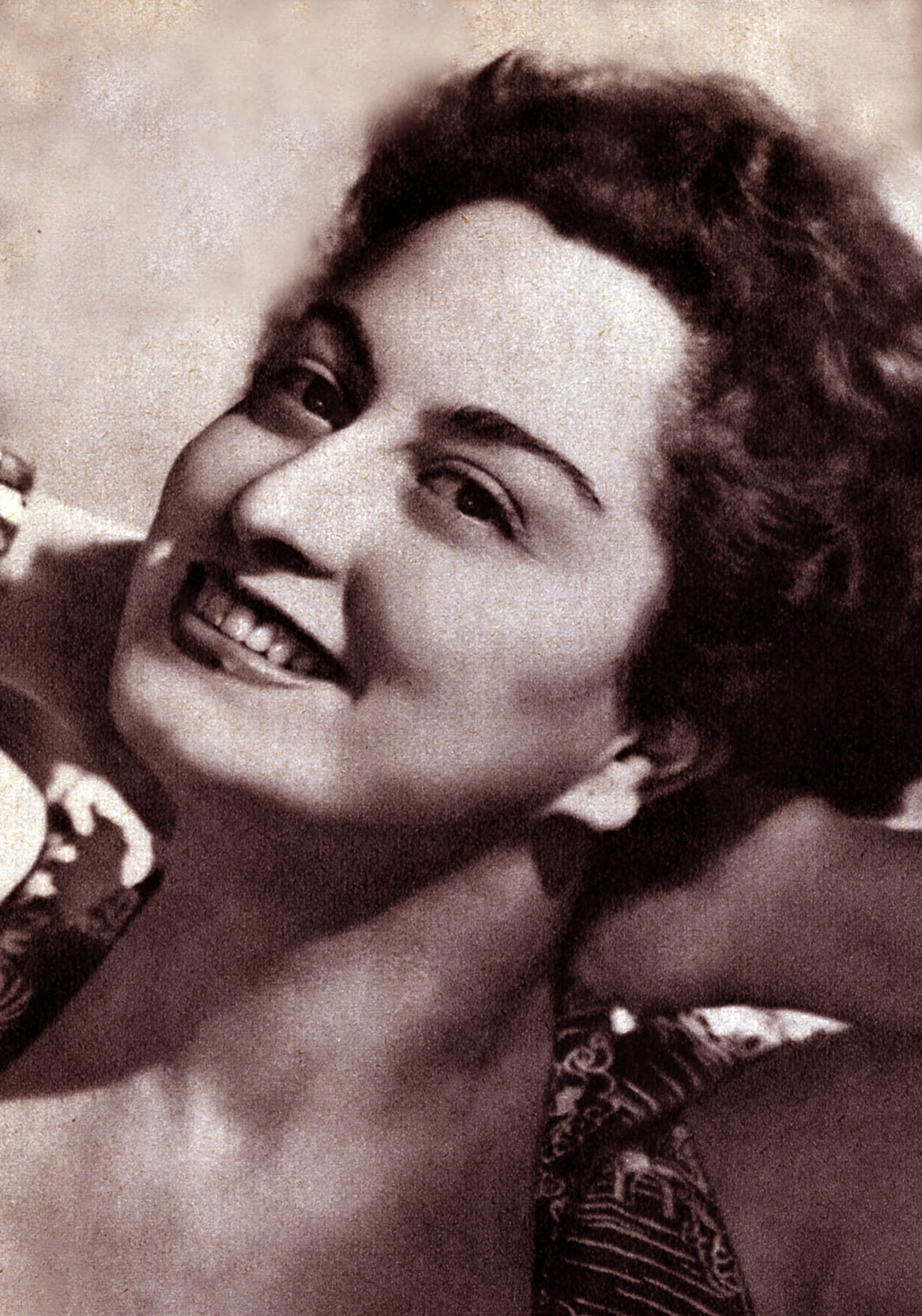
- Bindi in 1952
- Born: 1 November 1927; Naples, Kingdom of Italy
- Died: 24 February 2022 (aged 94); Rome, Italy
- Occupation: Actress
- Years active: 1948–2013 (film)
- Spouse: Aldo Bufi Landi

Clara Bindi (1 November 1927 – 24 February 2022) was an Italian actress.

== Biography ==
Born in Naples on 1 November 1927, Bindi joined the Eduardo De Filippo theater company in the 1947–48 season and in 1948 made her film debut as Giulietta Del Bello in Machine to Kill Bad People, directed by Roberto Rossellini. (Note: Filmed in 1948 but not released until 1952) She was a member of the De Filippo company for several years, even appearing in numerous television adaptations of his plays.

Bindi was in over fifty films between 1948 and 2013 and is best known for her work in the films, Black Sunday (1960), The Family Friend (2006), and Miss F (2007). Starting from the 1990s, she specialized in roles of mother and grandmother. Outside her film and television appearances, Bindi was essentially a revue and dialect theater actress. She was also active as a voice actress and a dubber.

Described as full of temperament and highly communicative, she was married to actor Aldo Bufi Landi, with whom she often worked on stage.

Bindi died in Rome on 24 February 2022, at the age of 94.

== Selected filmography ==
Year	Title	Role
1952	The Machine to Kill Bad People	Giulietta Del Bello
1958	Avventura a Capri	Carmelina
1960	Black Sunday	innkeeper
1963	The Monk of Monza	
1966	Fumo di Londra	wife
1968	Bandits in Rome	woman in jewels
1970	Ma chi t'ha dato la patente?	
2006	The Family Friend	Geremia's mother
2007	Miss F	Grandmother Martano
2008	Villa Amalia	Marion
