= Valeria Solarino =

Italian actress

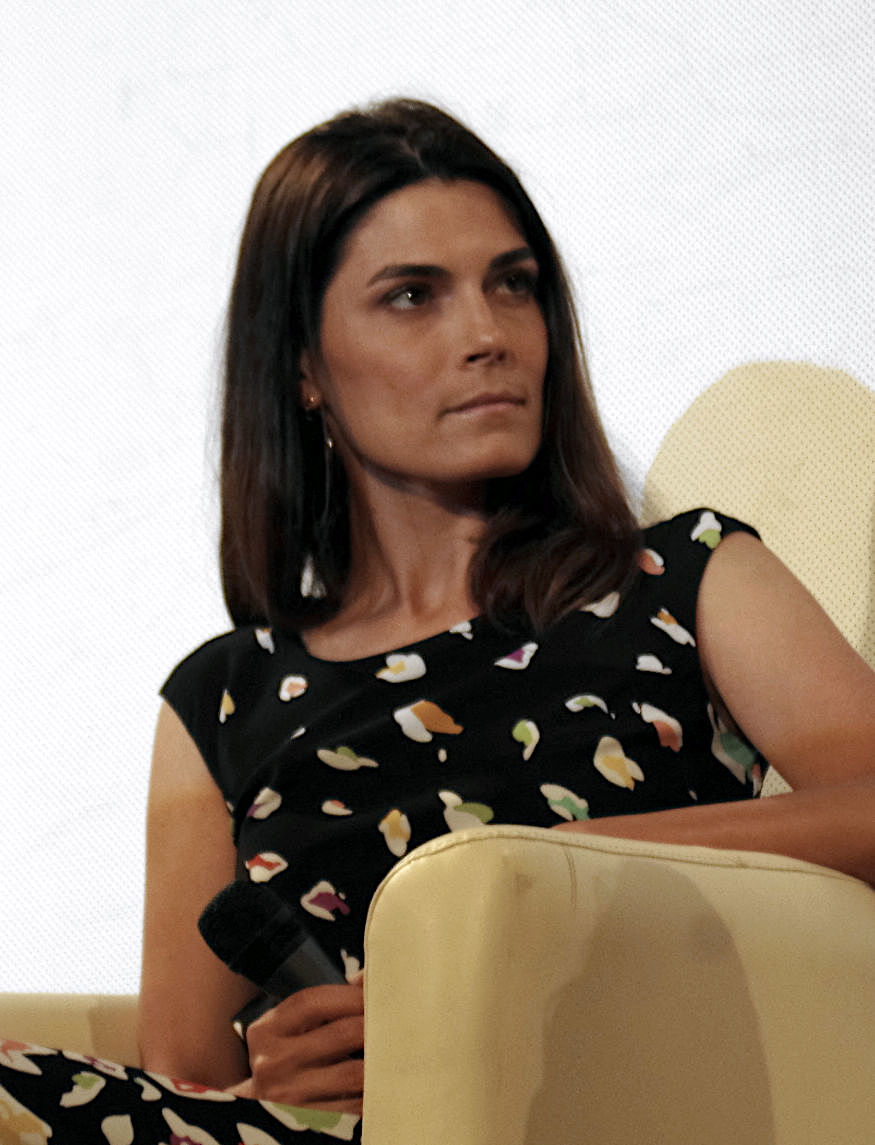
- Solarino in 2014
- Born: 4 November 1979 (age 46); El Morro de Barcelona, Venezuela
- Occupation: Actress
- Years active: 2003 – present

Valeria Solarino (born 4 November 1978) is an Italian actress.

== Life and career ==
Solarino was born in Barcelona, Venezuela to a Sicilian father and Turinese mother. After enrolling in philosophy at the University of Turin, she left her studies to attend the drama school of the Teatro Stabile di Torino.

After being chosen by director Mimmo Calopresti for a small role in Happiness Costs Nothing, her career took momentum, first with a major role in Chemical Hunger by Paolo Vari and Antonio Bocola, and then with the breakout performance as Bea in What Will Happen to Us by Giovanni Veronesi.

In 2007, Solarino was awarded the Pasinetti Award for Best Actress at the 64th Venice International Film Festival for her performance in Salvatore Maira's Waltz. In 2008, she received a David di Donatello nomination for Best Actress for Wilma Labate's Miss F. In 2010, she got a Nastro d'Argento nomination for Best Actress for Purple Sea by Donatella Maiorca.

== Selected filmography ==
- Happiness Costs Nothing (2003)
- Chemical Hunger (2003)
- What Will Happen to Us (2003)
- The Fever (2005)
- Secret Journey (2006)
- Manual of Love 2 (2007) )
- Miss F (2007)
- Italians (2009)
- Purple Sea (2009)
- Parents and Children: Shake Well Before Using (2010)
- Angel of Evil (2010)
- The Ages of Love (2011)
- Anita Garibaldi (2012)
- I Can Quit Whenever I Want (2014)
- A Woman as a Friend (2014)
- Land of Saints (2015)
- Era d'estate (2016)
- I Can Quit Whenever I Want: Masterclass (2017)
- I Can Quit Whenever I Want: Ad Honorem (2017)
- There's No Place Like Home (2018)
- As Needed (2018)
- The King's Musketeers (2018)
- On Our Watch (2021)
