= Viol@ =

- Directed by: Donatella Maiorca
- Cinematography: Marcello Montarsi
- Release date: 1998
- Language: Italian

Viol@ is a 1998 Italian erotic drama film directed by Donatella Maiorca.

== Plot ==
Marta, behind the nickname "Viol@", decided to experience the thrill of virtual sex. Her interlocutor, a mysterious man named Mittler, seems to be able to please her to the point of being able to maneuver her in all respects in real life, away from the computer.

Marta then starts to live at the mercy of the mysterious caller losing her job and her social relations. After her dog Oliver dies as a result of her irresponsibility, the woman decides to break free from the trap and to find out who Mittler is.

== Cast ==
- Stefania Rocca as Marta
- Stefano Rota as Lorenzo
- Rosanna Mortara as Laura
- Rolando Ravello as Chief
- Ennio Fantastichini as Mittler (voice)
- Neri Marcorè as Interviewee
- Maddalena Crippa as Mittler's mother
