= Inside/Out (1997 film) =

1997 American film by Rob Tregenza

- Film poster
- Directed by: Rob Tregenza
- Written by: Rob Tregenza
- Produced by: J. K. Eareckson; Tom Garvin
- Starring: Stefania Rocca
- Cinematography: Rob Tregenza
- Edited by: Rob Tregenza
- Music by: J. K. Eareckson; Rob Tregenza
- Distributed by: Cinema Parallel
- Release date: May 1997
- Running time: 115 minutes
- Country: United States
- Language: English

Inside/Out is a 1997 American independent drama film written, directed, photographed, and edited by Rob Tregenza. It was screened in the Un Certain Regard section at the 1997 Cannes Film Festival. It stars Stefania Rocca, Frédéric Pierrot, Bérangère Allaux, and Mikkel Gaup, and runs 115 minutes.

Inside/Out is an austere, black‑and‑white chamber piece set in and around a mid‑century American psychiatric hospital. With sparse dialogue and long takes, Tregenza uses the setting to explore themes of captivity and freedom, time and memory, and the fragile bonds between patients and authority figures. The film is best known for its Cannes selection and for Tregenza's formal approach to staging and camera movement.

== Plot summary ==
French artist Jean Hammett is an inpatient at a small American psychiatric hospital, where time seems to slip and stall. Monique Phillips, a young woman who rejects her American roots, attempts an escape from a larger institution but is caught and transferred to Jean's hospital. Monique becomes fixated on Jean, seeing in him a symbol of freedom and possibility. Their tenuous connection unfolds amid an institutional routine of medication lines, supervised walks, and chapel services.

Meanwhile, guard Eric Johnson reads Monique's obsession as deepening madness, tightening control over patients as breakouts are attempted and foiled. Jean befriends Roger Freeman, a former jazz musician and fellow patient whose faded past hints at a broader life beyond the ward.

Episodic sequences—patients drifting through wintry grounds, a wordless dance, a sermon in a bare chapel—accumulate into a portrait of the institution's emotional climate rather than a conventional plot resolution.

== Cast ==
- Stefania Rocca - Grace Patterson
- Frédéric Pierrot - Jean Hammett
- Bérangère Allaux - Monique Phillips
- Mikkel Gaup - Eric Johnson
- Steven Anthony Watkins - Roger Freeman (as Steven Watkins)
- Tom Gilroy - David Sheppard
- David Roland Frank - Young Orderly
