= 1997 Cannes Film Festival =

- Official poster of the 50th Cannes Film Festival
- Opening film: The Fifth Element
- Closing film: Absolute Power
- Location: Cannes, France
- Founded: 1946
- Awards: Palme d'Or: Taste of Cherry; The Eel
- Hosted by: Jeanne Moreau
- No. of films: 20 (In Competition)
- Festival date: 7 May 1997 – 18 May 1997
- Website: festival-cannes.com/en

Cannes Film Festival
- 1998 1996

The 50th Cannes Film Festival took place from 7 to 18 May 1997. French actress Isabelle Adjani served as jury president for the main competition. Jeanne Moreau hosted the opening and closing ceremonies.

The Palme d'Or was jointly awarded to Iranian filmmaker Abbas Kiarostami for the drama film Taste of Cherry and to Japanese filmmaker Shōhei Imamura for the drama film The Eel.

The festival opened with The Fifth Element by Luc Besson, and closed with Absolute Power by Clint Eastwood.

1997 Un Certain Regard poster, adapted from an original illustration by Milo Manara.

== Juries ==
=== Main competition ===
- Isabelle Adjani, French actress - Jury President
- Paul Auster, American filmmaker
- Luc Bondy, Swiss director
- Tim Burton, American filmmaker
- Patrick Dupond, French dancer and artistic director
- Gong Li, Chinese actress
- Mike Leigh, British filmmaker
- Nanni Moretti, Italian filmmaker
- Michael Ondaatje, Canadian author
- Mira Sorvino, American actress

=== Caméra d'Or ===
- Françoise Arnol, French actress - Jury President
- Luciano Barisone, Italian film critic
- Olivier Brunet-Lefebvre, French cinephile
- Julien Camy, French cinephile
- Ulrich Gregor, German cinema historian
- Gérard Lenne, French film critic
- Jiří Menzel, Czech filmmaker
- Nicolas Philibert, French filmmaker

== Official selection ==
=== In Competition ===
The following feature films competed for the Palme d'Or:

English title	Original title	Director(s)	Production country
Assassin(s)		Mathieu Kassovitz	France
The Banned Woman	La femme défendue	Philippe Harel	France
The Brave		Johnny Depp	United States
The Eel	うなぎ	Shōhei Imamura	Japan
The End of Violence		Wim Wenders	United States
Funny Games		Michael Haneke	Austria
Happy Together	春光乍洩	Wong Kar-wai	Hong Kong
The Ice Storm		Ang Lee	United States
Kini and Adams		Idrissa Ouédraogo	Burkina Faso, France
L.A. Confidential		Curtis Hanson	United States
Nil by Mouth		Gary Oldman	United Kingdom, France
The Prince of Homburg	Il principe di Homburg	Marco Bellocchio	Italy
The Serpent's Kiss		Philippe Rousselot	United Kingdom
She's So Lovely		Nick Cassavetes	United States
The Sweet Hereafter		Atom Egoyan	Canada
Taste of Cherry	طعم گیلاس...	Abbas Kiarostami	Iran
The Truce	La tregua	Francesco Rosi	Italy
Welcome to Sarajevo		Michael Winterbottom	United Kingdom, United States
The Well		Samantha Lang	Australia
Western		Manuel Poirier	France

=== Un Certain Regard ===
The following films were selected for the Un Certain Regard section:

English title	Original title	Director(s)	Production country
12 Storeys	十二樓	Eric Khoo	Singapore
A, B, C... Manhattan		Amir Naderi	United States
After Sex	Post Coïtum, Animal Triste	Brigitte Roüan	France
American Perfekt		Paul Chart	United States
Brother	Брат	Aleksei Balabanov	Russia
La cruz		Alejandro Agresti	Argentina
East Palace, West Palace	东宫西宫	Zhang Yuan	China
Gudia		Gautam Ghose	India
Histoire(s) du cinéma		Jean-Luc Godard	France, Switzerland
The House	Namai	Šarūnas Bartas	Lithuania, France
In the Company of Men		Neil LaBute	United States
Inside/Out		Rob Tregenza	United States
Journey on a Clock Hand	Akrebin Yolculuğu	Ömer Kavur	Turkey
Love and Death on Long Island		Richard Kwietniowski	United Kingdom, Canada
Lucky Star	La buena estrella	Ricardo Franco	Spain, France, Italy
Marcello Mastroianni: I Remember	Marcello Mastroianni: mi ricordo, sì, io mi ricordo	Anna Maria Tatò	Italy
Marius and Jeannette	Marius et Jeannette	Robert Guédiguian	France
Mrs Brown		John Madden	United Kingdom
Private Confessions	Enskilda samtal	Liv Ullmann	Sweden
Sunday		Jonathan Nossiter	United States
Wind Echoing in My Being	내 안에 우는 바람	Jeon Soo-il	South Korea
The Witman Boys	Witman fiúk	János Szász	Hungary

=== Out of Competition ===
The following films were selected to be screened out of competition:

English title	Original title	Director(s)	Production country
Absolute Power (closing film)		Clint Eastwood	United States
The Blackout		Abel Ferrara	United States
Destiny	المصير	Youssef Chahine	Egypt, France
The Fifth Element (opening film)	Le Cinquième Élément	Luc Besson	France
Hamlet		Kenneth Branagh	United Kingdom, United States
Michael Jackson's Ghosts (short)		Stan Winston	United States
Nirvana		Gabriele Salvatores	Italy
Voyage to the Beginning of the World	Viagem ao Princípio do Mundo	Manoel de Oliveira	France, Portugal
Welcome to Woop Woop		Stephan Elliott	Australia

=== Short Films Competition ===
The following short films competed for the Short Film Palme d'Or:

- Le Bon Endroit by Ayelet Bargur
- Camera obscura by Stefano Arduino
- Final Cut by Justin Case
- ...Is It the Design on the Wrapper? (Est-ce à cause du dessin sur l'emballage?) by Tessa Sheridan
- Joe by Sasha Wolf
- Leonie by Lieven Debrauwer
- Over The Rainbow by Alexandre Aja
- Les Vacances by Emmanuelle Bercot

== Parallel sections ==
=== International Critics' Week ===
The following films were screened for the 36th International Critics' Week (36e Semaine de la Critique):

Feature film competition

- Junk Mail (Budbringeren) by Pål Sletaune (Norway)
- Mother of the Dunes (Faraw !) by Abdoulaye Ascofaré (Mali)
- This World, Then the Fireworks by Michael Oblowitz (United States)
- Le Mani forti by Franco Bernini (Italy)
- Character (Karakter) by Mike van Diem (Netherlands)
- Bent by Sean Mathias (United Kingdom)
- Insomnia by Erik Skjoldbjærg (Norway)

Short film competition

- The Signalman (Le Signaleur) by Benoît Mariage (Belgium)
- Marylou by Todd Kurtzman & Danny Shorago (United States)
- Adios Mama by Ariel Gordon (Mexico)
- Tunnel of Love by Robert Milton Wallace (United Kingdom)
- Muerto de amor by Ramón Barea (Spain)
- O Prego by João Maia (Portugal)
- Le Voleur de diagonale by Jean Darrigol (France)

=== Directors' Fortnight ===
The following films were screened for the 1997 Directors' Fortnight (Quinzaine des Réalizateurs):

- Buud-Yam by Gaston Kaboré
- Cosmos by André Turpin, Arto Paragamian, Denis Villeneuve, Jennifer Alleyn, Manon Briand, Marie-Julie Dallaire
- Dakan by Mohamed Camara
- Hamam by Ferzan Ozpetek
- I Hate Love (J'ai horreur de l'amour) by Laurence Ferreira Barbosa
- Kicked In The Head by Matthew Harrison
- Kissed by Lynne Stopkewich
- L'autre côté de la mer by Dominique Cabrera
- The Good Life (La buena vida) by David Trueba
- La Vie de Jésus by Bruno Dumont
- Ma 6-T va crack-er by Jean-François Richet
- Ma vie en rose by Alain Berliner
- Murmur of Youth by Lin Cheng-sheng
- The Perfect Circle (Savrseni Krug) by Ademir Kenović
- The Power of the Skirt (Taafe Fanga) by Adama Drabo
- A Friend of the Deceased by Viacheslav Kryshtofovych
- Sinon, oui by Claire Simon
- My Son the Fanatic by Udayan Prasad
- Suzaku by Naomi Kawase
- Train of Shadows (Tren de sombras) by José Luis Guerin
- Un frère... by Sylvie Verheyde

Short films

- Liberté chérie by Jean-Luc Gaget
- Soyons amis ! by Thomas Bardinet
- Taxi de nuit by Marco Castilla
- Tout doit disparaître by Jean-Marc Moutout
- Y’a du foutage dans l’air by Djamel Bensalah

== Official Awards ==
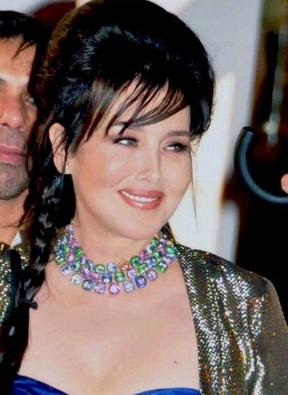
Isabelle Adjani, Jury President

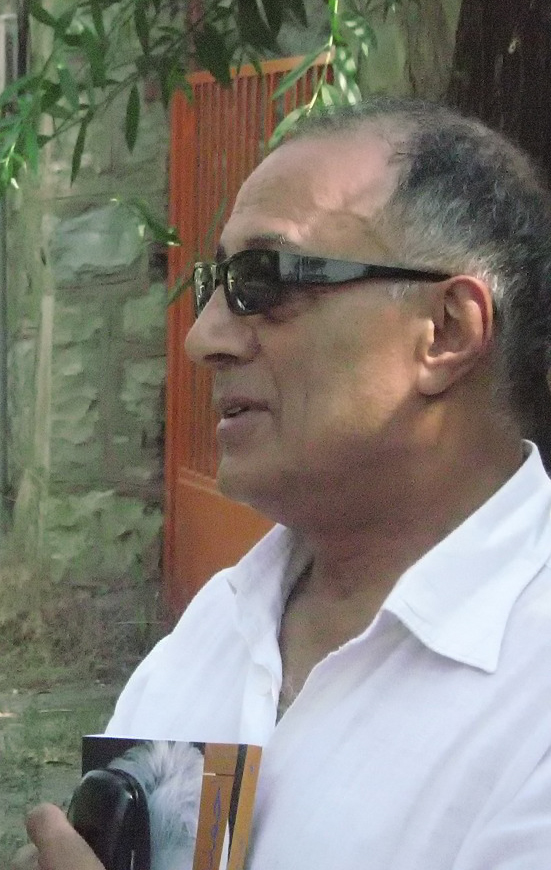
Abbas Kiarostami, Palme d'Or winner

=== In Competition ===
- Palme d'Or:
  - Taste of Cherry by Abbas Kiarostami
  - The Eel by Shōhei Imamura
- Grand Prize of the Jury: The Sweet Hereafter by Atom Egoyan
- Best Director: Wong Kar-wai for Happy Together
- Best Screenplay: The Ice Storm by James Schamus
- Best Actress: Kathy Burke for Nil by Mouth
- Best Actor: Sean Penn for She's So Lovely
- Jury Prize: Western by Manuel Poirier
- 50th Anniversary Prize: Youssef Chahine (Lifetime Achievement Award)
- Palm of the Palms: Ingmar Bergman

=== Caméra d'Or ===
- Suzaku by Naomi Kawase
  - Special Mention: La Vie de Jésus by Bruno Dumont

=== Short Film Palme d'Or ===
- ...Is It the Design on the Wrapper? by Tessa Sheridan
- Jury Prize:
  - Leonie by Lieven Debrauwer
  - Les Vacances by Emmanuelle Bercot

== Independent Awards ==
=== FIPRESCI Prizes ===
- The Sweet Hereafter by Atom Egoyan (In competition)
- Voyage to the Beginning of the World by Manoel de Oliveira (Out of competition)

=== Commission Supérieure Technique ===
- Technical Grand Prize: Thierry Arbogast (cinematography) in She's So Lovely and The Fifth Element

=== Prize of the Ecumenical Jury ===
- The Sweet Hereafter by Atom Egoyan
  - Special Mention:
    - Lucky Star by Ricardo Franco
    - Voyage to the Beginning of the World by Manoel de Oliveira

=== Award of the Youth ===
- Foreign Film: Bent by Sean Mathias
- French Film: I Hate Love by Laurence Ferreira Barbosa

=== International Critics' Week ===
- Mercedes-Benz Award: Junk Mail by Pål Sletaune
- Canal+ Award: The Signalman by Benoît Mariage

=== François Chalais Award ===
- The Perfect Circle by Ademir Kenović

== Media ==
- INA: Climbing of the steps for the opening of the 1997 Festival (commentary in French)
- INA: List of winners of the 1997 festival (commentary in French)
