= The Machine to Kill Bad People =

- Directed by: Roberto Rossellini
- Written by: Sergio Amidei; Giancarlo Vigorelli; Franco Brusati; Liana Ferri; Roberto Rossellini; Giuseppe Marotta; Eduardo De Filippo
- Produced by: Salvo D'Angelo
- Starring: Marilyn Buferd; William Tubbs; Clara Bindi
- Cinematography: Enrico Betti Berutto; Tino Santoni
- Edited by: Jolanda Benvenuti
- Music by: Renzo Rossellini
- Production companies: Tevere Film; Universalia Film
- Release date: 14 May 1952
- Running time: 80 minutes
- Country: Italy
- Language: Italian

The Machine to Kill Bad People (Italian: La Macchina ammazzacattivi) is a 1952 Italian fantasy comedy film directed by Roberto Rossellini and featuring Marilyn Buferd, William Tubbs and Clara Bindi. It is part of the tradition of neorealism of the post-war years. Having helped neorealism gain international recognition with his 1945 work Rome, Open City, Rossellini was trying to branch out into different styles.

== Production ==
Rossellini began shooting the film in 1948, but production was beset by many problems. Location shooting took place around Amalfi, Salerno and Trani.

== Synopsis ==
A stranger claiming to be Saint Andrea gives to the village photographer a magic camera with the power to destroy the wicked. When it becomes apparent that no one is immune the photographer turns the device on the giver, who is unmasked as a devil and forced to return everyone to life.

== Cast ==
- Gennaro Pisano as Celestino
- Marilyn Buferd as American tourist
- William Tubbs as American tourist
- Helen Tubbs as American tourist
- Giovanni Amato as Mayor
- Clara Bindi as Giulietta Del Bello
- Giacomo Furia as Romano
- Aldo Giuffrè
- Carlo Giuffrè

== Bibliography ==
- Peter, Bondanella. The Films of Roberto Rossellini. Cambridge University Press, 1993.
- Brunette, Peter. Roberto Rossellini. University of California Press, 1996.
- Nowell-Smith, Geoffrey . The Companion to Italian Cinema. Cassell, 1996.
- Wagstaff, Christopher. Italian Neorealist Cinema: An Aesthetic Approach. University of Toronto Press, 2007.
