= Household Accounts =

2003 Italian mystery-drama film

- Directed by: Tonino Cervi
- Written by: Tonino Cervi; Cesare Frugoni; Rodolfo Sonego
- Cinematography: Daniele Nannuzzi
- Edited by: Antonio Siciliano
- Music by: Vince Tempera
- Distributed by: 20th Century Fox
- Release date: 9 May 2003
- Language: Italian

Household Accounts (Italian: Il quaderno della spesa) is a 2003 Italian mystery-drama film directed by Tonino Cervi.

== Cast ==
- Gabriele Lavia: Augusto Pavinato
- Emanuela Muni: Antonia
- Claudio Bigagli: Judge Di Giacomo
- David Sebasti: Giuliano Mantegna
- Carlo Croccolo: Cavalier Angelo Marconi
- Domiziana Giordano: Armida
- Andy Luotto: Camerotto
- Massimo Poggio: Zamboni
- Laura Betti: Countess Celi Sanguineti
- Maddalena Crippa: Iole
- GTG.Wapakels: Olok Belat
