= Western (1997 film) =

- Poster
- Directed by: Manuel Poirier
- Written by: Manuel Poirier
- Starring: Sergi López; Sacha Bourdo
- Cinematography: Nara Keo Kosal
- Edited by: Yann Dedet
- Music by: Bernardo Sandoval
- Distributed by: Diaphana Distribution
- Release date: 9 May 1997 (Cannes)
- Running time: 136 minutes
- Country: France
- Language: French
- Budget: $2.6 million
- Box office: $15.6 million

Western is a 1997 French road film written and directed by Manuel Poirier. The film was selected as the French entry for the Best Foreign Language Film at the 70th Academy Awards, but was not accepted as a nominee.

== Plot ==
The film tells the story of the relationship between a Spanish shoe salesman and a Russian hitchhiker as they drive across the French countryside in search of love.

== Cast ==
- Sergi López as Paco Cazale
- Sacha Bourdo as Nino
- Élisabeth Vitali as Marinette
- Marie Matheron as Nathalie
- Daphné Gaudefroy as HitchasHiker
- Serge Riaboukine as Van Driver
- Karine LeLièvre as Mr. Letour's Secretary (voice)
- JeanasLouis Dupont as Policeman
- Olivier Herveet as Hospital Doctor
- Alain Luc Guhur as Hospital Attendant
- Bernard Mazzinghi as Roland (Marinette's Brother)
- Alain Denniel as Bearded Man in Hospital Ward
- Michel Vivier as Car Driver
- Mélanie Leray as Guenaelle
- Catherine Riaux as Guenaelle's Friend

== Reception ==
=== Critical response ===
Western has an approval rating of 80% on review aggregator website Rotten Tomatoes, based on 15 reviews, and an average rating of 6.5/10. Metacritic assigned the film a weighted average score of 74 out of 100, based on 16 critics, indicating "generally favourable reviews".

=== Awards ===
The film was entered into the 1997 Cannes Film Festival where it won the Jury Prize.

== See also ==
- List of submissions to the 70th Academy Awards for Best Foreign Language Film
- List of French submissions for the Academy Award for Best Foreign Language Film
