= Brigitte Roüan =

French actress, film director and screenwriter

- Born: 28 September 1946 (age 80); Toulon, France
- Occupations: Actress, screenwriter, director
- Years active: 1969–present

Brigitte Roüan (born 28 September 1946) is a French director, screenwriter and actress.

== Life and career ==
Rouan was born into a French naval family in Toulon in 1946. She was orphaned at age six and spent her childhood in Algeria and Senegal. At age 12, she left for convent school in Paris.

Her acting career began at age 21, on the stage. Her performance lead the way to small film roles for directors including Alain Resnais, Jacques Rivette, and Bertrand Tavernier.

Rouan became a director in her own right when she helmed a short film titled Grosse. It won a César Award in 1986. She would become a feature film director with Overseas (1990), which won the Critics' Week award at the 1990 Cannes Film Festival. She co-starred in the film with Marianne Basler and Nicole Garcia to portray sisters in colonial North Africa during the 1950s.

The now actor-director would continue in roles, including one in Olivier, Olivier (1991) for Polish director Agnieszka Holland.

Rouan's 1997 film Post Coitum, Animal Triste garnered attention for its depiction of an affair between a middle-aged woman (played by Rouan herself) and a younger man. The film was a success in its native country and received strong notices in America, where it screened at the New York Film Festival before playing to arthouse crowds. It was also screened in the Un Certain Regard section at the 1997 Cannes Film Festival.

In 1998, she was a member of the jury at the 48th Berlin International Film Festival.

== Theater ==
Year	Title	Author	Director
1969	La Sagesse ou la Parabole du festin	Paul Claudel	Victor Garcia
1970–71	The Boors	Carlo Goldoni	Jean-François Rémi
1971	L’Escalier de Silas	Geneviève Serreau	Michel Peyrelon
1972	The Winter's Tale	William Shakespeare	Chattie Salaman
1973	Smoking	Jean-Pierre Bisson	Jean-Pierre Bisson
1973–74	Sarcelles-sur-Mer	Jean-Pierre Bisson	Jean-Pierre Bisson & Jean-François Prévand
1973–74	Et ils passèrent des menottes aux fleurs	Fernando Arrabal	Fernando Arrabal
1974	Madras, la nuit où...	Eduardo Manet	Claude Confortès
1974	Drums in the Night	Bertolt Brecht	Robert Gironès
1975	Quatorze juillet	Serge Ganzl	Denis Llorca
1975	Faust-Salpétrière	Johann Wolfgang von Goethe	Klaus Michael Grüber
1976	Regeneration	Italo Svevo	Bernard Chatellier, Robert Gironès, Ginette Herry & Jean Magnan
1976	Gl'innamorati	Carlo Goldoni	Caroline Huppert
1977–78	Hamlet	William Shakespeare	Benno Besson
1979	Le souper d'adieu	Arthur Schnitzler	Nat Lilenstein
1979	Un ou deux sourires par jour	Antoine Gallien	Jean-Claude Fall
1979	Le nouveau contrat de mariage	Gérard Poitou-Weber	Gérard Poitou-Weber
1980	La Nuit	Régis Santon	Régis Santon
1982	Kingdom of Earth	Tennessee Williams	Pierre Romans
1982	Vingt-deux coups de théâtre	Jacques Weber	Jacques Weber
1984–85	Le Pain dur	Paul Claudel	Gildas Bourdet
1985	Balise de toi	Jean-Pierre Bisson	Jean-Pierre Bisson
1986	Flirt pour deux	Maurice Hennequin	Jean-Pierre Bisson
1986	Six Characters in Search of an Author	Luigi Pirandello	Jean-Pierre Vincent
1988	Les Empailleurs	Jenny Arasse	Philippe Madral
2012–14	The Seagull	Anton Chekhov	Frédéric Bélier-Garcia
2017	À plusieurs	Salomé Lelouch	Jean-Philippe Puymartin

== Filmography ==
=== As actress - Cinema ===
Year	Title	Role	Director	Notes
1971	Out 1	Miss Blandish	Jacques Rivette & Suzanne Schiffman	
1975	La messe dorée	Rose	Beni Montresor	
1975	Let Joy Reign Supreme	The prostitute	Bertrand Tavernier	
1976	Demain les mômes	Suzanne	Jean Pourtalé	
1977	Paradiso	The sister	Christian Bricout	

=== As actress - Television ===
Year	Title	Role	Director	Notes
1972	Les Boussardel	Anne-Marie Mortier	René Lucot	TV series (1 episode)
1972	Le 16 à Kerbriant	Françoise Martoret	Michel Wyn	TV series (9 episodes)
1973	Marie Dorval	Gabrielle	Pierre Badel	TV movie
1974	Le cas Adam et Ève	Ève	Serge Witta	TV movie
1974	Ce que savait Morgan	Amy	Luc Béraud	TV movie
1974	Gil Blas de Santillane	The Duchess	Jean-Roger Cadet	TV mini-series
1975	Le cardinal de Retz	Madame de Pommereu	Bernard d'Abrigeon	TV movie
1975	Plain-chant	The young girl	Nat Lilienstein	TV series (1 episode)
1977	L'enlèvement du régent	Duchesse du Maine	Gérard Vergez	TV movie
1977	Les héritiers	Véronique Chaumard	Roger Pigaut	TV series (1 episode)
1977	Commissaire Moulin	Joëlle Lévêque	Claude Grinberg	TV series (1 episode)

- Overseas (1990) as Malène
- Les Agneaux (1996)
- Unpredictable Nature of the River (1996)
- Post Coitum, Animal Triste (1997) as Diane Clovier
- Why Not Me? (1999) as Josepha
- Le Temps du Loup (Time of the Wolf) (2003) as Béa
- The Pleasure Is All Mine (2004) as Nicole
- Love Songs (2007) as Julie's Mother
- Spiral (TV series) (2008) as Karine Fontane
- The Ultimate Accessory (2013)
- Demi-soeur (2013)
- Love at First Fight (2014)
- From the Land of the Moon (2016)
- Guy (2018)

=== Filmmaker ===
Year	Title	Notes
1985	Grosse	Short
1990	Outremer	
1997	After Sex	
2001	Sa mère, la pute	TV movie
2005	Travaux, on sait quand ça commence...	
2006	Dix films pour en parler	TV series (1 episode)
2009	Suite noire	TV series (1 episode)
2013	Tu honoreras ta mère et ta mère	
2013	Stop à la Grèce en slip	Short

== Awards and nominations ==
Year	Award	Nominated work	Result
1986	César Award for Best Fiction Short Film	Grosse	Won
1990	Festival International du Film Francophone de Namur - Best Screenplay	Outremer	Won
1990	Stockholm International Film Festival - Bronze Horse	Outremer	Nominated
1991	César Award for Best First Film	Outremer	Nominated
1997	European Film Award for Best Actress	After Sex	Nominated
1997	Chicago International Film Festival - New Directors Competition	After Sex	Nominated
1997	Festival International du Film Francophone de Namur - Best Film	After Sex	Nominated
