= Paul Chart =

English film director

- Born: 10 October 1961 (age 64); London, England
- Occupations: Film director Screenwriter
- Years active: 1984-present

Paul Chart (born 10 October 1961) is an English film director, screenwriter and producer. His film American Perfekt was screened in the Un Certain Regard section at the 1997 Cannes Film Festival.

== Filmography ==
- Not a War Film (1984)
- Hand in Hand (1985)
- Nothing Wrong (1987)
- Foreign Bodies (1987)
- Judgment in Berlin (1988) (writer - uncredited)
- A Conversation with Ken Kesey (1995)
- American Perfekt (1997)
- Nasty (2018) (short)
- Rock and Roll with Me (2019) (short)
- Bloodhound (2026) Editor, Color Correction, Producer
