= Stefania Rocca =

Italian actress

- Born: 24 April 1971 (age 55); Turin, Italy
- Occupation: Actress
- Spouse: Carlo Capasa (after 2013)
- Children: 2

Stefania Rocca (born 24 April 1971) is an Italian actress. She is best known for her roles in the films Nirvana (1997), The Talented Mr. Ripley (1999) and Dracula (2002). Rocca was also the lead in Dario Argento's The Card Player. Among her most recent appearances, she was in Alessandro D'Alatri's comedy film Commediasexi where she played the main character, Pia Roncaldi. She starred as Hannah in the 1997 film Solomon.

== Background and personal life ==
Rocca was born on 24 April 1971 in Turin, the daughter of a Fiat chief of security and a stylist. Beginning in her adolescence, Rocca studied piano, singing, and dancing at the Teatro Stabile di Torino. In the late 1980s she moved to Milan where she started working as a model; in Milan, she enrolled in a series of acting courses. In 1993, thanks to a scholarship, she joined the Centro Sperimentale di Cinematografia in Rome. She also studied at the Actors Studio in New York City.

Rocca is married to her long-time partner Carlo Capasa, whom she wed in a highly secretive ceremony in 2013. The couple has been together since 2005, and has two sons.

== Career ==
Rocca made her acting debut with a secondary role in Giulio Base's Policemen but her breakout role was the blue-haired Naima in the Gabriele Salvatores' cyberpunk film Nirvana (1997). After enrolling a course at the Actors Studio in New York, in 1998, Rocca had her first main role in the controversial erotic thriller Viol@, and for her performance she was nominated to the Nastro d'Argento for Best Actress. One year later, Rocca appeared in Anthony Minghella's The Talented Mr. Ripley as Jude Law's lover, then she appeared in other international productions, including Kenneth Branagh's Love's Labour's Lost, Mike Figgis' experimental Hotel and Tom Tykwer's Heaven.

In 2003, Rocca had her main commercial success in Italy, with Alessandro D'Alatri's comedy Casomai, which also gave her a nomination for Best Actress at the Nastro d'Argento and David di Donatello Awards. In 2005, she played a blind lesbian in the Academy Award-nominated drama The Beast in the Heart, and for her performance, she was nominated for the David di Donatello for Best Supporting Actress. Since the mid-2000s, Rocca has mainly appeared on television. She is also active on stage.

== Filmography ==
=== Film ===
Year	Title	Role
1995	Policemen	Valeria
1995	Palermo - Milan One Way	Maria Pia
1997	Nirvana	Naima
1997	Inside/Out	Grace Patterson
1997	L'amico di Wang	Simonetta
1998	Voglio una donnaaa!	Marta
1998	Viol@	Marta / Viola
1998	Giochi d'equilibrio	Francesca (1977)
1999	In the Beginning There Was Underwear	Teresa
1999	The Talented Mr. Ripley	Silvana
2000	Love's Labour's Lost	Jacquanetta
2000	Rosa and Cornelia	Rosa
2001	Hotel	Sophie
2002	Heaven	Regina
2002	Casomai	Stefania
2003	Life as It Comes	Giorgia
2003	Five Moons Square	Fernanda
2003	Kiss Me First	Adele
2004	The Card Player	Anna Mari
2004	Love Is Eternal While It Lasts	Carlotta
2005	Mary	Brenda Sax
2005	The Beast in the Heart	Emilia
2005	Aspects of Love	Giulietta Trapani
2006	The Bodyguard's Cure	Vera Mezza
2006	Commediasexi	Pia Roncaldi
2007	The Candidate	Laura Dedieu
2007	Voce del verbo amore	Francesca
2007	Go Go Tales	Debby
2010	A Woman	Natalie
2011	The Invader	Agnès de Yael
2011	L'amore fa male	Germana
2013	The Third Half	Teresa
2014	A Fairy-Tale Wedding	Luciana
2014	Do You See Me?	Maria
2015	One More Day	Giulia
2016	Abbraccialo per me	Caterina
2016	Calcolo infinitesimale	Valeria / Betta / Madre di Betta
2016	Non si ruba a casa dei ladri	Daniela Russo
2017	Mom or Dad?	Sonia
2018	I'm Back	Katia Bellini
2022	The Man Who Drew God	

=== Television ===
Year	Title	Role	Notes
1994	Italian Restaurant	Attrice Spot	Episode: "Nuova gestione"
1995	Voci notturne	Carla	TV miniseries
1996	Running Against	Chiara	TV film
1996	Donna	Veronica	Episode: "1.6"
1996	I ragazzi del muretto	Barbara	Episode: "Nepal"
1997	Nei secoli dei secoli	Pia	Segment: "Il mappamondo"
1997	Solomon	Hannah	TV miniseries
1998	Amiche davvero!!	Claudia	TV film
1999	Shadows	Elena	TV film
1999	Jesus	Mary of Bethany	TV miniseries
2000	Lourdes	Nathalie Guillaumet	TV film
2001	Resurrection	Katiuscia Maslova	TV film
2002	Dracula	Mina	TV miniseries
2004	Stauffenberg	Margarethe von Oven	TV film
2005	The 4 Musketeers	Anne D'Autriche	Episodes: "1.1", "1.2"
2006	Mafalda of Savoy	Princess Mafalda of Savoy	TV film
2007	Candidat libre	Susan	TV film
2008–09	Tutti pazzi per amore	Laura Del Fiore	Main role (series 1)
2009	Bakhita	Aurora Marin	TV film
2011	Edda Ciano e il comunista	Edda Ciano	TV film
2012	Never for Love	Laura	Episode: "La fuga di Teresa"
2012	Little Lady	Malvina Farelli	TV film
2012–2015	The Family	Chiara	TV series
2013	Altri tempi	Duchessa	TV film
2013	Adriano Olivetti: La forza di un sogno	Karen Bates	TV film
2014	Gli anni spezzati	Grazia Sossi	Episode: "Il giudice"
2017	Di padre in figlia	Franca Franza	TV miniseries
2017	Wedding in Rome	Gioia	TV film
