= F-rating =

Film rating to highlight women on screen and behind the camera

The F-Rating is a rating to highlight women on screen and behind the camera. Developed at Bath Film Festival in 2014, the F-Rating was inspired by the Bechdel Test based on a 1985 cartoon strip by Alison Bechdel, and popularised in the 2010s by Anita Sarkeesian's Feminist Frequency blog, and by Ellen Tejle's A-rating in Swedish cinemas. In response to criticisms of the A-rating, Swedish film theorists Ingrid Ryberg, Anu Koivunen and Laura Horak wrote: "The A rating has proved to be an activist provocation that works, and it is important to ask why... The A rating is not about classifying films as feminist or not feminist. It aims to alert viewers who find female sociality compelling to films they might like, and so challenge the industry to make more such films."

The festival developed the F-Rating in October 2014 "to take it a step further and highlight films which either had a senior figure in production who was female—a director or a screenwriter—or had very strong female leads or women's issues," according to festival director and F-Rating founder Holly Tarquini. Tarquini told the BBC that films had to meet at least one of three criteria to receive the rating: "If our films have a female director, a female lead who is not simply there to support the male lead, or are specifically about women then they will receive an F-rated stamp of approval."

In 2016, the F-rated founder, Holly Tarquini, was invited to deliver a TED talk at TEDxYouth@Bath.

== Rationale ==
The F-Rating is a reaction to a phenomenon known as the celluloid ceiling, which has been documented internationally. "BFI figures showed that in 2011, 15% of all UK films released were directed by women, but in 2012, this went down to 7.8%.", while a study by "the Center for the Study of Women in Television and Film at San Diego State University found females made up 15 per cent of protagonists, 29 per cent of major characters and 30 per cent of all speaking characters in the 100 top-grossing films of 2013."

== Bath Film Festival 2014: first implementation ==
Seventeen of the forty-two films received the F-Rating, included the First World War drama Testament of Youth, based on Vera Brittain's memoir of the same name, and director Jean-Marc Vallée's true-life tale Wild, starring Reese Witherspoon. Women's magazines Marie Claire and Elle both gave positive coverage to the rating and programme, which were also mentioned in UK Culture Minister Ed Vaizey's weekly bulletin.

== Subsequent implementation ==
In February 2015, the Bath Comedy Festival announced that it would be the UK's first F-rated comedy festival, with performers including Viv Groskop and Helen Lederer. In March 2015, Komedia Bath arranged a meeting to encourage all Bath festivals, including the Bath Festival of Children's Literature and Bath International Music Festival, and arts organisations to make Bath the first F-rated city.

The 2015 Bath Film Festival programme was 45% F-rated, and attracted more attention. In 2015, all the independent cinemas and film festivals in the UK were invited to join the F-Rating, with dozens signing up to F-rated their programme. In 2016, The Barbican became the 40th organisation to adopt the rating.

== F-rated keyword added to IMDb ==
In January 2017, the F-rated keyword was added to IMDb. By March 2017, there were more than 22,400 films on IMDb tagged with the F-rated keyword. The rating was defended by GQ Magazine.
