= The Banned Woman =

1997 film

The Forbidden Woman
- Directed by: Philippe Harel
- Written by: Philippe Harel; Éric Assous
- Produced by: Gaëlle Girre; Michel Guilloux
- Starring: Isabelle Carré
- Cinematography: Gilles Henry
- Edited by: Bénédicte Teiger
- Distributed by: Lazennec Diffusion
- Release date: 24 September 1997
- Running time: 100 minutes
- Country: France
- Language: French

The Forbidden Woman (French: La Femme défendue) is a 1997 French drama film directed by Philippe Harel. It was entered into the 1997 Cannes Film Festival.

The film portrays the seduction of a young woman by an older married man; the film is focused on the face of the young woman, rarely on her lover or other people.

== Cast ==
- Isabelle Carré – Elle (Muriel)
- Philippe Harel – Moi (François)
- Nathalie Conio – My secretary
- Sophie Niedergang – My wife
- Julien Niedergang – My son
- Zinedine Soualem – The ticket's man
