= Bath Film Festival =

- Location: Bath, England
- Founded: 1990; 36 years ago
- Website: filmbath.org.uk

Bath Film Festival, known as FilmBath, is an annual film festival held in Bath, England. It was established in 1990 by members of the Bath Film Society.

== History ==
The organisation has expanded in duration, venues, and titles. In 1997, it was registered as a non profit-distributing company and, in 2000, as a charitable organisation. The festival has also expanded its programme over the years to include workshops for festival-goers, live music accompaniments to silent cinema, and more recently, open-air cinema, starting in 2003 with a screening of E.T. in partnership with the Holburne Museum of Art. Since its foundation, the festival has screened over 1000 films.

Nicolas Roeg's 2007 film Puffball had its UK premiere at the festival. In January 2014, a special screening of Martin Scorsese's The Last Temptation of Christ at Wells Cathedral (along with a companion screening of The Passion of Joan of Arc at Bath Abbey) provoked some controversy; the church defended its decision to allow the screening.

IMDb is a co-sponsor of the festival and of several festival awards.

== F-Rating ==
In 2014, the festival's executive director, Holly Tarquini, founded the F-Rating which is awarded to films directed and/or written by women. The F-Rating has been adopted by dozens of independent film festivals and cinemas, including the Barbican Centre. In 2017, the keyword 'F-Rated' was added to over 22,000 titles on IMDb.
