= After Sex (1997 film) =

1997 film by Brigitte Roüan

- Film poster
- Directed by: Brigitte Roüan
- Written by: Santiago Amigorena; Philippe Le Guay; Jean-Louis Richard; Brigitte Roüan; Guy Zilberstein
- Produced by: Humbert Balsan
- Starring: Brigitte Roüan; Patrick Chesnais
- Cinematography: Pierre Dupouey
- Edited by: Laurent Roüan
- Music by: Michel Musseau; Umberto Tozzi
- Distributed by: Pyramide Distribution
- Release date: 29 August 1997
- Running time: 97 minutes
- Country: France
- Language: French

After Sex (French: Post coïtum animal triste) is a 1997 film by French director Brigitte Roüan.

Roüan stars in the film as Diane Clovier, a married mother of two who has an affair with the friend of a young writer she is mentoring. Meanwhile, her husband, a lawyer, is defending a woman charged with murdering her unfaithful spouse.

The film was well received in its native France, but raised some eyebrows for its sympathetic treatment of a woman's infidelity. The film also received positive notice in the United States, where it was released in 1998. It was screened in the Un Certain Regard section at the 1997 Cannes Film Festival.

The original French title, literally "After Coitus, Sad Animal", alludes to post-coital tristesse.

== Cast ==
- Brigitte Roüan as Diane Clovier
- Patrick Chesnais as Philippe Clovier
- Boris Terral as Emilio
- Nils Tavernier as François Narou
- Jean-Louis Richard as Weyoman-Lebeau
- Françoise Arnoul as Madame LePluche
- Emmanuelle Bach as Caroline
- Carmen Chaplin as Copine Narou
- Gaëlle Le Fur as Isabelle
- Elodie Pong as Designer
- Roberto Plate as Miguel
- Olivier Lechat as Victor
- Félix Dedet-Roüan as Basile
- Jean Delavalade as Dedé
- Jean-Claude Chapuis as Musical Classes Player

== Reception ==
On review aggregator website Rotten Tomatoes the film has a score of 74% based on reviews from 18 critics, with an average rating of 6.4/10.

Steve Davis of The Austin Chronicle gave the film 3 stars out of 5, while Sandra Brennan AllMovie gives it 2 stars out of 5.

Roger Ebert of the Chicago Sun-Times gave it 3 stars out of 4 and stated that "By the end of the film, we have come to admire Rouan's courage as a performer and a filmmaker, in following Diane's mania as far as it will go".

== Sources ==
- Riding, Alan (8 March 1998). "FILM; When the Tables Are Turned in Adultery's Secret Rooms (Published 1998)". The New York Times.
