= Manuel Poirier =

French film director

- Born: 17 November 1954 (age 71); Peru
- Occupations: Film director Screenwriter
- Years active: 1984–present

Manuel Poirier (born 17 November 1954) is a French film director and screenwriter. He has directed 15 films since 1984. His film Western won the Jury Prize at the 1997 Cannes Film Festival.

== Filmography ==
- La première journée de Nicolas (1984)
- La lettre à Dédé (1985)
- Appartement 62 (1986)
- Sales histoires (1990)
- La petite amie d'Antonio (1992)
- ...à la campagne (1995)
- Attention, fragile (1995)
- Marion (1997)
- Western (1997)
- De la lumière quand même (2000)
- Te quiero (2001)
- Les femmes... ou les enfants d'abord... (2002)
- Chemins de traverse (2004)
- Le sang des fraises (2006)
- La maison (2007)
