= Philippe Harel =

French actor and film director

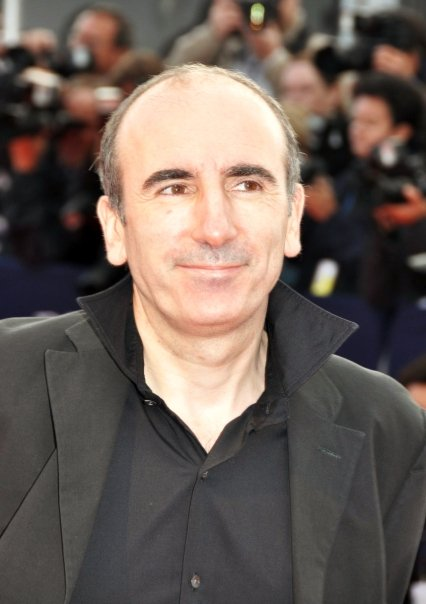
- Harel at the 2009 Deauville American Film Festival
- Born: 22 December 1956 (age 69); Paris, France
- Occupations: Film director, screenwriter, actor

Philippe Harel (born 22 December 1956) is a French film director, actor and screenwriter.

== Selected filmography ==
- The Story of a Boy Who Wanted to Be Kissed (1994)
- Une visite (1996) (Short)
- Les randonneurs (1997)
- La femme défendue (1997)
- Whatever (Extension du domaine de la lutte) (1999)
- A Hell of a Day (2001)
- Le Vélo de Ghislain Lambert (2001)
- Tristan (2003)
- Tu vas rire mais je te quitte (2005)
- Les Randonneurs à Saint-Tropez (2008)
- Les Heures souterraines (2015)
- Un adultère (2018)
