= Kick-Ass =

Kick-Ass, Kick Ass or Kickass may refer to:

== Comics and film franchise ==
- Kick-Ass – The Dave Lizewski Years, or simply Kick-Ass, a comic book series written by Mark Millar and illustrated by John Romita Jr.
  - Kick-Ass (character), fictional character and main character of the original series
    - Kick-Ass (film), a 2010 film with the above character as the main character
    - Kick-Ass 2, a 2013 sequel with the above character as the main character
  - Kick-Ass: The Game, a video game based on the comics and film
  - Kick-Ass – The New Girl, or simply Kick-Ass, a comic-book spin-off series

== Music ==
- Kick-Ass (soundtrack), soundtrack from the 2010 film
  - "Kick Ass (We Are Young)", song by Mika vs. RedOne, from the soundtrack
- "Kick Ass" (Bryan Adams song)

== Other uses ==
- Kick-Ass (English debate team), informal name of Colegio de la Preciosa Sangre de Pichilemu's English debate team
- Kick Ass (book), 1999 collection of columns by Carl Hiaasen
- KickassTorrents, a defunct torrenting website
