= Kick-Ass 2 =

Kick-Ass 2 may refer to:

- Kick-Ass 2 (comics)
- Kick-Ass 2 (film), based on the comics
- Kick-Ass 2: The Game, based on the film
