= Hit-Girl =

Comic book superhero

- Millarworld character
- The comic print is a variant cover for Hit-Girl #10, Her swords chop off the hands of God and Adam in a reference to The Creation of Adam.
- First appearance: Kick-Ass #3 (July 2008)
- Last appearance: Big Game #5 (November 2023)
- Created by: Mark Millar; John Romita Jr.
- Portrayed by: Chloë Grace Moretz

In-universe information
- Full name: Mindy McCready
- Gender: Female
- Occupation: Vigilante; Kingsman agent
- Family: Damon McCready / Big Daddy (father, deceased); Kathleen McCready (née Williams) (mother, deceased in film)
- Significant other: Dave Lizewski (film)
- Abilities: Martial arts training
- Age: 11–12 (The Dave Lizewski Years); 13–14 (Hit-Girl); 27 (Big Game)

Hit-Girl (Mindy McCready) is an antihero appearing in the Millarworld shared fictional universe, published by Marvel Comics under the company's imprint Icon Comics and later Image Comics, one of the main characters of the Kick-Ass franchise. The character was created by artist John Romita Jr. and writer Mark Millar. She is a young and effective vigilante, trained by her father Damon McCready (Big Daddy) from an early age to be a costumed superhero and assassin, introduced in Kick-Ass – The Dave Lizewski Years as a supporting character and ultimate co-protagonist, along with Dave Lizewski. She featured in her own self-titled comic book series, Hit-Girl, published from 2018 to 2020 by Image Comics. She returned in the 2023 miniseries Big Game, becoming a Kingsman agent and killing Wesley Gibson.

Hit-Girl is portrayed by Chloë Grace Moretz in the feature films Kick-Ass (2010) and Kick Ass 2 (2013) and the video games Kick-Ass: The Game (2010) and Kick-Ass 2: The Game (2014), with her name spelled Mindy Macready, unlike in the comics.

== Comics ==
=== Kick-Ass – The Dave Lizewski Years ===
Following her father's death in the first volume of the comic The Dave Lizewski Years, Hit-Girl takes on Kick-Ass (Dave Lizewski) as her crime-fighting partner in the second and third volumes, training him and using him to hunt criminals together with her. She gets him to teach her how to be a normal kid, and get along with other girls somewhat older than herself. After she is arrested at the conclusion of the third volume, she breaks herself out of prison, and, joining back together with Kick-Ass, takes out the entirety of the Genovese crime family and their accomplices, before taking on a new Kick-Ass as her sidekick.

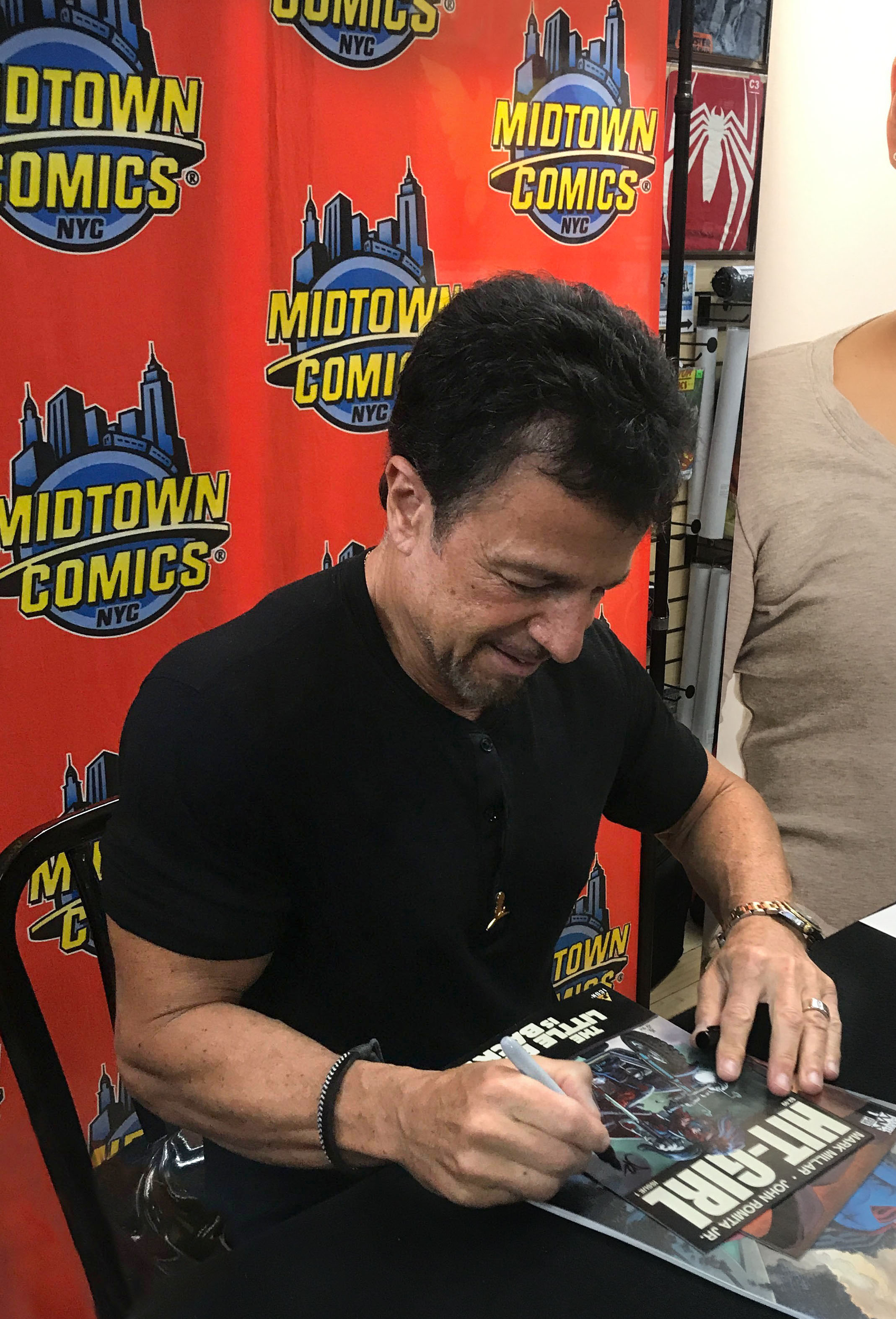
Artist John Romita Jr. signing a copy of the series at Midtown Comics in Manhattan

=== Hit-Girl ===
In Hit-Girl, following the events of The Dave Lizewski Years, Mindy travels worldwide hunting down criminals, appearing in Hit-Girl In Colombia, Canada, Rome, Hollywood, Hong Kong, and India.

=== Kick-Ass – The New Girl ===
Although Hit-Girl does not appear in the main plot of Kick-Ass – The New Girl, a variant cover for the first and fifth issues of the series features her (Hit-Girl) in combat with the Patience Lee incarnation of Kick-Ass. In an epilogue in the final issue of the series, Hit-Girl is made aware of Patience's activities as a supervillain using the Kick-Ass name, prompting her to return to the U.S. to kill her. A five-issue crossover miniseries depicting this confrontation, Kick-Ass vs Hit-Girl, was subsequently published from November 11, 2020 to March 17, 2021.

=== Crossover ===
An adult Hit-Girl first appears in the sixth issue of Crossover after being dragged into another reality by "The Event", partaking in an endless battle between residents of the Marvel, DC, and Image Universes (amongst characters from many other properties by Image Comics, Dark Horse Comics, Skybound Entertainment and Boom! Studios, including The Wicked + The Divine and I Hate Fairyland), saving Otto and Ellie before jumping into another battle.

=== Big Game ===
The adult Hit-Girl returns in Big Game, where-in she is rescued from assassination by British secret Eggsy Unwin / Agent Galahad of Kingsman, with whom she then infiltrates the headquarters of the Fraternity to assassinate Wesley Gibson. After Eggsy is killed, Mindy uses the Fraternity's stolen time machine to travel back in time, ending up in prehistoric times. After her actions lead to a prehistoric alien army invading the future, aiming to prevent the worldwide assassinations of all superheroes, Mindy travels back in time again to save them, with both her and her slightly younger self joining forces against Wesley, the Fraternity, and the alien army.

== Films ==
The character appears in the 2010 film adaptation Kick-Ass, and the 2013 sequel Kick-Ass 2. Jane Goldman, one of the two co-writers of the first film's script, said, "We just really wanted Hit-Girl to be a character who, in a sense, simply happens to be an eleven-year-old girl, in the same way that Ripley in Alien could have been a guy but the part happened to be played by Sigourney Weaver." Goldman said that Mindy "is genuinely dangerous, she's genuinely mad. It's not her fault: she's been raised in this environment where she doesn't know anything different. She's unwittingly part of a folie à deux." When asked if Hit-Girl could be considered a feminist heroine, Goldman said "Yeah... she's a feminist hero by token of the fact that she pays no attention to gender stereotypes. I think she also doesn't want special treatment because she's a girl."

=== Casting ===
Chloë Grace Moretz as Hit-Girl in the 2010 film adaptation of Kick-Ass

In 2008, shortly before the release of the film Wanted, 11-year-old actress Chloë Grace Moretz saw posters of Angelina Jolie for the film while riding with her mother in Los Angeles, prompting her to ask for a role that she described as "an Angelina Jolie-type character" and "like an action hero, woman empowerment, awesome, take-charge leading role". One month later, she was offered the role of Mindy Macready/Hit-Girl.

Matthew Vaughn, commenting on the maturity of Moretz, said that because she has four older brothers, she was no stranger to much of the language in the script. Moretz said that it was entertaining to illustrate the differences between Mindy and her superheroine identity "for me, 'cause it's almost like an alternate personality". Lewis Wallace of Wired said that Mindy "gets all the good lines, capping every Tarantino-scale bloodletting with a foul-mouthed joke". Christopher Mintz-Plasse, the actor who portrays Red Mist, said that "we (Kick-Ass and Red Mist) don't have any of the action in the movie. It's all Hit-Girl". Vaughn said that Hit-Girl is a part of "the ultimate father-daughter relationship, where Barbie dolls are replaced with knives, and unicorns become hand grenades".

To prepare for her role, Moretz took months of training in learning how to handle guns and to use butterfly knives and swords. Moretz stated that the shooting of the action scenes was arduous. Goldman said that the aspect of the film adaptation that excited her the most was adapting Hit-Girl's storyline to the film. Millar said he expected the character to receive mostly negative reception, "But the movie was so well made, I think, that people were quietly charmed by her for the most part. The only really negative thing we saw came from Roger Ebert and others from his generation who were upset, but there were those especially here in the United Kingdom [who] went crazy for her". Millar added he and Vaughn "were quite surprised about that. We were expecting the worst, that people were going to say she was amoral and we [in turn] were going to get killed for her. But it was much more of a case where people were positive about Hit-Girl even saying she was empowering female character".

=== Controversy ===
In January 2010, an uncensored preview clip from the first film was criticized by family advocacy groups for its display of violence and use of the line "Okay, you cunts, let's see what you can do now", delivered by Chloë Grace Moretz, who was twelve years old at the time of filming. Australian Family Association spokesman John Morrissey claimed that "the language [was] offensive and the values inappropriate; without the saving grace of the bloodless victory of traditional superheroes". Several critics accused the film of glorifying violence, particularly violence by young children.

In response to the controversy, Moretz stated in an interview, "If I ever uttered one word that I said in Kick-Ass, I would be grounded for years! I'd be stuck in my room until I was 20! I would never in a million years say that. I'm an average, everyday girl." Moretz has said that while filming, she could not bring herself to say the film's title out loud in interviews, instead calling it "the film" in public and "Kick-Butt" at home. Christopher Mintz-Plasse expressed surprise that people were angry about the language but did not seem to be offended that Hit-Girl violently kills many people on-screen.

=== Solo film discussions ===
In January 2015, Millar revealed to IGN that there was a planned Hit-Girl film with Gareth Evans directing but that it was cancelled.

However, in June 2015, Matthew Vaughn discussed a possibility of rebooting the Kick-Ass franchise with a Hit-Girl and Big Daddy prequel film to revive interest in the franchise. He stated that, "If we make that, hopefully that will be the sorbet for the people that didn't like Kick-Ass 2 and then we can go off and make Kick-Ass 3. I think we've got to do this prequel to regain the love that we had with Kick-Ass."

== Video games ==
Hit-Girl appear's as a playable character in Kick-Ass: The Game, she is not playable in kick-ass 2: the game, but is seen as an in-game model. Kick-Ass 2: The Game, each respectively based on the two films. the 2nd kick-ass game taking plot influence from the comic and or re-writing stuff.

== Toys ==
In 2010, Mezco released Hit-Girl figures based on the film and followed-up with figures released in 2013 by Neca.

== Skills and abilities ==
Mindy is an expert martial artist and proficient with a wide variety of melee weapons. She is capable of defeating large groups of armed thugs wielding a pair of swords or a double-bladed pole-arm. She is an excellent markswoman and proficient with practically all firearms from pistols to automatic rifles. Mindy is adept at stealth and evasion being able to infiltrate a maximum security prison with ease. She is an expert driver, with her vehicle of choice being a custom high-powered motorcycle. The nature of Big Daddy's training has made Hit-Girl a particularly brutal and remorseless character who does not flinch at torture or dispatching her opponents in the most gruesome and painful ways possible. She can be so intimidating that when she was briefly imprisoned she was soon the undisputed ruler of the adult penitentiary where she was held despite being a twelve-year-old girl. Mindy's one weakness, as pointed out by Mother Russia, is that her strength is limited by her youth which can cause an over-reliance on her weapons skills to compensate. Mother Russia seemed to be more than a match for Hit-Girl at hand-to-hand combat with the young vigilante winning their fight mostly through the intervention of chance.

== Personality ==
As a vigilante who regularly kills her opponents in violent fashion, Mindy displays the skill to carry out dangerous acts with high-level precision, and the emotional detachment and desensitized temperament necessary to do so. For example, when, in the comic book version, Kick-Ass tells her that her father was just murdered, she responds by saying, "Finish the job, mourn later." She exhibits other habits and demeanors more typically seen in adults who are hardened killers. She curses regularly and makes crude jokes, often adopting a sarcastic demeanor towards her crime-fighting partner/apprentice Kick-Ass, who describes her as resembling a mix between John Rambo and Polly Pocket. Despite the violent nature of her crime-fighting, and her ability to carry out such activities without apparent difficulty or remorse, Mindy has an interest in things typical of young people, such as Hello Kitty, comic books, Clint Eastwood and John Woo movies. However, when the villain Johnny G is finally dead at the end of The Dave Lizewski Years Book One, she turns to Kick-Ass and asks him for a hug, covered in tears and blood, as she mourns her father.
