= Kick-Ass (franchise) =

Media franchise

- Franchise logo
- Created by: Mark Millar; Jane Goldman; John Romita Jr.; Matthew Vaughn
- Original work: The Dave Lizewski Years (2008–2014)
- Owners: Comics: Icon Comics / Marvel Comics (2008–2014); Image Comics (2014–present); Millarworld (2018–present; Crossover series, 2020–present); Film distribution: Lionsgate (1) (2010); Universal Pictures (2) (2013); Marv Studios (1–4, reboot) (2010–present); Zeebo Productions (3–4, reboot) (2024–2025)

Print publications
- Comics: Kick-Ass series: The Dave Lizewski Years (2008–2014); The New Girl (2018–2019); Hit-Girl series: Season One (2018–2019); Season Two (2019–2020); Millarworld Annual (2016–2017); Kick-Ass vs. Hit-Girl (2020–2021); Crossover (2020–present); Big Game (2023)

Films and television
- Films: Kick-Ass (2010); Kick-Ass 2 (2013); Stuntnuts: The Movie (TBA); Stuntnuts Does School Fight (TBA)

Games
- Video games: Kick-Ass: The Game; Kick-Ass 2: The Game

Audio
- Soundtracks: Kick-Ass; Kick-Ass 2

Kick-Ass (also known as Hit-Girl & Kick-Ass, or simply Hit-Girl) is a media franchise based on the adventures of the superhero of the same name and its spinoff, created by Mark Millar and John Romita Jr. Set in the Millarworld, it began in 2008 with Marvel's Kick-Ass, followed by the anthology Millarworld Annual from 2016 to 2017, two stand-alone sequel series, Kick-Ass – The New Girl and Hit-Girl, from 2018 to 2020, and two crossover series, Kick-Ass vs. Hit-Girl and Big Game, in 2020 and 2023. In the series, Hit-Girl is a young vigilante (later a Kingsman agent) going around the world stopping crime in violent ways, while Kick-Ass has had three people take the mantle, a hero (Dave Lizewski), a sidekick (Paul McQue), and a villain (Patience Lee).

Kick-Ass, co-written and directed by Matthew Vaughn and also co-written by Jane Goldman, was released in March 2010. The film stars Aaron Taylor-Johnson and Chloë Grace Moretz. A sequel to this film, Kick-Ass 2, written and directed by Jeff Wadlow, was released in August 2013. Adaptations of the films have been published, and numerous Kick-Ass video games have been released since 2010. In January 2024, Matthew Vaughn revealed that a new trilogy of Kick-Ass films are in the works, and that the first two films, directed by Damien Walters and titled Stuntnuts: The Movie and Stuntnuts Does School Fight, had secretly been greenlit, cast, and had completed filming.

== Overview ==
Created by Mark Millar and John Romita Jr., the Hit-Girl & Kick-Ass franchise is set in Millar's shared universe, the Millarworld, first established at the conclusion of Book Four of The Dave Lizewski Years, which makes reference to the events of Wanted, Nemesis, Kingsman, Superior, and MPH, with Jupiter's Legacy and Supercrooks existing as fiction within the franchise, leading into the crossover miniseries Big Game, released in 2023 following extensive development hell.

== Comic series ==
=== Kick-Ass – The Dave Lizewski Years (2008–2014) ===
The Kick-Ass franchise began in 2008 with Book One of The Dave Lizewski Years, originally published as Kick-Ass. Books Two, Three, and Four, originally respectively published as Hit-Girl, Kick-Ass 2 and Kick-Ass 3, followed 2010–2014. The original series was rebranded as The Dave Lizewski Years following the release of stand-alone sequel series The New Girl and Hit-Girl in 2018, (Note: In newer collected editions of the first volume of the series, the books Kick-Ass, Hit-Girl, Kick-Ass 2: Balls to the Wall and Kick-Ass 3 were renamed as Books One, Two, Three and Four of The Dave Lizewski Years, so-as to differentiate the former series from the new 2018 Kick-Ass and Hit-Girl series.) and heavily edited to remove scenes of violence and swearing, and all mention of Dave Lizewski's identity as Kick-Ass being revealed to the world in the third volume, a plot point ignored in the fourth volume. The series follows Dave (initially a teenager) as he sets out to become a real-life superhero over the course of several years as Kick-Ass, who joins forces with existing vigilante Hit-Girl to take on the New York Mafia, their actions bringing an influx of supervillains and heroes into the world.

=== Millarworld Annual (2016–2017) ===
In 2016 and 2019, Mark Millar published the Millarworld Annual, an anthology annual consisting of one-shot specials containing winning entries from the online contest for up-and-coming creators held by Millar in 2015 and 2016), whose stories would be published within the canon of the Millarworld. The 2016 annual Millarworld Annual 2016 would contain the stories Kick-Ass: Blindsided (written by Ricardo Mo, and illustrated by Ifesinachi Orkiekwe) and Hit-Girl: Mindy's ABCs (written by Mark Abnett, and illustrated by Ozgur Yildirim), while the 2017 annual Millarworld New Talent Annual 2017 would contain the story Kick-Ass: Trick or Cheat (written by Emma Sayle, and illustrated by Edgy Ziane).

=== Kick-Ass – The New Girl (2018–2019) ===
As of February 14, 2018, a new Kick-Ass series from Image Comics, titled Kick-Ass – The New Girl, went into publication, featuring an adult female protagonist named Patience Lee, an Afghanistan war veteran and single mother who dons the Kick-Ass costume and mantle to clear her family's financial debts by initially robbing high-profile criminals, eventually becoming a crime boss and taking over the former crime bosses' territories as the supervillain Kick-Ass.

=== Hit-Girl (2018–2020) ===
On February 21, 2018, the first issue of a Hit-Girl series from Image Comics was published, with a successive change of writers and artists for each story arc; Frank Quitely, Eduardo Risso, Rafael Albuquerque, Kevin Smith, Daniel Way and Pete Milligan named as the authors involved for each arc, from Season One: Hit-Girl In Colombia, Canada, and Rome, and Season Two: Hollywood, Hong Kong, and India. The title sees Mindy McCready leaving America to carry on her fight for justice on a worldwide scale, depicting events mentioned in the epilogue of Book Four of The Dave Lizewski Years, serving as a sequel to the main events of the series.

=== Kick-Ass vs. Hit-Girl (2020–2021) ===
Kick-Ass vs. Hit-Girl, a five-issue series depicting the first confrontation between Hit-Girl and Patience Lee, went into publication on November 11, 2020, serving as the fourth and final volumes of Kick-Ass – The New Girl and the seventh and final volume of Hit-Girl.

=== Crossover (2020–present) ===
An adult Hit-Girl first appears in the sixth issue of the Image Comics crossover series Crossover after being dragged into another reality by "The Event," partaking in an endless battle between residents of the Marvel, DC, and Image Universes (amongst characters from many other properties by Image Comics, Dark Horse Comics, Skybound Entertainment and Boom! Studios, including The Wicked + The Divine and I Hate Fairyland), saving Otto and Ellie before jumping into another battle.

=== Big Game (2023) ===
In this miniseries, set fifteen years after the events of The Dave Lizewski Years, a now-27-year-old Mindy and 31-year-old Dave separately go up against the Fraternity of Super-Criminals led by Wesley Gibson, with Mindy teaming up with Gary "Eggsy" Unwin and joining his spy organisation Kingsman, and Dave being granted real superpowers by the Magic Order and becoming the superhero Codename: America, joining the superhero team The Ambassadors.

== Films ==
Film	UK release date	U.S. release date	Director	Screenwriter(s)	Producers	Status
Kick-Ass	26 March 2010	April 16, 2010	Matthew Vaughn	Jane Goldman and Matthew Vaughn	Matthew Vaughn, Brad Pitt, Kris Thykier, Adam Bohling, Tarquin Pack and David Reid	Released
Kick-Ass 2	14 August 2013	August 16, 2013	Jeff Wadlow	Jeff Wadlow	Matthew Vaughn, Adam Bohling, Tarquin Pack and David Reid	Released
Stuntnuts: The Movie	TBA	TBA	Damien Walters	Damien Walters	Matthew Vaughn and Damien Walters	Completed
Stuntnuts Does School Fight	TBA	TBA	Damien Walters	Damien Walters	Matthew Vaughn, Luke Gomes, Joby Stephens and Christopher Tomkins	Completed

=== Released ===
==== Kick-Ass (2010) ====
The first film, Kick-Ass (2010), is set over the course of two years. Using his love for comics as inspiration, teenager Dave Lizewski (Aaron Johnson) decides to reinvent himself as a superhero—despite a complete lack of special powers. Dave dons a costume, dubs himself "Kick-Ass," and gets to work fighting crime. He joins forces with the father/daughter vigilante team of Big Daddy and Hit Girl, then befriends another fledgling crime-fighter called Red Mist (Christopher Mintz-Plasse), but a scheming mobster soon puts their alliance to the test.

The rights to a film version of Kick-Ass were sold before the first issue of the comic book of the same name was initially published. Developed in parallel by Mark Millar and Matthew Vaughn, the film's script, developed by Vaughn and Jane Goldman, took a different story direction, to reach many of the same conclusions, described by Millar as a "chick flick", with Goldman doing "construction work" and the "interior designing" and Vaughn serving as the story's "architect". Vaughn said that, "We wrote the script and the comic at the same time so it was a very sort of collaborative, organic process. I met [Millar] at the premiere of Stardust. We got on really well. I knew who he was and what he had done but I didn't know him. He pitched me the idea. I said, 'That's great!' He then wrote a synopsis. I went, 'That's great, let's go do it now! You write the comic, I'll write the script.'" In April 2010, Aaron Taylor-Johnson (as Aaron Johnson), Chloë Grace Moretz and Christopher Mintz-Plasse were announced to have been respectively cast as Kick-Ass, Hit-Girl and Red Mist, having been cast in 2008; Mintz-Plasse said of the creators of the film that in the lead-up to the film's release they were wondering whether a distributor would pick up the movie. On the set Vaughn jokingly referred to Kick-Ass as something that was going to be "the most expensive home movie I ever made". Due to the subsequent popularity of the Kick-Ass film, elements of the film were incorporated into the series in Books Two and Three of The Dave Lizewski Years, with Marcus Williams, created for the film, introduced as Hit-Girl's step-father, and the relationship between Katie and Lizewski, and Kick-Ass and Red Mist being much calmer, as Millar had aligned the characters with their movie counterparts, explained in-universe as both characters having overhauled their sense of self following separate pilgrimages.

Filming locations during the principal photography stage of development included Hamilton, Ontario, Canada; Dip 'N' Sip Donuts on Kingston Road in Toronto, Sir Winston Churchill Secondary School, and "many Toronto landmarks that play cameos"; and various locations in the United Kingdom, including Elstree Studios.

==== Kick-Ass 2 (2013) ====
The second film, Kick-Ass 2 (2013) is set over the course of one year. Adapting Books Two and Three of The Dave Lizewski Years, the film follows Dave (Aaron Taylor-Johnson), aka Kick-Ass, and Mindy (Chloë Grace Moretz), aka Hit Girl, are trying to live as normal teenagers and briefly form a crime-fighting team. After Mindy is busted and forced to retire as Hit Girl, Dave joins a group of amateur superheroes led by Col. Stars and Stripes (Jim Carrey), a reformed mobster. Just as Dave and company start to make a real difference on the streets, the villain formerly known as Red Mist (Christopher Mintz-Plasse) rears his head yet again.

Near the release of Kick-Ass, Mark Millar and Matthew Vaughn stated that a sequel would be possible if the first film was to perform well at the box office, and Vaughn expressed interest in directing the sequel. On May 8, 2012, it was reported that a sequel would be distributed by Universal Studios, and that Matthew Vaughn, at the time occupied with directing Kingsman: The Secret Service, had chosen Jeff Wadlow, who also wrote the script, to direct the sequel, titled Kick-Ass 2. Later that month, Aaron Taylor-Johnson and Chloë Grace Moretz entered negotiations to reprise their roles as Kick-Ass and Hit-Girl, respectively. Chad Gomez Creasey and Dara Resnik Creasey performed uncredited work on Wadlow's script to make Hit-Girl more feminine and less crass in light of Moretz's older age. In July 2012, Christopher Mintz-Plasse confirmed that he would return as Chris D'Amico who becomes the supervillain The Motherfucker. Mintz-Plasse expressed relief that scenes depicting sexual assault from the comic book would not be included in the film and went on to compare the gang violence in the story to the film The Warriors. That same month, it was announced that John Leguizamo would play a character named Javier, one of The Motherfucker's bodyguards. In August 2012, it was reported that Donald Faison would play the superhero Doctor Gravity. Also that month, Yancy Butler was set to reprise her role as Angie D'Amico, Lyndsy Fonseca stated that she would return as Katie Deauxma in a smaller role, Robert Emms was cast as the former police officer turned superhero Insect Man, Morris Chestnut was confirmed to replace Omari Hardwick as Hit-Girl's guardian Marcus Williams, Lindy Booth was confirmed to play Night Bitch, a superhero seeking to avenge the murder of her sister, Andy Nyman was announced to play one of the villains named The Tumor, and Claudia Lee joined the cast as Brooke, the leader of a gang of school bullies.

In September 2012, Jim Carrey was cast in the role of Colonel Stars and Stripes, former gangster, born again Christian, and leader of superhero group Justice Forever. Also in September, Enzo Cilenti was confirmed to appear in the film. It was confirmed that bodybuilder Olga Kurkulina would portray the villainess Mother Russia. It was revealed that Clark Duke would reprise his role as Marty Eisenberg, who becomes the superhero Battle Guy, and that Augustus Prew would take over the role of Todd Haynes, who becomes the superhero Ass-Kicker, from Evan Peters. Principal photography began on September 7, 2012, in Mississauga, Ontario, Canada. Once filming in Mississauga wrapped in late September, the cast and crew continued shooting in London, England, at Ashmole Academy. Filming concluded on November 23, 2012.

=== Future ===
==== Stuntnuts: The Movie (TBA) ====
In January 2024, Matthew Vaughn announced that the second film in his upcoming new trilogy of Kick-Ass franchise films would be developed under the working-title of Vram. In February 2024, Vaughn revealed that the second film in the trilogy would be titled The Stuntman, and was currently in production, with Damien Walters returning to direct. Principal photography began in October 2023 in Hampshire. The film was aiming to be released at the 2024 Toronto International Film Festival or at the 2025 Sundance Film Festival. The film screened at the 2026 American Film Market on November 9, 2026. A prequel to School Fight, this film was subsequently renamed Stuntnuts, with the intent of releasing it prior to School Fight and marketing the earlier-filmed School Fight as its sequel under a new name.

==== Stuntnuts Does School Fight (TBA) ====
In December 2021, Vaughn revealed he intended to develop new Kick-Ass franchise films once the rights reverted to him in two years. By October 2023, the filmmaker stated that the new films would focus on new characters in the same world of the first two films, while intending to bring back Taylor Johnson and Grace Moretz in future films.

In January 2024, Vaughn revealed that a third installment which is intended to be the first of a new trilogy had already completed filming in 2021. Titled School Fight and directed by Damien Walters. The filmmaker later noted that the trilogy of new films share continuity, and that it is his intention of taking other creative roles and allowing his second-unit team to take on a more prominent role in filmmaking. Subsequently, Vaughn decided to release this film as the fourth film in the franchise instead of the third, to release after the fourth film made, a prequel titled Stuntnuts, while marketing School Fight as a sequel to it under a new title.

=== Development of Kick-Ass 3 ===
In April 2012, while Kick-Ass 2 was still in pre-production, Mark Millar stated that a third film was also planned. In June 2013, however, he revealed that it was not confirmed and would be dependent on how successful the second film was. Later the same month he further elaborated that if it went ahead, the third film would be the final installment: "Kick-Ass 3 is going to be the last one... I told Universal this and they asked me, 'What does that mean?' I said, 'It means that this is where it all ends.' They said, 'Do they all die at the end?' I said, 'Maybe' – because this is a realistic superhero story... if someone doesn't have a bullet proof vest like Superman, and doesn't have Batman's millions, then eventually he is going to turn around the wrong corner and get his head kicked in or get shot in the face. So Kick-Ass needs to reflect that. There has to be something dramatic at the end; he cannot do this for the rest of his life." Moretz expressed interested in exploring a darker story for Hit-Girl, stating: "I want to see something we haven't seen yet. Now we've seen who Mindy is, now we've seen who Hit-Girl is, I think we need to meld the characters together and have Mindy become Hit-Girl and Hit-Girl become Mindy. Maybe her natural hair has a streak of purple in it, maybe she really does go kind of crazy and go a bit darker since she lost her father." She also added, "I would only do the third one if it was logical. It needs to be a good script and a director, probably Matthew (Vaughn). The third film needs to fully wrap up the series and has to be a good note to end on."

In August 2013, Millar stated that the film is "in the pipeline". In May 2014, Taylor-Johnson stated he too would be interested in a third film. In the same month, Christopher Mintz-Plasse expressed doubt that a third film would happen, due to the second installment's disappointing box office performance. In June 2014, Moretz also expressed doubts in a third film, with the actress citing second film's lower box office gross as the key obstacle to the third chapter being produced; while suggesting that file sharing was a factor: "The hard thing is if fans want a third movie, they’ve got to go buy the ticket to go see the movie. It was like the second most pirated movie of the year, so if you want a movie to be made into a second, a third, a fourth and a fifth, go buy a ticket. Don't pirate it." In August 2014, Moretz reiterated her previous statements and said "sadly, I think I'm done with [Hit-Girl]".

In February 2015, Matthew Vaughn expressed optimism for a Hit-Girl prequel, stating he believed he could also bring back the starring cast. In June of the same year, Vaughn stated that he is working on the Hit-Girl film, with plans to make Kick-Ass 3 afterwards. In June 2018, the filmmaker confirmed the film to still be in development, in addition expressing interest in a sequel film with Chloë Grace Moretz reprising her role.

In January 2018, Mark Millar said that he'd like to see Tessa Thompson portray the Patience Lee incarnation of the character in a prospective third Kick-Ass film; while Thompson stated that she was "highly interested" in the role. In June 2018, Matthew Vaughn announced his new film production company Marv Studios, under which banner he will produce Kick-Ass 3, followed by a reboot of the Hit-Girl & Kick-Ass series.

=== Other films in development ===
In January 2024, upon revealing the existence of an upcoming trilogy of new Kick-Ass films and the secretly-filmed third installment titled School Fight, Matthew Vaughn also announced that the next projects would be developed under the working-titles of Vram, and another also tentatively entitled Kick-Ass. Vaughn stated in February of the same year, that though he has been involved with the filmmaking process of the trilogy, he has intended to allow his second-unit team to serve as the primary filmmakers. Confirming that Vram is near completion, he stated that once principal photography has wrapped, School Fight will be released.

A third feature, Stuntnuts Does Shiver, described as Jaws meets Groundhog Day, was announced by Vaughn in September 2024. Vaughn also confirmed a fourth film with all four to be directed by Damien Walters.

=== Cast and crew ===
==== Main cast ====
List indicators
- This table shows the recurring characters and the actors who have portrayed them throughout the franchise.
- A dark grey cell indicates the character was not in the film, or that the character's presence in the film has not yet been announced.
- A ^{D} indicates an appearance in (a) scene(s) not included in the theatrical version of the film.
- A ^{Y} indicates an appearance as a younger version of a pre-existing character.
- A ^{C} indicates a cameo appearance.
- A ^{V} indicates a voice-only role.
- An ^{A} indicates an appearance through archival footage or audio.

Characters	Released films	
Characters	Kick-Ass	Kick-Ass 2
Characters	2010	2013
Dave Lizewski Kick-Ass	Aaron Taylor-Johnson	Aaron Taylor-Johnson
Mindy Macready Hit-Girl (Note: Spelled McCready in the comic series)	Chloë Grace Moretz	Chloë Grace Moretz
Christopher "Chris" D'Amico Red Mist The Motherfucker (Note: Surname is Genovese in the comic series)	Christopher Mintz-Plasse	Christopher Mintz-Plasse
Marty Battle Guy	Clark Duke	Clark Duke
Angie D'Amico	Yancy Butler	Yancy Butler
Mr. Lizewski	Garrett M. Brown	Garrett M. Brown
Katie Deauxma	Lyndsy Fonseca	Lyndsy Fonseca
Erika Cho	Sophie Wu	Sophie Wu
Tony Romita	John Romita Jr.^{C}	John Romita Jr.^{C}
Sergeant Marcus Williams	Omari Hardwick	Morris Chestnut
Todd Haynes Ass-Kicker	Evan Peters	Augustus Prew
Scottish Drunk	Mark Millar^{DC}	Mark Millar^{C}
Damon Macready Big Daddy (Note: Spelled McCready in the comic series)	Nicolas Cage	Mentioned
Frank D'Amico (Note: Named John "Johnny" Genovese in the comic series)	Mark Strong	Mentioned
Big Joe	Michael Rispoli	
Detective Gigante	Xander Berkeley	
Ralph D'Amico	Mentioned	Iain Glen
Sal Bertolinni Colonel Stars and Stripes		Jim Carrey
Samuel Keers Doctor Gravity		Donald Faison

==== Crew ====
Occupation	Film				
Occupation	Kick-Ass (2010)	Kick-Ass 2	Stuntnuts: The Movie	Stuntnuts Does School Fight	Kick-Ass (upcoming)
Director of photography	Ben Davis	Tim Maurice Jones	Ben Davis	Nathan Claridge	TBA
Editor(s)	Jon Harris; Pietro Scalia; Eddie Hamilton	Eddie Hamilton	TBA	Ryan Axe; Ben Mills	TBA
Composer(s)	John Murphy; Henry Jackman; Marius de Vries; Ilan Eshkeri	Henry Jackman; Matthew Margeson	TBA	Steve Davis	TBA

==== Music ====
Title	U.S. release date	Length	Composer(s)	Label
Kick-Ass – Original Motion Picture Score	March 29, 2010	51:19	Mika and Jodi Marr	Polydor Ltd. Interscope
Kick-Ass 2 – Original Motion Picture Score	August 12, 2013	41:36	Mika and Jodi Marr	Sony Music Classical Sony Masterworks

=== Reception ===
==== Box office performance ====
Film	Release date		Box office gross			Box office ranking		Production budget	Ref.
Film	United States	Outside United States	North America	Other territories	Worldwide	All time North America	All time worldwide	Production budget	Ref.
Kick-Ass	April 16, 2010	March 26, 2010	$48,071,303	$48,117,600	$96,188,903	1,783	1,008	$28–30 million	
Kick-Ass 2	August 16, 2013	August 14, 2013	$28,795,985	$32,000,000	$60,795,985	2,805	1,612	$28 million	
Total			$76,867,288	$80,117,600	$156,984,888			$56–58 million	

==== Critical and public response ====
Film	Rotten Tomatoes	Metacritic	CinemaScore
Kick-Ass	76% (257 reviews)	66 (38 reviews)	B
Kick-Ass 2	32% (205 reviews)	41 (35 reviews)	B+

== Video games ==
In April 2010, it was confirmed that Kick-Ass would have a tie-in game to accompany its release, and that it would be a beat 'em up combat video game, released on iOS and PlayStation Network (PSN) developed and published by Frozen Codebase (published by WHA Entertainment for the PSN version). The iOS version of the game was released on April 17, 2010, but had since been pulled from the Apple App Market. The PlayStation Network version of the game was released on April 29, 2010, in North America and May 5, 2010, in Europe. On August 14, 2014, Freedom Factory Studios released a beat 'em up sequel, Kick-Ass 2: The Game, based on the movie Kick-Ass 2.

== Merchandise ==
Funko released Pop! Wacky Wobbler bobblehead figures of Kick-Ass, Hit-Girl and Red Mist in 2011.
