= Kick-Ass (character) =

Three superheroes created by Mark Millar

- Millarworld character
- First appearance: Dave Lizewski: The Dave Lizewski Years: Book One #1 (February 2008) Paul McQue: The Dave Lizewski Years: Book Four #8 (August 2014) Patience Lee: The New Girl #1 (February 2018)
- Last appearance: Dave Lizewski: Big Game #5 (November 2023) Paul McQue: Hit-Girl in Colombia #1 (February 2018) Patience Lee: Kick-Ass vs. Hit-Girl #5 (March 2021)
- Created by: Mark Millar; John Romita Jr.
- Portrayed by: Aaron Taylor-Johnson (Dave Lizewski)

In-universe information
- Full name: David "Dave" Lizewski; Paul McQue; Patience Lee
- Occupation: Dave Lizewski: High School Student (Vol. 1–3); Vigilante/superhero; NYPD Police Officer (Vol. 4); American Ambassador (Big Game) Patience Lee: Afghanistan War Veteran; Crime Boss/supervillain
- Family: Dave Lizewski: James Lizewski (father, deceased); Alice Lizewski (mother, deceased) Patience Lee: Jordan "Jordy" Lee (son); Grace Lee (daughter); Edwina (sister); Unnamed Parents; Frankie (ex-husband); Maurice (brother-in-law, deceased)
- Abilities: 85% insensitivity to pain, hand-to-hand combatant, baton swinging and flailing

Kick-Ass is the name of three fictional characters serving as the title characters and the protagonists of the Kick-Ass series, published by Marvel Comics under the company’s imprint Icon Comics, and by Image Comics, all created by artist John Romita Jr. and writer Mark Millar. The first Kick-Ass, the protagonist of Kick-Ass – The Dave Lizewski Years David "Dave" Lizewski, is an initially 15-year-old high school student and comic book fan whose dreams inspire him to become a real-life superhero dubbed "Kick-Ass", partnering and later training under Mindy McCready / Hit-Girl. The second Kick-Ass, a supporting character in Hit-Girl, Paul McQue, is an initially 12-year-old middle school student bullied at school, whom Mindy recruits after Dave's retirement. The third Kick-Ass, the villain protagonist of Kick-Ass – The New Girl, Patience Lee, is an Afghanistan war veteran and single mother who dons the Kick-Ass costume and mantle to steal money from various crime bosses for her family, before becoming a crime boss/supervillain herself, leading to Mindy hunting her down in Kick-Ass vs. Hit-Girl. In Big Game, Dave comes out of retirement after being granted real superpowers by the Magic Order to take on the joint forces of a time-travelling alien armada from the past and Wesley Gibson's Fraternity of Super-Criminals, before joining the superhero team The Ambassadors as Codename: America.

Dave Lizewski / Kick-Ass is portrayed by Aaron Taylor-Johnson in the feature films Kick-Ass (2010) and Kick Ass 2 (2013) and the video games Kick-Ass: The Game (2010) and Kick-Ass 2: The Game (2014).

== Fictional character biography ==
=== Dave Lizewski ===
Dave Lizewski is a simple ordinary New York City high school student. His mother dies of a brain aneurysm and Dave serves as an anchor to reality for his loving, single widowed father. Dave takes an interest in comic books, which give him the idea to become a real-life superhero. He purchases a suit and mask, which he wears under his normal clothing, and he begins his own personal training before attempting to fight crime. His first attempt fails, with disastrous results as Dave is hospitalized following being stabbed and being hit by a car. Dave lies to his father, claiming he was mugged. He undergoes intense physical rehabilitation, including four operations. He is released weeks later, with metal plates all over his body and with his nerve endings having delayed reactions to pain, making him almost immune to conventional beatings. In spite of considering giving up crime-fighting, he soon returns to the streets. Kick-Ass rescues a man from a beating and fights off the thugs. An onlooker records the incident and uploads it on YouTube, turning Lizewski into an overnight sensation, given the name Kick-Ass.

Kick-Ass becomes an inspiration for hundreds of people, most of whom are content to simply make web pages and costumes, but some of whom actually go out and effectively fight crime. Kick-Ass encounters two other crime-fighting heroes who call themselves Hit-Girl and Big Daddy, whose level of professionalism intimidates Kick-Ass and also serves to remind him just how serious crime-fighting can be. He retires from crime-fighting for a little while until he becomes aware of another hero, who calls himself Red Mist, who has become a sensation, even stealing all the credit for being the first-ever superhero. Kick-Ass subsequently leaves retirement, initially to challenge Red Mist, but instead, they team up. As they drive off they come across a burning building. Kick-Ass overhears a woman saying that her "baby" is still inside. Kick-Ass bravely enters the building with Red-Mist to rescue the baby, only to find out it is a cat called "Baby"; they rescue it and return it to its owner.

Red Mist, however, turns out to be the son of mob boss John Genovese which leads to Big Daddy's death and the torture of Kick-Ass at the hands of various gangsters. Before long, Kick-Ass is rescued by Hit-Girl and the two get their revenge on John Genovese, together bringing down his entire organization. Kick-Ass shoots John Genovese's genitals off with a gun through a pure fluke, giving Hit-Girl an open opportunity to kill John Genovese with a cleaver. After the loss of Mindy's father, Dave drops her off at her mother's house. Dave returns home to find his father having sex with his teacher (whose boyfriend Hit-Girl had killed) on the couch.

Hit-Girl subsequently takes on Kick-Ass as her crime-fighting partner, training him and using him to hunt criminals together with her. She also gets him to teach her how to be a normal kid, and get along with other girls somewhat older than herself.

Dave returns to training and fighting crime in New York City and is now being trained by Hit-Girl. Kick-Ass joins a new superhero team calling themselves Justice Forever, which includes his friends Marty and Todd, and his new crime-fighting ally, "Doctor Gravity". Led by the repentant born-again Christian "Colonel Stars", the group launches a campaign against the local crime families of the city. He now works frequently on gang-busting with his new-found team, as well as his long-time friend Marty as "Battle Guy", sharing inside crime-fighting jokes with him during his school life. He and the team break into a bar and apprehend a gang. Dave goes home to see that his dad has found his Kick-Ass costume and isn't happy about it. They argue about him being a hero, which leads Dave to storm out of the house.

The massacre leads the police (led by Detective Vic Gigante, who secretly works for the Motherfucker as a mob informant) to scapegoat the super-heroes for the deaths. All known heroes are rounded up and put into police custody, including the members of Justice Forever. Kick-Ass avoids arrest due to his father, who discovers his son's super-hero alter ego, much to his horror. Despite his disapproval, Kick-Ass's father turns himself in to the authorities to save his son from arrest. Shortly after, he is attacked by mob henchmen of the Motherfucker, who kill him as part of the villain's campaign to torment his rival. The Motherfucker then attacks the funeral, detonating a bomb in Kick-Ass's father's coffin and has gunmen open fire upon the crowd of mourners, including Hit-Girl and her family. In response, Hit-Girl springs into action to kill the henchmen who kidnap Kick-Ass in the confusion.

Kick-Ass and Hit-Girl team up as they raid the Motherfucker's lair and find out that the villain plans a second massacre in Times Square. Blowing up every single comic shop in New York (along with Kick-Ass's apartment), the Motherfucker seeks to create a distraction to ensure the police will not be around to keep the Motherfucker and his group from slaughtering every person in Times Square. Using social media, Kick-Ass alerts all of the heroes still free to meet with him in Times Square to fight the Motherfucker's minions. The Motherfucker starts his killing spree, only to be stopped by the army of heroes backing up Kick-Ass. As the police arrive on scene unable to tell the heroes from members of the Motherfucker's group, they proceed to arrest all the remaining masked combatants, allowing Motherfucker to escape. Kick-Ass chases after him and after a rooftop fight, Motherfucker falls to the ground, mortally wounded. Reluctantly, Kick-Ass summons help but gets accused of attempting to kill his rival.

Dave graduates from high school and continues his life as a superhero in his battle against organized crime. As he plans to break Mindy out of prison, he asks Justice Forever for assistance, but they refuse to help. After a fight with a gang of criminals, Dave meets a woman named Valerie and starts dating her. At a party to celebrate Chris' release, Kick-Ass arranges to get the members of Justice Forever to help him raid the party and send a warning to the mob. The plan fails when Kick-Ass' friends flee in the face of mob retaliation. Elsewhere, Mindy confides to her psychiatrist that she has circumvented the prison's security so as to allow her to wander around and kill problematic inmates at night. Furthermore, she talks about how her father created his false backstory in order to manipulate her into continuing her career as Hit-Girl. Mindy also meets her mother, who is proud of her actions as Hit-Girl.

Gigante and three disguised cops rob Rocco, intending to make a fortune and leave New York. In response, Rocco orders the killing of everyone found in a mask, resulting in the deaths of four Justice Forever members and the kidnapping of Dave's roommate Todd. Later Kick-Ass rescues Mindy from a cop working for Rocco, brutally killing him. Dave goes to rescue Todd in Big Daddy's monster truck. Dave is briefly overpowered by the thugs holding Todd, but ends up electrocuting them all. Dave decides to abandon his superhero identity, instead joining the police and remaining with Valerie. Marcus is cleared of all charges thanks to Gigante's testimony and has rooted out the remaining corrupt elements from the force. Dave never sees Mindy again, though he does hear of her further exploits across the world and the emergence of genuine superhumans. Ten years later, Dave comes out of retirement after being granted real superpowers by the Magic Order to take on the joint forces of a time-travelling alien armada from the past and Wesley Gibson's Fraternity of Super-Criminals, before joining the superhero team The Ambassadors as "Codename: America".

=== Paul McQue ===
Paul McQue is a simple ordinary Pittsburgh middle school student. Bullied at school for his father have left Paul and his mother for his boyfriend, often beaten up, Paul is recruited by Mindy as a successor to the mantle of Kick-Ass to continue Dave's legacy. On Paul's request, Mindy later allows him a sabbatical from the mantle to spend more time with his mother while she travels the world on her endless war against crime.

=== Patience Lee ===
Patience Lee is an Afghanistan war veteran who returns to find her husband has left her and run up large debts. She decides to steal cash from the people ruining the neighborhood, pay off her debts and give half away. She dons the Kick-Ass costume and allows herself to be caught. Once inside she uses her combat skills to take down the gangsters, and forces the boss at gunpoint to hand over all the money; after said boss sends gangsters after Patience's family, she kills them and the boss before taking over his operations as a new crime boss under the "Kick-Ass" name.

== Skills and abilities ==
=== Dave Lizewski ===
After his first unsuccessful attempt at being a superhero ends in being beaten, mugged and hit by a moving car, Dave has several metal plates and braces surgically implanted within his body during the course of his hospitalization and recovery. This, along with the nerve damage he suffers during the event, provides him with the ability to be almost immune to pain, giving him an edge while fighting. His only weapons are his twin batons that are wrapped in green electrical tape. In the sixth issue of Kick-Ass 2, he upgraded his twin batons by adding barbed wire around them. In the film version of Kick-Ass, he becomes adept at handling firearms. Due to not having fighting experiences in his life, he receives hand-to-hand combat training from Hit-Girl. In Big Game, he is instilled with one of the Ambassadors' super-suits by Cordelia Moonstone, granting him peak human strength and limited flight via the suit.

=== Paul McQue ===
On being recruited by Hit-Girl, Paul receives hand-to-hand combat training from her, learning to avoid attacks by her "tossing tennis balls" at him.

=== Patience Lee ===
Patience Lee is a former member of the 160th Special Operations Aviation Regiment (Airborne), nicknamed The Night Stalkers. She is a highly trained soldier and proficient in hand-to-hand combat as well as with melee weapons & firearms. She is also a skilled tactician.

== Family ==
=== Dave Lizewski ===
At the start of the first comic series, Dave’s mother, Alice Lizewski, died of a brain aneurysm when Dave was 14. Dave lives with his father, James Lizewski, after his mother died. Dave and his father had a very strong, close relationship. He is fully aware of his secret in Kick-Ass 2. He is beaten to death and hanged by Chris Genovese (aka The Motherfucker, formerly Red Mist) while in prison after he tells the police that he is Kick-Ass.

=== Paul McQue ===
At the end of The Davie Lizewski Years, Paul is established as a middle school student whose father had recently left him and his mother alone, with the 12-year-old being bullied as a result, in particular for Paul's father having begun dating a man. In Hit-Girl, when Mindy goes abroad to follow a revenge request, Paul offers for his mother to drive her where she wants to go.

=== Patience Lee ===
Patience was originally married to Frankie Lee. They divorce as he abandons her once she returns from her Army tour in Afghanistan, leaving her a single mother to their son Jordan "Jordy", and daughter Grace. When Patience takes over the criminal empire of one of the gangsters she defeated, she starts being blackmailed by her ex-brother-in-law, Maurice. The names of her parents are never given, but she does have a sister named Edwina.

== In other media ==
=== Films ===
The Dave Lizewski incarnation of Kick-Ass appears in the 2010 film adaptation Kick-Ass, and the 2013 sequel Kick-Ass 2. Aaron Johnson, who plays the character, says that Kick-Ass is a "sensitive guy" who lost his mother and is a "nobody" at school, so he creates his superhero identity "as this whole different persona". Johnson said that Dave is "a kid who's got the guts to go out there and do something different." In preparation for the role, Johnson received fitness and stunt training, and did a couple of weeks of fight choreography. He also requires a dialect coach for the American accent to suit the character.

In 2018, Mark Millar said that he'd like to see Tessa Thompson portray the Patience Lee incarnation of the character in a prospective third Kick-Ass film, Thompson stating that she was "highly interested" in the role.

=== Video games ===
The Dave Lizewski incarnation of Kick-Ass appears as a playable character in Kick-Ass: The Game and Kick-Ass 2: The Game, each respectively based on the two films.

=== Toys ===
In 2010, Mezco released Kick-Ass figures based on the first film and followed-up with new figures released in 2013 by Neca.
