= Hit-Girl (comic book) =

Comic book limited series

- Cover of Hit Girl vs. Colombia (2018)

Publication information
- Publisher: Image Comics
- Genre: Superhero
- Publication date: February 21, 2018 – January 15, 2020
- No. of issues: 24
- Main character: Mindy McCready / Hit-Girl

Creative team
- Created by: Mark Millar; John Romita Jr.
- Written by: Mark Millar; Jeff Lemire; Rafael Albuquerque; Rafael Scavone; Kevin Smith; Daniel Way; Pete Milligan
- Pencillers: Ricardo Lopez Ortiz; Eduardo Risso; Rafael Albuquerque; Pernille Ørum; Goran Barlov; Alison Sampson

Hit-Girl is a creator-owned comic book sequel series to Kick-Ass: The Dave Lizewski Years, created by Mark Millar and illustrated by John Romita Jr., part of the Kick-Ass franchise and set in the Millarworld. The series was published by Image Comics from 2018 to 2020. The title, featuring a successive change of writers and artists for each four-issue story arc, follows Mindy McCready / Hit-Girl leaving the United States to carry on her fight for justice on a worldwide scale, depicting events mentioned in the epilogue of Book Four of The Dave Lizewski Years. It was followed by Kick-Ass vs. Hit-Girl and Big Game.

== Synopsis ==
=== Season One ===
The first series of Hit-Girl is retroactively referred to as Hit-Girl: Season One following the release of the second series, titled Hit-Girl: Season Two.

==== Colombia ====
In Hit-Girl, Vol. 1: In Colombia, or Hit-Girl vs. Colombia, Hit-Girl leaves New York behind to dispense justice to gangland country Colombia. After mother seeks Hit-Girl's help to avenge her child's murder, Hit-Girl blackmails Colombia's most notorious hitman into helping her kill every criminal in the country.

==== Canada ====
In Hit-Girl, Vol. 2: In Canada, or Hit-Girl vs. Canada, Hit-Girl ventures to snow-covered Canada to slaughter a corrupt Canadian government and crime syndicate, after accidentally massacring servicemen of the Mounties.

==== Rome ====
In Hit-Girl, Vol. 3: In Rome, or Hit-Girl vs. Rome, Hit-Girl is stranded in Rome while pursuing a thief, facing off against the supernatural forces of the crime boss nun overseeing the Vatican, who seeks out the golden skull of the Saint of Killers, which will allow her redemption to enter Heaven.

=== Season Two ===
==== Hollywood ====
In February 2019, the series restarted under the title Hit-Girl: Season 2. The first issue featured the Kevin Smith storyline spoken about when the first series was first announced, Hit-Girl In Hollywood, also known as Hit-Girl vs. Hollywood and Hit-Girl: The Golden Rage of Hollywood (stylised as Hit-Girl in... The Golden Rage of Hollywood), a 'remake' of Smith's film Jay & Silent Bob Strike Back but starring Hit-Girl instead of Jay and Silent Bob. The plot revolves around Hit-Girl's infamy having grown to legendary proportions thanks to a bestseller book, which is about to be adapted into a movie, prompting Hit-Girl to go to Hollywood and settle the matter her style. However, as she soon discovers, the movie is not going to be the only copy of her life's story.

==== Hong Kong ====
In Hit-Girl, Vol. 5: In Hong Kong, or Hit-Girl vs. Hong Kong, Hit-Girl ventures to Hong Kong to dismantle the Liu Triad, the criminal organisation in charge of Southeast Asia. after murdering leader Boss Liu, Mindy learns he had been an innocent puppet for his little sister, the actual ruler of the criminal underworld, finding she may have met her match in capacity for cruelty.

==== India ====
In Hit-Girl, Vol. 6: In India, or Hit-Girl vs. India, Hit-Girl travels to the desolate slums of India, slaughtering the masterminds behind the city's begging industry, facing Hijra assassins, and training other children to pick up in her stead once she leaves the country behind.

=== Kick-Ass vs. Hit-Girl ===
The first issue of Kick-Ass vs. Hit-Girl, a five-issue crossover between Hit-Girl and the supervillainous Patience Lee incarnation of Kick-Ass (written by Steve Niles, art by Marcelo Frusin), was published on November 11, 2020, seeing Mindy return to America to kill Patience. The series concluded with the release of the fifth issue on April 11, 2021, and was collected as the fourth volume of Kick-Ass – The New Girl.

== Reception ==
Hit-Girl was well-received for its complex stories that deal with difficult subjects, something which reflected by the mature art style of every arc bar Hit-Girl vs. Hollywood, the first arc of Season Two of the series. Hit-Girl was called "visually stunning" by Darryll Robson of MonkeysFightingRobots.

== In other media ==
In January 2019, Kevin Smith expressed interest in Hit-Girl vs. Hollywood receiving a film adaptation, with "a woman [being] in charge" of production.
