= Kick-Ass – The Dave Lizewski Years =

Comic book series by Mark Millar and John Romita Jr.

- Covers of Kick-Ass – The Dave Lizewski Years, Books One to Four. Art by John Romita Jr.

Publication information
- Publisher: Marvel Comics
- Schedule: Bimonthly (irregular)
- Format: Ongoing series
- Genre: Superhero
- Publication date: February 2008 – August 2014
- No. of issues: 29
- Main character(s): Dave Lizewski / Kick-Ass; Mindy McCready / Hit-Girl; Chris Genovese / Red Mist

Creative team
- Created by: Mark Millar; John Romita Jr.
- Written by: Mark Millar
- Penciller: John Romita Jr.
- Inker: Tom Palmer
- Colorist: Dean White
- Editor: John Barber

Collected editions
- Book One: ISBN 0-7851-3261-9
- Book Two: ISBN 1-5343-0720-6
- Book Three: ISBN 1-5343-0721-4
- Book Four: ISBN 1-5343-0722-2

Kick-Ass – The Dave Lizewski Years (originally published simply as Kick-Ass, and as Hit-Girl for Book Two) is a creator-owned comic book series written by Mark Millar and illustrated by John Romita Jr. The first installment of the Kick-Ass franchise, it was initially published by Marvel Comics under the company's Icon imprint and republished under Image Comics. Set in the Millarworld, the series primarily tells the story of Dave Lizewski, a teenager who sets out to become a real life superhero. His actions are publicized on the Internet and inspire other people. He gets caught up with ruthless vigilantes Big Daddy and Mindy "Hit-Girl" McCready, who are on a mission to take down the Genovese crime family. Two stand-alone sequel series, Hit-Girl and Kick-Ass – The New Girl, respectively following Mindy and new villain protagonist Patience Lee, began publication in February 2018, before jointly concluding with the crossover miniseries Kick-Ass vs. Hit-Girl in March 2021. A further crossover, Big Game, was published from July to November 2023, following a now mid-20s Mindy as she teams up with Kingsman agent Eggsy Unwin against Wesley Gibson, while Dave is granted superpowers by the Magic Order.

The first volume of the series was adapted into a film directed by Matthew Vaughn and starring Aaron Taylor-Johnson in the title role and Chloë Grace Moretz as Hit-Girl, released in 2010. A sequel, directed by Jeff Wadlow and adapting the second and third volumes of the series, was released in 2013. A third and fourth film, Stuntnuts: The Movie and Stuntnuts Does School Fight, directed by Damien Walters, will be released respectively, with a fifth in pre-production.

== Plot ==
=== Book One ===
The first volume of The Dave Lizewski Years, originally titled Kick-Ass, is set over the course of two years. Dave Lizewski, an otherwise ordinary New York City high school student, comic book fan, and the child of James Lizewski, a loving single father, and his deceased via brain hemorrhage mother, ponders the absence of costumed vigilantes in the real world while "some Armenian guy" in a superhero outfit leaps from the rooftop of a skyscraper, fails to take flight, and plunges to his death on a car on the street below in front of a crowd of onlookers. Months earlier, Dave buys a wetsuit from the website eBay, which he wears under his normal clothing, begins exercising, and practices things like walking on roofs, satisfying his ambitions to become a real-life superhero for a time. He eventually seeks to actually fight crime, with his first attempt leading him to receive a severe beating and stabbing by thugs, followed by his wandering into the street and being hit by a car. He retains his secret identity by stripping off and hiding his costume before paramedics arrive.

Telling his father he was mugged, he undergoes intense physical rehabilitation, including four operations. He is released months later, and as soon as he is off crutches dons the suit once more and goes on patrol. When he saves a man from a beating, an onlooker records the incident and uploads it to YouTube, turning Dave into an overnight sensation dubbed with the name "Kick-Ass". Local mob boss John Genovese is annoyed by Kick-Ass' appearance, as his business has been disrupted by other vigilantes.

In school, the mugging excuse used to cover up his injuries for a second time spawns rumors Dave is a homosexual prostitute. Believing them, his longtime crush, Katie Deauxma, adopts him as a "gay best friend". Dave goes along with this in an effort to spend time with her. The continued patrolling takes its toll on Dave, and his father, worried about him, gives him a can of police-issue pepper spray for protection.

As Kick-Ass, Dave sets up a Myspace account, so people can contact him for help. The first such request he investigates is a man called Eddie Lomas who has been harassing his ex-girlfriend, which leads Kick-Ass to an apartment of violent lowlifes who try to kill him. He is rescued by a costumed, blade-wielding young girl named Hit-Girl, real name Mindy McCready, who brutally kills all the attackers and then leaves to join a grown man, named Big Daddy McCready, also wearing a superhero costume. The two disregard Dave, who later learns that Kick-Ass has inadvertently inspired a subculture of people dressed in makeshift, original superhero costumes. Later, one such hero, the Red Mist, appears. He partners with Kick-Ass on street patrol and the two happen upon a burning building. When a woman begs them to save her "baby", Kick-Ass drags a very reluctant Red Mist into the building, only to discover that the "baby" is actually a kitten. Although the two are nearly killed while saving the kitten, they gain great public popularity after the rescue.

Hit-Girl later insists to her father that they form a "super-team" with Kick-Ass and Red Mist, and Big Daddy reluctantly complies. Big Daddy is revealed to the reader to be "a good cop in a bad city", whose wife was killed because he would not accept bribes from criminals. He escaped with his baby daughter and plotted revenge, turning himself and his child into lethal crimefighters. At the behest of Big Daddy and Hit-Girl, Kick-Ass accompanies Red Mist to meet the duo at an abandoned warehouse to strategize the takedown of John Genovese. There they find Big Daddy and Hit-Girl captured, and Red Mist reveals himself as Genovese's son, who had orchestrated this ambush. Hit-Girl is apparently killed after being shot multiple times and falling through a window. Tortured, Big Daddy reveals he is not an ex-cop at all but an accountant frustrated with his marriage, who took his daughter and left his empty life to create a new one, financing himself through selling comic books. He chose Genovese as a target because he and Hit-Girl "needed a villain". The gang kills Big Daddy and tortures Kick-Ass. Hit-Girl, who is alive due to body armor, saves Kick-Ass. Hit-Girl and Kick-Ass attack Genovese's headquarters. Hit-Girl kills most of the henchmen, while Kick-Ass beats Red Mist unconscious. Genovese and his remaining thugs manage to capture Hit-Girl, but Kick-Ass comes to the rescue armed with a gun and shoots Genovese's penis. Hit-Girl finishes off Genovese with a meat cleaver and guns down the remaining henchmen.

Dave's life does not improve although he helps Mindy return to a normal, calm life with her mother (who, contrary to what Big Daddy had said, is very much alive) and stepfather. Dave reveals to Katie Deauxma that he is not gay, and confesses his love for her, but she is outraged at his lying and has her new boyfriend Carl punch Dave before sending him a picture of herself performing oral sex on Carl. When he comes home, he walks in on his father having sex with Eddie Lomas' ex-girlfriend Lucille. Despite all of this, he remains optimistic, as he is no longer a loser but a cultural phenomenon.

The main story ends with a would-be superhero (who tried to fly at the start of the story) taking an elevator to the top floor of a building. The epilogue shows Red Mist at a computer in a different costume. He sends a vengeful e-mail to Kick-Ass that has the 1989 Batman film Joker quote: "Wait until they get a load of me."

=== Book Two ===
Book Two of The Dave Lizewski Years, originally titled Hit-Girl, was published after Book Three.

Set several months after Book One, Book Two follows Mindy McCready as she adjusts to home life. As mobsters beat and kill costumed vigilante Silver Beatle for information about the now-retired Kick-Ass and Hit-Girl, Mindy McCready's stepfather, Marcus Williams watches a news broadcast concerning the murder, prompting a response from a spokesman for the real-life superhero movement. Upstairs, Mindy considers the differences between her life being trained as a superhero by her father and her life now. At the bus stop, she is mocked by classmate Debbie Foreman for her clothing but muses to herself that she will get to be Hit-Girl again that night. At school, Mindy discusses her plans to suit up alongside Dave, citing that as John Genovese's brother Ralphie has seized control of the Genovese crime family, which he runs entirely from his jail cell, there is a need for them to return.

Mindy later visits her father's grave and laments that even with all of her superhero training, being able to kill without a care, she doesn't know how to handle Debbie's bullying. In his cell at Rikers Island, Ralphie Genovese instructs his crew to find Kick-Ass and to locate his nephew, Chris. When Kick-Ass arrives at the safe house, Hit-Girl gives him a tour of the facility, explaining that the equipment was purchased with the money she and her father "Big Daddy" had liberated from various pimps and pushers over the years. Hit-Girl then agrees to train Kick-Ass as she was trained in exchange for him teaching her "how to be normal". Dave agrees and is officially sworn in as Hit-Girl's sidekick/trainer.

At Red Mist's old boathouse, Chris visits his concerned mother in costume, informing her that he has come to pick up his comics and that he has become the first of the supervillains. He swears that he will avenge his father's death before taking over the family business as his father's heir, and explains that he plans to commit the first super-crime.

At night, Mindy and Dave "go fishing" for criminals in order to hone their street-fighting skills: using themselves as bait, they quickly attract four muggers, and Mindy times Dave while he incapacitates them. Later, they practice swinging between buildings and crashing through windows at an abandoned warehouse, while also working on opening lines for Dave to use while breaking into criminals' hideouts.

During the day, Dave instructs Mindy on what clothes to buy and what television shows and movies to watch, and Mindy realizes that blending in with other teenagers is just another "undercover operation", resolving to learn how to be a Mean Girl or a Queen Bee. At home, Mindy overhears her mother and Marcus discussing attempts by the mob to infiltrate the police department, but Marcus denies that anything at work has changed; privately, he admits that he knows about Mindy's superhero alter-ego, and orders her to retire for her mother's sake. Mindy promises, but Marcus and her mother promptly pass out, having been drugged with a dose of Rophynol that Mindy slipped into their cocoa. In an alley, Kick-Ass meets up with Hit-Girl, and the two set out in her car toward a restaurant where they interrupt a meeting of Russian and Italian mobsters. Kick-Ass crashes through the window and pummels several gangsters, breaking his hand before Hit-Girl opens fire from beneath a table with an M16 rifle, killing a dozen mobsters. The two then flee the restaurant, heading to the hospital.

At a convenience store, Red Mist and his two henchmen prepare to commit the first super-crime. Inside, Red Mist confirms that the surveillance cameras are operating and points an XM-25 machine gun at the store owner, shooting and killing him. However, as his henchmen abandon him, Red Mist promptly crashes into a pair of costumed heroes and is beaten up by the owner's sons before being arrested. Later, at JFK International Airport, corrupt police officer Vic Gigante informs Chris that he would have ended up at Riker's Island alongside his uncle if his arresting officers hadn't been on Ralphie Genovese's payroll. Vic gives Chris a ticket out of the country and a billfold filled with credit cards and a passport; recognizing his own weaknesses, Chris vows to travel the world and train until he becomes the perfect supervillain for Kick-Ass.

At her home, Mindy prepares for school, spending almost two hours on her hair, makeup and clothes before leaving for the bus stop. When she arrives, however, Debbie mocks her efforts. At school, Mindy learns that Dave will not be able to help her attack a Colombian drug mill that night because of his broken hand that requires two months of recovery. Fed up with Debbie's bullying, Mindy knocks her out with a taser in the bathroom and dangles her off of the roof of a recycling Center. As the latter begs for her life Mindy drops her safely into a passing recycling truck, warning that she will not wait for the truck again if Debbie picks on anyone else, and instructing Debbie to bring her friends to Mindy's house that weekend for a sleepover, to which Debbie fearfully agrees.

At their home, Mindy's mother accuses Marcus of lying to her, showing him an envelope that was delivered to the house containing three bullets labeled "Mommy Bear", "Daddy Bear", and "Baby Bear". At the 5th Precinct building, Marcus confronts Gigante, telling his supervisor to inform Genovese not to threaten his family; Marcus then storms out of the office as Gigante suggests that he not "do anything stupid". That night, while Marcus works a double shift, Mindy drugs her mother and sneaks out as Hit-Girl, heading to an abandoned warehouse to single-handedly attack a Colombian heroin cartel run by Leopoldo Urena. She discovers a few young girls inside bagging the drugs, and opts to infiltrate the warehouse rather than torch the entire building.

At a warehouse, Mindy tumbles into a room of waiting gunmen, and reveals a digital grenade that she has set on a thirty-second timer; the men attempt to flee, but Hit-Girl shoots them out at the knees. Outside, Marcus coordinates a S.W.A.T. team to infiltrate the warehouse, but the door bursts open and the girls rush out of the building shortly before it explodes. A surviving dealer tells the police that a "little girl in the costume" murdered everyone, and Marcus realizes that Mindy attacked the cartel. He rushes back to his house in a squad car while Mindy narrowly manages to get home before Marcus, who finds her in bed. The next morning, Mindy discusses her near-miss with Dave, and explains her plans to cripple the Genovese criminal empire within the next month by executing eleven more hits and killing each goon in a different manner.

At Ryker's Island, Ralphie Genovese watches a news broadcast concerning the warehouse explosion while taking a call from Gigante who, along with Genovese's men, has captured and interrogated another hero. Gigante admits that the hero knows nothing, and Genovese decides that Marcus may be behind all of their other problems and needs to be made an example of. From a martial arts facility in Asia, Chris Genovese taunts Kick-Ass in an Internet forum, explaining that he's at learning how to fight. Later, Chris is sent to the top of the mountain by his sensei to retrieve the "blue lotus"; after Chris sets out, his sensei admits to another instructor that they're scamming him.

At the Williams residence, a team of Genovese's men prepare an assault on Marcus. Inside, Mindy watches as Marcus installs new locks on all the doors and windows, disconnects her computer, and stores away all of her comic books. In the kitchen, Marcus comforts his wife as she mentions the three bullets until four armed men barge into the house. One of the men pistol whips Marcus, then holds Mindy at gunpoint and orders Marcus to beg for the girl's life before realizing that both Marcus and his wife have fallen asleep. Mindy admits to having drugged them before brutally killing the men.

Standing amidst the carnage, Mindy sees a vision of her father, who suggests that she take the opportunity to unleash a massive wave of strategic hits against Ralphie Genovese's operations. Mindy agrees and proceeds to assassinate eight crime bosses in one night before sneaking into Riker's Island on the laundry truck, incapacitate the guards with knock-out gas, stab Ralphie Genovese's bodyguard, and handcuff Genovese himself to his bunk. Informing him that she has murdered his entire chain-of-command, she shows him the "Baby Bear" bullet before shooting him in the head and killing the rest of the prisoners before leaving.

Back at home, the police and fire department arrive and Marcus takes responsibility for the four dead men in his kitchen. Mindy realizes how fragile her mother has become, and sincerely promises Marcus that it's over and resolves to retire and focus on schoolwork, even as brand new heroes began appearing and Red Mist's "super-crime" video going viral.

Meanwhile, at his school, Chris believes that he is ready to fight, but is quickly overpowered and pummeled by his instructors. Chris accuses the sensei of ripping him off, and storms out of the school, claiming that he'll just hire bodyguards to kill Kick-Ass and Hit-Girl for him. One month later, Mindy finds Kick-Ass in an alley after he gets beaten by a shoplifter. She admits that though she wishes she could suit up again, she gave Marcus her word that she wouldn't and tells Kick-Ass that she will still train him, however, beginning at nine o'clock the next morning.

At a nightclub in Eastern Europe, Chris learns from his henchmen that his following on Twitter has grown incredibly and that they have hired a Russian fighter to work as his bodyguard. Suddenly, Chris remembers Kick-Ass's secret identity.

=== Book Three ===
By the beginning of Book Three of The Dave Lizewski Years, originally titled Kick-Ass 2, Kick-Ass is training and fighting crime in New York City. Hit-Girl meanwhile is in a state of forced retirement, having been reunited with her biological mother. Her new step-father Marcus Williams, a former ally of her father Big Daddy, seeks to reintegrate Hit-Girl back into society as a normal girl. Though she continues to train Kick-Ass, Hit-Girl reluctantly obeys her step-father's wish for her to have a normal life.

Kick-Ass eventually joins 'Justice Forever', a superhero team of which his friends Marty and later Todd are members. Led by the repentant born-again Christian "Colonel Stars", the group launches a campaign against the local crime families of the city. Behind the scenes, the Red Mist (now using the code name "The Motherfucker") has begun recruiting his own group of villains using social media and his father's wealth. Together, the group (known as "The Toxic Mega-Cunts") brutally murder Colonel Stars by cutting off his head, inserting his dog's head on his body, and then launching a full-on assault upon the suburban neighborhood where Katie Deauxma (Kick-Ass's unrequited crush) lives. Nearly a hundred innocent children, police officers, and Katie's father are sadistically killed by The Motherfucker and his henchmen, who then rape and beat Katie, putting her in the hospital.

The massacre leads the police (led by Detective Vic Gigante, who secretly works for The Motherfucker as a mob informant) to scapegoat the super-heroes for the deaths. All known heroes are rounded up and put into police custody, including the members of Justice Forever. Kick-Ass avoids arrest due to his father, who discovers his son's super-hero alter-ego, much to his horror. Despite his disapproval, Kick-Ass's father turns himself in to the authorities to save his son from arrest. Shortly after, he is attacked by mob henchmen of the Motherfucker, who kill him as part of the villain's campaign to torment his rival. The Motherfucker then attacks the funeral, detonating a bomb in Kick-Ass's father's coffin and has gunmen open fire upon the crowd of mourners, including Hit-Girl and her family. In response, Hit-Girl springs into action to kill the henchmen who kidnap Kick-Ass in the confusion.

Now out of retirement and desiring revenge, Hit-Girl joins Kick-Ass as they raid The Motherfucker's lair and finds out that the villain plans a second massacre in Times Square. Blowing up every single comic shop in New York (along with Kick-Ass's apartment), the Motherfucker seeks to create a distraction to ensure the police will not be around to keep the Motherfucker and his group from slaughtering every living soul in Times Square. Using social media, Kick-Ass alerts all of the heroes still free to meet with him in Times Square to fight the Motherfucker's minions. Meanwhile, Hit-Girl alerts her step-father of the plot to distract the police with the bombings, so they can help the heroes fight them.

In Times Square, the Motherfucker starts his killing spree, only to be stopped by the army of heroes backing Kick-Ass. While Hit-Girl kills and decapitates Motherfucker's bodyguard "Mother Russia", the police arrive. Unable to tell the heroes from members of the Motherfucker's group, they proceed to arrest all the remaining masked combatants, allowing Motherfucker to escape. Kick-Ass chases after him and after a rooftop fight, Motherfucker falls to the ground mortally wounded. Reluctantly, Kick-Ass summons help but gets accused of attempting to kill his rival. Hit-Girl spirits him away and the rescuers only see the young heroine, who is promptly blamed for the crime.

Once Kick-Ass is safe, Hit-Girl steals a police car in order to escape, but Gigante stands in the vehicle's path under the belief that Hit-Girl will never kill a cop. His hunch pays off and Hit-Girl swerves, crashing the vehicle and is arrested. When Marcus tries to come to her aid, he is also arrested by Gigante, when he is baited into revealing that he knew his step-daughter was the infamous Hit-Girl. Hit-Girl is then subsequently led away in handcuffs, though the crowd of survivors cheers her on for her role in stopping the Motherfucker and his group.

=== Book Four ===
Book Four of The Dave Lizewski Years, originally titled Kick-Ass 3, is set during the six months after the events of Book Three: Mindy McCready remains in jail while Dave Lizewski graduates high school and continues his battle against organized crime. However, Justice Forever refuses to help him free Mindy from prison and Lieutenant Stripes is killed by Chris Genovese's mother Angela while trying to avenge his brother, Colonel Stars. Corrupt police officer Vic Gigante, having been promoted to captain after arresting Mindy, contacts the Motherfucker's uncle, Don Rocco "Ice-Man" Genovese. They ultimately arrange for an unnamed mob enforcer to take credit for the neighborhood-wide massacre and gang rape of Kick-Ass's crush Katie Deauxma, clearing Chris' name and allowing Rocco to take over the mob's operations in the city.

After a fight with a gang, Dave meets a woman named Valerie and starts dating her. However, he rarely appears to his hero meetings due to having frequent sex with Valerie at her place. At a party being held to celebrate Chris' release, Kick-Ass arranges to get the members of Justice Forever to help him raid the party and send a warning to the mob. The plan fails when Kick-Ass' friends flee in the face of mob retaliation. Elsewhere, Mindy confides to her psychiatrist that she has circumvented the prison's security so as to allow her to wander around and kill problematic inmates at night. Furthermore, she talks about how her father created his false backstory in order to manipulate her into continuing her career as Hit-Girl. Mindy also meets her mother, who is proud of her actions as Hit-Girl.

Gigante and three disguised cops rob Rocco, intending to make a fortune and leave New York. In response, Rocco orders the killing of everyone found in a mask, resulting in the deaths of four Justice Forever members and the kidnapping of Dave's roommate Todd. In jail, Mindy is drugged by a group of corrupt guards working for Rocco, who plans to have Chris execute Mindy in front of all the other East Coast mob leaders. However, Chris, having a pang of guilt over how his actions have affected his mother, decides to spare Mindy and fight the guards. Chris is mortally wounded and dies, but not before helping Mindy escape. Kick-Ass rescues Mindy from a cop working for Rocco, brutally killing him.

Mindy goes to Rocco's meeting in a speedboat, intending to kill all the gang leaders assembled at a boathouse; Dave goes to save Todd in Big Daddy's monster truck. Dave is briefly overpowered by the thugs holding Todd but ends up electrocuting them all. Meanwhile, an anonymous tipster alerts Gigante that he and Mindy will be at Rocco's meeting. Mindy arrives and slaughters the assembled bosses, but is confronted by Gigante and his corrupt cops. Mindy reveals to the cops that she was the anonymous tipster, before triggering explosives that take out all the corrupt cops except Gigante. She then maims Gigante by destroying his pelvis, then forces him to turn state's evidence.

Sometime later, Dave has abandoned his superhero identity, instead deciding to join the police and remaining with Valerie. Marcus is then cleared of all charges thanks to Gigante's testimony, and has rooted out the remaining corrupt elements from the force. Angela and Mindy's mother have become close friends. Mindy remains an active vigilante, killing criminals across the world, though she never contacts Dave again. She does give flowers to her mother once every year, similar to the flowers her father gave to her. The comic ends with a callback to the first scene of the first comic, where Skybird, an applicant for Justice Forever that was chased away by the Juicer, jumps off a building, using his costume to actually fly away.

In a "post-credits scene", Mindy shows up at the house of a bullied kid, Paul McQue, holding Kick-Ass's uniform, announcing that she is now going to train him to be a superhero.

== Characters ==
=== Dave Lizewski / Kick-Ass ===
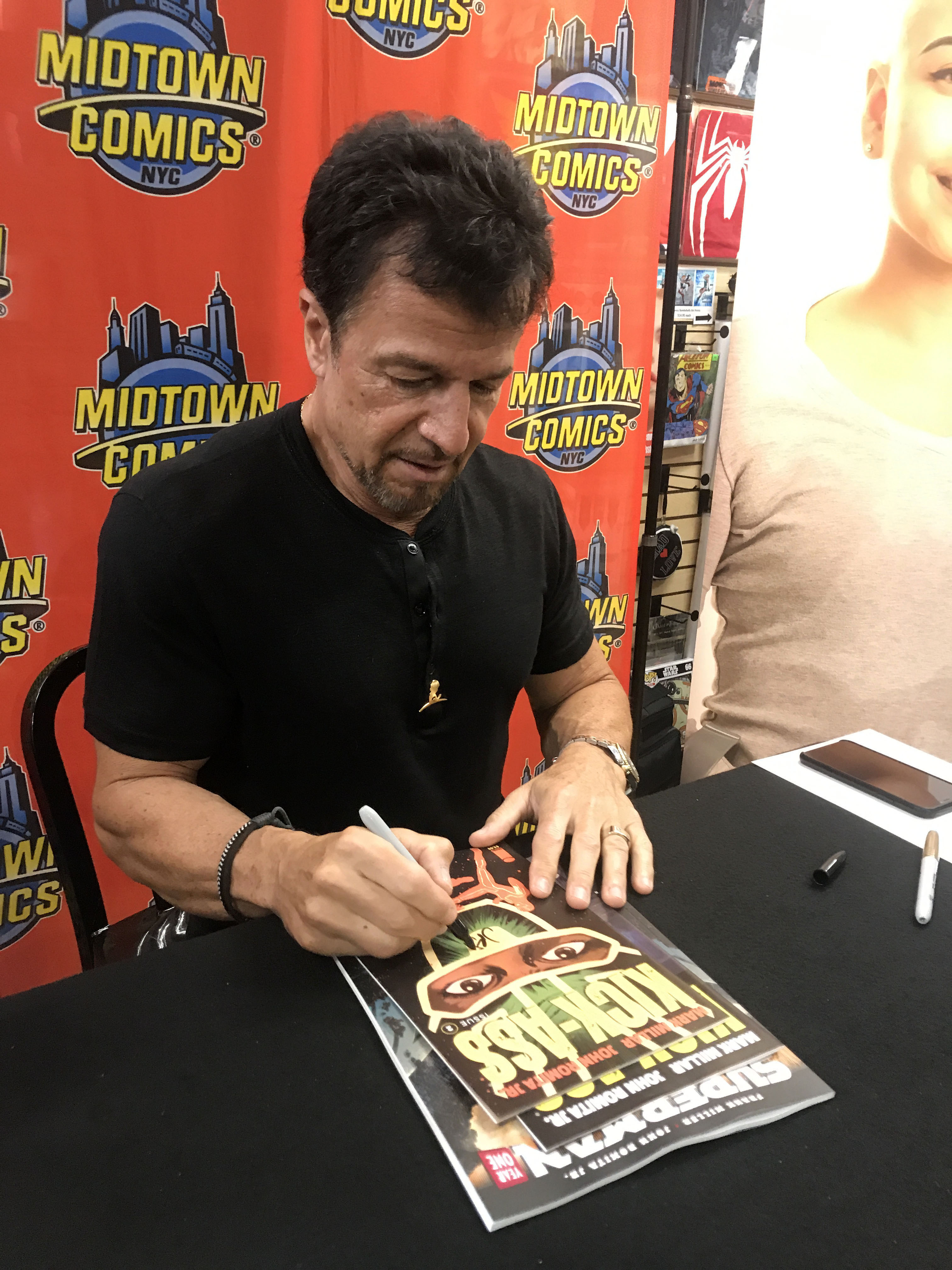
Artist John Romita Jr. signing copies of the book at Midtown Comics in Manhattan

Dave Lizewski is a sixteen-year-old high school student, who decides to become a real-life superhero, despite having little-to-no fighting skills or training, and no super powers, he assumes the superhero role by fashioning a costume from a wetsuit bought on eBay. His initial attempt to stop a group of graffiti artists fails, and he gets beaten and stabbed, and then hit by a car. His injuries are extensive, he suffers severe nerve damage and requires operations to insert metal plates inside his head. This has the side effect of giving him an unusually high tolerance for pain. After recovering he again tries to fight crime. He intervenes to protect a guy from an attack by a group of thugs, only to get beaten up himself in the process. A guy videos his actions and posts it on YouTube. He becomes an overnight celebrity, and is given the moniker Kick-Ass. His actions inspires others to become superheroes. In the live-action film adaptation, he is portrayed by Aaron Johnson.

Millar said, "[Dave] is probably as related to me as George Costanza was to Larry David, which is that all the worst aspects I remember from my memory I have taken and shoved into the story and then exaggerated them." Millar added, "the core is definitely there. Our backgrounds are really similar. The family setup is similar. All that is exactly the same. The only thing I didn't do was make the costume. I planned to. I went to karate and bodybuilding. My friend and I were absolutely going to do it. The one big difference between us is that Dave had the balls to put on the suit, and I didn't."

=== Damon McCready / Big Daddy ===
Big Daddy makes his first appearance in Kick-Ass issue #4. A professional crimefighter, he is adept at firearms, and assumes the supporting role of a sniper in most of the missions that involve himself and his daughter, Hit-Girl, whom he has groomed into a lethal vigilante. In issue # 6, it is revealed that Damon and his daughter have been living on the run for years under many false identities; when he meets Kick-Ass, he says he is an ex-cop who is eager to avenge his wife's murder by the mob, a "secret origin" that Kick-Ass compares to Frank Castle's. In issue # 7, it is revealed that Big Daddy lied about his origin: he was never a cop. His true motivation to train his daughter was so she would be "different" and "special." In the original storyline, he is a comic book fan like Dave.

In the live-action film adaptation, Damon/Big Daddy is played by Nicolas Cage. His name is Damon MacCready, although in the comic, only his surname is mentioned. Cage's portrayal of the character is different from the one in the comic, with a Batman-inspired costume and a completely different backstory. In the film, Big Daddy really is a former cop -- one who was framed on corruption charges by the D'Amico crime family, due to his dogged investigation of the crime syndicate -- While in prison, his wife takes an overdose and dies during childbirth, leading to a fellow officer (Marcus Williams) adopting Mindy and raising her. Upon being released from prison, he reunites with his daughter Mindy, who he begins to train to help him bring down the crime syndicate. This serves as a major plot element to the series, as Big Daddy's main motivation for becoming a super-hero and Red Mist's betrayal of Kick-Ass.

=== Mindy McCready / Hit-Girl ===
Hit-Girl is a deadly martial arts and weapons expert who has been trained to fight crime all her childhood life. She debuts in Kick-Ass Issue # 3. She and her father, Damon McCready / Big Daddy, are constantly on the run. Her main goal is to avenge her mother, although the comic suggests Big Daddy has influenced her way of thinking. In Issue # 6, her age is revealed to be "12 and 1/4".

Unlike Kick-Ass, Hit-Girl is depicted as a very effective superhero. Dave describes her as a mix between John Rambo and Polly Pocket. Artist John Romita Jr. commented about the character: "I think what's so badass is, how can a little girl become such a force? And I likened it to parents that turn their kids into super athletes. Even against their own will. They become unconscious athletes, almost to a fault. They become hardened. It kind of works the same way." In the film adaptation, Mindy is played by Chloë Grace Moretz. Compared to the comic version, Mindy in the film is much older (around 13–14 years old) and her mother really did die (though of suicide rather than murder).

=== Chris Genovese / Red Mist / The Motherfucker ===
The son of corporate (mafia) boss John Genovese / Johnny G, Chris first appears in the background in issue #4 where he reads comic books at one of the stores, and then while his father is talking with his men. Inspired by Kick-Ass, he creates his own superhero character named Red Mist. Like Kick-Ass, he has no inherent fighting abilities; he instead calls the cops and directs them to the location where the crimes are occurring.

After garnering attention from the media and envy from Kick-Ass, Red Mist teams up with him in fighting crime. He even shows him his car called the "Mistmobile". Red Mist betrays Kick-Ass in order to capture Big Daddy and Hit-Girl and to gain favor from his father. He also shows a deep loathing of Kick-Ass and revels in seeing him tortured. He eventually decides to become a supervillain and makes a new costume and alias, doing by The Motherfucker.

In the film adaptation, Chris is played by Christopher Mintz-Plasse. In the comic series, the link between Red Mist and Chris as the Mafia boss' son is not revealed until issue #7, in the film this is revealed from the beginning. He wears a red costume with shades of black, and a red wig. In the first film, he is portrayed as a much more sympathetic and less mysterious character who tries to gain the approval of his father by getting close to Kick-Ass using his own superhero persona. Unlike the comics, he actually likes Kick-Ass and initially balks when his father decides to torture and kill Kick-Ass.

=== John Genovese / Johnny G ===
John Genovese, also known as "Johnny G", is an Italian-American New York crime boss, and one of the main villains in the series. Appears in Kick-Ass #3. Although he finds it difficult to take them seriously, Genovese is bewildered and incensed that his operations are being disturbed by people costumed as superheroes. He finds Kick-Ass merely ridiculous, and identifies Big Daddy and Hit-Girl as the source of his problems.

In the film adaptation, the character is renamed Frank D'Amico, and played by Mark Strong. He is depicted as athletic and adept at martial arts.

=== Katie Deauxma ===
Katie is a 16-year-old high-school classmate of Dave and his long-time crush. She initially does not like him, and believes he is a stalker. After Dave is beaten up and found naked, she believes rumors that he is gay, and wants to take care of him and to make him her "gay best friend". When Dave admits he is not gay, she has her boyfriend beat up Dave, and later sends a picture to Dave's phone of her performing oral sex on her boyfriend. In Kick-Ass 2, her house is ransacked and she is forced to watch her father get shot to death by a team of men in costumes led by Motherfucker. The villains then rape and hospitalize her. It is unknown what happens to her after that as she is never mentioned again.

In the film adaptation, Katie (played by Lyndsy Fonseca) forgives Dave for pretending he was gay, and starts a relationship with him. She breaks up with Dave in the second film and is not assaulted. Chris tries to rape Dave's next girlfriend, a vigilante known as "Night Bitch", but he is unable to get aroused by her. The villains still beat her and she winds up in the hospital.

=== James Lizewski ===
Dave's father. He becomes worried about the behavior of his son, eventually taking the fall for Dave's activities when the authorities round up all costumed superheroes in the aftermath of Chris' rampage. His murder in prison and subsequent grave desecration at Chris' hands motivate Dave to take him down once and for all.

== Development ==
Mark Millar has called the idea behind the series "very autobiographical":

When I was 15, my best friends and I were reading Frank Miller comics, like Batman: Year One. (...) We were so into it, we should have been studying for exams at the time. We wanted to become superheroes like Batman. It was pathetic. We were five years too old really to be doing this. The story was really about what would have happened if we hadn't come to our senses and actually gone out and done this.

Romita said that he decided to add personal touches of his own to the series when he found out that the series had a personal connection to Millar. Romita designed the neighborhood, schoolyard, setting, and clothes in a manner that evoked his neighborhood in Queens, New York City; most of the time the series is set in Romita's neighborhood.

A Hit-Girl limited series was announced at the Kapow Comic Con, to focus on how she deals with ordinary life, such as attending high school; the series was later rebranded as Book Two of The Dave Lizewski Years.

On March 16, 2010, Mark Millar said he would begin writing a sequel comic book in April. Millar revealed when he wrote the first set of comics, he also produced outlines for four books, with the second and third books involving criminals taking on supervillain personae to counter the superheroes, and Hit-Girl trying to lead a normal life. The new series was announced to have the working title of Kick-Ass 2: Balls to the Wall, before being rebranded as Book Three of The Dave Lizewski Years upon the release of Kick-Ass – The New Girl. Red Mist reappears, using The Motherfucker as a new name, and leads a group of supervillains against Kick-Ass and Hit-Girl.

The third volume ran in eight-page installments the UK magazine CLiNT starting in August 2010. The first issue showed Hit-Girl attempting to train Kick-Ass to be a more competent superhero, with both intending to form a team with the other costumed heroes that were emerging. In her civilian life, her stepfather is trying to get her to stop being a superhero.

The first issue of Book Four of The Dave Lizewski Years was released July 2, 2013, with the eighth and final issue of the fourth volume of The Dave Lizewski Years being released on August 6, 2014, concluding the series as a whole.

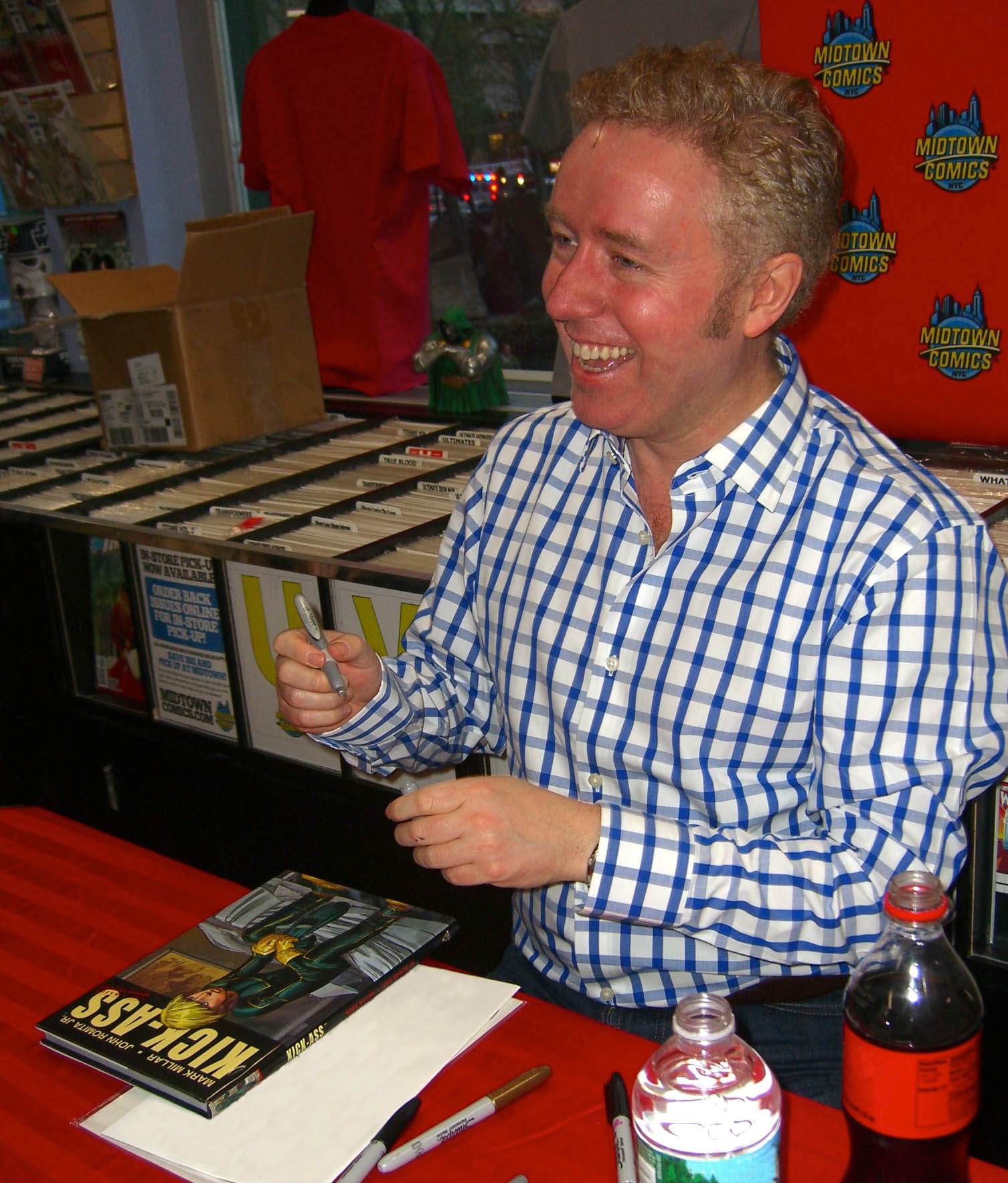
Writer Mark Millar signing a copy of the collected edition during an appearance at Midtown Comics in Manhattan

== Promotion ==
Prior to the debut of the series, a viral campaign featuring a short video of Kick-Ass, the main character of the comic, being "caught on tape" performing a heroic act was uploaded to YouTube and spread around the Internet. Later, a real-life Myspace page was created, supposedly maintained by the character, where it was written that "Mark Millar [...] is doing a comic-book about me with [...] John Romita Jr."

A charity auction was held to name the main character. The winner, Dave Lizewski, chose his own name.

Each issue also singles out specific comic shops, crediting them for taking part in the "home-made effort" to promote the book and encourages readers to support them.

== Film adaptations ==
=== Kick-Ass (2010) ===
Kick-Ass was released in the United Kingdom on 26 March 2010, by Universal Pictures, and in the United States on 16 April, by Lionsgate.

=== Kick-Ass 2 (2013) ===
Kick-Ass 2 was released on 14 August 2013 in the United Kingdom and on 16 August in the United States, by Universal Pictures.

=== Stuntnuts: The Movie ===
Stuntnuts: The Movie will be released.

=== Stuntnuts Does School Fight ===
Stuntnuts Does School Fight will be released.

== Follow-ups ==
On February 14, 2018, a new Kick-Ass series, subtitled The New Girl, went into publication from Image Comics, featuring new supervillain protagonist named Patience Lee, an Afghanistan war veteran and single mother who dons Kick-Ass' costume to clear her family's financial debts by robbing high-profile criminals, before becoming a crime boss herself. On February 21 2018, the first issue of a Hit-Girl series from Image Comics was published, with a successive change of writers and artists for each story arc, named as: Frank Quitely, Eduardo Risso, Rafael Albuquerque, Kevin Smith, Daniel Way and Pete Milligan. The title sees Mindy McCready leaving the United States to carry on her fight for justice on a worldwide scale, depicting events mentioned in the epilogue of Book Four of The Dave Lizewski Years, which serve as a sequel to the main events of the series. From July to November 2023, a Millarworld crossover miniseries, Big Game, was published by Image Comics, following a now mid-20s Mindy as she teams up Kingsman agent Eggsy Unwin against Wesley Gibson, while Dave is granted superpowers by the Magic Order and joins the superhero team The Ambassadors.
