= Kick-Ass 2: The Game =

2014 video game

- Developer: Freedom Factory Studios
- Publisher: UIG Entertainment
- Platforms: Microsoft Windows; PlayStation 3 Xbox 360
- Release: Microsoft Windows: EU: 16 May 2014; NA: 15 August 2014; PlayStation 3: EU: 1 August 2014; AU: 17 September 2014; Xbox 360: EU: 1 August 2014
- Genres: Action, beat 'em up
- Mode: Single-player

Kick-Ass 2: The Game is a beat 'em up video game based on the film Kick-Ass 2. It serves as a sequel to Kick-Ass: The Game. It was developed by Freedom Factory Studios and published by UIG Entertainment. The game was released for Microsoft Windows, PlayStation 3, and Xbox 360.

The game was heavily criticized by critics, for its technical glitches and lack of originality.

== Plot ==
Kick-Ass 2: The Game is set in New York City. The game takes on a similar plot to the movie it was based on. Taking place three to four years after the death of Damon McCready and stopping Frank D'Amico, The main character, Dave Lizewski, also known as Kick-Ass, has retired from superhero and crime-fighting work. However, he quickly becomes bored of having a normal life and begins training with Damon's Daughter, Mindy McCready, also known as Hit Girl. Before Kick Ass can complete his training, however, the son of Frank D'Amico, Chris D'Amico accidentally kills his mother. He blames Kick Ass for this, and vows to get his revenge. He also replaces his superhero name Red Mist and became a super villain named The Motherfucker, and recruit a team named "The Toxic Mega-Cunts", hired some other villains like The Tumor, Genghis Carnage, Black Death and Mother Russia, and plans to take over New York City. Now Kick-Ass needs to help the superhero team "Justice Forever" and must stop Chris and save New York.

== Gameplay ==
At the beginning of the game, the gameplay is mostly training; however, the game later sees the player go on to fighting enemies and bosses similar to those in the movie. There are 5 bosses in total, throughout all of the levels. The game features a wide variety of weapons for the player's use in fighting enemies and bosses. There are also a large number of combos which can be used against enemies in the game. The controls use two different buttons for attacks.
