= Olga Kurkulina =

Israeli actress and athlete

- Ольга Куркулина
- Born: May 18, 1971 (age 55); Soviet Union
- Occupations: athlete, actor
- Spouse: Dmitri Kurkulin
- Children: 2

Olga Kurkulina (Russian: Ольга Куркулина; Hebrew: אולגה קורקולינה; born 1971) is a Soviet-born Israeli high-jumper, bodybuilder and actress.

She made her film debut as the supervillain Mother Russia in the 2013 black comedy superhero film Kick-Ass 2.

== Early life ==
Kurkulina was born and raised in the Soviet Union. Later in her life she immigrated to Israel.

== High jump career ==
Kurkulina was a three-time Israeli Athletic Association winner in the high jump, winning the 2001 and 2002 outdoor titles. In 1997, she set an Israeli national record of 1.91 metres. She qualified for the 'B' finals of the 2004 European Champion Clubs Cup.

== Personal life ==
Kurkulina is married and has two children, daughter Anna and son Danila. They reside in Haifa, Israel.
