= Kick-Ass (film) =

2010 superhero black comedy film

- Theatrical release poster
- Directed by: Matthew Vaughn
- Screenplay by: Jane Goldman; Matthew Vaughn
- Based on: Kick-Ass (Note: Later retitled to Book One of Kick-Ass: The Dave Lizewski Years) by: Mark Millar; John Romita Jr.
- Produced by: Matthew Vaughn; Brad Pitt; Kris Thykier; Adam Bohling; Tarquin Pack; David Reid
- Starring: Aaron Johnson; Christopher Mintz-Plasse; Chloë Grace Moretz; Mark Strong; Nicolas Cage
- Cinematography: Ben Davis
- Edited by: Pietro Scalia; Jon Harris; Eddie Hamilton
- Music by: John Murphy; Henry Jackman; Marius de Vries; Ilan Eshkeri
- Production companies: Marv Films; Plan B Entertainment
- Distributed by: Lionsgate (United States); Focus Features International (uncredited; select territories; through Universal Pictures)
- Release dates: 12 March 2010 (SXSW); 26 March 2010 (United Kingdom); 16 April 2010 (United States)
- Running time: 118 minutes
- Countries: United Kingdom; United States
- Language: English
- Budget: $28–30 million
- Box office: $96.2 million

Kick-Ass is a 2010 superhero black comedy film directed by Matthew Vaughn from a screenplay by Jane Goldman and Vaughn. It is based on the comic book of the same name by Mark Millar and John Romita Jr., and is the first film in the Kick-Ass franchise.

It tells the story of an ordinary teenager, Dave Lizewski (Aaron Johnson), who sets out to become a real-life superhero, calling himself "Kick-Ass". Dave gets caught up in a bigger fight when he meets Big Daddy (Nicolas Cage), a former cop who, in his quest to bring down the crime boss Frank D'Amico (Mark Strong), has trained his eleven-year-old daughter (Chloë Grace Moretz) to be the ruthless vigilante Hit-Girl.

The film was released in the United Kingdom on 26 March 2010, by Universal Pictures, and in the United States on 16 April, by Lionsgate. Despite having generated some controversy for its profanity and strong violence performed by a child, Kick-Ass was well received by both critics and audiences. In 2011 it won the Empire Award for Best British Film. The film has gained a large cult following since its release on DVD and Blu-ray.

A sequel, written and directed by Jeff Wadlow and produced by Vaughn, was released in August 2013, with Johnson, Mintz-Plasse, and Moretz reprising their roles. In January 2024, Vaughn announced that a third film, titled Stuntnuts Does School Fight and directed by Damien Walters, had secretly been greenlit, cast, and had completed filming.

== Plot ==
Dave Lizewski is an awkward teenager who lives in Staten Island with his widowed father. Inspired by comic books and wondering why there are no real-life superheroes, Dave modifies a wetsuit to become a superhero but is attacked and critically injured while confronting muggers. Having some bones replaced with metal, Dave gains an enhanced pain tolerance. A rumor spreads in school that Dave is gay; following this, he and his crush, Katie Deauxma, develop a close platonic friendship after she approaches him based on the rumor.

Dave gains notoriety after rescuing a man from a gang attack. Calling himself "Kick-Ass", he starts a Myspace account and is contacted by Katie, who is being harassed by a drug dealer. Kick-Ass is outnumbered by the dealer and his henchmen but is saved by two costumed vigilantes, Big Daddy and his daughter Hit-Girl.

Big Daddy is really Damon Macready, a former police officer who was framed by Mafia boss Frank D'Amico and imprisoned. His wife committed suicide, leaving behind their daughter, Mindy. Upon his release, Damon trained himself and Mindy to get revenge on D'Amico by sabotaging his drug operations and stealing his money.

D'Amico targets Kick-Ass, who has been framed for killing his men. His son, Chris, convinces him that he can lure Kick-Ass into a trap by posing as a vigilante called "Red Mist". After meeting Kick-Ass, the plan goes awry when Red Mist finds his father's warehouse in flames and his men killed. A hidden camera reveals Big Daddy caused the carnage.

Dave reveals to Katie that he is Kick-Ass and that he is not gay, confesses his attraction to her, and pledges to give up crime-fighting. However, he is coaxed into another meeting with Red Mist, who tricks him into revealing Big Daddy and Hit-Girl's location. Hit-Girl is seemingly shot dead while Kick-Ass and Big Daddy are captured by D'Amico's men, then tortured and beaten on a live internet broadcast. Hit-Girl (who wore a bulletproof vest) raids the hideout and kills all of D'Amico's men but is too late to save Big Daddy, who was set on fire and dies from his burns.

Kick-Ass and Hit-Girl resolve to take down D'Amico for good. They violently infiltrate D'Amico's penthouse, culminating in Hit-Girl dueling D'Amico and Kick-Ass fighting Red Mist. D'Amico overpowers Hit-Girl and prepares to execute her, but Kick-Ass manages to subdue Red Mist and kill D'Amico by blasting him out of a window with a bazooka. Following their victory, Dave and Mindy unmask themselves and properly greet each other.

Dave and Mindy retire from crime-fighting; Dave pursues a relationship with Katie; and Mindy, under the guardianship of Damon's former partner, Marcus Williams, is enrolled at Dave's school. Meanwhile, Red Mist dons a new suit and plans revenge against Kick-Ass.

== Cast ==
- Aaron Johnson as Dave Lizewski / Kick-Ass, a high school geek who seeks to be a superhero
- Christopher Mintz-Plasse as Chris D'Amico / Red Mist, son of crime boss Frank D'Amico
- Chloë Grace Moretz as Mindy Macready / Hit-Girl, daughter of Big Daddy, raised as a vigilante since age 5
- Mark Strong as Frank D'Amico, a New York mafioso with the city in his grip
- Nicolas Cage as Damon Macready / Big Daddy, an ex-cop turned vigilante seeking payback against Frank D'Amico for destroying his family
- Lyndsy Fonseca as Katie Deauxma, Dave Lizewski's girlfriend
- Clark Duke as Marty Eisenberg, Dave Lizewski's friend
- Evan Peters as Todd Haynes, Dave Lizewski's friend
- Sophie Wu as Erika Cho, Katie's friend
- Omari Hardwick as Sergeant Marcus Williams, Macready's former partner
- Stu Riley as Huge Goon
- Michael Rispoli as Big Joe, Frank D'Amico's enforcer
- Dexter Fletcher as Cody
- Jason Flemyng as Lobby Goon
- Xander Berkeley as Detective Gigante, NYPD Sergeant on D'Amico's payroll
- Kofi Natei as Rasul, a drug dealer who was causing problems for Katie
- Corey Johnson as Sporty Goon
- Adrian Martinez as Ginger Goon
- Katrena Rochell as Female Junkie
- Randall Batinkoff as Tre Fernandez
- Tim Plester as Danil
- Omar Soriano as Leroy
- Garrett M. Brown as Mr. Lizewski, Dave's father
- Elizabeth McGovern as Mrs. Lizewski, Dave's deceased mother
- Yancy Butler as Angie D'Amico, Frank D'Amico's wife
- Deborah Twiss as Mrs. Zane, Dave's teacher
- Craig Ferguson as himself

Series-creator Millar, a native of Scotland, asked Scottish television children's-show host Glen Michael to make a cameo appearance although his role was cut from the film. Millar was also set to make a cameo as a Scottish alcoholic but the scene was cut from the film. WCBS-TV news reporters Maurice DuBois, Dana Tyler, and Lou Young make cameo appearances. Marvel Comics creator Stan Lee filmed a cameo that was ultimately cut.

An image of Matthew Vaughn's wife, model Claudia Schiffer, appears prominently on a billboard poster. John Romita Jr. appears without his face being shown: "I was a barista. ... [T]hey asked me to look at the camera, then turn and turn the television on with a remote control. And then they edited out my face! I laughed and laughed – I was the only authentic New Yorker in the scene and they edited out my face for not looking authentic enough! Then the producer, Tarquin Pack ... changed my first name to Tony: Tony Romita. 'Why'd you do that?' I asked. 'Well, "Johnny Romita" wasn't tough enough.'"

== Production ==
=== Development ===
The rights to a film version of the first volume of the comic book series were sold before the first issue was published. Developed in parallel, the film writers took a different story direction, to reach many of the same conclusions. Comic book writer Mark Millar acknowledges the differences, explaining that a comic usually has eight acts, while a film usually has a three-act structure. Millar initially considered having American Jesus adapted and communicated to Matthew Vaughn about that concept, but Vaughn switched to Kick Ass after Millar mentioned it and sent some materials to Vaughn.

Vaughn said that, "We wrote the script and the comic at the same time so it was a very sort of collaborative, organic process. I met [Millar] at the premiere of Stardust. We got on really well. I knew who he was and what he had done but I didn't know him. He pitched me the idea. I said, 'That's great!' He then wrote a synopsis. I went, 'That's great, let's go do it now! You write the comic, I'll write the script.'" Jane Goldman, one of the screenwriters, said that when she works with Vaughn she does the "construction work" and the "interior designing" while Vaughn acts as the "architect".

With Kick-Ass, the book's just out and now the movie's out six weeks later. And I think that's the way things are going to go now, because to go to Marvel's B and C-list characters and try to get movies out [of] them; what's the point of that?

— Mark Millar

Millar said that screenwriters Goldman and Vaughn had made a "chick flick", having placed more emphasis on the character emotions and particularly in having softened the character of Katie Deauxma. Millar stated that a film audience would have difficulty accepting Dave and Katie not being together, while a comic audience would more easily accept that idea. Frank Lovece of Film Journal International said that Katie is "much less Mean Girls" in the film than in the comic and that the romance between Dave and Katie "proves a needed counterbalance to the otherwise pervasive sense of optimism being stripped away layer by layer, down below angry cynicism and headed straight down the hole to nihilism". Kenneth Turan of the Los Angeles Times said "the romance provides an appealing backdrop that the more unnerving aspects of the film play out against". Other changes included having Red Mist be known to be a secret antagonist from the start, as well as making him less outright villainous, and D'Amico's mob initially thinking Kick-Ass is the one slaughtering their men.

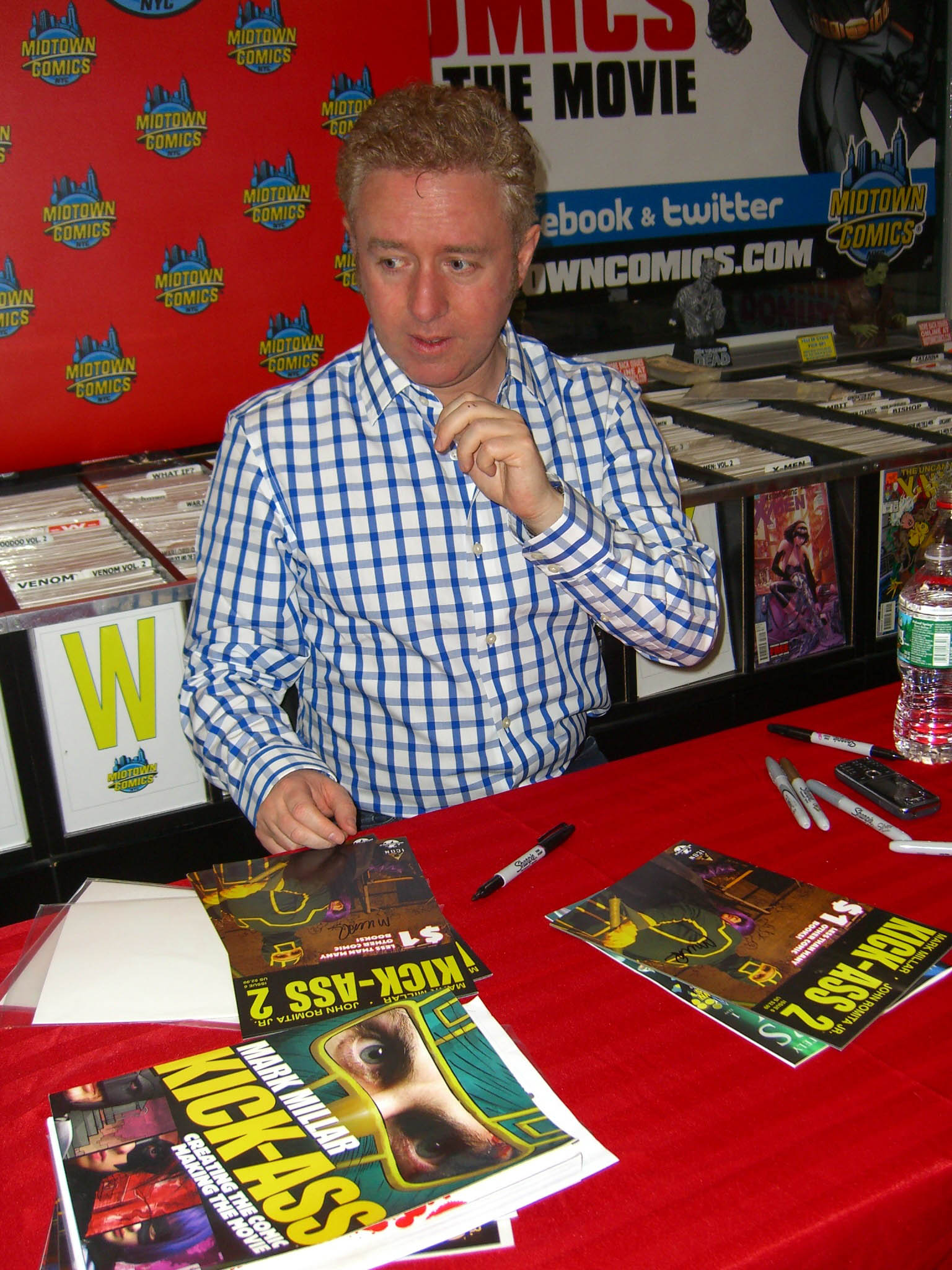
Creator Mark Millar signing posters for the movie and copies of the comics sequel, Kick-Ass 2, during an appearance at Midtown Comics in Manhattan.

In the original comic-book, Big Daddy is characterised not as an ex-cop, but as a former accountant who had been motivated to fight crime by a desire to escape from his life and by his love of comic books. In the film, his purported origin and motivations are genuine: writer Mark Millar stated that the revelation about Big Daddy's background would not have worked in the film adaptation and "would have ruined the movie".

The comic's artist, John Romita, Jr., stated that Big Daddy's story in the film "works better stopping short ... You love him better in the film".

The climax to the film differs significantly from the comics, with the use of the jetpack and rocket launcher: Millar called this "necessary" as "we're building up so much stuff that we needed some Luke Skywalker blowing up the Death Star moment". Comic writer Stephen Grant argued that the film "cheated" on its premise of a "real life" superhero by having these increasingly fantastic events and that this is "why it works. That's where much of the humor comes from ... when the film finally makes the notion [the fantasy] explicit we're already so deep into the magician's act that our instinct is to play along".

Vaughn initially went to Sony, which distributed Layer Cake, but he rejected calls to tone down the violence. Other studios expressed interest but wanted to make the characters older. In particular, studios wanted to change Hit-Girl's character into an adult. Goldman said that while studio executives said that it would be less offensive to portray Hit-Girl as a teenager, Goldman argued that it would have been more offensive since, as a teenager, Hit-Girl would have been sexualized. Goldman said that Hit-Girl was not supposed to be sexualized.

Vaughn had a little trouble adapting to film, as the film had no studio. The big studios doubted the success of an adaptation as a violent superhero, which made the film be independently financed, but this gave him the freedom to make the film the way he imagined, without having to worry about high censorship. Vaughn believed enough in the project to raise the money himself. Christopher Mintz-Plasse said that the creators of the film were wondering whether a distributor would pick up the movie. On the set, Vaughn jokingly referred to Kick-Ass as something that was going to be "the most expensive home movie I ever made". On 18 August 2009, it was announced that the film had been acquired for distribution in the United States and Canada by Lionsgate.

The 2D/3D animated comic book sequence in the film took almost two years to finish. Romita created the pencils, Tom Palmer did the inks, and Dean White did the colours. Vaughn gave Romita a carte blanche on the art direction of the sequence.

=== Filming ===
Principal photography began in September 2008.

Filming locations included Hamilton, Ontario, Canada; Dip 'N' Sip Donuts on Kingston Road in Toronto, Sir Winston Churchill Secondary School, and "many Toronto landmarks that play cameos"; and various locations in the United Kingdom, including Elstree Studios. The opening sequence with Nicolas Cage was filmed in a sewage plant in east London.

The Atomic Comics store in the film is based on the now-defunct real-life Arizona-based chain whose owner, Millar said, is a friend of artist John Romita Jr. Millar asked Mike Malve for permission to use Atomic Comics in the film, and a model version of Atomic Comics was created at the London pilot studio for use in the filming.

== Reaction ==
In January 2010, an uncensored preview clip of the film was attacked by family advocacy groups for its display of violence and use of the line "Okay, you cunts, let's see what you can do now", delivered by Chloë Grace Moretz, who was 12 years old at the time of filming. Australian Family Association spokesman John Morrissey said that "the language [was] offensive and the values inappropriate; without the saving grace of the bloodless victory of traditional superheroes".

Moretz stated in an interview, "If I ever uttered one word that I said in Kick-Ass, I would be grounded for years! I'd be stuck in my room until I was 20! I would never in a million years say that. I'm an average, everyday girl." Moretz has said that while filming, she could not bring herself to say the film's title out loud in interviews, instead calling it "the film" in public and "Kick-Butt" at home.

Christopher Mintz-Plasse notes a hypocrisy that people were angry about the language but did not seem to be offended that Hit-Girl kills numerous people.

=== Ratings ===
In an interview with Total Film, Aaron Johnson confirmed that the film stays true to the adult nature of the comic series by featuring a large amount of profanity and graphic violence. The film received an R rating by the MPAA for "strong brutal violence throughout, pervasive language, sexual content, nudity and some drug use—some involving children", and it received a 15 rating from the BBFC. Director Matthew Vaughn felt the 15 certificate was about right and expressed some surprise at the film having received a "PG rating [sic]" in France.

== Reception ==
=== Box office ===
The film earned over $12 million internationally in advance of opening in the United States. On its debut weekend in the United States it took in $19.8 million in 3,065 theaters, averaging $6,469 per theater. Kick-Ass was reported number one, ahead of How to Train Your Dragon by $200,000, which was in its third week of release. On Saturday, 17 April 2010, it fell down to number three behind How To Train Your Dragon and Date Night. On Sunday, 2 May 2010, it fell down behind A Nightmare on Elm Street, How To Train Your Dragon, Furry Vengeance, The Back-Up Plan, Date Night, Clash of the Titans and The Losers. These numbers for Kick-Ass's debut weekend gross included non-weekend earnings, as the film was previewed during the Thursday night prior to its release. The film's final gross in the U.S. was $48,071,303 and $48,117,600 outside of the U.S. with a worldwide gross of $96,188,903.

The film was listed among the most infringed films of 2010; according to statistics on TorrentFreak, the film was illegally downloaded over 11.4 million times, second only to Avatar.

=== Critical response ===
On review aggregator Rotten Tomatoes the film holds an approval rating of 78% based on 264 reviews and an average rating of 7.1/10. The site's critics consensus reads: "Not for the faint of heart, Kick-Ass takes the comic adaptation genre to new levels of visual style, bloody violence, and gleeful profanity." Metacritic assigned the film a weighted average score of 66 out of 100, based on 38 mainstream critics, indicating "generally favorable" reviews. American audiences polled by CinemaScore gave the film an average grade of "B" on an A+ to F scale.

In the United Kingdom, The Guardian gave the film extensive coverage by several of its critics and journalists. Peter Bradshaw gave the film 5/5 stars and called it an "explosion in a bad taste factory" and a "thoroughly outrageous, jaw-droppingly violent and very funny riff on the quasi-porn world of comic books; except that there is absolutely no 'quasi' about it". Philip French, writing for The Observer, called the film "relentlessly violent" with "the foulest-mouthed child ever to appear on screen, [who makes] Louis Malle's Zazie sound like Cosette" and one "extremely knowing in its appeal to connoisseurs of comic strips and video games". David Cox wrote an article published in The Guardian, saying that the film "kicks the c-word into the mainstream [...] has inadvertently dispatched our last big expletive".

Chris Hewitt of Empire magazine gave the film 5/5 and declared it, "A ridiculously entertaining, perfectly paced, ultra-violent cinematic rush that kicks the places other movies struggle to reach. ... the film's violence is clearly fantastical and cartoonish and not to be taken seriously."

Critics who enjoyed the film generally singled out its audacity, humour, and performances of the cast. Peter Howell of the Toronto Star gave Kick-Ass a top rating, writing that the production "succeeds as a violent fantasy about our perilous and fretful times, where regular citizens feel compelled to take action against a social order rotting from within". USA Today critic Claudia Puig praised Moretz as "terrific ... Even as she wields outlandish weaponry, she comes off as adorable". Manohla Dargis from The New York Times wrote, "Fast, periodically spit-funny and often grotesquely violent, the film at once embraces and satirizes contemporary action-film clichés with Tarantino-esque self-regard." Owen Gleiberman of Entertainment Weekly gave the film a B+, but noted that "personally, I just wish that the film had ended up a bit less of an over-the-top action ride".

Other reviews were more negative. Roger Ebert found the film highly offensive and "morally reprehensible", giving it one out of four stars. He cited the coarse language and violence, particularly the scene in which Hit-Girl is nearly killed by D'Amico. "When kids in the age range of this movie's home video audience are shooting one another every day in America, that kind of stops being funny." Ebert's only notes of praise were for the performances of Cage, Johnson and Moretz. The movie made that week's "Your Movie Sucks" list of one-star movies.

Tim Robey of The Daily Telegraph did not like the film either, rating it 1/5 and stating, "Matthew Vaughn's Kick Ass is hollow, glazed, and not quite there".

Karina Longworth writing for The Village Voice, was not impressed with the film's intended satire and themes: "Never as shocking as it thinks it is, as funny as it should be, or as engaged in cultural critique as it could be, Kick-Ass is half-assed."

=== Accolades ===
Award	Date of ceremony	Category	Recipient(s)	Result	Ref.
The Comedy Awards	March 26, 2011	Comedy Film	Kick-Ass	Nominated	
The Comedy Awards	March 26, 2011	Comedy Actress – Film	Chloë Grace Moretz	Nominated	
The Comedy Awards	March 26, 2011	Comedy Screenplay	Kick-Ass	Nominated	
The Comedy Awards	March 26, 2011	Comedy Director – Film	Matthew Vaughn	Nominated	
Critics' Choice Movie Awards	January 14, 2011	Best Action Movie	Kick-Ass	Nominated	
Critics' Choice Movie Awards	January 14, 2011	Best Young Performer	Chloë Grace Moretz	Nominated	
Empire Awards	March 27, 2011	Best Film	Kick-Ass	Nominated	
Empire Awards	March 27, 2011	Best Actor	Aaron Johnson	Nominated	
Empire Awards	March 27, 2011	Best Director	Matthew Vaughn	Nominated	
Empire Awards	March 27, 2011	Best British Film	Kick-Ass	Won	
Empire Awards	March 27, 2011	Best Sci-Fi/Fantasy	Kick-Ass	Nominated	
Empire Awards	March 27, 2011	Best Newcomer	Chloë Grace Moretz (also for Let Me In)	Won	
MTV Movie Awards	June 5, 2011	Best Breakout Star	Chloë Grace Moretz	Won	
MTV Movie Awards	June 5, 2011	Biggest Badass Star	Chloë Grace Moretz	Won	
MTV Movie Awards	June 5, 2011	Best Fight	Chloë Grace Moretz vs. Mark Strong	Nominated	
People's Choice Award	January 5, 2011	Favorite Action Movie	Kick-Ass	Nominated	
Saturn Awards	June 23, 2011	Best Horror Film	Kick-Ass	Nominated	
Teen Choice Awards	August 8, 2010	Choice Movie Actor: Action	Nicolas Cage	Nominated	
Teen Choice Awards	August 8, 2010	Choice Movie: Villain	Christopher Mintz-Plasse	Nominated	
Teen Choice Awards	August 8, 2010	Choice Movie: Action	Kick-Ass	Nominated	
Teen Choice Awards	August 8, 2010	Choice Movie: Female Breakout Star	Chloë Grace Moretz	Nominated	
Teen Choice Awards	August 8, 2010	Choice Movie: Male Breakout Star	Aaron Johnson	Nominated	

== Release ==
=== Home media ===
In an interview, Matthew Vaughn said, "There is about 18 minutes of [deleted] footage, which is really good stuff. If the film is a hit, I'll do an extended cut." The film was released on DVD and Blu-ray on 3 August 2010 in North America. This version does not contain the aforementioned deleted content. Selling 1.4 million units within its first week, one-third of these in Blu-ray format, Kick-Ass debuted at number one on the DVD sales chart. The discs were released in the United Kingdom on 6 September 2010.

After its release on home video, it developed a cult following.

== Video game ==
A video game based on the film was developed by Frozen Codebase. It was released through the App Store on 15 April 2010 for the iPhone and iPod Touch. The initial Apple platform release was reportedly an unfinished beta version and was withdrawn from circulation pending a relaunch of a finished version. The game was released on the PlayStation Network on 29 April 2010. Kick-Ass, Hit-Girl and Big Daddy are playable characters. The game features Facebook missions and integration. Both versions of the game received negative reviews.

== Sequels ==
=== Kick-Ass 2 ===
Despite various setbacks and uncertainty as to whether the sequel would ever materialize, on 8 May 2012, it was reported that a sequel would be distributed by Universal Studios, and that Matthew Vaughn had chosen Jeff Wadlow, who also wrote the script, to direct the sequel. Aaron Johnson and Chloë Grace Moretz reprise their roles as Kick-Ass and Hit-Girl, respectively, and Christopher Mintz-Plasse returns as the main villain, going by the name of "the Motherfucker". The film, titled Kick-Ass 2, was released on 14 August 2013 in the United Kingdom and on 16 August 2013 in the United States.

=== Stuntnuts Does School Fight ===
In January 2024, Matthew Vaughn announced that a third Kick-Ass film, titled Stuntnuts Does School Fight and directed by Damien Walters, had secretly been greenlit, cast, and had completed filming, set to release later that year.

== See also ==
- Vigilante film
