= Kick-Ass – The New Girl =

Comic book limited series

- Cover of Book Four; art by Marcelo Frusin.

Publication information
- Publisher: Image Comics
- Format: Limited series
- Publication date: February 2018 – May 2021
- No. of issues: 23
- Main character(s): Patience Lee / Kick-Ass; Mindy McCready / Hit-Girl

Creative team
- Written by: Mark Millar (vol. 1); Steve Niles (vol. 2–4)
- Artist(s): John Romita Jr. (vol. 1); Marcelo Frusin (vol. 2–4)

Collected editions
- The New Girl: ISBN 978-153431-1688

Kick-Ass – The New Girl, titled Kick-Ass vs. Hit-Girl for its fourth and final volume, is an American superhero crime comic book limited series written by Mark Millar and Steve Niles, and illustrated by John Romita Jr. and Marcelo Frusin. Published by Image Comics, the series is a stand-alone sequel/spin-off to the Icon Comics series Kick-Ass – The Dave Lizewski Years by Millar and Romita Jr., and the second series in the franchise, set in the Millarworld. The first three volumes follow villain protagonist and former soldier Patience Lee as she takes up the Kick-Ass mantle to become "boss of all bosses" of Albuquerque, New Mexico, while the fourth volume follows Mindy McCready / Hit-Girl as she travels to Albuquerque to kill Patience. The series, published from February 14, 2018 to March 17, 2021, was followed by Big Game, written by Millar and illustrated by Pepe Larraz.

The series received a positive critical reception.

== Premise ==
When black ops soldier Patience Lee travels to Albuquerque from Afghanistan to find her family broke, she resorts to stealing from the local crime bosses; in a twist ending to the first volume, Patience kills the crime bosses and takes their place, taking on the Kick-Ass mantle as a supervillain after being mistaken for the superhero herself (whom she had never heard of, due to being in-combat overseas during the events of The Dave Lizewski Years). Over the next three volumes, Patience sees her position challenged by rival syndicates, the Mexican cartel, the Russian mafia, her own brother-in-law, and finally Mindy McCready / Hit-Girl, the latter coming to Albuquerque to kill Patience on learning what she has been doing.

== Characters ==
- Patience Lee / Kick-Ass – A 40-year-old soldier who is mistaken for a superhero whilst robbing a crime boss, before becoming a crime boss herself.
- Mindy McCready / Hit-Girl – A 12-year-old "lonely" assassin, who seeks to kill Patience for using her former partners' name.
- Maurice – Patience's brother-in-law, a career criminal whose connections Patience uses to enter the crime world of Albuquerque.
- Violencia – An insane hitman with full-body burns, who joins Santos after Patience kills his boss.
- Hector Santos – The head a rival syndicate, who comes to blows with Patience.
- Wallace – Santos' sociopathic representative, who likes wearing sunglasses.
- Coop – A war veteran and former comrade-in-arms of Patience.

== Reception ==
Volume #	Publication date	Critic rating	Critic reviews	Ref.
1	September 2018	7.3/10	119	
2	April 2019	8.3/10	51	
3	December 2019	8.3/10	32	
4	May 2021	7.8/10	36	
Overall		8.0/10	238	
