= Kick-Ass: The Game =

2010 video game

- Developer: Frozen Codebase
- Publishers: Frozen Codebase (iOS); WHA Entertainment (PS3)
- Platforms: iOS, PlayStation 3
- Release: iOS; April 17, 2010; PlayStation 3: NA: April 29, 2010; EU: May 5, 2010
- Genre: Beat 'em up
- Modes: Single-player, multiplayer

Kick-Ass: The Game is a beat 'em up video game developed and published by Frozen Codebase (published by WHA Entertainment for the PS3 version) for iOS and PlayStation 3. It is based on the 2010 film and the comic book Kick-Ass, and later spawned a sequel, Kick-Ass 2: The Game.

== Gameplay ==
Kick-Ass kicks an enemy in the groin.

The gameplay of Kick-Ass is an arena-style beat 'em up. Players can choose to play 1 of 3 characters (Kick-Ass, Hit-Girl or Big Daddy) in either single player or co-op mode. Weapon upgrades as well as environment finishers are always available in the game. The game utilizes both joysticks on the PlayStation 3 and is a twin-stick shooter for the iPhone.

== Plot ==
Unlike the comic book and movie, the video game story line introduces all three characters from the start. When Kick-Ass first tries to be a superhero, the thugs beat him. Hit Girl and Big Daddy appear and attack the thugs. The game begins after Kick-Ass is freed from the thugs. The circumstances of the storyline differ depending on which character the player selects. For instance in the film Frank D'Amico's men kidnap Kick-Ass and Big Daddy. In the game's storyline, this would not be possible if the player selects Big Daddy as their character, so in that event the game would instead have Hit Girl be kidnapped.

== Development ==
Ben Geisler, the executive producer of Frozen Codebase, said in a GameSpot interview that they decided to create a fictional social networking website called "Facespace" instead of using the real Myspace that is used in the Kick-Ass film because of "licensing issues".

== Release ==
The iOS version of the game was released on April 17, 2010, but had since been pulled from the Apple App Market. The PlayStation 3 version of the game was released on April 29, 2010, in North America and May 5, 2010, in Europe.

== Reception ==
Reception

Aggregate score
| Aggregator | Score | |
| Aggregator | iOS | PS3 |
|---|---|---|
| Metacritic | 24/100 | 33/100 |

Review scores
| Publication | Score | |
| Publication | iOS | PS3 |
|---|---|---|
| Destructoid | N/A | 3/10 |
| GameSpot | N/A | 4/10 |
| GameZone | N/A | 3.5/10 |
| IGN | 2/10 | 4/10 |
| Play | N/A | 60% |
| Pocket Gamer | 0.5/5 | N/A |
| Teletext GameCentral | N/A | 2/10 |

Kick-Ass: The Game received "generally unfavorable" reviews on both platforms according to the review aggregation website Metacritic.

== Sequel ==
On August 14, 2014, Freedom Factory Studios released a beat 'em up sequel, Kick-Ass 2: The Game, based on the movie Kick-Ass 2.
