= Kick-Ass 2 (film) =

2013 film by Jeff Wadlow

- Theatrical release poster
- Directed by: Jeff Wadlow
- Screenplay by: Jeff Wadlow
- Based on: Hit Girl and Kick-Ass 2: Balls to the Wall (Note: Original titles, later published as Book Two and Book Three of Kick-Ass – The Dave Lizewski Years.) by: Mark Millar; John Romita Jr.
- Produced by: Matthew Vaughn; Adam Bohling; Tarquin Pack; David Reid
- Starring: Aaron Taylor-Johnson; Christopher Mintz-Plasse; Chloë Grace Moretz; Jim Carrey
- Cinematography: Tim Maurice Jones
- Edited by: Eddie Hamilton
- Music by: Henry Jackman; Matthew Margeson
- Production companies: Marv Films; Plan B Entertainment
- Distributed by: Universal Pictures (Worldwide); Toho-Towa (Japan)
- Release dates: 14 August 2013 (United Kingdom); 16 August 2013 (United States); 24 February 2014 (Japan)
- Running time: 103 minutes
- Countries: United Kingdom; United States; Japan
- Language: English
- Budget: $28 million
- Box office: $60.8 million

Kick-Ass 2 is a 2013 black comedy superhero film written and directed by Jeff Wadlow, based on the graphic novels Book Two and Book Three of Kick-Ass – The Dave Lizewski Years (Note: Originally published as Hit-Girl, and Kick-Ass 2: Balls to the Wall, respectively) by Mark Millar and John Romita, Jr., and serving as a sequel to 2010's Kick-Ass. It is the second film in the Kick-Ass franchise, and stars Aaron Taylor-Johnson, Christopher Mintz-Plasse, Chloë Grace Moretz, and Jim Carrey, with the former trio reprising their roles from the first film. The film follows Dave Lizewski / Kick-Ass (Taylor-Johnson), who joins a vigilante team called "Justice Forever", while Mindy Macready / Hit Girl (Moretz) attempts to live a normal life, and Chris D'Amico (Mintz-Plasse) taking up the mantle of The Motherfucker and forming a supervillain team to take revenge on Kick-Ass.

Kick-Ass 2 was released on 14 August 2013 in the United Kingdom, 16 August in the United States, and 24 February 2014 in Japan by Universal Pictures for the former two, and Toho-Towa for the latter. Despite receiving mixed to negative reviews from critics, the film earned $60.8 million on a $30 million budget. In January 2024, Matthew Vaughn revealed that a third Kick-Ass film, titled Stuntnuts: The Movie, directed by Damien Walters, had secretly been greenlit, cast, and had completed filming, set to release later that year.

== Plot ==
Four years after the deaths of Damon Macready and Frank D'Amico, (Note: As depicted in the film Kick-Ass) Dave Lizewski, bored after having retired from fighting crime as Kick-Ass, begins training with Mindy Macready to become a real hero. Dave's girlfriend Katie Deauxma breaks off their relationship due to her mistakenly believing Dave to have been cheating on her with Mindy.

Following the death of his father, Chris D'Amico accidentally kills his own mother by kicking her tanning bed, causing it to short-circuit. Now in control of his father's criminal empire, Chris decides to become a supervillain named "The Motherfucker", adapting a BDSM suit for his costume, and assembles a gang of supervillains called the Toxic Mega Cunts with his aide Javier, swearing vengeance on Kick-Ass. The other leading members of the Toxic Mega Cunts include African-American UFC fighter Black Death, short-stature mob enforcer The Tumor, ex-Triad gang member Genghis Carnage, and the only woman on the team, former Russian bodyguard Mother Russia.

Mindy's guardian, Marcus, discovers she is still fighting crime and makes her promise to give it up. Dave resumes his life as Kick-Ass, joining the superhero team Justice Forever (which he had inspired), led by ex-Mafia member and born-again Christian, Colonel Stars and Stripes. Kick-Ass begins a sexual relationship with Night Bitch, a member of Justice Forever. Dave and Marty (who is also a member of Justice Forever as Battle Guy), alienate their friend Todd from participating in their heroics because his superhero persona "Ass-Kicker" is an obvious knockoff of Kick-Ass. Mindy, attempting to lead a normal life, tries out for the dance team at school, and promptly asks a boy to take her on a date after declining to join Justice Forever. The date ends up as a cruel prank planned by bullies in her school, but Mindy gets her revenge the next day, resulting in her suspension from school and her grounding by Marcus when he finds out.

Dave's father discovers his son is Kick-Ass after finding his superhero costume, and they have an argument which leads Dave to leave home. After his imprisoned uncle has Javier killed, a now-deranged Chris kills Colonel Stars and Stripes, and attempts to rape Night Bitch the following day, but fails due to impotence and has her beaten up instead. Mother Russia kills the arriving authorities, resulting in a police clampdown on both costumed villains and vigilantes. When the police track Dave through his IP address, Dave's father surrenders, claiming that he is Kick-Ass, in Dave's place. Chris, tipped off by Todd, who has joined the Toxic Mega Cunts unaware that they are psychopaths, has Mr. Lizewski murdered in police custody, revealing his true identity.

The Toxic Mega Cunts ambush Mr. Lizewski's funeral and kidnap Dave, but Mindy rescues him. Afterwards, Dave, Mindy and the remaining members of Justice Forever, joined by a resurgence of masked do-gooders, battle and defeat the outnumbered Toxic Mega Cunts. Mindy, as Hit-Girl, defeats and kills Mother Russia with the help of an adrenaline dose in battle, while Dave and Chris fight on a rooftop. Chris crashes through a skylight, landing in a water pool where he is mauled by a shark.

Justice Forever decides to take a break from its superhero duties, helping people in their ordinary lives instead. Mindy tells Dave that she is leaving New York due to being wanted for murder, but that the citizens need Kick-Ass, then kisses him goodbye. As police officers raid Marcus's home to investigate Mindy's whereabouts, Dave accepts the responsibility and begins training and upgrading his equipment, with a much more muscular physique.

In a post-credits scene, Chris, who has survived the shark attack, and whose limbs and genitals were bitten off by the shark, complains for attention over an out of reach cup of water.

== Cast ==
- Aaron Taylor-Johnson as Dave Lizewski / Kick-Ass, a high schooler super hero and crimefighter
- Christopher Mintz-Plasse as Chris D'Amico / The Mother Fucker, son of deceased mobster Frank D'Amico and the new kingpin of NYC
- Chloë Grace Moretz as Mindy Macready / Hit-Girl, daughter of the late Big Daddy starting fresh in high school
- Clark Duke as Marty / Battle-Guy, Dave's friend
- Morris Chestnut as Detective Marcus Williams, Macready's former partner in the NYPD and Mindy's parental guardian. He was played by Omari Hardwick in the first film
- Jim Carrey as Sal Bertolinni / Colonel Stars and Stripes, a former hitman for the D'Amicos turned Born again-Christian and vigilante
- John Leguizamo as Javier, Chris D'Amico's consigliere
- Garrett M. Brown as Mr. Lizewski, Dave's father
- Augustus Prew as Todd / Ass-Kicker, Dave's friend
- Iain Glen as Ralph D'Amico, Frank's incarcerated brother who was originally running the D'Amicos
- Donald Faison as Samuel Keers / Doctor Gravity, a vigilante equipped with a modified metal bat
- Lindy Booth as Miranda Swedlow / Night-Bitch, a stripper turned vigilante hunting down her sister's killer
- Robert Emms as David Keers / Insect-Man
- Olga Kurkulina as Katarina Dombrovski / Mother Russia, a Russian ex-bodyguard with brute strength and Lieutenant in the Toxic Mega Cunts
- Andy Nyman as The Tumor / Tony, a short-tempered mobster and Lieutenant in the Toxic Mega Cunts
- Daniel Kaluuya as Black Death, an MMA fighter and Lieutenant in the Toxic Mega Cunts
- Tom Wu as Genghis Carnage, a triad hitman and Lieutenant in the Toxic Mega Cunts
- Yancy Butler as Angie D'Amico, Frank's widow
- Steven Mackintosh as Tommy's father, the male of a husband/wife duo searching for their missing son
- Monica Dolan as Tommy's mother, the female of a husband/wife duo searching for their missing son
- Claudia Lee as Brooke
- Ella Purnell as Dolce
- Benedict Wong as Mr. Kim
- Lyndsy Fonseca as Katie Deauxma, Dave's ex-girlfriend
- Sophie Wu as Erika Cho, Katie's friend
- Anthony J. Mifsud as Convict #1

Additionally, comic book creators Mark Millar and John Romita, Jr., former UFC Light Heavyweight Champion Chuck Liddell, and Aaron Taylor-Johnson's stepdaughter Angelica Jopling make cameo appearances in the film.

== Production ==
On 8 May 2012, it was reported that a sequel to Kick-Ass (2010) would be distributed by Universal Pictures who distributed the first film in the United Kingdom and some other territories, and that Matthew Vaughn had chosen Jeff Wadlow, who also wrote the script, to direct the sequel. Later that month, Aaron Taylor-Johnson and Chloë Grace Moretz entered negotiations to reprise their roles as Kick-Ass and Hit-Girl, respectively. Chad Gomez Creasey and Dara Resnik Creasey performed uncredited work on Wadlow's script to make Hit-Girl more feminine and less crass in light of Moretz's older age. In July 2012, Christopher Mintz-Plasse confirmed that he would return as Chris D'Amico who becomes the supervillain The Motherfucker. Mintz-Plasse expressed relief that a rape and child murder scene from the comic book would not be included in the film and went on to compare the gang violence in the story to the film The Warriors (1979). That same month, it was announced that John Leguizamo would play a character named Javier, one of The Motherfucker's bodyguards. In August 2012, it was reported that Donald Faison would play the superhero Doctor Gravity. Also that month, Yancy Butler was set to reprise her role as Angie D'Amico, Lyndsy Fonseca stated that she would return as Katie Deauxma in a smaller role, Robert Emms was cast as superhero Insect Man, Morris Chestnut was confirmed to replace Omari Hardwick as Hit-Girl's guardian Marcus Williams, Lindy Booth was confirmed to play Night Bitch, a superhero seeking to avenge the murder of her sister, Andy Nyman was announced to play one of the villains named The Tumor, and Claudia Lee joined the cast as Brooke, the leader of a gang of school bullies.

In September 2012, Jim Carrey was cast in the role of Colonel Stars and Stripes, the leader of superhero group Justice Forever. Also in September, Enzo Cilenti was confirmed to appear in the film. It was confirmed that bodybuilder Olga Kurkulina would portray the villainess Mother Russia. It was revealed that Clark Duke would reprise his role as Marty Eisenberg, who becomes the superhero Battle Guy, and that Augustus Prew would take over the role of Todd Haynes, who becomes the superhero Ass-Kicker, from Evan Peters. Principal photography began on 7 September 2012 in Mississauga, Ontario, Canada. Once filming in Mississauga wrapped in late September, the cast and crew continued shooting in London, England, at Ashmole Academy. Filming concluded on 23 November 2012.

== Release ==
Kick-Ass 2 was released theatrically on 14 August 2013 in the United Kingdom, 16 August in the United States, and 24 February 2014 in Japan by Universal Pictures for the former two, and Toho-Towa for the latter. It later released on DVD and Blu-ray Disc in the United States on 17 December that same year.

In the film's opening weekend, Kick-Ass 2 opened in fifth place, with $13.3 million, behind The Butler (in its first weekend), We're the Millers, Elysium, and Planes (all in their second weekends). This placed it below industry experts' expectation of around $15 million and studio higher hopes of as much as $19.8 million, in line with the first film. The film would gross $28.8 million in the United States and $32 million in other countries for a total gross of $60.8 million, much less than the first film's total of $96.1 million.

However, the movie was banned in Malaysia due to its vulgar title.

== Reception ==
On Rotten Tomatoes, the film has an approval rating of 33% based on 211 reviews and an average rating of 4.9/10. The site's critical consensus reads: "Kick-Ass 2 falls short in its attempt to emulate the original's unique blend of ultra-violence and ironic humor." On Metacritic, the film has a weighted average score of 41 out of 100 based on 35 critics, indicating "mixed or average" reviews. Audiences polled by CinemaScore gave the film an average grade of "B+" on an A+ to F scale.

Mark Olsen of the Los Angeles Times said "Kick-Ass 2 is a lesser version of what it appears to be, an uncertain jumble rather than a true exploration of outrage, violence and identity." Olsen found Hit-Girl dealing with ordinary life more interesting than Kick-Ass trying to be a superhero, but feels the story is marred by bad jokes about bodily functions. He criticised Taylor-Johnson's performance as "a charisma-free zone". Manohla Dargis of The New York Times said "There isn't anything good to say about Kick-Ass 2, the even more witless, mirthless follow-up to Kick-Ass." Dargis further criticised what she perceived to be misogyny and the poorly delivered jokes, as well as the director's failure to grasp the terrible beauty of violent imagery. PopMatters said "Like the age old admonition that too many cooks spoil the broth, Kick-Ass 2 suffers from having too many characters and not enough time to deal with them all." Gibron wishes there had been more time to explore the supporting characters, like Mother Russia. He notes the echoes of Carrie White in the Hit-Girl high school sequences. He suggests a Hit-Girl film would be preferable to "limp, unlikable results offered [by this film]".

Justin Chang of Variety said "Kick-Ass 2 improves on its 2010 predecessor in at least one respect: It doesn't make the mistake of trying to pass off its bone-crunching brutality as something shocking or subversive." John DeFore of The Hollywood Reporter said the "Sequel offers exactly the blend of R-rated nastiness and candy-colored action fans expect."

Peter Bradshaw of The Guardian said "The sequel to 2010's punk-superhero rampage has lost quite a bit of shock value – but Chloë Grace Moretz's Hit-Girl is still the coolest thing in a cape." Owen Williams, writing for Empire magazine, notes that despite the larger cast of characters this feels like a smaller film, and calls it a "faithful adaptation of its namesake source comic" and in the absence of Mark Strong he praises Mintz-Plasse for holding his own as the villain. He calls it a "more modest success than the first Kick-Ass" and gives it 3 out of 5 stars.

Filmmaker Quentin Tarantino named the film as one of the ten best he had seen in 2013.

=== Accolades ===
Award	Category	Recipients	Result
EDA Female Focus Award	Kick Ass Award for Best Female Action Star	Chloë Grace Moretz	Nominated
EDA Special Mention Award	Sequel or Remake That Shouldn't Have Been Made	Kick-Ass 2	Nominated
IGN Award	Best Comic Book Adaptation Movie	Kick-Ass 2	Nominated
MTV Movie Award	Summer's Biggest Teen Bad Ass	Chloë Grace Moretz	Won
Taurus Award and Taurus World Stunt Award	Best Stunt Coordinator and/or 2nd Unit Director; Best Fight	James O'Donnell as Jimmy O'Dee; Ashley Beck, James Embree and James Cox	Nominated

=== Home media ===
Kick-Ass 2 was released on digital download on 3 December 2013, and on Blu-ray and DVD on 17 December 2013 by Universal Pictures Home Entertainment. a 4K Ultra HD Blu-ray was released on September 12, 2023.

== Jim Carrey controversy ==
Several months before Kick-Ass 2 was released, Jim Carrey withdrew support for the film on account of the amount of violence in it in the wake of the Sandy Hook Elementary School shooting. Carrey wrote: "I did Kick-Ass a month before Sandy Hook and now in all good conscience I cannot support that level of violence. My apologies to others involved with the film. I am not ashamed of it but recent events have caused a change in my heart."

Mark Millar replied in his official forum, saying, "Yes, the body-count is very high, but a movie called Kick-Ass 2 really has to do with what it says on the tin," and compared it to films by Quentin Tarantino, Sam Peckinpah, Chan-wook Park, and Martin Scorsese. Millar insisted the film concentrated on the consequences of violence rather than the violence itself.

Moretz also commented, "It's a movie. If you are going to believe and be affected by an action film, you shouldn't go to see Pocahontas because you are going to think you are a Disney Princess. If you are that easily swayed, you might see The Silence of the Lambs and think you are a serial killer. It's a movie and it's fake, and I've known that since I was a kid... I don't want to run around trying to kill people and cuss. If anything, these movies teach you what not to do."

== Sequel ==
In April 2012, while Kick-Ass 2 was still in pre-production, Mark Millar stated that a third film was also planned. stating by the following year that it was intended to be the final installment, with Chloë Grace Moretz expressing interest in returning so-long as Matthew Vaughn would also return as director.

In February 2015, Vaughn revealed his intent to make a third film featuring Moretz and Aaron Taylor-Johnson reprising their roles, expressing interest in a Hit-Girl prequel film alongside Kick-Ass 3, confirming the film's development by that June.

In June 2018, Vaughn announced his intention to set up Marv Studios, under which banner he would produce new Kick-Ass films when the rights returned to him. In January 2019, Kevin Smith expressed interest in his limited series Hit-Girl In Hollywood serving as the basis of one of these films.

In December 2021, Vaughn revealed that the Kick-Ass rights would revert to him within two years, and by October 2023, the filmmaker confirmed a new film's development, which would focus on new characters and feature Moretz's and Taylor-Johnson's return in sequels.

In January 2024, Matthew Vaughn revealed that the third Kick-Ass film, titled Stuntnuts: The Movie, directed by Damien Walters, had secretly been greenlit, cast, and had already completed filming, and would be followed by two further Kick-Ass films, forming a trilogy: one under the working-title of Vram, and another also tentatively entitled Kick-Ass. Vaughn has stated that while the trilogy would include new characters, he also intends to include stars of the first two movies in the new trilogy as well. The film screened at the American Film Market on November 9, 2026.
