= Real-life superhero =

Person dressing up in a superhero costume

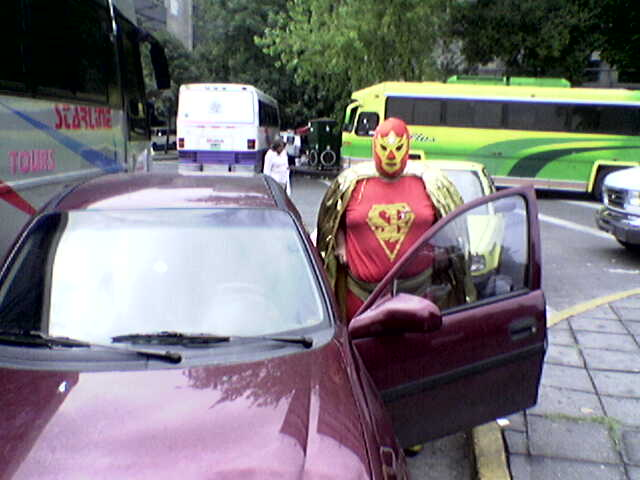
Real-life superhero Superbarrio Gómez

A real-life superhero (RLSH) is a person who dresses up in a superhero costume or mask in order to perform community service such as neighborhood watch, or in some cases vigilantism.

Early examples of this type of behavior are reported from the 1990s. One example is Mexico City's Superbarrio Gómez, who, in 1997, donned red tights and a red and yellow wrestler's mask in order to organize labor rallies, protest, and file petitions to prevent families from being evicted. A "real-life superhero community" in the sense of an online subculture began to develop in the mid-2000s.

== Reception ==
Police response to the actions of real life superheroes is typically negative. An article from The Globe and Mail reports that the police "fear for the safety of these 'superheroes' and argue that sometimes they can get in the way of police work and become a liability". Police have expressed concern that RLSH insert themselves into situations without knowing all the facts and indicate that this is "not a smart thing to do". Police have indicated that super heroes who physically involve themselves in preventing crimes are practicing vigilantism.

Different organizations have used the concept of the real-life superhero for other purposes. The Austrian artist collective, qujOchÖ created Miss Magnetiq as a parody of the real-life superhero phenomenon. Together with her companions Nickel, Cobalt and Mangan, Miss Magnetiq tries to protect the city of Linz from catastrophe but always fails.

Real-life superheroes have also been used for publicity and marketing campaigns. Super Vaclav was a 2011 promotional figure for a Czech webhosting company. Purporting to combat the antisocial behavior of Prague citizens, the company released YouTube videos featuring him pouring buckets of water on individuals smoking near public transport stops and assaulting dog owners with their own animal's excrement left behind in parks. While garnering many views, the campaign did not appear to translate into takeup of the webhost being advertised. Metro Woman was a short-lived publicity stunt in 2005 intended to gather support for the Washington Purple Line metro project.

== Fictional depictions ==
While superheroes in the strict sense are characters with superhuman powers, superhero fiction depicting vigilantes with no such powers have long been part of the genre, notably with Batman and Iron Man. Such characters are also known as "costumed crime fighters" or "masked vigilantes". With the development of the real-life superhero community, there have also been more realistic depictions of masked vigilantes in fiction performing the actions of real-life superheroes, such as in the comedy films Hero at Large, Super and Blankman, and the comic book Kick-Ass and its film adaptations. The concept has also been depicted in television series, including a story arc in the second season of Hill Street Blues (featuring a delusional man who believes himself to be a superhero and calls himself "Captain Freedom"), and the Hawaii Five-0 episode "Mai Ka Po Mai Ka 'oia'i'o (Truth Comes from the Night)".

== See also ==
- Hero
- Beyond Geek
- Local hero (Japan)
- Stan Lee's Superhumans
