= The Kingsman Shop (London) =

Luxury men's clothing store inspired by the Kingsman movies

- Facade of The Kingsman Shop

General information
- Location: 4 St. James's Street, London
- Opened: 8 September 2017
- Inaugurated: 7 September 2017

Website
- https://www.mrporter.com/en-us/

The Kingsman Shop was a luxury men's clothing store located in the St. James's shopping district of London. The store is one of the real filming locations for the movie Kingsman: The Golden Circle, and the items offered there are based on the appearance seen in the movie.

== History ==
Creation is the result of a partnership with the online retailer Mr Porter, Matthew Vaughn's Marv label, and 20th Century Fox. Mr Porter has previously collaborated with Kingsman, for the first film, Kingsman: The Secret Service, and continues to do so today.

The store was opened on 7 September 2017 by Matthew Vaughn alongside his wife Claudia Schiffer and Kingsman: The Golden Circle actor Mark Strong, the shop is officially opened on 8 September 2017, it is open for a temporary period of two months.

The store offers men's ready-to-wear, developed with Kingsman films costume designer Arianne Phillips and director Matthew Vaughn.

Prices range from £20 ($26,30) to several thousand dollars depending on the item. Director Matthew Vaughn has said he wants to open more stores for the next Kingsman films.
