= Kingsman: The Golden Circle =

2017 film by Matthew Vaughn

- Theatrical release poster
- Directed by: Matthew Vaughn
- Written by: Jane Goldman; Matthew Vaughn
- Based on: Kingsman by: Mark Millar; Dave Gibbons
- Produced by: Matthew Vaughn; David Reid; Adam Bohling
- Starring: Colin Firth; Julianne Moore; Taron Egerton; Mark Strong; Halle Berry; Elton John; Channing Tatum; Jeff Bridges
- Cinematography: George Richmond
- Edited by: Eddie Hamilton
- Music by: Henry Jackman; Matthew Margeson
- Production companies: Marv Films; Cloudy Productions
- Distributed by: 20th Century Fox
- Release dates: September 18, 2017 (London); September 20, 2017 (United Kingdom); September 22, 2017 (United States)
- Running time: 141 minutes
- Countries: United Kingdom; United States
- Language: English
- Budget: $104 million
- Box office: $411 million

Kingsman: The Golden Circle is a 2017 spy action comedy film directed by Matthew Vaughn and written by Jane Goldman and Vaughn. Based on the Kingsman (Note: After the release of film adaptation of The Secret Service, the comic series was retitled as Kingsman.) comic series, it is the sequel to Kingsman: The Secret Service (2014) and is the second installment in the Kingsman franchise. Its ensemble cast includes Colin Firth, Julianne Moore, Taron Egerton, Mark Strong, Halle Berry, Elton John, Channing Tatum, and Jeff Bridges. In the film, Kingsman team up with their American counterpart, Statesman, to pursue Poppy Adams (Moore) and her drug cartel, "The Golden Circle".

Development on a Kingsman sequel was announced in April 2015, with Vaughn confirmed as writer in June. Egerton's involvement was contingent on 20th Century Fox reaching an agreement with Lionsgate to resolve his shooting conflicts with Robin Hood (2018). Moore was cast in February 2016, with Berry joining one month later. Tatum joined in April, followed by Bridges in May, and Firth's return was confirmed that July. Principal photography began in May 2016 and lasted until that September, with filming taking place across Birmingham, London, Warner Bros. Studios, Leavesden and northern Italy. Henry Jackman and Matthew Margeson returned to compose the score and soundtrack for the film.

Kingsman: The Golden Circle premiered in London on 18 September 2017 and was theatrically released in the United Kingdom two days later, and in the United States on 22 September. It received mixed reviews from critics, with praise for its action but criticism for being reductive. It grossed $411 million worldwide. A prequel, The King's Man, was released on 22 December 2021, while a spin-off, Argylle, was released on 1 February 2024.

== Plot ==
A year after defeating Richmond Valentine, (Note: As depicted in Kingsman: The Secret Service (2014)) Gary "Eggsy" Unwin has officially joined the Kingsman intelligence service, taking his late mentor Harry Hart's title of "Galahad", and begun a relationship with Tilde, Crown Princess of Sweden. He is ambushed by Charlie Hesketh, a former Kingsman trainee who lost his arm and vocal cords during the Valentine incident and had them replaced with cybernetics. Eggsy evades Charlie and his henchmen in a car chase across London, but Charlie's severed cybernetic arm hacks into the Kingsman database through Eggsy's car. Charlie passes the information to Poppy Adams – leader of the world's largest drug cartel, the Golden Circle – who launches missiles to destroy the Kingsman headquarters and wipe out all its agents in Britain.

Eggsy and Merlin survive the attack, and Kingsman's emergency protocol leads them to Statesman, its American counterpart based in Kentucky that poses as a Bourbon whiskey distillery. There, they discover that Harry survived his shooting thanks to Statesman's nanotechnology but is suffering from amnesia. They also learn about the Golden Circle from Statesman leader Champagne, and the two agencies decide to collaborate to take down the cartel. Statesman agent Tequila develops a blue rash and exhibits signs of mania, resulting in his replacement by agent Whiskey as Eggsy's partner, while Merlin and Statesman Ginger Ale assist in curing Harry's amnesia. Eggsy implants a tracking device on Charlie's ex-girlfriend Clara during a sexual encounter at the Glastonbury Festival, but his disclosure of the mission to Tilde puts a strain on their relationship.

Eggsy cures Harry's amnesia by threatening to shoot a Cairn Terrier puppy that resembles Harry's late dog, shortly before Poppy broadcasts a message to the world about a toxin she has secretly added to all her drugs, which causes users to develop the blue rash and become manic before succumbing to paralysis and dying. She offers the antidote if the U.S. President ends his country's war on drugs and grants her cartel legal immunity. The President – who is revealed to be corrupt – decides to quarantine everyone affected, intending to let them all die to put Poppy out of business and rid the world of drug users. Eggsy, Harry, and Whiskey track Clara to the Golden Circle's antidote factory in the mountains of Italy. Eggsy steals an antidote sample, but it is broken by Whiskey during an ambush by the Golden Circle's henchmen, leading Harry to suspect him of working against them. Harry shoots Whiskey, but Eggsy, believing Harry to be delusional due to his recovery, saves him with nanotechnology.

Simultaneously, Charlie destroys the antidote factory, killing Clara for unwittingly betraying the Golden Circle. Tilde calls Eggsy, revealing she has been affected by the blue rash after taking drugs due to her stress over Eggsy's infidelity. Eggsy, Harry, and Merlin discover the location of Poppy's hideout, "Poppy Land", in Cambodia and fly there to steal the laptop that can deploy drones carrying the antidote. Arriving at Poppy Land, Eggsy steps on a land mine before Merlin switches places with him, sacrificing himself instead. Storming the lair, Eggsy kills Charlie while Harry destroys Poppy's robotic attack dogs with the help of Elton John, who had been kidnapped by Poppy. They secure the laptop and inject Poppy with a concentrated dose of her own toxin-infused heroin. Poppy gives them the laptop password in a drugged state before she dies from an overdose.

Whiskey interrupts them before they can deploy the drones, revealing that he wants all drug users to die after his pregnant wife was killed in a robbery by methamphetamine addicts. Furthermore, the elimination of all drugs will cause Statesman's stock price to skyrocket since people will become dependent on alcohol. Eggsy and Harry fight and kill Whiskey by pushing him into an industrial meat grinder, then deploy the drones to release the antidote, saving the affected victims. The President is impeached and arrested for conspiring to commit genocide against drug victims, and Statesman purchases a distillery in Scotland to help rebuild Kingsman. Ginger Ale is appointed to Whiskey's position, Eggsy marries Princess Tilde, and Tequila takes an exchange assignment at Kingsman, which acquires a new tailor shop in London.

== Cast ==
- Colin Firth as Harry Hart (Agent Galahad)
- Julianne Moore as Poppy Adams
- Taron Egerton as Gary “Eggsy” Unwin (Agent Galahad)
- Mark Strong as Merlin
- Halle Berry as Ginger Ale
- Pedro Pascal as Jack Daniels (Agent Whiskey)
- Edward Holcroft as Charlie Hesketh
- Hanna Alström as Princess Tilde of Sweden
- Emily Watson as Chief of Staff Fox
- Sophie Cookson as Roxy (Agent Lancelot)
- Elton John as himself
- Channing Tatum as Agent Tequila
- Jeff Bridges as Champagne "Champ"
- Keith Allen as Charles

In addition, Bruce Greenwood appears as the President of the United States, Michael Gambon portrays Arthur, Tobi Bakare returns as Eggsy's friend Jamal, and Poppy Delevingne portrays Charlie's ex-girlfriend Clara. Björn Granath (in his final film performance) and Lena Endre appear as the King and Queen of Sweden, and Samantha Womack returns briefly as Eggsy's mother, Michelle.

== Production ==
=== Development ===
Near the release of Kingsman: The Secret Service, Mark Millar and Matthew Vaughn said a sequel would be possible if the first film was to perform well at the box office, and Vaughn expressed interest in returning to direct. Vaughn also noted that he had hoped to have Firth back in the sequel, though it was later stated that Firth would not be returning.

On 29 April 2015, Fox announced that a sequel was in production, but that it was unclear if Vaughn would return due to his interest in directing a Flash Gordon film. On 11 June 2015, Vaughn told Yahoo that he had begun writing the script for the sequel, and that he could return to direct. In September 2015, Millar reiterated that the sequel was in development and that Vaughn was looking for ways to bring Firth back without sacrificing the integrity of the story. Later that month, The Hollywood Reporter confirmed that Egerton had also signed on for a new Robin Hood film, which was then set to begin shooting in February 2016; Egerton's schedule was thus in conflict with the Kingsman sequel. However, in mid-October, it was confirmed that scheduling issues had been settled between both studios. Lionsgate began Robin Hood's production right after Egerton wrapped filming on Kingsman: The Golden Circle, which began in May 2016.

=== Casting ===
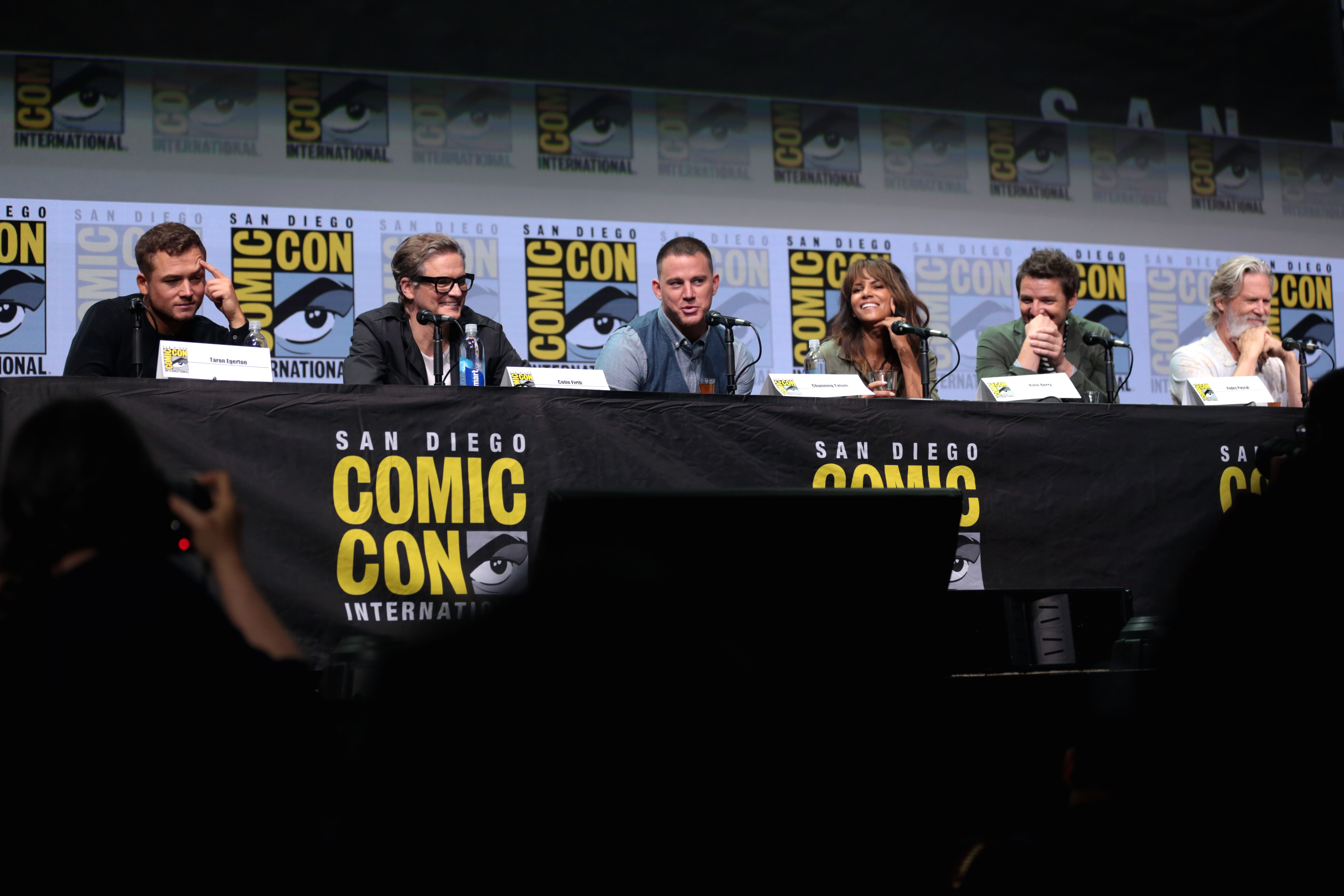
The cast of Kingsman: The Golden Circle at the 2017 San Diego Comic-Con.

On 17 February 2016, it was revealed that Julianne Moore was in negotiations to play the villain in the film. On 10 March 2016, Halle Berry was cast in the film, in a role that later turned out to be the Statesman's tech support. In late March, Vaughn confirmed Berry's and Moore's casting, as well as the title, Kingsman: The Golden Circle. On 8 April 2016, Pedro Pascal was cast in the film as Jack Daniels, and on the same day, a promotional poster was released featuring Firth's character's glasses, confirming Firth's return for the film; Firth's return was later officially confirmed on 11 July 2016. Channing Tatum confirmed his casting through his Twitter account, while Variety reported that Elton John was in talks for a role. (John would later be portrayed by co-star Egerton in 2019 movie Rocketman.) In late April, Vaughn talked about writing the sequel, and stated "writing this was the hardest thing I've ever done." Jeff Bridges was added to the cast on 28 May 2016. Vinnie Jones announced on Twitter that he had been cast, though he did not appear in the finished film.

=== Filming ===
Principal photography on the film began on 15 May 2016 in Birmingham. Filming also took place in Warner Bros. Studios, Leavesden. The cable car and antidote factory scenes were shot on Skyway Monte Bianco and Pointe Helbronner, located in Courmayeur, Aosta Valley, in northern Italy. On 13 September 2016, Kingsman: The Golden Circle completed initial filming. Additional footage was filmed on location in London in December 2016.

=== Music ===
Henry Jackman and Matthew Margeson reunited to compose the music for the film. The soundtrack was released on iTunes on 22 September 2017 by Fox Music and was released on CD in October 2017 by La-La Land Records.

== Release ==
20th Century Fox originally scheduled Kingsman: The Golden Circle for a summer release date of 16 June 2017 but pushed the film back to 6 October 2017. The film was then moved up to 20 September in the United Kingdom and 22 September 2017 in the United States.

The film was banned from cinemas in Cambodia since the villains' base is located in the ruins of a Cambodian temple.

=== Marketing ===
On 20 July 2017, Fox released an animated Kingsman/Archer crossover short film featuring Eggsy Unwin and Sterling Archer. On 18 September, Fox released a TV advert featuring a mock Kingsman board game.

The beige bomber jacket for Channing Tatum's character and a shearling coat worn by Colin Firth's Harry Hart were tailored by Cromford Leather, a UK designer brand and maker of luxury leather clothing. In May 2017, TAG Heuer partnered with Fox to make the TAG Heuer Connected the official watch of the Kingsman agents. In August 2017, Fox partnered with Old Forester to release a Statesman edition of their 95 proof Bourbon whisky for the U.S. market. In addition, GlenDronach released a Kingsman Edition 1991 of their scotch whisky. Director Vaughn cited GlenDronach as his favourite scotch whisky brand, and the distillery used casks from 1991, as it is the fictional year of Eggsy's birth. Only 240 bottles have been allocated to the U.S. market, all of which are signed by Vaughn. In addition, Berry Bros. & Rudd released a Kingsman edition of their No. 3 London Dry Gin. In September 2017, Hard Rock Cafe introduced the "Poppy Burger" in their menu to promote the film.

On 8 September 2017, luxury retailer Mr Porter opened its first Kingsman shop between Berry Bros. & Rudd and Lock & Co. Hatters on St James's Street in Central London. Both the Kingsman shop and Berry Bros. & Rudd were integral locations for this film, while Lock & Co. was featured in the first film.

In collaboration with German cosmetic line ARTDECO, ex-model and producer Claudia Schiffer unveiled the Claudia Schiffer Makeup line which featured two products inspired by the film—a 'Poppyland' lipstick and a 'Kingsman' nail polish. Additionally, products from that range were used for Poppy's Salon in the film.

=== Video games ===
In August 2017, it was confirmed that Kingsman: The Golden Circle would have a tie-in game to accompany its release, and that it would be a turn-based match-3 role-playing combat game, released on iOS and Android by the Korean mobile game company NHN PixelCube. The game also includes characters from Kingsman: The Secret Service, and was released globally on 14 September 2017, about a week before the film's release. Unlike the films, the game does not have graphic violence or explicit language, but it is classified a "12+" rating for "mild realistic violence". In the days before the film's release, another mobile game based on the Kingsman franchise, simply titled Kingsman: The Secret Service, was announced to be in development also for iOS and Android, by American mobile game developer YesGnome. The game is a hybrid action adventure-construction simulator, where players construct impregnable secret bases, similar to Fallout Shelter, while infiltrating enemy bases in run-and-gun missions based on the plot of at least the first film. The Android version remained in early access for many months. The Golden Circle is free-to-play, offers in-app purchases, and supports online player-versus-player multiplayer, while The Secret Service is sold as a paid game.

Several months later after the launch of the tie-in mobile game for Kingsman: The Golden Circle, on 24 April 2018, it was announced that the game's servers would be shut down on 23 May 2018, after "careful consideration" and the game's poor player base. Meanwhile, after many months in early access, Yesgnome's Kingsman: The Secret Service was finally released on 1 May 2019.

=== Home media ===
The film was released on Blu-ray on 12 December 2017 and DVD. A Target exclusive gift set includes four whiskey stones. The Walmart exclusive gift set comes with a Funko Pocket Pop! Eggsy keychain. A limited-edition steelbook packaging was available exclusively at Best Buy in the U.S., HMV in the UK, and JB Hi-Fi in Australia.

== Reception ==
=== Box office ===
Kingsman: The Golden Circle grossed $100 million domestically (United States and Canada), and $311 million in other territories, for a worldwide total of $411 million, against a budget of $104 million.

Domestically, the film's opening weekend grossed $39 million, an increase over the first instalment's $36.2 million debut; it topped the box office, overtaking two-time defender It. In its second weekend, the film again surpassed It to retain top spot, continuing an eventual run of five weeks in the Top 10 at the box office.

=== Critical response ===
Kingsman: The Golden Circle received generally mixed reviews. On the review aggregator website Rotten Tomatoes, 51% of 305 critics' reviews are positive, with an average rating of 5.4/10. The website's consensus reads: "Kingsman: The Golden Circle offers more of everything that made its predecessor so much fun but lacks the original's wild creative spark." Metacritic, which uses a weighted average, assigned the film a score of 44 out of 100, based on 44 critics, indicating "mixed or average" reviews. Audiences polled by CinemaScore gave the film an average grade of "B+" on an A+ to F scale.

Writing for Uproxx, Amy Nicholson called the film better than the first and wrote: "It's doubled down on the mayhem and hammered out the tone. Everything is sincere even when it's insane." Writing for Rolling Stone, Peter Travers gave the film 2.5 stars out of 4 and wrote: "Even when Kingsman: The Golden Circle goes off the rails and it inevitably does, this cracked caper wears you down with action and giggles."

Christopher Orr from The Atlantic said in his review: "The movie is too long, too violent, too silly – too everything. … To put it another way: First time satire, second time farce". Michael Phillips of the Chicago Tribune gave the film 1.5 stars and said that "Kingsman: The Golden Circle offers everything – several bored Oscar winners; two scenes featuring death by meat grinder; Elton John, mugging in close-up – except a good time." Wendy Ide, reviewing the film for The Guardian, gave it 1 star and called it "a knowing sneer of a movie that shrugs off its plot holes along with… a tendency to use female characters as the decorative punchline to jokes." Writing for RogerEbert.com, Glenn Kenny gave the film 0 out of 4 and wrote: "As action-packed as the movie is, it feels like it's six hours. That's in part because… the movie lurches twitchily from set piece to set piece…"

=== Accolades ===
Kingsman: The Golden Circle was nominated in four categories at the 2018 Golden Trailer Awards: "Team" (Create Advertising Group) for Best Action, "Poppy Dance" (Trailer Park, Inc.) for Best Action TV Spot (for a Feature Film) and Most Original TV Spot (for a Feature Film), and "Summer" for Best Radio / Audio Spot. The film won the Empire Award for Best Thriller at the 23rd Empire Awards. At the 44th Saturn Awards, it received a nomination for Best Action or Adventure Film.

== Franchise ==
Vaughn has stated that he and Goldman have a third Kingsman film planned. Although Vaughn initially suggested the series would be a trilogy, Mark Millar later confirmed at least two more films were in development, including a Kingsman/Hit-Girl crossover. In December 2017, Vaughn provided insight into his plans for the untitled third film. He confirmed there would be one "massive" new addition to the cast, though he has not decided who would play the role yet. In March 2018, Vaughn confirmed he was still working on the script for the third film. Although he did not reveal any new plot details, he said he has something big planned for it. In another interview, he teased the possible return of Mark Strong's Merlin, but did not confirm or deny the rumours. Vaughn revealed to Empire that he was planning a Kingsman movie which would cap-off the "Harry Hart-Eggsy relationship" trilogy. In May 2019, Vaughn told Digital Spy in an interview that "Kingsman 3" would be the final chapter of Hart and Eggsy.

A prequel to the franchise, The King's Man was released on 22 December 2021. On 9 November 2018, Egerton confirmed he would not appear for the prequel; however, he would still portray the character in future instalments, saying "I don't know how hot off the press this is, and I think I'm allowed to say it, but I'm not in the next Kingsman movie. That doesn't mean I won't be in Kingsman ever again. I was with Matthew Vaughn as little as a few days ago, we're still very much in business together, but his next journey in that world doesn't involve me." Before adding "His idea for the new one is incredibly exciting," Egerton continued. "I'm sad that I won't be on that journey with him but it's not the last you've seen of Eggsy." A crossover film, Argylle, directed by Vaughn and co-starring Henry Cavill as Agent Argylle of Kingsman, was released on 1 February 2024.

In October 2024, during an interview with The Hollywood Reporter, 20th Century Studios executive Steve Asbell revealed that the studio has no plans for any further Kingsman sequels or prequels.
