= Marv Studios =

British production company

Marv Studios Limited
- Logo used since 2021
- Formerly: Speed 5779 Limited (August–September 1996); SKA Productions Limited (September 1996–July 1999); SKA Films Limited (1999–2003); Marv Limited (October–November 2005); Marv Films Limited (November 2005–June 2018)
- Type: Production company
- Industry: Film and television production
- Founded: 1997; 29 years ago
- Founders: Guy Ritchie; Matthew Vaughn
- Headquarters: London, England (main)
- Key people: Matthew Vaughn
- Products: Films, television series
- Website: www.marv.com

Marv Studios, formerly SKA Films, is a British independent production company owned and co-founded by Matthew Vaughn. It is best known for the motion pictures Layer Cake, Stardust, Kick-Ass, Kingsman: The Secret Service, Kingsman: The Golden Circle and The King's Man. The company name is an acronym deriving from Vaughn’s birth name: Matthew Allard Robert Vaughn.

== History ==
=== SKA Films ===
In 1997, producer Matthew Vaughn and director Guy Ritchie launched their own company in the United Kingdom, with its first project being Lock, Stock and Two Smoking Barrels, which is for Handmade Films.

In 1999, Vaughn and Ritchie struck an agreement with Sony Pictures to distribute its next project, Snatch.

The team followed it up with their next big project Swept Away, starring Madonna. The film ended up being bombed critically and commercially. It went on to win the Golden Raspberry Awards in 2003.

=== Marv Films / Marv Studios ===
Later that same year, Ritchie and Vaughn broke up ties, thus rebranding from SKA Films to Marv Films, and its first production under the new banner was Matthew Vaughn's directorial debut Layer Cake.

In 2007, it signed a deal with Sony Pictures Entertainment to produce its feature films. Later that same year, Charlie Mitchell joined the company.

In 2009, Kris Thykier decided to leave Marv Films, in order to set up PeaPie Films, to produce new feature films.

In 2018, Vaughn launched its subsidiary Marv Studios to set up new feature film reboots.

=== Marv Music ===
In 2021, Marv launched a record label, Marv Music, in conjunction with Warner Music Group. The label is distributed under Warner's Parlophone unit.

=== Logo design ===
The logo is notable due to its ever changing design over the years and depending on what movie it is attached to. It was initially the basic name written in Times New Roman over a regular background, until the release of Kick-Ass where the letters were presented in colorful paint over a blue background.

The logo soon gained notoriety starting with the release of Kick-Ass 2. The logo begins showcasing a Monocrhome CRT style first person shooting game before the camera pans up into a green dotted constellation. The green dots combine with red dots forming the MARV logo in an Ishihara plate design. This was done in reference to Matthew Vaughn himself who is color blind.

The current logo is that of a pair of rolling dice, with the black dots formed to resemble the individual letters of MARV.

== Films ==
Title	Release date	Director	Producer	Writer	Production company	Distributor	Rotten Tomatoes
as SKA Films
Lock, Stock and Two Smoking Barrels	28 August 1998	Guy Ritchie	Matthew Vaughn	Guy Ritchie	HandMade Films; The Steve Tisch Company; Summit Entertainment	Gramercy Pictures; Columbia TriStar Film Distributors International; PolyGram Filmed Entertainment	75%
Snatch	23 August 2000	Guy Ritchie	Matthew Vaughn	Guy Ritchie		Screen Gems	73%
Mean Machine	26 December 2001	Barry Skolnick	Matthew Vaughn	Tracy Keenan Wynn; Charlie Fletcher; Chris Baker; Andrew Day		Paramount Pictures	34%
Swept Away	11 October 2002	Guy Ritchie	Matthew Vaughn	Guy Ritchie	CODI SpA	Screen Gems	5%
as Marv Films
Layer Cake	1 October 2004	Matthew Vaughn	Adam Bohling; David Reid; Matthew Vaughn	J. J. Connolly		Sony Pictures Classics (Worldwide); Columbia Pictures (UK and Ireland)	81%
Stardust	19 October 2007	Matthew Vaughn	Lorenzo di Bonaventura; Michael Dreyer; Neil Gaiman; Matthew Vaughn	Jane Goldman; Matthew Vaughn	Ingenious Media	Paramount Pictures	76%
Harry Brown	11 November 2009	Daniel Barber	Matthew Vaughn; Kris Thykier; Matthew Brown; Keith Bell	Gary Young	UK Film Council; HanWay Films; Prescience; Framestore Features	Lionsgate	64%
Kick-Ass	26 March 2010	Matthew Vaughn	Matthew Vaughn; Brad Pitt; Kris Thykier; Adam Bohling; Tarquin Pack; David Reid	Jane Goldman; Matthew Vaughn	Plan B Entertainment	Lionsgate; Universal Pictures	75%
The Debt	30 September 2011	John Madden	Matthew Vaughn; Kris Thykier	Matthew Vaughn; Jane Goldman; Peter Straughan		Focus Features; Miramax	76%
Kick-Ass 2	14 August 2013	Jeff Wadlow	Adam Bohling; Tarquin Pack; David Reid; Matthew Vaughn	Jeff Wadlow	Plan B Entertainment; Dentsu	Universal Pictures	31%
Kingsman: The Secret Service	13 February 2015	Matthew Vaughn	Matthew Vaughn; David Reid; Adam Bohling	Jane Goldman; Matthew Vaughn	Cloudy Productions; Shangri-La Entertainment	20th Century Fox	74%
Fantastic Four	7 August 2015	Josh Trank	Gregory Goodman; Simon Kinberg; Robert Kulzer; Hutch Parker; Matthew Vaughn	Jeremy Slater; Simon Kinberg; Josh Trank	Marvel Entertainment; Constantin Film; Kinberg Genre; Robert Kulzer Productions	20th Century Fox	9%
Eddie the Eagle	26 February 2016	Dexter Fletcher	Adam Bohling; David Reid; Rupert Maconick; Valerie Van Galder; Matthew Vaughn	Sean Macaulay; Simon Kelton	Studio Babelsberg; Saville Productions	20th Century Fox	80%
Kingsman: The Golden Circle	20 September 2017	Matthew Vaughn	Matthew Vaughn; David Reid; Adam Bohling	Jane Goldman; Matthew Vaughn	Cloudy Productions	20th Century Fox	51%
Rocketman	31 May 2019	Dexter Fletcher	Adam Bohling; David Furnish; David Reid; Matthew Vaughn	Lee Hall	Rocket Pictures; New Republic Pictures	Paramount Pictures	89%
as Marv Studios
Silent Night	3 December 2021	Camille Griffin	Matthew Vaughn; Trudie Styler; Celine Rattray	Camille Griffin	Endeavor Content; Maven Screen Media	AMC+ RLJE Films	65%
The King's Man	22 December 2021	Matthew Vaughn	Matthew Vaughn; David Reid; Adam Bohling	Matthew Vaughn; Karl Gajdusek	Cloudy Productions	20th Century Studios	43%
Tetris	31 March 2023	Jon S. Baird	Matthew Vaughn; Leonard Blavatnik; Gregor Cameron; Gillian Berrie	Noah Pink	Apple Studios; AI Film; Unigram	Apple TV+	81%
Argylle	2 February 2024	Matthew Vaughn	Matthew Vaughn; Adam Bohling; David Reid; Jason Fuchs	Jason Fuchs	Apple Studios; Cloudy Productions	Apple TV+ Universal Pictures	35%
Shiver	13 August 2027	Tim Miller	Matthew Vaughn; Aaron Ryder	Ian Shorr	Ryder Picture Company	Warner Bros. Pictures	TBA
Stuntnuts: The Movie	TBA	Damien Walters	Matthew Vaughn; Joby Stephens; Morgan Carlson; Luke Gomes; Christopher Tomkins	Damien Walters	Zebbo Films	TBA	TBA
Stuntnuts Does School Fight	TBA	Damien Walters	Matthew Vaughn; Joby Stephens; Morgan Carlson; Luke Gomes; Christopher Tomkins	Damien Walters	Zebbo Films	TBA	TBA

== Television ==
Title	First aired	Last aired	Showrunner	Co-production	Network	Notes
as SKA Films
Lock, Stock...	29 May 2000	11 July 2000	Guy Ritchie	Ginger Productions	Channel 4	
Swag	23 March 2003	3 August 2004	Guy Ritchie	Monkey Kingdom	Five	
