= Eddie the Eagle (film) =

2015 film by Dexter Fletcher

- U.K. theatrical release poster
- Directed by: Dexter Fletcher
- Screenplay by: Sean Macaulay; Simon Kelton
- Story by: Simon Kelton
- Produced by: Adam Bohling; David Reid; Rupert Maconick; Valerie Van Galder; Matthew Vaughn
- Starring: Taron Egerton; Hugh Jackman; Christopher Walken; Iris Berben; Jim Broadbent
- Cinematography: George Richmond
- Edited by: Martin Walsh
- Music by: Matthew Margeson
- Production companies: Marv; Studio Babelsberg; Saville Productions
- Distributed by: Lionsgate (UK/Ireland); 20th Century Fox (Worldwide)
- Release dates: December 12, 2015 (Butt-Numb-A-Thon); February 26, 2016 (United States); March 28, 2016 (United Kingdom); March 31, 2016 (Germany)
- Running time: 106 minutes
- Countries: United Kingdom; United States; Germany
- Language: English
- Budget: $23 million
- Box office: $46.2 million

Eddie the Eagle is a 2015 biographical sports comedy-drama film directed by Dexter Fletcher. The film stars Taron Egerton as Michael "Eddie the Eagle" Edwards, a British skier who in 1988 became the first competitor to represent Great Britain in Olympic ski jumping since 1928. Hugh Jackman, Christopher Walken, Iris Berben and Jim Broadbent co-star. The film had its first public screening at the Butt-Numb-A-Thon in Austin, Texas on December 12, 2015 and its world premiere at the 2016 Sundance Film Festival on January 26, 2016.

The film was released in the United States on February 26, 2016, by 20th Century Fox and in the United Kingdom on March 28, 2016, by Lionsgate.

The film received generally positive reviews from critics and in 2017 it was nominated for the Empire Award for Best British Film.

== Plot ==
From a young age, Michael "Eddie" Edwards harbours Olympic aspirations. When his efforts to compete in the Summer Games fail, he tries out skiing in the Winter Games. Although skilled at the sport, he is rejected by British Olympic officials for being uncouth. Realising he could make the team as a ski jumper, a sport which the United Kingdom has not participated in for six decades, Eddie decamps to a training facility in Garmisch-Partenkirchen, West Germany.

Eddie self-trains, and after completing the 15-metre (49 ft) hill on his first try, he injures himself on his first attempt at a 40-metre (130 ft) slope. Bronson Peary, an American former ski jumper who left the sport after a conflict with his mentor, Warren Sharp, decides to train Eddie. With very little time to qualify for the 1988 Winter Olympics in Calgary, Eddie and Bronson employ various unorthodox methods to refine Eddie's form, and he successfully completes the 40m jump.

To qualify for the British Olympic division in ski jumping, Eddie must complete a jump from a 70-metre (230 ft) hill. He succeeds and earns himself a place on the British Olympic Team. In an effort to keep Eddie from entering the Winter Games, the officials demand that he jump 61 metres (200 ft). Eddie improves and eventually lands a 61-metre practice jump, which unexpectedly qualifies him after he fails to repeat it officially. Bronson advises Eddie to train for four more years and compete in the 1992 Games to avoid embarrassment, but Eddie is undeterred.

Eddie's arrival in Calgary is met with disdain from his Norwegian rivals, who get him intoxicated so that he misses the opening ceremonies. Despite finishing last in the 70m jump with a British record of 60.5 metres (198 ft), Eddie's enthusiastic celebrations endear him to the audience, and the media dubs him Eddie "the Eagle". After Bronson criticizes Eddie's lack of seriousness, Eddie apologizes publicly and enters the 90-metre (300 ft) jump, which he has never attempted. Moved by Eddie's dedication, Bronson travels to Calgary to offer his support.

After an encouraging conversation with his idol, Matti "The Flying Finn" Nykänen, Eddie miraculously lands a 90-metre jump. Again, he comes in last, but his performance earns him recognition in the closing speech of the President of the Organising Committee for the Olympic Games. Warren Sharp reconciles with Bronson, and Eddie returns home a national hero.

== Cast ==
- Taron Egerton as Michael Edwards
  - Tom Costello as Michael Edwards at age 10
  - Jack Costello as Michael Edwards at age 15
- Hugh Jackman as Bronson Peary
- Christopher Walken as Warren Sharp
- Iris Berben as Petra
- Mark Benton as Richmond, a BOA official
- Keith Allen as Terry Edwards, Eddie's father
- Jo Hartley as Janette Edwards, Eddie's mother
- Ania Sowinski as Carrie
- Tim McInnerny as Dustin Target
- Edvin Endre as Matti "The Flying Finn" Nykänen
- Marc Benjamin as Lars Holbin
- Jim Broadbent as a BBC commentator
- Daniel Ings as Zach
- Rune Temte as Bjørn, a Norwegian coach

== Production ==
=== Development ===
Eddie the Eagle is a co-production of Marv Films (UK), Studio Babelsberg (Germany) and Saville Productions (US).

Development on the film was first reported in 2007 as a project of Irish director Declan Lowney with Steve Coogan to appear in the lead role. In 2009 Rupert Grint was reportedly linked to the role of Edwards.

In March 2015, it was announced that 20th Century Fox had acquired the film, with Taron Egerton and Hugh Jackman starring and Dexter Fletcher directing, from a screenplay by Sean Macaulay and Simon Kelton. Egerton would portray Eddie "The Eagle" Edwards, while Jackman would portray Bronson Peary, his coach; Jackman's character was confirmed as fictional by Eddie Edwards. It was also announced that Matthew Vaughn, who produced Kingsman: The Secret Service, would reunite with the studio, serving as a producer on the film, while Adam Bohling, David Reid, Rupert Maconick and Valerie Van Galde would also serve as producers. That same month, it was announced that Christopher Walken had joined the film, portraying the role of Jackman's character's mentor.

The film received funds of €2.2 million from the German Federal Film Fund (DFFF).

=== Filming ===
Principal photography took place in Oberstdorf and Garmisch-Partenkirchen in Bavaria, in Seefeld in Tirol, at the Pinewood Studios and in London from 9 March to 3 May 2015. Dry slope scenes were filmed at a dry ski slope in Bracknell, Berkshire, England.

== Release ==
In March 2015, it was announced 20th Century Fox would distribute the film in the United States of America. The studio set 29 April 2016 for the release of the film. That same month, it was announced that Lionsgate had acquired United Kingdom distribution rights to the film, with a spring 2016 release planned. In October 2015, Lionsgate set a release date for the film for 1 April 2016. The date was then moved forward to 28 March 2016. The same month, it was announced that the film had delayed to 26 February in the United States. The film had its world premiere at the 2016 Sundance Film Festival as a "Surprise Screening" on 26 January 2016. The subsequent London premiere took place on 17 March 2016.

=== Home media ===
Eddie the Eagle was released on DVD, Blu-ray and Ultra HD Blu-ray on June 14, 2016, by 20th Century Fox Home Entertainment.

== Soundtrack ==
Fly (Songs Inspired by the Film Eddie the Eagle), curated by Gary Barlow, was released on 18 March 2016. It features new songs by Tony Hadley, Marc Almond, Holly Johnson, Paul Young, Kim Wilde, Andy Bell, Midge Ure, Nik Kershaw, ABC, Deacon Blue, Van Halen, Go West, Howard Jones, OMD and Heaven 17. It is an album of new studio recordings and original songs, curated by Barlow at the behest of producer Matthew Vaughn.

Eddie the Eagle (Original Motion Picture Score) was released a week before the curated album above, and features the film's original score by Matthew Margeson.

== Reception ==
=== Box office ===
Eddie the Eagle grossed a worldwide total of $46.1 million. In the UK, it grossed $12.8 million, making it the highest grossing British film released in the UK in 2016. In the United States, the film debuted to $8.1 million, finishing third.

=== Critical response ===
On Rotten Tomatoes, the film has a rating of 82% based on 199 reviews, with an average rating of 6.60/10. The site's consensus reads, "Eddie the Eagle's amiable sweetness can't disguise its story's many inspirational clichés – but for many viewers, it will be more than enough to make up for them." On Metacritic the film has a score of 54 out of 100, based on reviews from 34 critics, indicating "mixed or average" reviews. Audiences polled by CinemaScore gave the film an average grade of "A" on an A+ to F scale.

Alonso Duralde of TheWrap wrote, "Eddie the Eagle is designed for audiences who will throw their weight behind the film's schmaltz and sentimentality. Anyone unwilling to commit to the movie's shamelessness will feel like they've hit the ground headfirst." KenyaBuzz called it a must-watch saying it is "positively impetuous and unbearably affectionate." A reviewer who attended the events in which the real Eddie competed, wrote "three generations of my family loved this film. You can't believe most of it, but you can believe in it. That's a subtle but important difference."

=== Accolades ===
Award	Date of ceremony	Category	Recipient(s)	Result	Ref.
Empire Awards	19 March 2017	Best British Film	Eddie the Eagle	Nominated	
Golden Tomato Awards	12 January 2017	Best British Movie 2016	Eddie the Eagle	5th Place	
Golden Trailer Awards	4 May 2016	Best Animation Family	"Sport"	Nominated	
Teen Choice Awards	31 July 2016	Choice Movie Actor: Drama	Taron Egerton	Nominated	

== See also ==
- Cool Runnings
