= Matthew Vaughn =

English filmmaker (born 1971)

Sir Matthew Vaughn
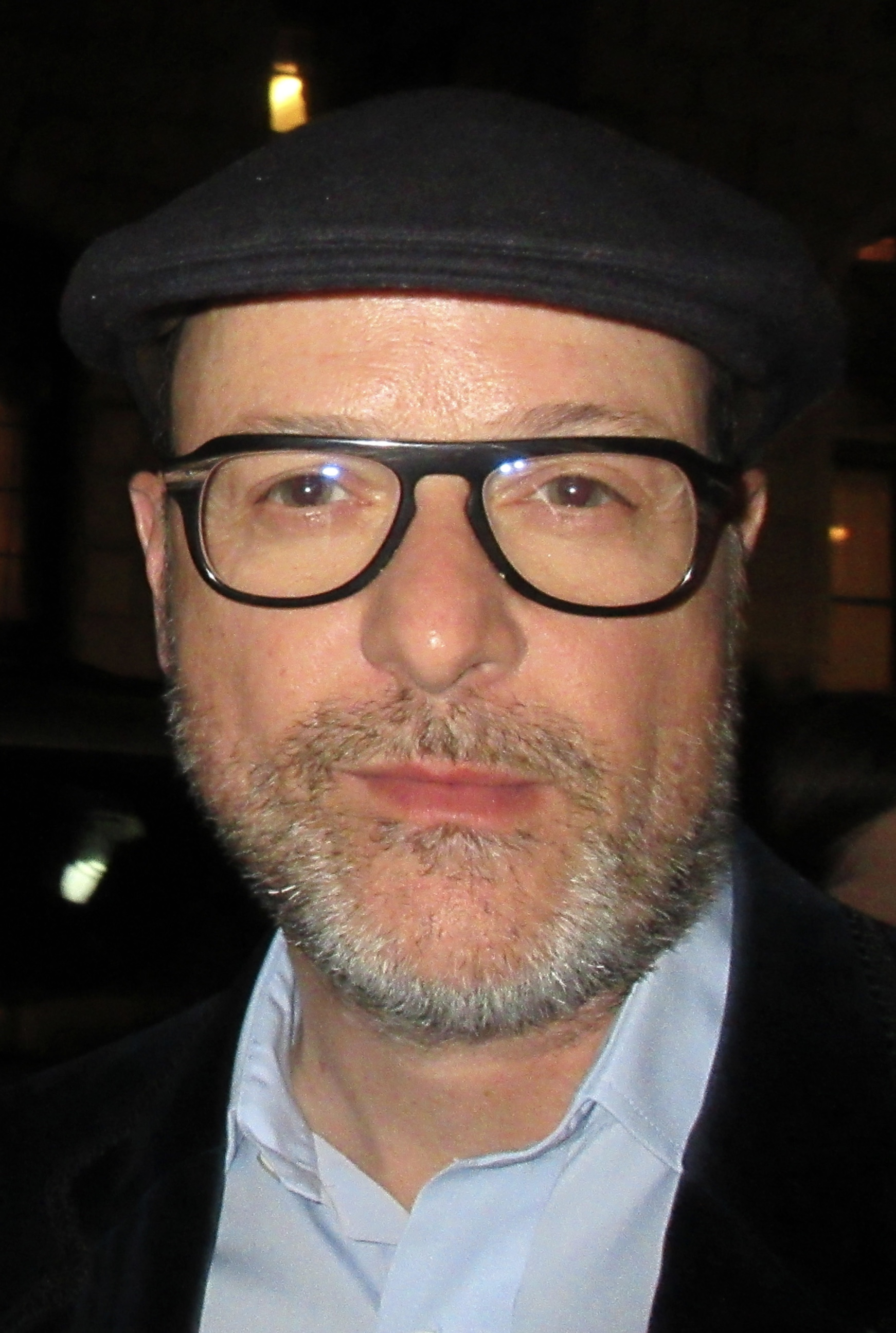
- Vaughn in 2019
- Born: Matthew Allard Robert Vaughn; 7 March 1971 (age 55); London, England
- Other name: Matthew Allard de Vere Drummond (since 2002)
- Occupations: Film director; film producer; screenwriter
- Years active: 1996–present
- Spouse: Claudia Schiffer (m. 2002)
- Children: 3

Sir Matthew Allard de Vere Drummond (born Matthew Allard Robert Vaughn; 7 March 1971) is an English filmmaker. Vaughn has produced films including Lock, Stock and Two Smoking Barrels (1998) and Snatch (2000), and directed Layer Cake (2004), Stardust (2007), Kick-Ass (2010), X-Men: First Class (2011), and Argylle (2024). Vaughn also co-created the Kingsman comic book series and resulting franchise, directing, producing and co-writing the films from Kingsman: The Secret Service (2014), Kingsman: The Golden Circle (2017), and The King's Man (2021).

== Early life ==
Vaughn was born in Paddington, London, on 7 March 1971. His mother was Kathy Ceaton (died 20 July 2013), daughter of electrical and property tycoon James Ceaton, and a former wife of Pakistani millionaire Javaid Saigol. Until 2002, Vaughn believed that he was the child of a relationship between his mother, a production manager and producer, and American actor Robert Vaughn. A paternity investigation in the 1980s revealed that Robert Vaughn was not his father, but Ceaton had never disclosed this to her son. Upon asking his mother about his true paternity, she admitted that Vaughn's biological father was George Albert Harley de Vere Drummond, an English banker, aristocrat and son of George Henry de Vere Drummond. Early in Vaughn's life, Robert Vaughn had asked for the child's surname to be the same as his, and Vaughn continues to be his professional name, though he uses de Vere Drummond in his personal life, having changed it by deed poll in May 2002.

Vaughn's early education was at Sussex House School in central London, followed by Stowe School in Buckinghamshire. From 2017 until 2022, he was the president of the Old Stoics, a society for former students of Stowe School.

== Career ==
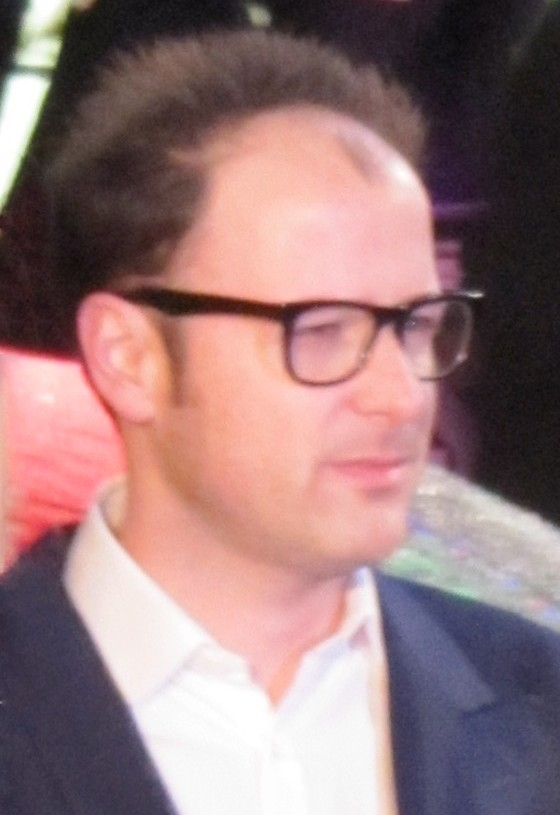
Vaughn in 2010

Aged 25, Vaughn produced a low-budget thriller, The Innocent Sleep (1996), starring Annabella Sciorra and Michael Gambon. He continued as a producer on his friend Guy Ritchie's film Lock, Stock and Two Smoking Barrels. The film was a critical, popular and financial success, earning Vaughn and Ritchie £9 million each. Vaughn later produced Ritchie's Snatch and Swept Away.

Vaughn made his directorial debut in 2004 with Layer Cake. The film was well received and its success led to Vaughn being tapped to direct X-Men: The Last Stand (2006), but he dropped out only two weeks before filming began. Subsequently, he said the film was "pretty good" given the limited time they had to make it, but he was critical of Brett Ratner's direction of the film. For his next project, he co-wrote and directed Stardust, followed by a movie adaptation of Mark Millar's Kick-Ass in 2010. Vaughn directed and co-wrote the first film in the prequel trilogy of the X-Men film universe titled X-Men: First Class (2011). Vaughn was signed to return to the series as director of the sequel, X-Men: Days of Future Past (2014), but dropped out in favour of Bryan Singer, who had directed the first two films in the original trilogy, X-Men and X2. Vaughn remained attached to the film by co-writing the script.

Vaughn's next directorial project, was Kingsman: The Secret Service (2014), an adaptation of the comic book The Secret Service created by Millar and Dave Gibbons from a concept by Millar and an initially uncredited Vaughn himself (Vaughn being credited as the comic's co-creator on all republications since 2014). The film was scripted by Vaughn and Jane Goldman, and produced by Vaughn's production company Marv Films. Vaughn returned to direct, produce, and co-write the Kingsman sequel, Kingsman: The Golden Circle, which was released in theaters in September 2017. Vaughn also directed and provided the story for The King's Man, the third installment in the franchise serving as a prequel to the original film. Delayed from November 2019 due to both the schedule shuffle following Disney's acquisition of 21st Century Fox and the subsequent COVID-19 pandemic, the film was released on 22 December 2021.

In March 2017, Collider reported that Vaughn was top choice to direct Man of Steel 2; in September of that year, Vaughn confirmed that he was in negotiations with the studio to helm the project. By March 2019, Vaughn stated that discussions with Warner Bros. had ended, and he was no longer involved with development of the film.

Vaughn began working on spy film Argylle in 2021, an original story written by Jason Fuchs and starring an ensemble cast including Henry Cavill, Sam Rockwell, Bryce Dallas Howard, Samuel L. Jackson, Bryan Cranston and John Cena. The film premiered in January 2024, and was released by Universal Pictures and Apple Original Films.

In January 2024, Vaughn announced that he would be producing a third Kick-Ass film, titled Stuntnuts Does School Fight, directed by his longtime stunt coordinator Damien Walters in his feature film debut, which had secretly already been greenlit and had completed filming. also announcing two further films in the Kick-Ass franchise to be in development, to be produced by him as a trilogy, under the working titles Vram and Kick-Ass.

In April 2025, Vaughn announced his involvement in a new film production studio, "UR•MARV", in collaboration with Portuguese footballer Cristiano Ronaldo.

== Personal life ==
On 25 May 2002, Vaughn married German supermodel Claudia Schiffer in Suffolk. The couple have a son and two daughters, the youngest born in 2010. They have resided at Coldham Hall, Stanningfield, Suffolk, since 2002, and also have homes in Notting Hill, London and Northamptonshire.

Vaughn has identified himself politically as a conservative and a supporter of the Conservative Party. According to a 2015 article by The Guardian, Vaughn has served on the committee of a Tory fundraising ball, and had been one of the 103 signatories of a letter sent to The Daily Telegraph, that backed David Cameron and George Osborne’s lowering of the corporation tax and criticised Ed Miliband's attempt to introduce a law banning zero-hour contracts.

Vaughn was appointed a Knight Bachelor in the 2024 Prime Minister's Resignation Honours for services to the creative industries.

Vaughn is a minority stakeholder in English Premier league team Brentford. In February 2026, he doubled his investment in Brentford, injecting an additional £40 million to strengthen the club as it targeted European qualification.

== Filmography ==
=== Film ===
Year	Title	Director	Writer	Producer
2004	Layer Cake	Yes	No	Yes
2007	Stardust	Yes	Yes	Yes
2010	Kick-Ass	Yes	Yes	Yes
2010	The Debt	No	Yes	Yes
2011	X-Men: First Class	Yes	Yes	No
2014	X-Men: Days of Future Past	No	Story	Yes
2014	Kingsman: The Secret Service	Yes	Yes	Yes
2017	Kingsman: The Golden Circle	Yes	Yes	Yes
2021	The King's Man	Yes	Yes	Yes
2024	Argylle	Yes	No	Yes

Producer only

- The Innocent Sleep (1996)
- Lock, Stock and Two Smoking Barrels (1998)
- Snatch (2000)
- Mean Machine (2001)
- Swept Away (2002)
- A Short Film About John Bolton (2003)
- Harry Brown (2009)
- Kick-Ass 2 (2013)
- Fantastic Four (2015)
- Eddie the Eagle (2016)
- Rocketman (2019)
- Bloodshot (2020) (Executive producer)
- Silent Night (2021)
- Tetris (2023)
- Shiver (2027)
- Stuntnuts: The Movie (TBA)
- Stuntnuts Does School Fight (TBA)

=== Television ===
Executive producer

- Lock, Stock... (2000)
- Swag (2003)
- Make My Day (2003) (Documentary)

=== Video game ===
Producer

- Kick-Ass: The Game (2010)

== Frequent collaborators ==
Actors and actresses

Work Actor
Work Actor	Layer Cake	Stardust	Kick-Ass	X-Men: First Class	Kingsman: The Secret Service	Kingsman: The Golden Circle	The King's Man	Argylle	Stuntnuts: The Movie	Total
Randall Batinkoff			check	check						2
Geoff Bell		check			check					2
Sofia Boutella					check			check		2
Henry Cavill		check						check		2
Sophie Cookson					check	check				2
Taron Egerton					check	check				2
Colin Firth					check	check				2
Jason Flemyng	check	check	check	check						4
Dexter Fletcher	check	check	check							3
Michael Gambon	check					check				2
Tamer Hassan	check		check							2
Edward Holcroft					check	check				2
Hanna Alström					check	check				2
Samuel L. Jackson					check			check		2
Aaron Taylor-Johnson			check				check			2
Corey Johnson			check	check	check					3
Sienna Miller	check	check								2
Sam Rockwell								check	check	2
Mark Strong		check	check		check	check				4
Samantha Womack					check	check				2

Film crew

Work Crew
Work Crew	Layer Cake	Stardust	Kick-Ass	X-Men: First Class	Kingsman: The Secret Service	Kingsman: The Golden Circle	The King's Man	Argylle	Stuntnuts: The Movie	Total
Adam Bohling	check		check		check	check	check	check		6
Ben Davis	check	check	check				check		check	5
Jane Goldman		check	check	check	check	check				5
Eddie Hamilton			check	check	check	check				4
Jon Harris	check	check	check		check		check			5
Henry Jackman			check	check	check	check				4
Matthew Margeson			check	check	check	check	check			5
George Richmond					check	check		check		3
Lee Smith				check				check		2
Take That		check		check	check					3
