= Ben Davis (cinematographer) =

British cinematographer (b. 1961)

- Born: Benjamin Davis; 6 September 1961 (age 65); London, England
- Years active: 1986–present
- Spouse: Camille Griffin (m. 2005)
- Children: 5, including Roman Griffin Davis

Benjamin Davis BSC (born 6 September 1961) is an English cinematographer. He is known for his work with directors Martin McDonagh, Matthew Vaughn, and John Madden, and on several Marvel Cinematic Universe (MCU) productions.

== Early life ==
Davis was born in London in 1963. His father was cinematographer and camera operator Michael J. Davis.

== Career ==
Davis started his career at Samuelsons Camera House, now a part of the motion picture equipment company Panavision. He worked as clapper loader, focus puller, and camera operator in both feature films and commercials. During this period, he worked with cinematographers Billy Williams, Douglas Slocombe and Roger Deakins.

He began his career as a cinematographer shooting spots, before making his debut with the British film Miranda (2002).

== Personal life ==
Davis is married to writer and director Camille Griffin. Their son is actor Roman Griffin Davis.

== Filmography ==
Key
†	Denotes titles that have not yet been released

=== Film ===
Year	Title	Director	Notes
2002	Miranda	Marc Munden	
2004	Layer Cake	Matthew Vaughn	
2005	Imagine Me & You	Ol Parker	
2007	Hannibal Rising	Peter Webber	
2007	Stardust	Matthew Vaughn	
2007	Virgin Territory	David Leland	
2008	Franklyn	Gerald McMorrow	
2008	Incendiary	Sharon Maguire	
2010	Kick-Ass	Matthew Vaughn	
2010	Tamara Drewe	Stephen Frears	
2010	The Debt	John Madden	
2011	The Best Exotic Marigold Hotel	John Madden	
2011	The Rite	Mikael Håfström	
2012	Seven Psychopaths	Martin McDonagh	
2012	Wrath of the Titans	Jonathan Liebesman	
2013	I Give It a Year	Dan Mazer	
2014	A Long Way Down	Pascal Chaumeil	
2014	Before I Go to Sleep	Rowan Joffé	
2014	Guardians of the Galaxy	James Gunn	
2015	Avengers: Age of Ultron	Joss Whedon	
2016	Doctor Strange	Scott Derrickson	
2016	Genius	Michael Grandage	
2017	Three Billboards Outside Ebbing, Missouri	Martin McDonagh	
2019	Captain Marvel	Anna Boden; Ryan Fleck	
2019	Dumbo	Tim Burton	
2021	Cry Macho	Clint Eastwood	
2021	Eternals	Chloé Zhao	
2021	Silent Night	Camille Griffin	Additional photography
2021	The King's Man	Matthew Vaughn	
2022	The Banshees of Inisherin	Martin McDonagh	
2022	My Policeman	Michael Grandage	
2023	Wicked Little Letters	Thea Sharrock	
2024	Kraven the Hunter	J. C. Chandor	
2025	Heads of State	Ilya Naishuller	
2025	The Woman in Cabin 10	Simon Stone	
2026	Wild Horse Nine	Martin McDonagh	
2026	Jumanji: Open World †	Jake Kasdan	Post-production
2027	Untitled Ocean's Eleven prequel †	Bradley Cooper	Post-production
2027	Stuntnuts: The Movie †	Damien Walters	Post-production

=== Television ===
Year	Title	Director	Episode
2013	Masters of Sex	John Madden	"Pilot"

== Awards and nominations ==
Institution	Year	Category	Title	Result
British Academy Film Awards	2017	Best Cinematography	Three Billboards Outside Ebbing, Missouri	Nominated
Satellite Awards	2017	Best Cinematography	Three Billboards Outside Ebbing, Missouri	Nominated
Satellite Awards	2022	Best Cinematography	The Banshees of Inisherin	Nominated
San Diego Film Critics Society	2022	Best Cinematography	The Banshees of Inisherin	Nominated
San Francisco Bay Area Film Critics Circle	2022	Best Cinematography	The Banshees of Inisherin	Nominated
St. Louis Film Critics Association	2022	Best Cinematography	The Banshees of Inisherin	Won
