= Stuntnuts: The Movie =

Upcoming action film

- Directed by: Damien Walters
- Based on: Kick-Ass by: Mark Millar; John Romita Jr.
- Produced by: Matthew Vaughn; Cristiano Ronaldo; Damien Walters
- Starring: Greg Townley; Paul Lowe; Bobby Holland Hanton; Haruka Oshima; Chris Hemsworth; Sam Rockwell; John Cena; Benson Boone; Matt Damon; Cristiano Ronaldo
- Cinematography: Ben Davis
- Production companies: UR MARV; Zebbo Productions
- Countries: United Kingdom; United States
- Language: English

Stuntnuts: The Movie is an upcoming action film directed by Damien Walters, serving as the first of a new trilogy (and the third film installment overall) in the Kick-Ass franchise by Mark Millar and John Romita, Jr.

== Premise ==
The film "follows two gifted stunt performers who take jobs on a massive Hollywood blockbuster in a desperate bid to save their community gym. But as the production spirals spectacularly out of control, fueled by increasingly dangerous stunts and the dueling egos of its leading men, Thor star Chris Hemsworth and Oscar winner Sam Rockwell (playing hilariously heightened versions of themselves), saving the gym may prove to be the least of their problems."

== Cast ==
- Greg Townley
- Paul Lowe
- Bobby Holland Hanton
- Haruka Oshima
- Chris Hemsworth as Himself
- Sam Rockwell as Himself
- John Cena
- Benson Boone
- Matt Damon
- Cristiano Ronaldo

== Production ==
In January 2024, upon revealing the existence of an upcoming trilogy of new Kick-Ass films and the secretly-filmed third installment titled Stuntnuts Does School Fight, Matthew Vaughn also announced that the next projects would be developed under the working-titles of Vram, and another also tentatively entitled Kick-Ass. Vaughn stated in February of the same year, that though he has been involved with the filmmaking process of the trilogy, he has intended to allow his second-unit team to serve as the primary filmmakers.

In February 2024, Vaughn revealed that Vram would be titled The Stuntman, and was currently in production, with Damien Walters directing. Principal photography began in October 2023 in Hampshire. Ben Davis serves as the cinematographer. In September 2024, the film had been retitled to Stuntnuts: The Movie, with Chris Hemsworth and Sam Rockwell joining the cast as themselves. Filming had wrapped by late 2024. By February 2026, John Cena and Benson Boone were revealed as part of the cast, with certain action scenes being filmed using Ray-Ban's Meta smart glasses.

== Release ==
The film screened at the American Film Market on November 9, 2026. The original aim was for the film to receive its world premiere at the 2024 Toronto International Film Festival or at the 2025 Sundance Film Festival.
