= Matthew Margeson =

American composer

Matthew Margeson is an American composer, musician, and arranger of film, television, and video game scores. He is a member of Hans Zimmer's Remote Control Productions, and has been a frequent collaborator of fellow composer Henry Jackman on films like Kick-Ass 2, Kingsman: The Secret Service, and its sequel Kingsman: The Golden Circle.

== Filmography ==
=== As main composer ===
Year	Title	Director	Notes
2010	Burning Palms	Christopher Landon	
2010	Skyline	Brothers Strause	
2011	Night of the Living Carrots	Robert Porter	Short film
2011	Transformers: Prime	Various	Animated television series 21 episodes with Brian Tyler
2011	Carnival Island	—	Video game
2012	PlayStation All-Stars Battle Royale	Manjit Jhita	Video game
2012	Puss in Boots: The Three Diablos	Raman Hui	Short film with Henry Jackman
2013	Knack	Mark Cerny	Video game with Wataru Hokoyama
2013	Kick-Ass 2	Jeff Wadlow	with Henry Jackman
2014	Kingsman: The Secret Service	Matthew Vaughn	with Henry Jackman
2015	Scouts Guide to the Zombie Apocalypse	Christopher B. Landon	
2015	Eddie the Eagle	Dexter Fletcher	
2016	Miss Peregrine's Home for Peculiar Children	Tim Burton	with Mike Higham
2016–17	Wrecked	Various	Television series 17 episodes
2017	Rings	F. Javier Gutiérrez	Replaced Benjamin Wallfisch
2017	Kingsman: The Golden Circle	Matthew Vaughn	with Henry Jackman
2018	Truth or Dare	Jeff Wadlow	
2019	Rocketman	Dexter Fletcher	
2019	Buffaloed	Tanya Wexler	
2020	A Babysitter's Guide to Monster Hunting	Rachel Talalay	
2021	The King's Man	Matthew Vaughn	with Dominic Lewis
2022	Alice's Wonderland Bakery	Nathan Chew	Animated television series
2022	Lyle, Lyle, Crocodile	Will Speck; Josh Gordon	
2023–25	Star Wars: Young Jedi Adventures	Elliot M. Bour	Animated television series
2025	Iron Man and His Awesome Friends	Michael Dowding	Animated television series

=== As other ===
Year	Title	Director	Composer(s)	Notes
2004	Catwoman	Pitof	Klaus Badelt	Assistant
2004	Dark Kingdom: The Dragon King	Uli Edel	Klaus Badelt	Assistant
2005	Constantine	Francis Lawrence	Klaus Badelt; Brian Tyler	Assistant
2006	Ultraviolet	Kurt Wimmer	Klaus Badelt	Synth programmer
2006	First Flight	Cameron Hood; Kyle Jefferson	James Dooley	Assistant
2008	Bachelor Party 2: The Last Temptation	James Ryan	James Dooley	Technical score advisor
2008	Made of Honor	Paul Weiland	Rupert Gregson-Williams	Additional music composer
2008	You Don't Mess with the Zohan	Dennis Dugan	Rupert Gregson-Williams	Additional music composer
2008	The Little Mermaid: Ariel's Beginning	Peggy Holmes	James Dooley	Additional music arranger
2008	Beverly Hills Chihuahua	Raja Gosnell	Heitor Pereira	Score synth programmer
2009	Thick as Thieves	Mimi Leder	Atli Örvarsson	Additional music arranger Music programmer
2009	Monsters vs. Aliens	Rob Letterman; Conrad Vernon	Henry Jackman	Additional music arranger
2009	Dragonball Evolution	James Wong	Brian Tyler	Additional music arranger
2009	I Hate Valentine's Day	Nia Vardalos	Keith Power	Additional music arranger
2009	Angels & Demons	Ron Howard	Hans Zimmer	Synth programmer
2009	Transformers: Revenge of the Fallen	Michael Bay	Steve Jablonsky	Additional music composer
2009	Monsters vs. Aliens: Mutant Pumpkins from Outer Space	Peter Ramsey	Henry Jackman	Additional music arranger
2010	Henri 4	Jo Baier	Henry Jackman & Hans Zimmer	Additional music arranger
2010	How to Train Your Dragon	Dean DeBlois; Chris Sanders	John Powell	Assistant
2010	Kick-Ass	Matthew Vaughn	John Murphy; Ilan Eshkeri; Henry Jackman; Marius de Vries	Additional music arranger
2010	Prince of Persia: The Sands of Time	Mike Newell	Harry Gregson-Williams	Additional music arranger
2010	The Expendables	Sylvester Stallone	Brian Tyler	Additional music arranger
2011	Season of the Witch	Dominic Sena	Atli Örvarsson	Additional music arranger
2011	Battle: Los Angeles	Jonathan Liebesman	Brian Tyler	Additional music arranger
2011	Pirates of the Caribbean: On Stranger Tides	Rob Marshall	Hans Zimmer	Additional music composer
2011	X-Men: First Class	Matthew Vaughn	Henry Jackman	Additional music composer
2011	Puss in Boots	Chris Miller	Henry Jackman	Additional music composer
2011	Sherlock Holmes: A Game of Shadows	Guy Ritchie	Hans Zimmer	Additional music arranger
2012	Man on a Ledge	Asger Leth	Henry Jackman	Additional music composer
2012	Abraham Lincoln: Vampire Hunter	Timur Bekmambetov	Henry Jackman	Additional music composer
2012	Wreck-It Ralph	Rich Moore	Henry Jackman	Additional music arranger
2013	Gangster Squad	Ruben Fleischer	Steve Jablonsky	Score programmer
2013	G.I. Joe: Retaliation	Jon M. Chu	Henry Jackman	Additional music composer
2013	This Is the End	Seth Rogen; Evan Goldberg	Henry Jackman	Additional music composer
2013	Captain Phillips	Paul Greengrass	Henry Jackman	Additional music composer
2014	Captain America: The Winter Soldier	Russo brothers	Henry Jackman	Additional music composer
2014	How to Train Your Dragon 2	Dean DeBlois	John Powell	Assistant
2015	Pan	Joe Wright	John Powell	Score producer
2018	The Predator	Shane Black	Henry Jackman	Additional music composer
