= The King's Man =

2021 film by Matthew Vaughn

- Theatrical release poster.
- Directed by: Matthew Vaughn
- Screenplay by: Matthew Vaughn; Karl Gajdusek
- Story by: Matthew Vaughn
- Based on: Kingsman by: Mark Millar; Dave Gibbons
- Produced by: Matthew Vaughn; David Reid; Adam Bohling
- Starring: Ralph Fiennes; Gemma Arterton; Rhys Ifans; Matthew Goode; Tom Hollander; Harris Dickinson; Daniel Brühl; Djimon Hounsou; Charles Dance
- Cinematography: Ben Davis
- Edited by: Jason Ballantine; Rob Hall
- Music by: Matthew Margeson; Dominic Lewis
- Production companies: Marv Studios; Cloudy Productions
- Distributed by: 20th Century Studios
- Release dates: 6 December 2021 (London); 26 December 2021 (United Kingdom)
- Running time: 131 minutes
- Country: United Kingdom
- Language: English
- Budget: $95–100 million
- Box office: $126 million

The King's Man is a 2021 spy film directed by Matthew Vaughn from a screenplay by Vaughn and Karl Gajdusek. Based on the Kingsman (Note: After the release of film adaptation of The Secret Service, the comic series was retitled as Kingsman.) comic series, it is a prequel to Kingsman: The Secret Service (2014) and Kingsman: The Golden Circle (2017) and is the third installment in the Kingsman franchise. Its ensemble cast includes Ralph Fiennes, Gemma Arterton, Rhys Ifans, Matthew Goode, Tom Hollander, Harris Dickinson, Daniel Brühl, Djimon Hounsou, and Charles Dance. In the film, Orlando Oxford (Fiennes) sets up Kingsman, a secret spy organisation, to combat a shadow network escalating political violence across the world during the early 20th century.

Development on a third Kingsman film was confirmed in June 2018, with Vaughn announcing initial plans for a prequel and sequel film to be produced back-to-back. That September, Fiennes and Dickinson were confirmed to star, with most of the main cast rounded out two months later; other cast members joined between February and May 2019. Principal photography began in January 2019 and lasted until that May, with filming taking place across the United Kingdom and Italy. The film's music and soundtrack was composed by Matthew Margeson, replacing Henry Jackman.

The King's Man was originally scheduled for release by 20th Century Studios on 8 November 2019, but was delayed several times due to the COVID-19 pandemic. It was theatrically released in the United States on 22 December 2021, and in the United Kingdom four days later. It received mixed reviews from critics, with praise for Fiennes' performance but criticism for being derivative. The King's Man grossed $126 million against an estimated production budget of $95–100 million budget, making it a box-office bomb. A standalone spin-off, Argylle, was released in 2024.

== Plot ==
In 1902, nearing the end of the Second Boer War, British aristocrat Orlando, Duke of Oxford, his wife Emily, and their young son Conrad visit a British concentration camp in South Africa while working for the British Red Cross. A sniper attack on the camp mortally wounds Emily; before dying, she makes Orlando promise never to let their son see war again.

Twelve years later, Orlando has formed a private spy network with his servants, butler Shola and maid Polly Wilkins, employed by the world's most powerful dignitaries. Conrad is eager to fight, but Orlando forbids him to join the British Army and persuades Secretary of State for War Lord Kitchener not to let him do so. At Kitchener's request, Conrad and Orlando ride with Orlando's friends, Archduke Franz Ferdinand of Austria, and his wife Sophie, Duchess of Hohenberg, through Sarajevo. Conrad saves the Archduke from a bomb thrown by Gavrilo Princip, a Bosnian Serb intent on sparking a war. Princip later reencounters the Archduke's entourage by chance and fatally shoots him and his wife, starting World War I.

Orlando learns that the assassination was orchestrated by "The Flock": a group plotting to pit the German, Russian, and British empires against each other, led by the mysterious "Shepherd", whose ultimate goal is Scottish independence; his operatives include Russian mystic Grigori Rasputin, trusted adviser to Tsar Nicholas of Russia. Rasputin poisons Nicholas's young son Alexei, only to cure him after Nicholas promises to pull out of the war. Conrad is notified of Rasputin's manipulation by his cousin, Prince Felix Yusupov. Knowing the Western Front will be left vulnerable if Russia exits the war, Conrad delivers this information to Kitchener and his aide-de-camp Major Max Morton, who sets sail for Russia. Their ship, HMS Hampshire, is torpedoed by a submarine and sunk. Word of Kitchener's death reaches Orlando, spurring him to travel to Russia with Shola, Polly, and Conrad to kill Rasputin. After a gruelling fight, the four kill Rasputin at a Christmas party hosted by Prince Felix.

To keep the United States from entering the war, Erik Jan Hanussen, an adviser to Kaiser Wilhelm II, sends the Zimmermann Telegram, encouraging Mexico to invade the United States. Although British Intelligence intercepts the message, Polly deciphers it, but American President Woodrow Wilson refuses to join the war, citing a lack of concrete proof. The Shepherd recruits Vladimir Lenin to overthrow the Tsar and remove Russia from the war, sending an assassin to execute the Romanov family. Conrad is commissioned into the Grenadier Guards against his father's wishes. King George V arranges to have him assigned to London. Determined to fight in the war, Conrad swaps places with Scottish soldier Archie Reid, giving him the nickname "Lancelot" to send his father a message. Disguised as Archie, a member of the Black Watch, Conrad volunteers for a mission into no man's land to retrieve information from a wounded British agent. Upon his return, a fellow soldier who knows Archie accuses him of being a German spy and shoots him dead, devastating Orlando. The information he recovered verifies the authenticity of the Zimmermann Telegram.

After Wilson again refuses to enter the war despite Conrad's proof, Orlando learns that the President is being blackmailed with footage of him being seduced by Shepherd's agent, Mata Hari, and resolves to recover the negatives. Upon defeating Mata Hari at the American embassy, Orlando identifies her cashmere scarf and locates its origin. Orlando parachutes onto the mountaintop sanctuary of the Shepherd, who is revealed to be Morton. Morton had arranged Kitchener's assassination and faked his own death. Orlando fights and kills him with Shola's help. Polly recovers the film, which is delivered to Wilson. He then burns it and brings the United States into the war.

Following the war, Orlando purchases the Kingsman Tailor Shop as a front for his organization. Orlando, Shola, Polly, King George V, Archie, and the US Ambassador to the UK form the original Kingsman agency, each being assigned a codename from the King Arthur legend to honour Conrad.

In a mid-credit scene, Hanussen, having assumed command of Shepherd's organization, introduces Lenin to the Romanovs' assassin, Adolf Hitler.

== Cast ==
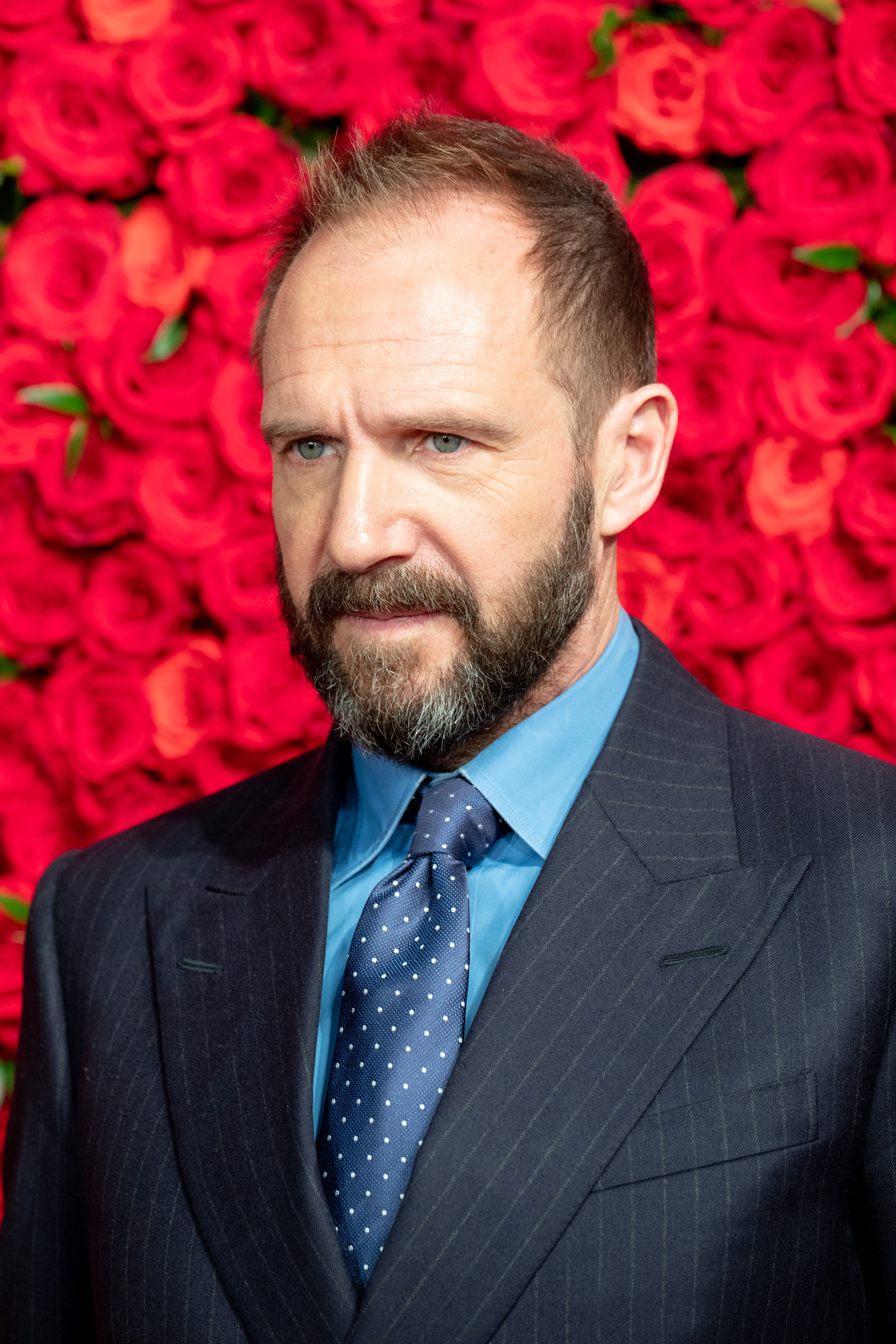
Ralph Fiennes stars as Orlando Oxford.

- Ralph Fiennes as Orlando Oxford: An aristocrat, spy network leader and founding Kingsman Arthur.
- Gemma Arterton as Polly Wilkins: A maid, member of Orlando's spy network and founding Kingsman Galahad.
- Rhys Ifans as Grigori Rasputin: The Tsar's personal physician and also agent and second-in-command of the Shepherd.
- Matthew Goode as Max Morton / The Shepherd: Posing as an English officer in the British Army, in reality a Scotsman seeking Scottish independence, the leader of a plot to pit the German, Russian, and British empires against each other. The character is based on Frederick Duquesne.
- Tom Hollander as
  - King George and founding Kingsman Percival,
  - Kaiser Wilhelm and
  - Tsar Nicholas (both cousins of George V).
- Harris Dickinson as Conrad Oxford: Orlando's son, who switches places with a soldier Archie Reid to fight in the Great War against his father's wishes.
- Daniel Brühl as Erik Jan Hanussen: An occultist and the Shepherd's third-in-command.
- Djimon Hounsou as Shola: A butler, member of Orlando's spy network and founding Kingsman Merlin.
- Charles Dance as Herbert Kitchener: The British Secretary of State for War.
- Valerie Pachner as Mata Hari: An agent of the Shepherd and seducer of Woodrow Wilson.
- Alison Steadman as Rita, a maid and member of Orlando's spy network.
- Todd Boyce as Alfred DuPont, american industrialist and member of The Flock.
- August Diehl as Vladimir Lenin: A Russian revolutionary and the head of government in Soviet Russia.
- David Kross as Moustached Man (Adolf Hitler): An assassin recruited by Hanussen.
- Alexandra Maria Lara as Emily Oxford: Orlando's deceased wife and Conrad's mother.
- Branka Katić as Tsarina Alix: The Russian empress consort.
- Robert Aramayo as Sergeant Major Atkins
- Ron Cook as Archduke Franz Ferdinand of Austria
- Olivier Richters as Huge Machinery Shack Guard

In addition, Aaron Taylor-Johnson portrays Archie Reid, a soldier and founding Kingsman Lancelot, whilst Stanley Tucci appears as the US Ambassador to the UK and founding Kingsman Bedivere.

== Production ==
=== Development ===
In June 2018, Matthew Vaughn announced that a prequel film titled Kingsman: The Great Game was in active development, stating that the plot would take place during the early 1900s and would depict the formation of the spy agency and that the project would film back-to-back with "the third regular Kingsman film" which was scheduled to be released in 2021. Vaughn was inspired to write the script for the prequel film after watching The Man Who Would Be King.

=== Casting ===
In September 2018, it was announced that Ralph Fiennes and Harris Dickinson would star in the prequel with the former also serving as one of the executive producers of the film. In November 2018, it was revealed that Daniel Brühl, Charles Dance, Rhys Ifans and Matthew Goode would co-star in the film.

In February 2019, it was reported that Aaron Taylor-Johnson, Gemma Arterton, Tom Hollander, Djimon Hounsou, Alison Steadman, Stanley Tucci, Robert Aramayo and Neil Jackson had joined the cast. In April 2019, it was announced Alexandra Maria Lara had joined the cast of the film. Later in May, Joel Basman joined the cast. That same month, as filming concluded, Vaughn denied reports that Liam Neeson had joined the cast. Vaughn also said The Great Game was a working title and the film would not have that name.

=== Filming ===
Principal photography began 22 January 2019 in the United Kingdom. In April 2019, some scenes were shot in Piedmont, Italy: Turin, Po river's street, street of city and in two palaces close to it; Venaria Reale: the Palace of Venaria and royal gardens; Nichelino, Palazzina di caccia of Stupinigi and surroundings; Racconigi (Cuneo), Castle of Racconigi. The film's initial cinematographer Ben Davis had to depart the project during reshoots due to his commitments to Eternals.

Vaughn admitted some scenes had to be cut from the film because they were "way too Kingsman-y.", and that this film needed to find a balance between the fun tone of the other Kingsman movies and respect for historical accuracy and the characters. He revealed that he had originally written three scenes featuring Rasputin that would have been so explicit that they likely would have received an NC-17 rating.

== Soundtrack ==
Matthew Margeson, who worked with Henry Jackman in the previous Kingsman films, composed the film score with Dominic Lewis. Hollywood Records released the soundtrack digitally on 22 December 2021. The ending theme is "Measure of a Man" by FKA Twigs featuring Central Cee.

== Release ==
The King's Man had its world premiere in London, United Kingdom on 6 December 2021 and was theatrically released on 22 December 2021, its eighth proposed release date and more than two years after it was originally due to come out.

It was originally scheduled to be released on 8 November 2019, but was pushed back first to 15 November 2019, then to 14 February 2020, and then to 18 September 2020. The release date was again pushed back by Walt Disney Studios Motion Pictures to 26 February 2021, due to the COVID-19 pandemic. Following the delay of Marvel Cinematic Universe: Phase Four films, The King's Man was moved up two weeks to 12 February 2021, before being moved again to 12 March 2021. In January 2021, the release date was delayed again to 20 August 2021. In March 2021, it was further delayed to the December 2021 date. The film played in cinemas for 45 days before heading to digital platforms.

=== Home media ===
The film started streaming on Disney+ through Star in the UK, Ireland, Japan, and South Korea on 9 February 2022 and later that February for Australia and New Zealand and Canada. It streamed on HBO Max and Hulu on 18 February and on Star+ on 2 March. The film streamed on Disney+ Hotstar on 23 February 2022 in Southeast Asia. The film was released on Blu-ray, DVD, and 4K Ultra HD by 20th Century Studios Home Entertainment on 22 February.

== Reception ==
=== Box office ===
The King's Man grossed $37.2 million in the US and Canada, and $88.8 million in other territories, for a worldwide total $126 million.

In the US and Canada, The King's Man was released alongside Sing 2 and The Matrix Resurrections. It was originally projected to gross $15–20 million from 3,175 screens over its first five days of release. It went on to under-perform, grossing $5.9 million in its opening weekend and an estimated $10 million over the five days, finishing fifth at the box office, with contributing factors such as the reluctance to go to cinemas during the pandemic, the rise of the Omicron variant of COVID and being released during the second weekend of Spider-Man: No Way Home. Men made up 65% of the audience during its opening, with those in the age range of 18–34 comprising 54% of ticket sales and those above 35 comprising 40%. The film earned $4.6 million in its second weekend, $3.2 million in its third, $2.2 million in its fourth, $1.8 million in its fifth, $1.66 million in its sixth, $1.2 million in its seventh, and $426,262 in its eighth.

Outside the US and Canada, the film earned $6.9 million in its opening weekend, including $3.5 million in South Korea, $2.1 million in Japan, and $600,000 in Indonesia. In its second weekend, the film made $14.1 million from 22 markets. In Taiwan, the film opened with $2.8 million, making it the fourth-best opening of 2021 in the country. In its third weekend, the film earned $13.4 million, including $1.6 million from Germany, where it debuted in second place at the box office. The film made $10.2 million in its fourth weekend, $6.2 million in its fifth, $4.2 million in its sixth, and $2.7 million in its seventh.

=== Critical response ===
The review aggregator website Rotten Tomatoes reported an approval rating of 41% based on 181 reviews, with an average rating of 5.1/10. The site's critical consensus reads, "Ralph Fiennes' solid central performance in The King's Man is done dirty by this tonally confused prequel's descent into action thriller tedium." On Metacritic, which uses a weighted average, the film has a score of 44 out of 100, based on 40 critics, indicating "mixed or average reviews". Audiences polled by CinemaScore gave the film an average grade of "B+" on an A+ to F scale, while PostTrak reported 77% of audience members gave it a positive score, with 60% saying they would definitely recommend it.

=== Viewership ===
2.2 million US households watched The King's Man during its first four days available for streaming, making it the most watched film across all platforms in the United States during the week of February 20, 2022.

== Sequel ==
In December 2021, Matthew Vaughn stated that if a sequel were to be developed, he would like to see the story about the first decade of the Kingsman agency with all of the characters that the audience sees at the end. In October 2023, Vaughn announced a direct sequel, The King's Man: The Traitor King, to be in active development, following the fictionalised rise of Adolf Hitler (portrayed by David Kross) across the franchise's alternate history setting, with Ralph Fiennes, Aaron Taylor-Johnson, Gemma Arterton, and Djimon Hounsou intended to reprise their roles. Despite this, in October 2024, during an interview with The Hollywood Reporter, 20th Century Studios executive Steve Asbell revealed that the studio has no plans for any Kingsman sequels or prequels.
