= George Richmond (cinematographer) =

British cinematographer

- Occupation: Cinematographer
- Years active: 1990–present
- Organization: British Society of Cinematographers
- Father: Anthony B. Richmond
- Website: http://www.georgerichmond.com

George Richmond BSC is a British cinematographer known mostly for action films.

== Career ==
Richmond began as a camera operator. He worked on several films as a second assistant cameraman before making his debut as a cinematographer with The Hide.

== Filmography ==
Film

| Year | Title | Director | Ref. |
|---|---|---|---|
| 2008 | The Hide | Marek Losey | |
| 2009 | Ghost Machine | Chris Hartwill | |
| 2011 | A Thousand Kisses Deep | Dana Lustig | |
| 2011 | Wild Bill | Dexter Fletcher | |
| 2012 | Blood | Nick Murphy | |
| 2013 | Sunshine on Leith | Dexter Fletcher | |
| 2014 | Kingsman: The Secret Service | Matthew Vaughn | |
| 2015 | Eddie the Eagle | Dexter Fletcher | |
| 2017 | Unlocked | Michael Apted | |
| 2017 | Kingsman: The Golden Circle | Matthew Vaughn | |
| 2018 | Tomb Raider | Roar Uthaug | |
| 2019 | Rocketman | Dexter Fletcher | |
| 2021 | Free Guy | Shawn Levy | |
| 2022 | Fantastic Beasts: The Secrets of Dumbledore | David Yates | |
| 2023 | Pain Hustlers | David Yates | |
| 2024 | Argylle | Matthew Vaughn | |
| 2024 | Deadpool & Wolverine | Shawn Levy | |
| 2025 | Now You See Me: Now You Don't | Ruben Fleischer | |

Television

| Year | Title | Director | Notes |
|---|---|---|---|
| 2011 | One Man Walking | Margaret Williams | TV movie |
| 2013 | Playhouse Presents | Idris Elba | Episode "Pavement Psychologist" |
| 2013 | The Great Train Robbery | Julian Jarrold | Episode "A Robber's Tale" |
