= Stuntnuts Does School Fight =

Upcoming black comedy film directed by Damien Walters

- Directed by: Damien Walters
- Written by: Damien Walters
- Based on: Kick-Ass by: Mark Millar; John Romita Jr.
- Produced by: Matthew Vaughn; Luke Gomes; Joby Stephens (Note: Also assistant director.); Christopher Tomkins
- Starring: Greg Townley; Paul Lowe; Bobby Holland Hanton
- Cinematography: Nathan Claridge
- Edited by: Ryan Axe; Ben Mills
- Music by: Steve Davis
- Production companies: Marv Studios; Zebbo Productions
- Countries: United Kingdom; United States
- Language: English

Stuntnuts Does School Fight is an upcoming comedy film written and directed by Damien Walters and produced by Matthew Vaughn. It serves as a standalone sequel to Stuntnuts: The Movie as the second film in a new trilogy, and fourth movie installment overall in the Kick-Ass film series. Vaughn described the project as tonally "The Inbetweeners with stunt-men". It stars Greg Townley, Paul Lowe and Bobby Holland Hanton.

== Cast ==
- Greg Townley
- Paul Lowe
- Bobby Holland Hanton

== Production ==
In April 2019, principal photography had begun on a new comedy action film titled School Fight, written and directed by Damien Walters, with Greg Townley, Paul Lowe and Bobby Holland Hanton starring in the lead roles, noted as the first feature film to be filmed with the Apple Pro Res RAW by Atomos and Apple. In January 2024, the project was announced by producer Matthew Vaughn to be a sequel to Stuntnuts: The Movie and the second installment of a new trilogy in the Kick-Ass franchise. In September 2024, the film had been retitled to Stuntnuts Does School Fight.

Filming had wrapped by June 2021.

== Future ==
In September 2024, a sequel, titled Stuntnuts Does Shiver, "described as Jaws meets Groundhog Day", was announced to be in development with John Cena and Benson Boone joining the cast.
