= Damien Walters =

British stunt performer

- Born: Damien Gareth Walters; 6 April 1982 (age 43); Derbyshire, England
- Occupations: Gymnast, stunt man
- Height: 1.80 m (5 ft 11 in)

Damien Gareth Walters (born 6 April 1982) is a British freerunner and former gymnast from Derbyshire who specializes in tumbling and trampoline. In January 2024, he was announced as the director of an already-filmed comedy action film Stuntnuts Does School Fight which would later feature the same stunt crew in an upcoming Hit-Girl & Kick-Ass reboot.

== Career ==
Walters participated in four Trampoline World Championships. In 2003, he was one of four members of the British team winning the World Title in the team competition. In the years 2001 and 2007, he ranked 4th with the team. He also finished 5th in singles competition in 2003 and 2005.

Since 2007, Walters has not participated in further tournaments and has focused on his other projects, mainly his career as a stuntman. He also appeared in a number of television commercials and has performed in acrobatic shows.

Walters has had the role of stunt double or stunt performer in the films: Hellboy II: The Golden Army, Ninja Assassin, Scott Pilgrim vs. the World, The Eagle, I Am Number Four, Blitz, Colombiana, Sherlock Holmes: A Game of Shadows, and Captain America: The First Avenger. In Kick-Ass, he was credited as both a stunt double and assistant fight coordinator. He also appeared in the films 47 Ronin and Kingsman: The Secret Service.

In 2010, he won the Taurus World Stunt Awards for "Best Fight" in the film Ninja Assassin.

Walters also has a passion for Freerunning where he incorporates his gymnastic skills as well as his stuntman abilities. On YouTube, he is one of the most watched freerunners, with his videos having a total of over 130 million views, leading him to open his own gym, Derby City Gymnastics Club in Derby, where he would shoot short/feature films.

In January 2024, Matthew Vaughn announced that two films directed by Walters will be produced, Stuntnuts: The Movie and Stuntnuts Does School Fight.

== Filmography ==
Stuntwork

- Hellboy II: The Golden Army (2008)
- Ninja Assassin (2009)
- Kick-Ass (2010)
- Scott Pilgrim vs. The World (2010)
- The Eagle (2011)
- I Am Number Four (2011)
- Blitz (2011)
- Captain America: The First Avenger (2011)
- Sherlock Holmes: A Game of Shadows (2011)
- Skyfall (2012)
- 47 Ronin (2013)
- Kingsman: The Secret Service (2015)
- Assassin's Creed (2016)
- Asura (2018)

Director

- Stuntnuts: The Movie (TBA)
- Stuntnuts Does School Fight (TBA)

== Bibliography ==
- Staff (3 September 2005), "Damien tumbles to glory", Derby Evening Telegraph, p. 37, Factiva DEBTEL0020050904e19300019
- Hill, Ed (14 April 2009), "City gymnast tumbles into career as movie stuntman", Derby Evening Telegraph, p. 3, Factiva DEBTEL0020090415e54e0002p, archived from the original on 19 October 2011
- Hill, Ed (18 December 2009), "Damien tumbles on to big hit", Derby Evening Telegraph, p. 13, Factiva DEBTEL0020091219e5ci0001v, archived from the original on 1 October 2012
- Hill, Ed (5 January 2011), "Will Smith tells city stuntman 'make my son flipping good'", Derby Evening Telegraph, p. 3, Factiva DEBTEL0020110105e7150001s, archived from the original on 1 October 2012
