= Sophie Cookson =

English actress (born 1990)

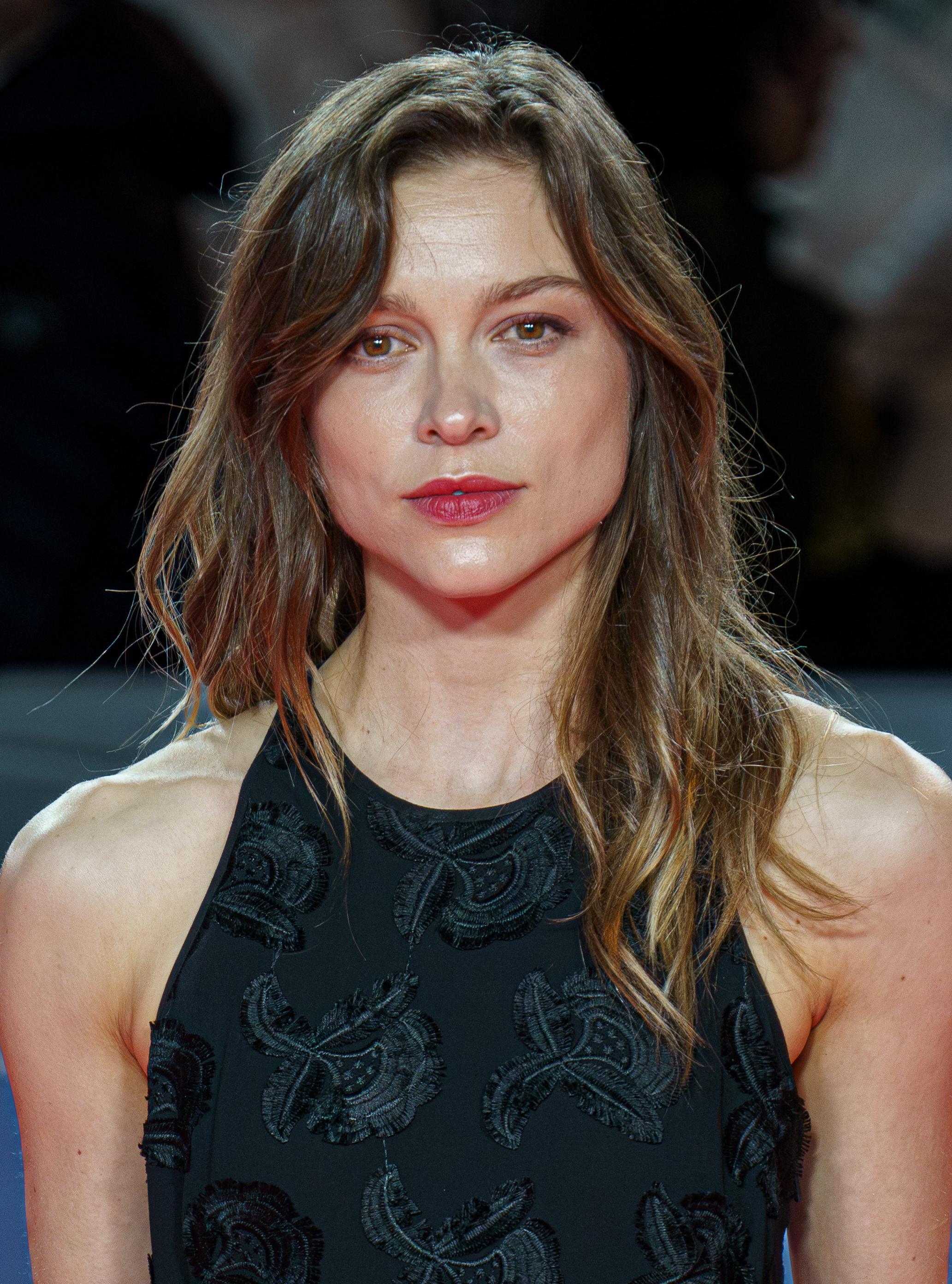
- Cookson in 2025
- Born: 15 May 1990 (age 36)
- Education: Oxford School of Drama
- Occupation: Actress
- Years active: 2013–present
- Partner: Stephen Campbell Moore (2018–present)
- Children: 1

Sophie Cookson (born 15 May 1990) is an English actress. She played secret agent Roxy Morton / Lancelot in the 2014 spy film Kingsman: The Secret Service and its 2017 sequel Kingsman: The Golden Circle, and Pippa in the 2016 fantasy film The Huntsman: Winter's War. She played the title role of Christine Keeler in the 2019 BBC One drama television series The Trial of Christine Keeler.

== Early life ==
Cookson was brought up in Sussex and later Suffolk, where she attended Woodbridge School. She was involved in singing and musical theatre since childhood. After being part of a theatre company that had toured Japan, she quit acting to study art history and Arabic at the University of Edinburgh. However, she soon dropped out to pursue an acting career and attended the Oxford School of Drama for three years, and graduated in 2013.

== Career ==
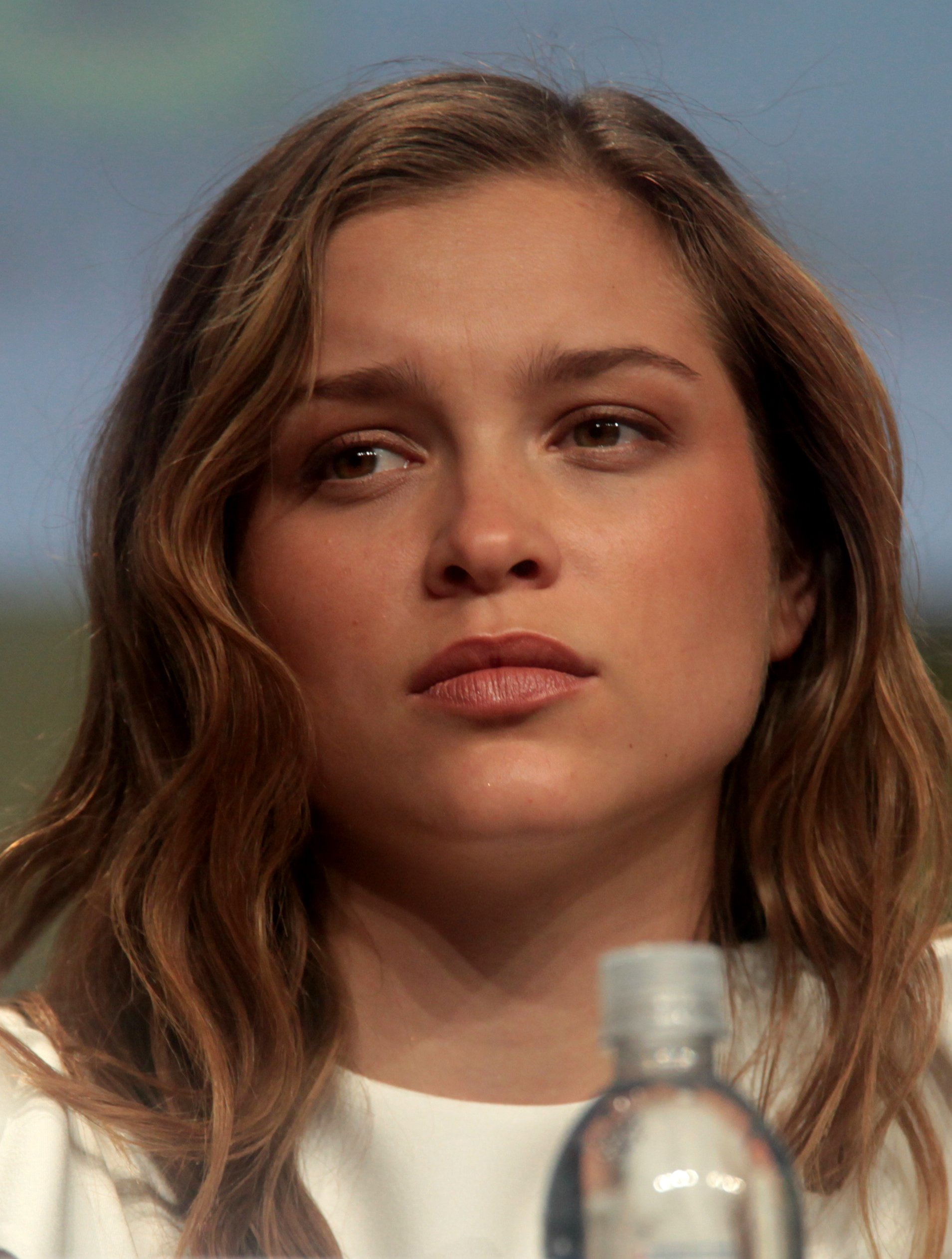
Cookson at San Diego Comic Con in 2014

While still attending Oxford Drama School in her senior year, she was cast as Grace Mohune in the Sky 1 miniseries Moonfleet, based on the J. Meade Falkner novel of the same name. In early 2014, she appeared in the film adaption of the Rosamunde Pilcher novel Unknown Heart, produced by German television network ZDF, portraying Millie Lancaster. The same year, she also landed her first big screen role, replacing Emma Watson for the part of secret agent Roxanne "Roxy" Morton / Lancelot in the spy film Kingsman: The Secret Service, based on the comic book The Secret Service by Mark Millar and Dave Gibbons. Also in 2014, Cookson was cast in the female main role in Lee Tamahori's action epic Emperor, about a young woman seeking revenge for the execution of her father by Holy Roman Emperor Charles V, opposite Adrien Brody as the titular Emperor. The movie was finished and screened at Cannes in 2017 but its release has been held up by legal challenges.

In 2016, she appeared in the film The Huntsman: Winter's War in a minor role as the female huntsman Pippa. Beginning in June 2017, she appeared in the Netflix series Gypsy as troubled singer Sidney Pierce. However, the series was cancelled in August after one season due to negative reviews and low ratings, even though the second season had already been in development. In July, she appeared in the horror film The Crucifixion, playing a journalist investigating a lethal exorcism performed on a nun, and in September of the same year, she reprised her role as Roxy Morton in the sequel to The Secret Service, The Golden Circle, while also appearing in a musical short for the song '"Pleader'" by British indie rock group alt-J.

In 2018, she played Dottie in the Trafalgar Studios production of the play Killer Joe, alongside Orlando Bloom.

== Personal life ==
In 2017, she met actor Stephen Campbell Moore on the set of Red Joan. Cookson and Moore reportedly began dating in November 2018. They have one daughter together, born in 2020.

== Filmography ==
=== Film ===
List of film performances
Year	Title	Role	Notes
2014	Kingsman: The Secret Service	Roxanne "Roxy" Morton / Lancelot	
2016	The Huntsman: Winter's War	Pippa	
2017	The Crucifixion	Nicole Rawlins	
2017	Kingsman: The Golden Circle	Roxanne "Roxy" Morton / Lancelot	
2018	Red Joan	Young Joan Smith	
2018	Ashes in the Snow	Ona	
2019	Greed	Lily McCreadie	
2021	Infinite	Nora Brightman	
2024	Stockholm Bloodbath	Anne Eriksson	
2024	This Time Next Year	Minnie	

=== Television ===
List of television performances
Year	Title	Role	Notes
2013	Moonfleet	Grace Mohune	Miniseries
2014	Unknown Heart	Millie Lancaster	Television film
2017	Gypsy	Sidney Pierce	Main role
2019–2020	The Trial of Christine Keeler	Christine Keeler	Main role
2022	The Confessions of Frannie Langton	Madame Marguerite Benham	Miniseries

== Awards and nominations ==
List of awards won and nominations
Year	Award	Category	Nominated work	Result
2015	Empire Awards	Best Female Newcomer	Kingsman: The Secret Service	Nominated
2020	Newport Beach Film Festival	Festival Honors Award - Breakthrough	Greed	Won
2022	Golden Raspberry Awards	Worst Supporting Actress	Infinite	Nominated
