= Argylle =

2024 film by Matthew Vaughn

- Theatrical release poster
- Directed by: Matthew Vaughn
- Written by: Jason Fuchs
- Produced by: Matthew Vaughn; Adam Bohling; David Reid; Jason Fuchs
- Starring: Henry Cavill; Bryce Dallas Howard; Sam Rockwell; Bryan Cranston; Catherine O'Hara; Dua Lipa; Ariana DeBose; John Cena; Samuel L. Jackson
- Cinematography: George Richmond
- Edited by: Lee Smith; Tom Harrison-Read; Col Goudie
- Music by: Lorne Balfe
- Production companies: Apple Studios; Marv Studios; Cloudy Productions
- Distributed by: Universal Pictures; Apple Original Films (Note: Split distribution between Universal Pictures and Apple TV+; Universal only handled the theatrical and VOD release, while Apple exclusively handles the SVOD release.)
- Release dates: 24 January 2024 (Odeon Luxe Leicester Square); 1 February 2024 (United Kingdom); 2 February 2024 (United States)
- Running time: 139 minutes
- Countries: United Kingdom; United States
- Language: English
- Box office: $96.2 million

Argylle (/ɑːrˈɡaɪl/ ar-GHYLE) is a 2024 action-comedy film directed by Matthew Vaughn from a screenplay by Jason Fuchs. It is a standalone spin-off of the Kingsman franchise. Its ensemble cast includes Henry Cavill, Bryce Dallas Howard, Sam Rockwell, Bryan Cranston, Catherine O'Hara, Dua Lipa, Ariana DeBose, John Cena, and Samuel L. Jackson. In the film, reclusive author Elly Conway (Howard) becomes embroiled in espionage after a novel she is writing inadvertently mirrors the activity of an underground crime syndicate.

Argylle was announced in June 2021, with Vaughn attached to direct and produce; Vaughn developed most of the film during the COVID-19 pandemic. The cast, as well as Fuchs' involvement, was announced one month later, and in August it was reported that the film's worldwide streaming distribution rights were acquired by Apple TV+. Principal photography began that same month and concluded that December, with filming taking place in London, Greece and the United States.

Argylle premiered at Odeon Luxe Leicester Square in London on 24 January 2024, and was first theatrically released in the United Kingdom on 1 February 2024, and in the United States one day later, by Universal Pictures. It debuted on AppleTV+ on 12 April. Argylle received mostly negative reviews from critics, with criticism for its plot and runtime, and grossed $96.2 million. In 2024, Vaughn announced plans to develop a prequel, as well as a shared universe crossover film between Argylle and Kingsman.

== Plot ==
Elly Conway, an introverted spy novelist, has almost finished her fifth book about Aubrey Argylle, the eponymous character of the Argylle series, but suffers from writer's block after feedback from her mother, Ruth. On a train journey to visit Ruth and her father, Barry, Elly is saved from an ambush by an actual spy, Aidan Wilde, who explains that a devious organisation known as the Division has targeted her because her novels seemingly predict their future. Aidan travels with Elly to England, hoping her next chapter will reveal how to stop the Division.

In London, the duo searches for a "Masterkey" (Note: The device is known as the "Masterkey" or the "Masterfile" in different versions of the film. This article uses "Masterkey".) that would help expose the Division referenced in Elly's novels. Suspecting Aidan wants to kill her, too, Elly calls her parents for help. As they arrive, Aidan reveals that her parents are operatives of the Division, forcing him and Elly to fend them off before fleeing. Escaping to France, Aidan and former CIA deputy director Alfred "Alfie" Solomon reveal that Argylle is not entirely fictional: Elly is, in fact, agent Rachel Kylle ("Argylle" seemingly having been derived from "R. Kylle"), who was captured and brainwashed by the Division five years earlier and made to believe that Dr. Margaret Vogeler (Ruth) and Director Ritter (Barry) were her parents. Elly put her suppressed memories, in modified form, into her novels; Aidan resurfaces as one of her characters, Wyatt, while Alfie reappears as her cat. With the latest Argylle novel, Rachel was about to reveal the whereabouts of the Masterkey to the world.

Aidan and Rachel travel to the Arabian Peninsula where they retrieve the Masterkey but are cornered by the Division, who return them to their base. Ritter reveals that Rachel was, in fact, a double agent and one of their most loyal assets for the Division, after which she offers to interrogate and subsequently shoots Aidan. She also locates Alfie for them but reveals that she sent him the Masterkey, betraying the Division. Aidan, revealed to have been shot in non-lethal areas, reunites with Rachel, and the two fight their way through the facility. Ritter interrupts the transmission of the Masterkey to Alfie but is fatally shot after Rachel's cat scratches out his eyes.

Aidan and Rachel escape to the Division facility exterior, revealed to be an oil tanker, to use the satellite connection to send the Masterkey. Dr Vogeler uses a mental trigger code to force Rachel to attack Aidan until Vogeler is killed by Keira, an ally who accompanied Rachel and Aidan on the mission. Alfie finally receives the Masterkey transmission, and Aidan detonates the Division's oil tanker headquarters.

Resuming her novelist persona, Rachel publishes her final Argylle novel, where at a reading, the real Argylle reveals himself, much to her shock and confusion.

In a mid-credits scene, taking place twenty years earlier, a young Argylle is revealed to be a Kingsman agent, with the first novel being based on his life.

== Cast ==
- Bryce Dallas Howard as Elly Conway
- Sam Rockwell as Aidan Wilde
- Bryan Cranston as Director Ritter/"Barry"
- Catherine O'Hara as Dr. Margaret Vogeler/"Ruth"
- Henry Cavill as Argylle
  - Louis Partridge as young Argylle
- Sofia Boutella as Saba Al-Badr
- Dua Lipa as Lagrange
- Ariana DeBose as Keira
- John Cena as Wyatt
- Samuel L. Jackson as Alfie
- Richard E. Grant as Fowler, director of Argylle's spy organisation, based on Ritter, in Elly Conway's Argylle novels
- Tomás Paredes as Carlos, a Division field agent
- Jing Lusi as Li Na, a love interest of Argylle
- Rob Delaney as Deputy Director Powell
- Ben Daniels as Bartender, a spy at The King's Man Arms

== Production ==
=== Development ===
Argylle was announced in June 2021, with Matthew Vaughn attached to direct and produce for Marv Studios. The ensemble cast was announced in the following months, and it was reported that the script was written by Jason Fuchs. Dua Lipa, who also stars in the film, provided original music for the title track and score.

In August 2021, Apple TV+ bought the rights to the film for $200 million. Some industry journals wrote the production budget was $200 million, with The Hollywood Reporter claiming some sources put costs as high as $250 million. Director Matthew Vaughn disputed that claim, saying: "I don't know how you spend $200 million on it. I actually don't. Unless you're going to make a five-hour CG fest." Matthew Belloni of Puck News and The Ringer later reported that the film's budget was less than the $200 million figure, which was for the licensing and distribution rights to the film and not the actual budget as had been reported.

Vaughn said the COVID-19 pandemic gave him the time to work on the film. He describes it as his ode to 1980s action thrillers like Die Hard and Lethal Weapon. When asked about casting Cavill, he said: "I needed someone who was born to play Bond – which Henry is – and then nick him before Bond did. He plays a larger-than-life action hero with a wink. It's very different from Kingsman."

=== Filming ===
Principal photography began in August 2021 in London with cinematographer George Richmond, and took place across various locations in Europe. Filming wrapped in December 2021. The production used studios in Greenford, Park Royal and Bovingdon to shoot the film. Background shots were filmed in Greece and the United States.

== Marketing ==
Elly Conway, later revealed as the fictional author of the in-universe Argylle novels, was initially reported to have written the book that the script was based on during the film's announcement. The claim was questioned by The Hollywood Reporter in September 2022, as they were unable to verify Conway's existence and their attempts to contact her, her publicist and her talent agent were unsuccessful. The trailer revealed Conway was the film's protagonist. Several social media users attempted to identify Conway and theorised that singer-songwriter Taylor Swift had written the book with Conway as her pen name, based on several references associating Swift with Argylle. One example was that Elly Conway and Swift have a Scottish Fold cat. Vaughn denied the theory, stating Conway is unrelated to Swift; however, Swift influenced the film's use of a Scottish Fold cat. Bryce Dallas Howard, who plays Conway in the film, opined that Argylle is "unconsciously inspired" by Swift.

In February 2024, authors Terry Hayes and Tammy Cohen revealed they had written the tie-in novel. The tie-in book was released ahead of the film's release, on 9 January 2024. Apple and Universal spent $80 million promoting the film, each being responsible for funding 50% of the costs.

== Music ==
The film score was composed by Lorne Balfe in his first collaboration with Vaughn, and was recorded at the Abbey Road Studios in London during late 2022. It was released on 2 February 2024 through Platoon and Marv Music.

== Release ==
Argylle premiered at Odeon Luxe Leicester Square in London on 24 January 2024. In June 2023, it was announced that the film would be released in cinemas on 2 February 2024 through Universal Pictures and Apple Original Films, before releasing on Apple TV+ on 12 April 2024. The film's marketing campaign cost $80 million, of which Universal paid half. According to Deadline Hollywood, Universal "collects back what it's owed in marketing from the box office before it collects an 8% distribution fee."

== Reception ==
=== Box office ===
Argylle grossed $45.2 million in the United States and Canada, and $50.9 million in other territories, for a worldwide total of $96.1 million. Variety noted that for a traditional studio release, the film would need to gross around $500 million worldwide to break even.

In the United States and Canada, Argylle was projected to gross $15–20 million from 3,605 theatres in its opening weekend. The film made $6.4 million on its first day, including $1.7 million from Thursday night previews. It went on to debut to $17.5 million, topping the box office, though The Hollywood Reporter noted that "if legacy Hollywood studios released a $200 million movie with results like these, they would be skewered" and questioned whether Apple could continue to release $200 million films without better box office returns. In its second weekend the film dropped 63% to $6.5 million, remaining in first place of a "moribund box office" weekend. Variety called its first two weeks’ gross "dismal". The film made $4.7 million in its third weekend, finishing behind newcomers Bob Marley: One Love and Madame Web.

=== Critical response ===
On the review aggregator website Rotten Tomatoes, 32% of 305 critics' reviews are positive, with an average rating of 4.9/10. The website's consensus reads: "Argylle gets some mileage out of its silly, energetic spin on the spy thriller, but ultimately wears out its welcome with a convoluted plot and overlong runtime." Metacritic, which uses a weighted average, assigned the film a score of 35 out of 100, based on 56 critics, indicating "generally unfavorable" reviews. Audiences surveyed by CinemaScore gave the film an average grade of "C+" on an A+ to F scale, while those polled by PostTrak gave it a 3 out of 5 stars.

Forbes's Erik Kain noted that, in general, reviews criticised the film's length, number of plot twists, and use of CGI in action sequences, labelling it a parody of the genre. Brennan Klein of Screen Rant summarised the reviews as mixed, noting the polarised reception of the "meta" elements, while the cast received praise. Peter Bradshaw of The Guardian gave the film one star out of five and called it an "unbearably self-satisfied smirk of a spy caper from Matthew Vaughn"; various other reviews were also very negative. Jackson Weaver of CBC News conceded that the "movie's meta-backstory is much more interesting than its actual storyline, by a lot", while the Los Angeles Times's Katie Walsh, also quite critical of the film, mentioned its "amusing premise" and enjoyed Rockwell's presence.

Vaughn was surprised by the negative reviews, as test screenings had been well received, "I thought it was a fun, feel-good movie". He said the film did well on streaming and that he would be happy to make another one if he got the chance.

=== Accolades ===
Award	Date of ceremony	Category	Recipient	Result	Ref.
Golden Raspberry Awards	28 February 2025	Worst Actress	Bryce Dallas Howard	Nominated	
Golden Raspberry Awards	28 February 2025	Worst Supporting Actress	Ariana DeBose (Note: Also for Kraven the Hunter)	Nominated	
International Film Music Critics Association	27 February 2025	Best Original Score for an Action/Adventure Film	Lorne Balfe	Nominated	
Saturn Awards	2 February 2025	Best Action / Adventure Film	Argylle	Nominated	

== Future ==
=== Sequels ===
In July 2021, it was announced that Argylle was intended to be first of a franchise of at least three films. In March 2022, it was confirmed that the first film would be followed by two sequels to complete a film trilogy. In October 2023, Vaughn confirmed plans to develop sequels, while stating that the second film would be a prequel, as "the first Argylle novel", exploring the origins of Argylle becoming a spy; while the third movie would follow additional installments. On the film's release, its mid-credits scene, after displaying a younger Argylle (portrayed by Louis Partridge) being recruited by Kingsman, displays a note onscreen stating, "'Argylle: Book One – The Movie' coming soon". In February 2024, Vaughn confirmed that the prequel film was in development with Louis Partridge starring as Argylle (as portrayed by Cavill) in his formative years.

=== Shared universe ===
In October 2023, Matthew Vaughn announced his plans to create a larger spy-themed universe through his Marv Studios, with that universe being interconnected and comprising the Kingsman franchise, the Argylle films, and an unnamed third franchise. He intended to have the new upcoming films in each series culminate in a crossover in the future.
