= Swag (TV series) =

United Kingdom television series

- Genre: Prank Show
- Presented by: Jason Freeman
- Country of origin: United Kingdom
- Original language: English
- No. of series: 2

Production
- Running time: 30 minutes (inc. adverts)
- Production companies: SKA Films and Monkey Kingdom

Original release
- Network: Five
- Release: 23 March 2003 – 3 August 2004

Swag is a United Kingdom prank show broadcast on Five from 23 March 2003 to 3 August 2004. The general theme of the show was to trick members of the public into committing a minor crime (usually stealing) but then get their comeuppance in one way or another. There were some pranks that were repeated on multiple occasions, while others were one offs in a certain episode.

A very popular prank from the series was one where a car was parked on the side of a road with its keys in the door and left unlocked in order to tempt people to steal it. However, the car was fitted to lock when started and then do a variety of things, such as talk to the burglar or start snowing inside the car. They were eventually let out.

The show was conceived by Guy Ritchie and produced by his company SKA Films and the independent television company Monkey.

In one incident, a person enticed to steal an expensive car which was then filled with foam spotted the cameraman filming and stabbed him in the leg with a screwdriver.

A DVD of series one has been released on 19 September 2005, however there is still no word of series two on DVD.
