= Adam Bohling =

British film producer

Adam Bohling is a British film producer.

== Filmography ==
He was a producer in all films unless otherwise noted.

=== Film ===
Year	Film	Credit	Notes
2001	Mean Machine	Line producer	
2002	Swept Away	Co-producer	
2004	Layer Cake		
2006	Rang De Basanti	Executive producer	
2007	Mister Lonely	Co-producer	
2008	Freebird		
2008	Telstar: The Joe Meek Story		
2010	Kick-Ass		
2011	X-Men: First Class	Line producer	Uncredited
2013	Get Lucky	Executive producer	
2013	Kick-Ass 2		
2014	Kingsman: The Secret Service		
2015	Eddie the Eagle		
2017	Kingsman: The Golden Circle		
2019	Rocketman		
2021	Silent Night	Executive producer	
2021	The King's Man		
2024	Argylle		

Production manager

Year	Film	Role
1997	Nil by Mouth	Unit manager
1997	Stiff Upper Lips	Production manager: India
1998	Lock, Stock and Two Smoking Barrels	Production manager
1999	G:MT – Greenwich Mean Time	Production manager
2000	Best	Production manager
2000	Snatch	Production manager
2001	Fourplay	Production manager
2013	Kick-Ass 2	Unit production manager
2017	Kingsman: The Golden Circle	Unit production manager
2019	Rocketman	Unit production manager

Location management

Year	Film	Role
1996	Intimate Relations	Location manager
1998	Vigo	Location scout

Second unit director or assistant director

Year	Film	Role
1995	I Don't Speak English	Assistant director

Miscellaneous crew

Year	Film	Role
2000	Proof of Life	Military advisor

Thanks

Year	Film	Role
2004	Suzie Gold	The producers wish to thank
