= Kingsman: The Secret Service =

2014 film by Matthew Vaughn

- Theatrical release poster
- Directed by: Matthew Vaughn
- Screenplay by: Jane Goldman; Matthew Vaughn
- Based on: The Secret Service by: Mark Millar; Dave Gibbons
- Produced by: Matthew Vaughn; David Reid; Adam Bohling
- Starring: Colin Firth; Samuel L. Jackson; Mark Strong; Taron Egerton; Michael Caine
- Cinematography: George Richmond
- Edited by: Eddie Hamilton; Jon Harris
- Music by: Henry Jackman; Matthew Margeson
- Production companies: Marv Films; Cloudy Productions
- Distributed by: 20th Century Fox
- Release dates: December 13, 2014 (United States); January 29, 2015 (United Kingdom)
- Running time: 129 minutes
- Countries: United Kingdom; United States
- Language: English
- Budget: $81–94 million
- Box office: $414.4 million

Kingsman: The Secret Service is a 2014 spy action comedy film directed by Matthew Vaughn from a screenplay by Vaughn and Jane Goldman. Based on The Secret Service comic series, it is the first instalment in the Kingsman franchise and stars Colin Firth, Samuel L. Jackson, Mark Strong, Taron Egerton and Michael Caine. In the film, Gary "Eggsy" Unwin (Egerton) is recruited by Harry Hart (Firth) into Kingsman, a secret spy organisation, while they pursue the eco-terrorist Richmond Valentine (Jackson).

Development on Kingsman: The Secret Service began by October 2012, with Vaughn opting out of directing X-Men: Days of Future Past (2014) to work on the film. Firth joined the project in April 2013, and Jackson was cast soon after. Principal photography began in October 2013, with filming locations including Surrey and London. Henry Jackman and Matthew Margeson composed the film's score and soundtrack.

Kingsman: The Secret Service premiered at Butt-Numb-A-Thon in Austin, Texas on 13 December 2014 and was theatrically released first in the United Kingdom on 29 January 2015, and in the United States on February 13, by 20th Century Fox. It received generally positive reviews from critics and grossed $414 million worldwide. A sequel, Kingsman: The Golden Circle, was released in 2017, and a prequel, The King's Man, was released in 2021.

== Plot ==
In 1997, probationary secret agent Lee Unwin sacrifices himself during a mission in the Middle East to save his superior, Harry Hart. Feeling responsible for Lee's death, Harry gives Lee's young son, Gary "Eggsy" Unwin, a medal engraved with an emergency assistance number. Seventeen years later, Eggsy is arrested for stealing a car belonging to a friend of Eggsy's abusive stepfather, Dean. After Eggsy calls the number, Harry arranges Eggsy's release and violently confronts Dean and his gang. Harry later reveals to Eggsy that he is a member of Kingsman, a secret independent intelligence agency, as "Galahad", and nominates Eggsy to join the agency to replace "Lancelot", an agent recently killed by the assassin Gazelle while trying to rescue climate change professor James Arnold from kidnappers.

While Eggsy undergoes Kingsman training under the supervision of Kingsman technical support operative "Merlin", Harry interrogates James at Imperial College London after he is mysteriously returned unharmed by his kidnappers. When Harry attempts to question him, a microchip implanted in Arnold's neck explodes, killing him and putting Harry in a coma. The chip's signal is traced to billionaire philanthropist Richmond Valentine, who has recently distributed free SIM cards worldwide. Harry, after recovering from his coma, poses as a philanthropist to meet Valentine; Kingsman discover Valentine's close associates each have the same microchip implantation scar on their necks.

Eggsy forms a friendship with fellow recruit Roxy and survives a series of demanding tests. Eventually, only Eggsy and Roxy remain among the candidates. However, Eggsy fails the final test because he refuses to shoot the puppy he was previously tasked to raise; Roxy becomes the new "Lancelot", and it is revealed that the gun's bullets were blanks. Meanwhile, Harry discovers Valentine's connection to a religious hate group and travels to their church in Kentucky. Valentine activates a signal within the SIM-cards, which cause everyone in the church to become uncontrollably violent. Harry is forced to fight his way through the congregation and is the sole survivor, but Valentine later shoots him.

Back at Kingsman headquarters, Eggsy discovers that the agency's leader, Chester "Arthur" King, has a microchip implantation scar: Arthur reveals that the SIM-card signal will be launched to trigger global violence to drastically reduce the human population in order to combat climate change. Wealthy supporters and selected world leaders have been implanted with protective chips, and dissenters, including Crown Princess Tilde of Sweden, being imprisoned in Valentine's bunker. Eggsy leads Arthur to poison himself, and joins Merlin and Roxy to stop Valentine. Roxy destroys one of Valentine's satellites, and Eggsy poses as Arthur to infiltrate Valentine's bunker. He is soon discovered by failed Kingsman recruit Charlie Hesketh; Valentine secures a satellite replacement and launches the signal.

As global chaos erupts, Eggsy kills Gazelle while Merlin activates a failsafe in the implanted chips, causing the heads of Valentine's allies to explode; Eggsy then kills Valentine with one of Gazelle's prosthetic blades, ending the signal. In a mid-credits scene, Eggsy, the new "Galahad", offers his mother and younger half-sister a new home while he confronts Dean and his gang.

== Cast ==
- Colin Firth as Harry Hart / Galahad
- Samuel L. Jackson as Richmond Valentine
- Mark Strong as Hamish Mycroft / Merlin
- Taron Egerton as Gary "Eggsy" Unwin / Galahad
  - Alex Nikolov as Young Eggsy
- Sophie Cookson as Roxanne "Roxy" Morton / Lancelot
- Jack Davenport as James Spencer / Lancelot
- Mark Hamill as Professor James Arnold
- Sofia Boutella as Gazelle
- Edward Holcroft as Charles "Charlie" Hesketh
- Jack Cutmore-Scott as Rufus Saville
- Geoff Bell as Dean Anthony Baker
- Samantha Womack as Michelle Unwin
- Michael Caine as Chester King / Arthur

Hanna Alström appears as Tilde, Crown Princess of Sweden, and Bjørn Floberg appears as Morten Lindström, the Swedish Prime Minister. Lily Travers portrays Lady Sophie. Jonno Davies plays Lee Unwin, Eggsy's late father and a former Kingsman candidate who sacrificed himself to save Hart. Nicholas Banks, Nicholas Agnew, Rowan Polonski and Tom Prior portray Digby Barker, Nathaniel, Piers and Hugo Higins, respectively, the other four Kingsman candidates. Fiona Hampton plays Amelia, a Kingsman employee who masquerades as a candidate in order to "die" during the first test. Richard Brake plays the interrogator during the penultimate test.

== Production ==
=== Development ===
Development on Kingsman: The Secret Service initially began in January 2012, when Mark Millar and Matthew Vaughn discussed the overly serious nature of modern spy films, and their desire to do "a fun [film]." Vaughn opted out of directing X-Men: Days of Future Past (2014) to focus on Kingsman: The Secret Service, which he later called "a really tough decision". He reasoned that if he did not do it, "somebody else ... [would] wake up and do a fun spy movie. Then I would have written a bloody screenplay that no one would want to make."

In writing Kingsman: The Secret Service, Vaughn watched several James Bond films, and assessed that each film contained sexual innuendos that "always come from the men". This inspired him to write a scene in Kingsman: The Secret Service where Princess Tilde, a female character, explicitly requests for anal sex. The scene was criticized upon release, with some publications accusing Vaughn of misogyny. During filming, an alternate version of the film was cut, which removed the scene and other references to it.

=== Casting ===
Colin Firth joined the cast on 29 April 2013. It was initially reported that Leonardo DiCaprio was in talks to play the film's villain, which was denied by Vaughn. Samuel L. Jackson was later hired to portray the film's villain, who took the role in-part because of a career-long aspiration to appear in a James Bond film. Reasoning that an appearance in a Bond film was unlikely, he took on the role as "an opportunity to play a really great Bond villain." Jackson's character has a notable lisp, which was partially inspired by the stutter he had during his childhood. In September 2013, Vaughn cast Sophie Cookson for the female lead, preferring a then less-established actor, and reportedly selected her over Emma Watson and Bella Heathcote. Mark Hamill was cast as Professor James Arnold, who is the primary antagonist in the comic book series; his character was changed in the film.

=== Filming ===
Principal photography began on 6 October 2013 in Deepcut, Surrey, on a budget reported to be one-third of the $200 million budget of Skyfall. The Alexandra Road Estate in Camden depicted Eggsy's home, and some scenes were filmed at Imperial College London. The Black Prince Pub in Kennington was used for various fight scenes and the car chase. Savile Row in Mayfair, including the exterior of Huntsman, was used to depict the organisation's headquarters. Huntsman and James Lock & Co., where some filming also took place, provided clothing and hats for the film. To depict the villains' heads exploding "in a Busby Berkeley firework display", Vaughn visited three different effects studios to achieve a "surreal" and "enjoyable" sequence; he eventually commissioned the third effects house to produce the sequence.

=== Music ===
In May 2014, Henry Jackman and Matthew Margeson were confirmed to compose the film's score and soundtrack, and in July, it was announced that Gary Barlow would contribute original music alongside submitting "Get Ready for It" by Take That, which played during the end credits. For the church fight scene, Vaughn originally intended to use "November Rain" but found the song "darker than [he] realised" and its guitar solo too short. After an online search for "great long American guitar solos", the scene was shot with "Free Bird" instead; Giles Martin, George Martin's son and Vaughn's friend, remixed the song from the original stems for the film.

== Release ==
Kingsman: The Secret Service's UK premiere was held in London on 14 January 2015, and featured Vaughn, Firth, Egerton and Strong; the premiere included a live performance of "Get Ready for It" by Take That. A regional premiere was held in Glasgow and ran concurrently to the London event, with live footage streamed from the London premiere during the Glasgow premiere. Comic book writer Mark Millar hosted a charity screening of the film ahead of its release in Glasgow to raise money for his old school, St. Bartholomews.

Kingsman: The Secret Service opened in the United Kingdom on 29 January 2015. In the United States, it was set to release on 14 November 2014, but was delayed to 6 March 2015. It was later moved up to 24 October 2014, before settling on its 13 February 2015 release date. The film was released in most of Latin America and Indonesia with the church scene (considered narratively important by Vaughn and film critics) being excised almost completely, leaving only the set-up and immediate consequences.

=== Marketing ===
The trade paperback collecting the comics miniseries was released on 14 January 2015. Vaughn collaborated with luxury retailer Mr Porter to create a 60-piece clothing line based on Kingsman: The Secret Service. Mr Porter worked with the film's costume designer, Arianne Phillips, to design the bespoke suiting, while other accessories, shirts and shoes designed by heritage brands such as Cutler and Gross, George Cleverley and Mackintosh. The collaboration made Kingsman: The Secret Service one of the only films which collated and released non-merchandise replica outfits for fans to purchase. The film also includes significant product placement for Adidas Originals.

Kingsman: The Secret Service was set to include a teaser trailer featuring all six actors who portrayed James Bond—Sean Connery, George Lazenby, Roger Moore, Timothy Dalton, Pierce Brosnan, and Daniel Craig—sitting in a room and discussing the need for a new generation of secret agents; the trailer would conclude with Harry and Eggsy entering the room. Despite all the actors agreeing to appear, plans for the trailer were shelved due to Connery's dementia.

=== Home media ===
Kingsman: The Secret Service was released on digital HD in the United Kingdom on 15 May 2015, and on Blu-ray and DVD on 9 June. It was released on 4K UHD Blu-ray on 1 March 2016.

== Reception ==
=== Box office ===
Kingsman: The Secret Service grossed $414.4 million worldwide; it grossed $24.2 million in the United Kingdom and $128.3 million in North America.

Kingsman opened on 29 January 2015 in the UK, Sweden, Ireland and Malta. In the UK, the film opened with $6.5 million and debuted at second place in the box office (behind Big Hero 6). The following weekend, it opened in Australia and New Zealand, debuting atop the box office in both countries; it grossed $3.6 million in its first weekend in Australia. In its third weekend, it earned $23 million from 4,844 screens in 39 countries. It topped the box office in three countries: Singapore, Hong Kong and Thailand. In its fourth weekend, it expanded to a total of 54 countries and grossed $33.4 million from 5,940 screens. Its biggest opener outside of North America was in China, where it earned $27.9 million. Other high openings occurred in South Korea ($5.3 million), Russia and the CIS ($3.6 million), Taiwan ($3.4 million), and France ($3.3 million).

In the United States and Canada, the film opened on 13 February and was predicted to debut to around $28 million. The film opened in 3,204 cinemas and grossed $10.4 million on its first day, $15.4 million on its second day and $10.4 million on its third day, for a weekend gross of $36.2 million (an $11,300-per-cinema average), finishing second at the box office behind Fifty Shades of Grey. During the four-day February Presidents Day weekend, it grossed $41.8 million.

=== Critical response ===
The review aggregator website Rotten Tomatoes sampled 263 critics and judged 75% of the reviews positive, with an average rating of 6.8/10, calling the film "Stylish, subversive, and above all fun, Kingsman: The Secret Service finds director Matthew Vaughn sending up the spy genre with gleeful abandon." On Metacritic, the film has a weighted average score of 60 out of 100, based on 50 critics, indicating "mixed or average" reviews. Audiences polled by CinemaScore, gave the film a grade of "B+" on an A+ to F scale.

Peter Travers of Rolling Stone said of the film, "This slam-bang action [film] about British secret agents is deliriously shaken, not stirred... Even when it stops making sense, Kingsman is unstoppable fun". Jordan Hoffman, writing for The Guardian, said of the film, "The spirit of 007 is all over this [and] Vaughn's script has a licence to poke fun... No one involved in the production can believe they're getting away with making such a batshit Bond." Comparing the film to those of Christopher Nolan, Hoffman said, "Despite the presence of grandfatherly Michael Caine, Kingsman's tone is about as far from the Christopher Nolan-style superhero film as you can get. Verisimilitude is frequently traded in for a rich laugh". Peter Bradshaw, writing for The Guardian, called the film "a smirking spy spoof, weirdly charmless and dated in unintentional ways", commenting that "it is a film forever demanding to be congratulated on how 'stylish' it is."

Other reviewers were mixed or critical. Anthony Lane of The New Yorker stated, "Few recent [films] have fetched quite as far as Kingsman, and countless viewers will relish the brazen zest of its invention." However, Lane was critical of the film's use of stereotypes. Manohla Dargis of The New York Times enjoyed the film, but criticised Vaughn's use of violence as a cinematic tool, calling it "narrative overkill". Jason Ward of The Guardian wrote that "[e]verything about Kingsman exists to disguise the fact that it is solidly conservative", criticizing Valentine's plan as undermining environmentalists. Likewise, The A.V. Club's Ignatiy Vishnevetsky commented that, "Far from being a Team America-style send-up of gentleman spy movies, Kingsman is actually even more reactionary than the movies it's referencing; it traffics in the kind of Tory values Bond flicks merely suggest", and while he praised its "fun" visuals, concluded that "it's hard to separate its bespoke fashions, future-vintage gadgets, and aristocratic décor from its fusty worldview". Peter Sobczynski of RogerEbert.com, who gave the film two out of four stars, likened it to the spy film equivalent of Scream (1996) and criticised the overuse of violence.

=== Accolades ===
Accolades received by Kingsman: The Secret Service
Award	Date of ceremony	Category	Recipient(s)	Result	Ref.
Costume Designers Guild Awards	23 February 2016	Excellence in Contemporary Film	Arianne Phillips	Nominated	
Empire Awards	29 March 2015	Best British Film	Kingsman: The Secret Service	Won	
Empire Awards	29 March 2015	Best Male Newcomer	Taron Egerton	Won	
Empire Awards	29 March 2015	Best Female Newcomer	Sophie Cookson	Nominated	
Empire Awards	29 March 2015	Best Thriller	Kingsman: The Secret Service	Nominated	
Golden Trailer Awards	6 May 2015	Best Action	"Trailer E: Path" (Wild Card)	Nominated	
Golden Trailer Awards	6 May 2015	Best Billboard	"Gazelle" (The Refinery AV)	Nominated	
Golden Trailer Awards	4 May 2016	Best Foreign TV Spot	"Save the World" (Mob Scene Creative)	Nominated	
Guild of Music Supervisors Awards	21 January 2016	Best Music Supervision for Films Budgeted Over $25 Million	Ian Neil	Nominated	
International Film Music Critics Association Awards	18 February 2016	Best Original Score for an Action/Adventure/Thriller Film	Henry Jackman and Matthew Margeson	Nominated	
Japan Academy Film Prize	4 March 2016	Outstanding Foreign Language Film	Kingsman: The Secret Service	Nominated	
London Film Critics' Circle Awards	17 January 2016	British Actor of the Year	Michael Caine	Nominated (Note: Also for Youth (2015))	
MTV Movie Awards	10 April 2016	Best Villain	Samuel L. Jackson	Nominated	
Saturn Awards	22 June 2016	Best Comic-to-Film Motion Picture	Kingsman: The Secret Service	Nominated	
Saturn Awards	22 June 2016	Best Writing	Jane Goldman and Matthew Vaughn	Nominated	
Saturn Awards	22 June 2016	Best Actor	Taron Egerton	Nominated	
Saturn Awards	22 June 2016	Best Editing	Eddie Hamilton and Jon Harris	Nominated	
Saturn Awards	22 June 2016	Best Costume Design	Arianne Phillips	Nominated	
Teen Choice Awards	16 August 2015	Choice Movie – Action	Kingsman: The Secret Service	Nominated	
Teen Choice Awards	16 August 2015	Choice Movie: Breakout Star	Taron Egerton	Nominated	

== Sequel ==
Millar and Vaughn stated that a sequel was possible if Kingsman: The Secret Service performed well at the box office. Vaughn expressed interest in directing the sequel, as well bringing back Firth, Strong and Egerton. 20th Century Fox announced a sequel in April 2015, and in June, Vaughn was confirmed as its writer and director. Julianne Moore and Halle Berry were confirmed to join the cast in April 2016, while Edward Holcroft and Cookson were also confirmed to return. The sequel, Kingsman: The Golden Circle, was released in 2017.
