= James Lock & Co. =

Hat shop in London, England

Coordinates: 51.5057°N 0.1382°W

Lock & Co. Hatters
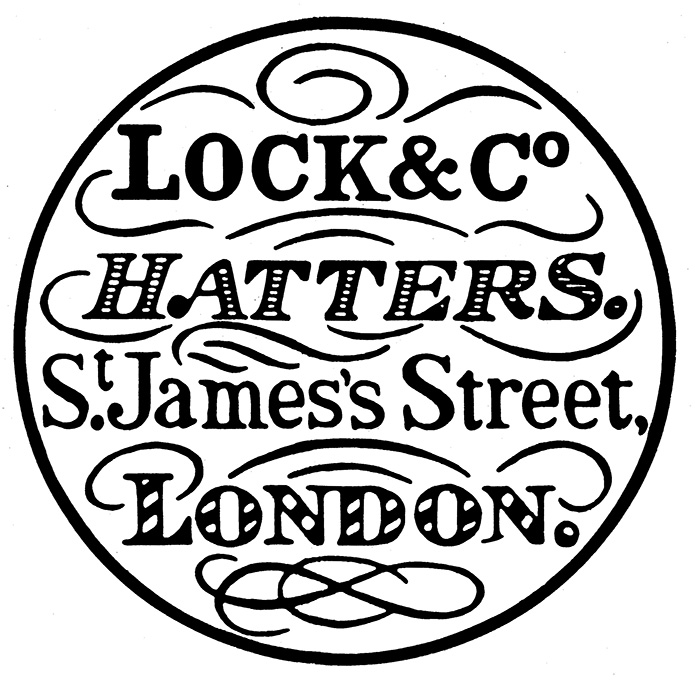

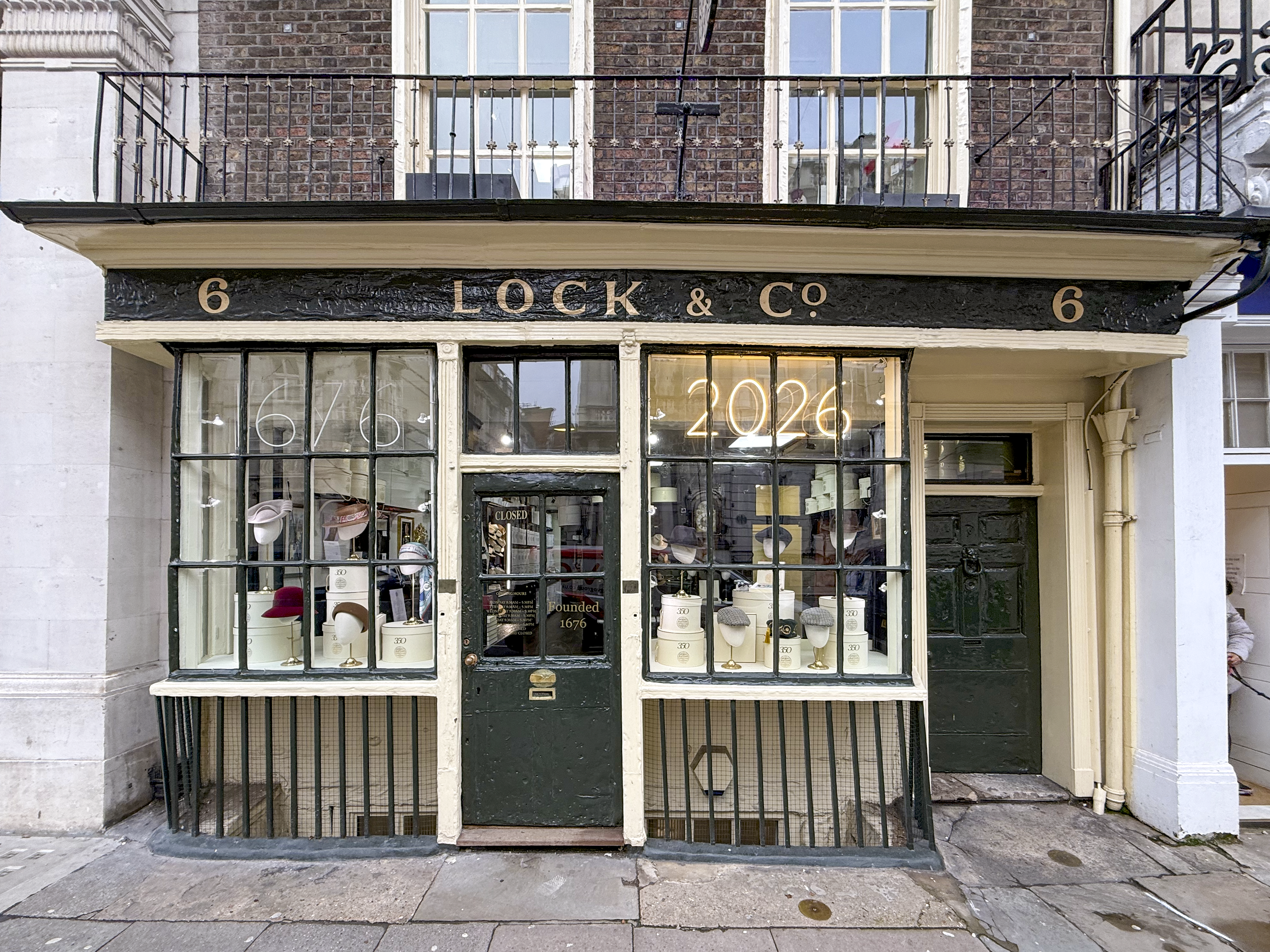
- Type: Private limited company
- Industry: Clothing
- Founded: 1676; 350 years ago in London, England
- Founder: Robert Davis
- Headquarters: 6 St James's Street, London, United Kingdom
- Products: Hats
- Website: lockhatters.co.uk

Lock & Co. Hatters (formally James Lock and Co. Ltd) is the world's oldest hat shop, the world's 34th oldest family-owned business and is a royal warrant holder. Its shop is located at 6 St James's Street, London, and is a Grade II* listed building.

== History ==
The company was founded in 1676 by Robert Davis. His son Charles continued the business and took James Lock (1731–1806) on as an apprentice in 1747. James later married Charles Davis's only child, Mary. When Davis died in 1759, James Lock inherited the company from his former master, and the Lock family, James's descendants, still own and run the company today. The shop has been in its current location since 1765, making it the world's oldest hat shop, and purportedly the oldest family-run business operating in the world.

The company is responsible for the origination of the bowler hat. In 1849, Edward Coke, nephew of Thomas Coke, 1st Earl of Leicester, and the younger brother of Thomas Coke, 2nd Earl of Leicester, requested a hat to solve the problem of gamekeepers' headgear. Traditional top hats were too fragile and too tall (often getting knocked off by low branches) for the job. The company commissioned London hat-makers William and Thomas Bowler to solve the problem. Anecdotally, when Coke returned for his new hat, he dropped it on the floor and stamped on it twice to test its strength before paying 12 shillings and leaving satisfied.

Admiral Lord Nelson wore a bicorne of the brand's into the Battle of Trafalgar complete with eye-shade. Beau Brummell procured its hats as part of his sartorial arsenal. Winston Churchill adopted their Cambridge and Homburg hats as sartorial signatures.

In 2026, the company celebrated its 350th anniversary.

=== Notable clients ===
Notable customers of the past include Admiral Lord Nelson and Oscar Wilde.

Later famous clients have included Terry Pratchett, Cecil Beaton, David Beckham, Victor Borge, Pierce Brosnan, Jackie Chan, Charlie Chaplin, Eric Clapton, Douglas Fairbanks Jr (who lived in a flat above the shop), Alec Guinness, Jeremy Irons, Patrick Macnee (while playing John Steed), Peter O'Toole, Gary Oldman, Laurence Olivier, Michael Palin, Donald Sinden, and the Duke of Windsor.

=== Royal warrants ===
Lock & Co. is a royal warrant holder as Hatter to the Prince of Wales (later King Charles III). The hatmaker formerly had a Royal warrant from Prince Philip, Duke of Edinburgh, until his death in 2021.

== In media ==
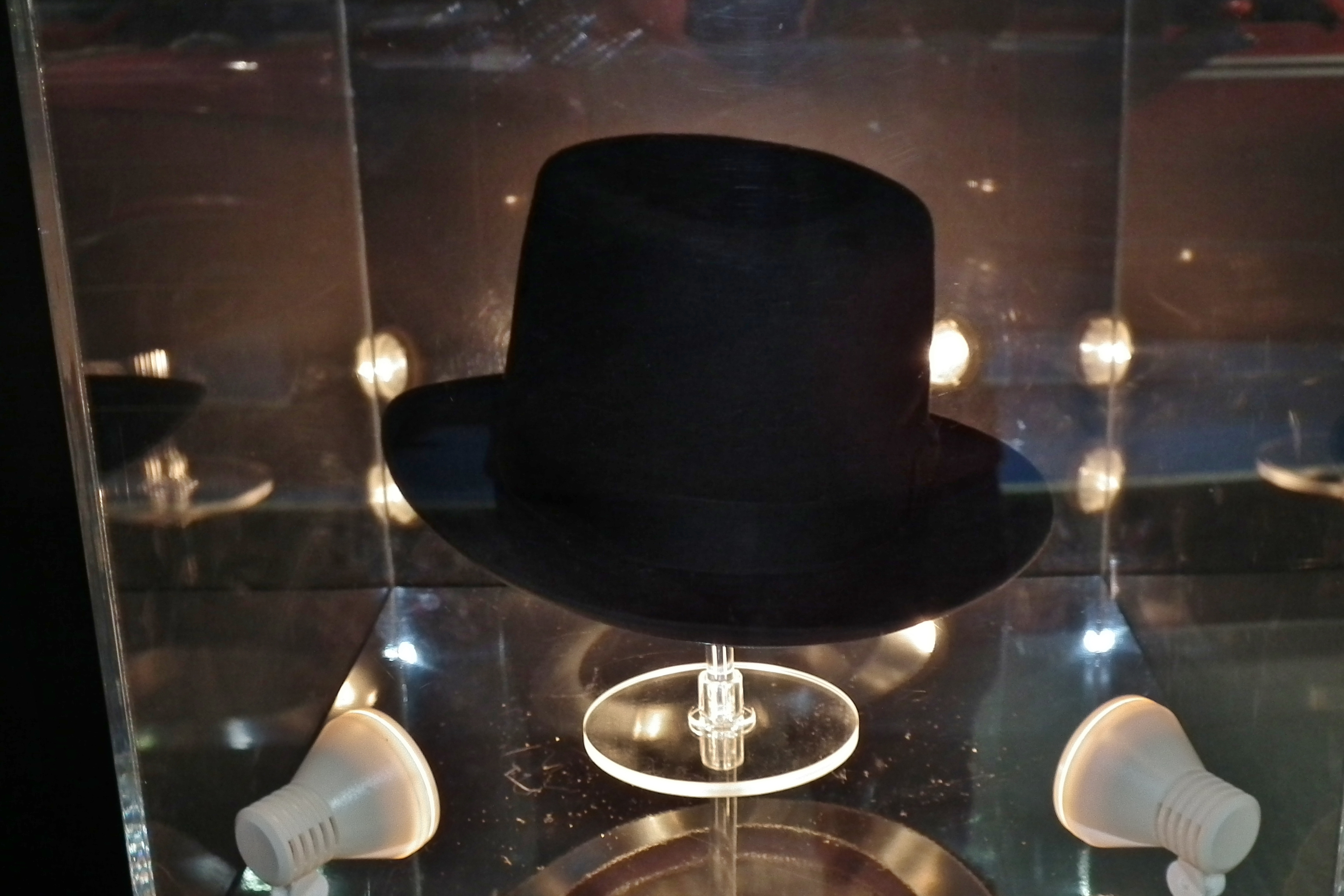
Oddjob's Bowler Hat, created by Lock & Co, on display in the James Bond Experience exhibition at the National Motor Museum in Beaulieu, Hampshire, England.

Lock & Co. hats feature prominently in the James Bond franchise, being worn by James Bond in Dr. No in the gun-barrel sequence, and OddJob in Goldfinger.

Costume designer Jacqueline Durran selected Lock and Co for the 2017 film, Darkest Hour, to recreate Churchill's hat.
