= The Ambassadors (comics) =

- Publisher: Image Comics
- First appearance: The Ambassadors #1 (March 2023)
- Created by: Mark Millar
- Characters: Ahmed Khan / Codename: Pakistan; Binnu Bhatia / Codename: India; Bob Taylor / Codename: Australia; Choon-He / Codename: Korea; Yasmine Gauvin / Codename: France; Jean-Luc Gauvin / Codename: France Jr.; Zee / Codename: Brazil; Dave Lizewski / Codename: America

The Ambassadors

Series publication information
- Publisher: Image Comics
- Format: Limited series
- Number of issues: (vol. 1); 6; (Big Game); 5

Creative team
- Artist(s): Frank Quitely (#1); Karl Kerschl (#2); Travis Charest (#3); Olivier Coipel (#4); Matteo Buffagni (#5); Matteo Scalera (#6)

The Ambassadors is an American comic book maxiseries published by Image Comics and set in the Millarworld, about the Ambassadors superhero team. After the initial six-issue series, team returned in the crossover miniseries Big Game and the Dark Horse Comics series Nemesis: Forever. The original team consists of international characters, with Dave Lizewski (the former Kick-Ass and protagonist of Kick-Ass – The Dave Lizewski Years) joining the team in Big Game.

The Ambassadors have received a generally positive critical reception.

== Story ==
In The Ambassadors, the Ambassadors are formed by South Korean scientist Choon-He, who cracks the code to create superhumans, copying her mind to an identical superpowered body while falsely imprisoned before killing herself in prison to ensure continuity with her duplicate, Ambassador: South Korea. On Choon-He choosing worthy members from the countries of the world to also grant powers from those who apply, the Ambassadors set out to save the world from the nefarious actions of Choon-He's ex-husband, who has also given himself superpowers.

In Big Game, the Ambassadors are initially massacred by Nemesis before being saved by a time-travelling Hit-Girl using Chrononaut technology and beating Nemesis to a pulp, leaving him hospitalised, before joining the other superheroes of the world assembled by Hit-Girl to take down the Fraternity. In the aftermath of the battle, Dave Lizewski, the former Kick-Ass, granted superpowers by the Magic Order, joins the Ambassadors as Codename: America.

In Nemesis: Rogues' Gallery, Nemesis swears revenge on the Ambassadors and the other superheroes on escaping from hospital on recovery, doing so over Nemesis: Forever.

== Reception ==
Issue #	Publication date	Critic rating	Critic reviews	Ref.
1	March 2023	8.9/10	8	
2	April 2023	8.9/10	4	
3	April 2023	9.8/10	3	
4	May 2023	8.9/10	3	
5	May 2023	7.9/10	3	
6	June 2023	7.5/10	4	
Overall		8.6/10	25	

== Collected editions ==
Title	Material collected	Format	Publication date	ISBN
The Ambassadors	The Ambassadors #1–6	Trade paperback	August 9, 2023	978-1-5343-9981-5
Big Game	Big Game #1–5	Trade paperback	December 20, 2023	978-1-5343-9911-2
The Ambassadors Library Edition	The Ambassadors #1–6	Trade paperback	December 24, 2024	978-1-5067-4439-1
