= MPH (comics) =

Comic book limited series

- Connecting variant covers of MPH #2 (June 2014), depicting the characters of the Millarworld Universe; art by Leinil Francis Yu.

Publication information
- Publisher: Image Comics
- Schedule: Monthly/Bi-monthly
- Format: Limited series
- Publication date: May 2014 – February 2015
- No. of issues: 5
- Main characters: Roscoe Rodriguez; Rosa Cruz; Chevy; Jiggy "Baseball" Cruz

Creative team
- Created by: Mark Millar; Duncan Fegredo
- Written by: Mark Millar
- Artist: Duncan Fegredo
- Letterer: Peter Doherty
- Colorist: Peter Doherty
- Editor: Jennifer Lee

Collected editions
- MPH: ISBN 978-163215-2657

MPH (Miles Per Hour) is a British heist-action-thriller comic book limited series written by Mark Millar and illustrated by Duncan Fegredo. Published by Image Comics, the series is set in the Millarworld, with its events being first referenced in 2014's Kick-Ass: The Dave Lizewski Years – Book Four. Described as "The Fast and the Furious without cars", the series follows a group of early-20s criminals who on discovering a drug that gives them super-speed, use it to go on a series of grand heists, while pursued by a government agency with a mysterious speedster of their own. The series, originally published between May 21, 2014, and February 18, 2015, was collected as a graphic novel on April 22, 2015. Characters from the series would later return in the miniseries Big Game in 2023. Receiving a generally positive critical reception, both a comic book sequel and feature film adaptation of the series have been in development hell since its initial publication.

== Premise ==
When Motor City criminal Roscoe Rodriguez stumbles upon a street drug called MPH, he gains the power of super-speed, using it to break out of prison and with his friends form a group of working class criminals to go on a series of high-octane urban adventures as bank robbers, while pursued by the forces of DENO and the mysterious Mr. Springfield. While the initial announcement of the series described it as a six-issue series following teenagers, the final five-issue series saw the majority of its protagonists be in their early-to-mid 20s.

== Characters ==
Connecting variant covers of MPH #1 (May 2014), depicting the Runners: Baseball (Jiggy Cruz), Chevy, Rosa Cruz, and Roscoe Rodriguez; art by Duncan Fegredo.

The Runners

- Roscoe Rodriguez – A low-level criminal obsessed with vision boards who breaks out of prison on gaining super-speed from the experimental drug "MPH", one pill of which provides the user a day of the power, which Roscoe uses to make him and his loved ones rich by becoming high-profile bank robbers and America's Most Wanted. Originally named "Roscoe Vasquez" throughout the development of MPH, the character was renamed by Mark Millar before final publication to have a more alliterative name.
- Rosa Cruz – Roscoe's girlfriend, a Jeet Kune Do expert with whom he shares his super-speed, who tries to keep her younger brother "Baseball" out of the criminal lifestyle after the death of their other brother, Roberto.
- Chevy – Roscoe's best friend, with whom he shares his super-speed. Having previously been secretly in love with Rosa, he develops a god complex from his use of the pills, coming to blows with Roscoe and Rosa after they give away their money.
- "Baseball" – Rosa's sixteen-year-old little brother, a would-be gangster whom she rescues from a life of crime. Baseball's full name (and in-turn Rosa's surname), "Jiggy Cruz", was revealed in the final issue as the result of a charity competition held by Mark Millar to allow a fan to name an MPH character after themselves, a competition Millar had previously used to name characters in Kick-Ass, Nemesis, Kingsman: The Secret Service, Starlight, and Jupiter's Legacy.

DENO

- "Mr. Springfield" – The world's first and only known superhuman, an apparent pre-cog who crashed into Missouri at super-speed in 1986 before being arrested by the government, who has been living in luxury house arrest under the confine of DENO in Arizona for the past 29 years. Mr. Springfield would return in a cameo appearance in the 2023 limited series Big Game.
- Special Agent Cutler – An agent of the United States Department of Extra-Normal Operations (DENO), assigned to Mr. Springfield.
- Kat – the head of DENO.

Other

- "Samurai Hal" – A Detroit-based low-level crime boss and strip club owner who was once Roscoe's employer.
- Professor Henri Troyat/Orlov – The former Chief Scientific Officer of France's superhuman development program and inventor of the "MPH" pill, who disappeared in 1984 and has been living in-hiding ever since (bar attending the occasional jazz festival). A fictionalised version of the author of the same name, Mark Millar revealed in an interview in January 2014 that the character would return in another then-untitled title set in the Millarworld shared fictional universe the following year, which turned out to be Huck, written by Millar and illustrated by Rafael Albuquerque.

== Reception ==
Issue #	Publication date	Critic rating	Critic reviews	Ref.
1	May 2014	6.9/10	23	
2	June 2014	7.6/10	14	
3	September 2014	8.0/10	4	
4	November 2014	7.6/10	4	
5	February 2015	8.6/10	4	
Overall		7.7/10	49	

== Adaptation ==
Ahead of its initial publication, MPH was optioned for feature film adaptation by Lorenzo di Bonaventura in April 2014, who Mark Millar said to be "somebody I've always wanted to work with on one of the bigger Millarworld adaptations", with the project ultimately entering development hell.
