= Prodigy. =

Comic book series

- Cover of the first trade paperback. Art by Ozgur Yildirim.

Publication information
- Publisher: Image Comics
- Schedule: Monthly
- Genre: Superhero
- Publication date: December 2018 – June 2019
- No. of issues: 6 + 5 + 5
- Main characters: Edison Crane; Rachel Straks; Felix Koffka

Creative team
- Written by: Mark Millar
- Artists: Rafael Albuquerque (Volume 1); Matteo Buffagni (Volume 2); Pepe Larraz (Big Game); Stefano Landini (Volume 3)
- Letterer: Peter Doherty
- Colorist: Marcelo Maiolo
- Editor: Rachael Fulton

Collected editions
- Prodigy. The Evil Earth: ISBN 1-5343-1236-6
- Prodigy. The Icarus Society: ISBN 1-5343-2455-0
- Big Game: ISBN 1-5343-9911-9
- Prodigy. Slaves of Mars: ISBN 1-5067-4489-3

Prodigy. is a British comic book series created by Mark Millar and Rafael Albuquerque, who respectively write and illustrate the first volume, and published by Image Comics. The title was announced near the end of 2018 as the second comic book collaboration between Mark Millar and Netflix, after the company acquired the Millarworld imprint of creator-owned titles in the summer of 2017, and to be adapted as a film exclusive to the streaming service, along with other of the imprint's comic book series. The first volume ran for six issues from December 2018 to June 2019, and a trade paperback collecting the series, subtitled Prodigy. The Evil Earth, was released the next month.

Three sequels followed: Prodigy. The Icarus Society (2022; illustrated by Matteo Buffagni), Big Game (2023; illustrated by Pepe Larraz), and Prodigy. Slaves of Mars (2024; illustrated by Stefano Landini), published by Dark Horse Comics.

== Plot summary ==
=== The Evil Earth ===
Edison Crane isn't content being the world's smartest man and most successful businessman – his brilliant mind needs to be constantly challenged. He's a Nobel Prize-winning scientist, a genius composer, an Olympic athlete, and an expert in the occult, and now international governments are calling on him to fix problems they just can't handle.

=== The Icarus Society ===
Edison Crane has always been the smartest man in the room. Now he's in a world he didn't even know existed with the Icarus Society, a secret society of super geniuses all richer than he is. Blackmailed into recovering an artefact on a mission they know is almost certain death, Edison and the richest man alive, Felix Koffka, must search for the lost city of Shangri-La, where the world's most evil people have been pulled for thousands of years.

=== Big Game ===
While excavating the remnants of the Royal Empire, a prehistoric galactic empire that considered Earth its capital, Edison Crane is recruited by "Bobbie Griffin", formerly the Batgirl of the DC Universe prior to its transmogrification into the Millarworld, who with the Chrononauts must face off against the Secret Lord of Earth and leader of the Fraternity of Super-Criminals Wesley Gibson, who aims to wipe out all the world's superhumans as his father had once done in 1986, as well as the Royal Empire, their fleet brought to the future by Mindy McCready.

=== Slaves of Mars ===
On March 21, 2024, Mark Millar announced that Prodigy. Slaves of Mars was set for publication from Dark Horse Comics in August 2024.

== Collected editions ==
Title	Material collected	Format	Publication date	ISBN
Volume 1: The Evil Earth	Prodigy #1–6	Trade paperback	July 31, 2019	978-1534312364
Volume 2: The Icarus Society	Prodigy. The Icarus Society #1–5	Trade paperback	January 11, 2023	978-1534324558
Crossover: Big Game	Big Game #1–5	Trade paperback	December 20, 2023	978-1534399112
Volume 3: Slaves of Mars	Prodigy. Slaves of Mars #1–5	Trade paperback	April 29, 2025	978-1506744896

== Netflix adaptation ==
In the summer of 2017, Netflix acquired Mark Millar's comic book publishing company Millarworld, and the next summer, announced that it had greenlit two series based on Jupiter's Legacy and American Jesus, and three films based on Empress, Huck and Sharkey the Bounty Hunter.

In June 2018, Mark Millar announced the release of The Magic Order, the first comic book series under the Millarworld imprint since Netflix acquired the publisher, and in November of the same year, announced Prodigy., one month before the release of the first issue, with both being considered to be adapted as an episodic series and a feature film respectively.

In March 2020, it was reported that the series will be adapted into a feature film, with Kaz Firpo and Ryan Firpo writing the script.

In March 2022, Millar confirmed the title would be the first major movie to come out on Netflix since the acquisition in 2017.

In November 2022, Miller and Matteo Buffagni announced via the synopsis for the finale of Prodigy. The Icarus Society that the volume would serve as the basis for the Prodigy feature film.
