= Peter Doherty (comics) =

British comic book artist and colourist

- Areas: Artist, Colorist
- Notable works: Judge Dredd; Grendel Tales; Shaolin Cowboy; MPH; Empress; The Red Diamond; Chrononauts

Peter Doherty is a British comic book artist and colourist.

== Biography ==
Doherty's work over a 15-year career has mainly been concentrated on the 2000 AD character Judge Dredd. Episodes of the strip illustrated by him include "Bury My Knee At Wounded Heart"; the origins story "Judge Death: Boyhood of a Superfiend"; and the swansong story of long-running support cast member Chief Judge McGruder, "Death of a Legend".

Outside 2000 AD, Doherty's work includes Grendel Tales and Shaolin Cowboy.

Doherty is currently working on Devlin Waugh and the works of the Millarworld.

== Bibliography ==
Comics work (pencils and inks, unless specified) includes:

- "Felicity" (with Chris Standley, in Crisis #47, 1990)
- "Young Death" (with John Wagner, in Judge Dredd Megazine vol.1 #1–12, 1990–1991, collected in Young Death: Boyhood of a Superfiend, May 2008, ISBN 1-905437-65-X)
- Judge Dredd:
  - "Justice One" (with Garth Ennis, in 2000 AD #766–771, 1992)
  - "Judgement Day" (with Garth Ennis, in 2000 AD #786–799, 1992, collected in Judgement Day, Hamlyn, 1999, ISBN 0-600-59970-1, Rebellion, 2004, ISBN 1-904265-19-7)
  - "Mechanismo Returns" (with John Wagner, in Judge Dredd Megazine vol.2 #22–26, 1993)
  - "Roadkill" (with John Smith, in 2000 AD #856–858, 1993)
  - "Bury My Knee at Wounded Heart" (with John Wagner, in Judge Dredd Megazine vol.2 #46, 1994)
  - "Mr Bennet joins the Judges" (with Mark Millar, in 2000 AD Sci-Fi Special 1994)
  - "Prologue" (with John Wagner, in Judge Dredd Megazine vol.2 #57, 1994)
  - "Moving Violation" (with Chris Standley, in 2000 AD #856–858, 1994)
  - "TV Babies" (with Chris Standley, in 2000 AD #898, 1994)
  - "Death of a Legend" (with John Wagner, in 2000 AD #1009, 1996)
  - "Spawney" (with John Wagner, in 2000 AD #1067–1068, 1996)
  - "Simp City" (with John Wagner, in 2000 AD #1119–1120, 1998)
  - "Dumskulls" (with Alan Grant, in 2000 AD #1171, 1998)
  - "Slow Crime Day" (with John Wagner, in 2000 AD #1191, 2000)
  - "The All New Adventures of P. J. Maybe" (with John Wagner, in 2000 AD #1204, 2000)
  - "Blow Out!" (with John Wagner, in 2000 AD #1213, 2000)
  - "Born Under a Bad Sign" (with Robbie Morrison, in 2000 AD #1275, 2002)
  - "Dead Lost in Mega-City One" (with John Wagner, in Judge Dredd Megazine vol.4 #9, 2002)
  - "Satan's Last Assault on Grud's Kingdom" (with Alan Grant, in 2000 AD #1288, 2002)
  - "A Right Royal Occasion" (with Gordon Rennie, in 2000 AD #1293, 2002)
  - "Versus" (with Simon Spurrier, in 2000AD #1499, 2006)
  - "Night School" (with John Wagner, in Judge Dredd Megazine #260, 2007)
  - "Mandroid: Instrument of War" (colours, with writer John Wagner and art by Carl Critchlow, in 2000 AD #1555–1566, 2007)
  - "Ratfink" (with John Wagner, in Judge Dredd Megazine #273–277, 2008)
  - "Old Wounds" (with John Smith, in Judge Dredd Megazine #287–288, August–September 2009)
  - "Grudsent" (with Simon Spurrier, in Judge Dredd Megazine #299, July 2010)
- Armitage: "City of the Dead Prologue" (with Dave Stone, in Judge Dredd Megazine #2.63, 1994)
- Grendel Tales: The Devil May Care (with writer Terry LaBan, 6-issue limited series, Dark Horse Comics, 1995, tpb 160 pages, 2003, ISBN 1-56971-796-6)
- The Dreaming #10–12, 17–19 (with Bryan Talbot and Caitlín R. Kiernan, Vertigo, 1997)
- Batman & Superman: World's Finest #6–8 (pencils, with writer Karl Kesel and inks by Robert Campanella, DC Comics, 1997, tpb, 2003, ISBN 1-4012-0082-6)
- Seaguy (colours, with writer Grant Morrison, and art by Cameron Stewart, 3-issue mini-series, Vertigo, 2004, tpb, 2005, ISBN 1-4012-0494-5))
- Breathing Space (with Rob Williams, in 2000AD #1451–1452, 2005)
- Shaolin Cowboy #1–7 (colours, with writer and artist Geof Darrow, Burlyman Entertainment, 2005–2007)
- Devlin Waugh: "Innocence & Experience" (with John Smith, in Judge Dredd Megazine #253–256, 2007)
- Millarworld:
  - MPH #1–4 (colours and letters, with writer Mark Millar, and art by Duncan Fegredo, Image Comics, 2014–2015, ISBN 1-63215-265-7)
  - Empress #1–7 (colours, with writer Mark Millar, and art by Stuart Immonen, Icon Comics, 2016, ISBN 1-302-90206-7)
  - Kingsman: The Red Diamond #1–6 (letters, with writer Rob Williams, and art by Simon Fraser, Image Comics, 2018, ISBN 1-5343-0509-2)
  - Chrononauts: FutureShock #1–4 (letters, with writer Mark Millar, and art by Eric Canete, Image Comics, 2019, ISBN 1-5343-1508-X)

== Awards ==
2005: Nominated for "Best Colorist" Eisner Award, for Shaolin Cowboy
