= Agent Galahad =

Comic book secret agents and spies

- Millarworld character
- First appearance: Gary and Jack London: The Secret Service No. 1 (April 2012); Eggsy Unwin and Harry Hart: Kingsman: The Secret Service (December 2014); Polly Wilkins: The King's Man (December 2021)
- Created by: Gary and Jack London: Mark Millar Dave Gibbons; Eggsy Unwin and Harry Hart: Jane Goldman; Matthew Vaughn; Polly Wilkins: Matthew Vaughn; Karl Gajdusek
- Portrayed by: Colin Firth (Harry); Taron Egerton (Eggsy); Alex Nikolov (young Eggsy); Gemma Arterton (Polly)
- Voiced by: Taron Egerton (Eggsy)

In-universe information
- Full name: Caractacus "Jack" London; Gary "Eggsy" Unwin; Harold "Harry" Hart; Pollyanna "Polly" Wilkins
- Title: Galahad
- Occupation: Secret agents
- Affiliation: Kingsman
- Abilities: Expert marksman; Martial arts training; Eidetic memory; Trained in the "art of seduction"

Agent Galahad is the name of several fictional characters serving as the protagonists of the Kingsman franchise, part of the Millarworld, published by Marvel Comics under the company's imprint Icon Comics, and by Image Comics. The first two Galahads, Gary and Jack London, were created by artist Dave Gibbons and writer Mark Millar for the 2012 comic book miniseries The Secret Service, Jack being a gentleman spy who recruits his nephew Gary to become an agent of MI6; after Jack's death, Gary assumes the Galahad mantle and saves the world. In 2014, these characters were adapted by Jane Goldman and Matthew Vaughn as Gary "Eggsy" Unwin (portrayed by Taron Egerton) and Harold "Harry" Hart (portrayed by Colin Firth) in the feature film Kingsman: The Secret Service, changed in adaptation to be unrelated, with Harry having been a friend of Eggsy's deceased father Lee, recruiting Eggsy to the independent intelligence agency Kingsman; the characters return in the 2017 sequel Kingsman: The Golden Circle, and will return again in the 2020s in Kingsman: The Blue Blood. Due to the success of the Kingsman film series, the comic book mononymous Gary was retconned to also be named Gary "Eggsy" Unwin in the 2017 one-shot The Big Exit, before again returning in the miniseries The Red Diamond (2017–2018) and Big Game (2023), in which he respectively partners up with SASS agent Kwaito and vigilante Mindy McCready.

The 2021 First World War-era prequel film The King's Man introduces the first Agent Galahad, Pollyanna "Polly" Wilkins (portrayed by Gemma Arterton), a founder member of Kingsman and the former maid and romantic partner of Kingsman leader Orlando, created by Matthew Vaughn and Karl Gajdusek.

The characters have received a generally positive critical reception.

== Comic series ==
=== The Secret Service ===
In The Secret Service (2012), Gary is recruited by his uncle, Caractacus "Jack" London, to work for the British Secret Service.

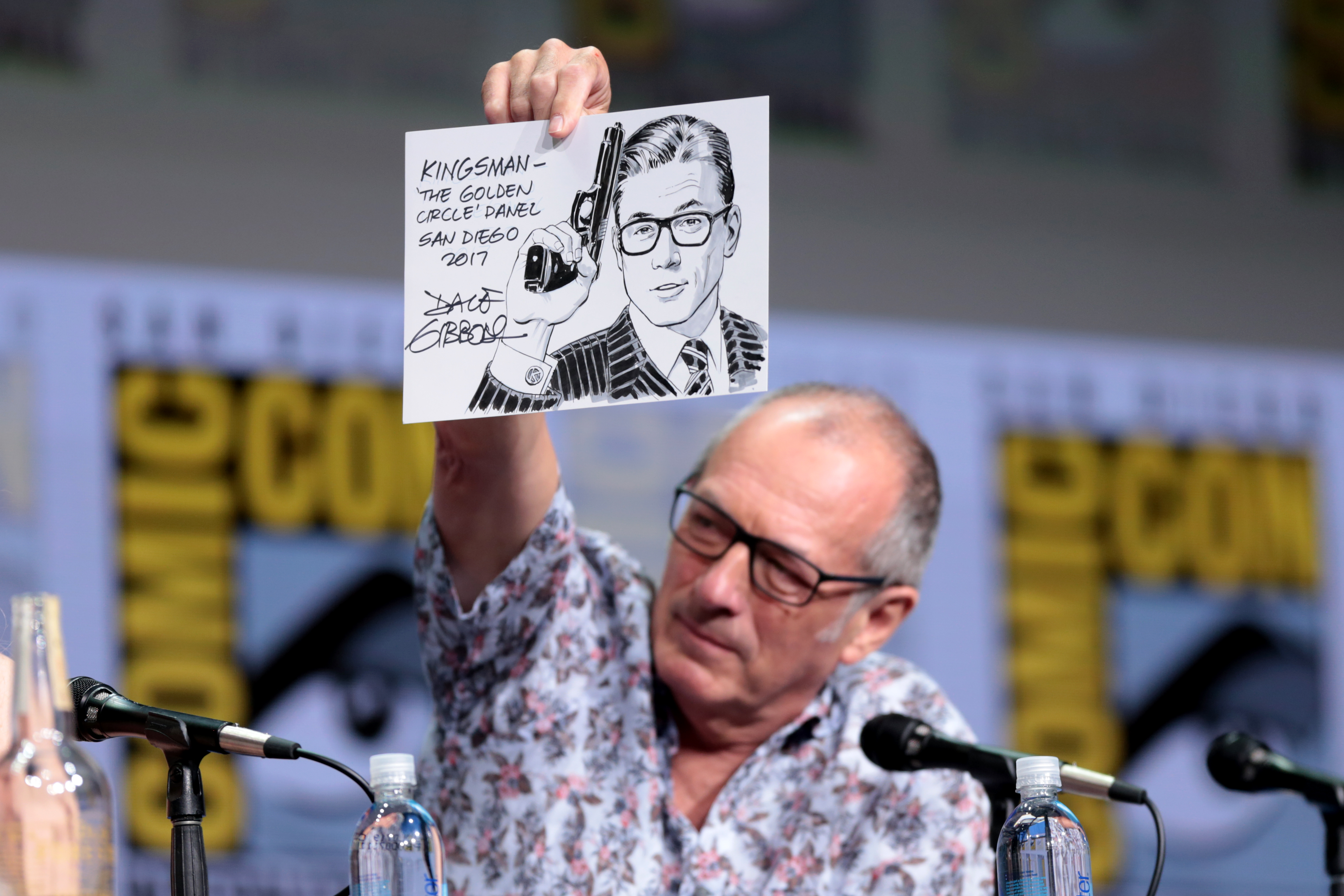
Artist Dave Gibbons holding aloft a signed drawing of Gary "Eggsy" Unwin at San Diego Comic-Con in 2017.

=== Kingsman: The Big Exit ===
In Kingsman: The Big Exit (2017), shortly after Brexit, Gary "Eggsy" Unwin, known as Agent Galahad of the MI6 black ops offshoot Kingsman, is tasked with safeguarding the United Kingdom's controversial "divorce fee" for leaving the European Union on its journey to Brussels.

=== Kingsman: The Red Diamond ===
In Kingsman: The Red Diamond (2017–2018), Eggsy teams up with SASS Agent Kwaito against the Red Diamond, self-made South African mining magnate Jakobis Du Preez.

=== Big Game ===
Eggsy returns in Big Game (2023), where-in he rescues a mid-20s Mindy McCready from assassination at the hands of agents of the Fraternity of Super-Criminals.

== Film series ==
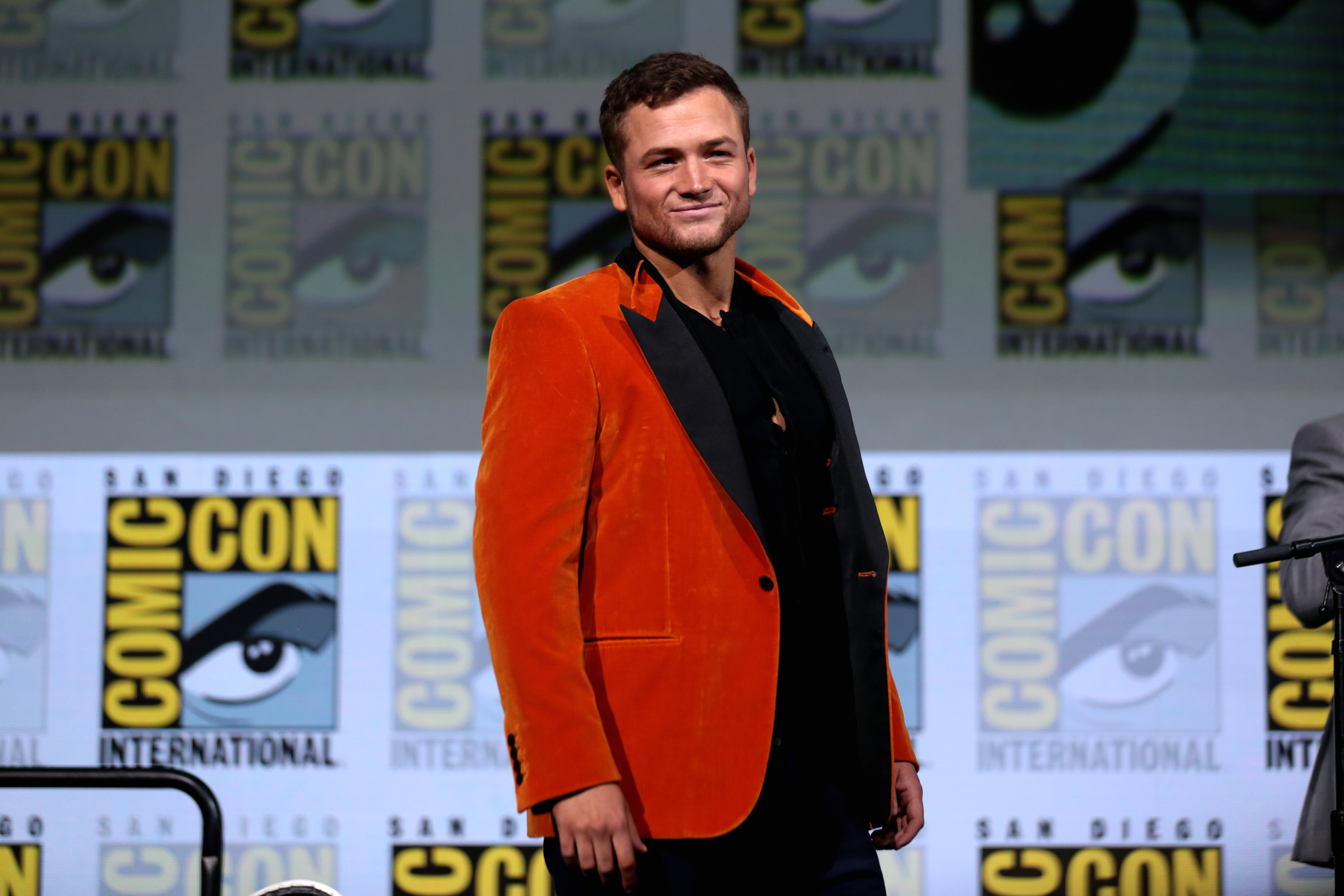
Taron Egerton in-costume as Gary "Eggsy" Unwin at San Diego Comic-Con in 2017.

=== Feature films ===
Harry Hart / Agent Galahad and Gary "Eggsy" Unwin / Agent Galahad appear in the 2014 film adaptation Kingsman: The Secret Service, and the 2017 sequel Kingsman: The Golden Circle, respectively portrayed by Colin Firth and Taron Egerton (and Alex Nikolov, as a child). In February 2019, Gemma Arterton had joined the cast of the First World War-era prequel film The King's Man, playing Polly Wilkins / Agent Galahad.

=== Short film ===
On 20 July 2017, Fox released an animated crossover short film between Kingsman and Archer, titled #TBT to That Time Archer Met Kingsman, featuring Eggsy and Sterling Archer.

=== Future ===
Harry and Eggsy will return in Kingsman: The Blue Blood, described as the "final chapter" of their relationship.

== Video games ==
Harry Hart and Eggsy Unwin appears as playable characters in the 2017 turn-based match-3 role-playing combat game Kingsman: The Golden Circle by NHN PixelCube, and the 2019 hybrid action adventure-construction simulator Kingsman: The Secret Service.

== Merchandise ==
In May 2017, Funko released Pop! Vinyl figures of Harry Hart and Eggsy Unwin.

== Reception ==
Reviewing Kingsman: The Red Diamond, Jesse Schedeen of IGN lauded "Eggsy's quest for legitimacy and happiness, goals that seem no more within his grasp than when he was simply another London punk [and how like] Daniel Craig's James Bond, there's a working class "chip on his shoulder" quality to Eggsy. Unlike Bond, Eggsy has a kind, ordinary humanity to him that makes him a very likable protagonist", further complimenting the overall "more grounded and character-driven approach" to his story as compared to the previous film adaptations' "bombast".

=== Accolades ===
Accolades received by Kingsman: The Secret Service
Award	Date of ceremony	Category	Film	Recipient(s)	Result	Ref.
Empire Awards	29 March 2015	Best Male Newcomer	Kingsman: The Secret Service	Taron Egerton	Won	
Saturn Awards	22 June 2016	Best Actor	Kingsman: The Secret Service	Taron Egerton	Nominated	
Teen Choice Awards	16 August 2015	Choice Movie: Breakout Star	Kingsman: The Secret Service	Taron Egerton	Nominated	
