= Wanted (comics) =

Comic book limited series written by Mark Millar

- Cover of the Wanted trade paperback. Artwork by J. G. Jones

Publication information
- Publisher: Top Cow Productions
- Schedule: Irregular
- Format: Limited series
- Genre: Superhero
- Publication date: December 2003 – February 2005
- No. of issues: 6
- Main character(s): Wesley F. Gibson / The Killer II; The Fox

Creative team
- Written by: Mark Millar
- Artist: J. G. Jones
- Letterers: Dennis Heisler; Mark Roslan; Robin Spehar
- Colorist: Paul Mounts
- Editors: Renae Geerlings; Jim McLauchlin; Scott Tucker

Collected editions
- Hardcover: ISBN 1-58240-480-1
- Softcover: ISBN 1-58240-497-6
- Wanted & Big Game: ISBN 1-5067-4441-9

Wanted is a comic book limited series created by writer Mark Millar and artist J. G. Jones. It was published by Top Cow in 2003 and 2004 as part of Millarworld. It features an amoral protagonist, Wesley F. Gibson, who discovers he is the heir to a career as a supervillain assassin in a world where such villains, The Fraternity, have secretly taken control of the planet and wiped all memories of its heroes (implied to be those of the DC Universe) from it. The Sunday Times dubbed the title "the Watchmen for super-villains".

A film adaptation, very loosely based on the comic, was released in 2008, to which a video game sequel followed in 2009. Three crossover sequel comics, Savage Dragon: Wanted!, Nemesis: Reloaded, and Big Game, were released in 2006 and 2023 by Image Comics, seeing Wesley and the Fraternity crossover with the other Millarworld franchises. In 2024, the series was republished by Dark Horse Comics as Wanted & Big Game.

== Publication history ==
As with Superman: Red Son, Mark Millar has stated that the concept for the series occurred to him when he was a child. In this case, it came to him after his brother told him that there were no superheroes anymore because they had all disappeared after a great war with their respective supervillains.

== Plot ==
Wesley F. Gibson is a loser cubicle rat who is abused by almost everyone in his life, including his boss, a local gang, his unfaithful girlfriend, and his best friend with whom his girlfriend is having an affair. Wesley was raised by his pacifist mother after they were abandoned by his father, causing him to grow up into a wimp. All this changes when he is visited by the Fox, an assassin who shoots everyone in a sandwich shop before revealing herself to be a member of the Fraternity, a powerful organization of supervillains that rules the world. So long as they maintain secrecy, they are able to commit any crime without any consequences. The Fraternity wishes to recruit Wesley to replace his father, a supervillain known as the Killer, who was killed by an unknown assassin.

The Fox introduces Wesley to Professor Solomon Selzer, a brilliant mad scientist and leader of the North and South American chapter of the Fraternity. The Professor helps Wesley realize his powers by provoking him into shooting the wings off flies. The Professor explains that a long time ago, the world (identified offscreen as a variation of the DC Universe) was overrun by both superheroes and supervillains. Tired of being repeatedly defeated and jailed, the supervillains joined together and staged a revolution that Wesley's father was a part of. After a long, bloody war, the superheroes were defeated. Using magic and advanced technology, the newly formed Fraternity was able to erase the world's memories of superheroes and supervillains. All that remained were faint, inaccurate memories, which were the cause of superhero comic books and other media. Many of the surviving heroes now believed themselves to be actors who had played superheroes.

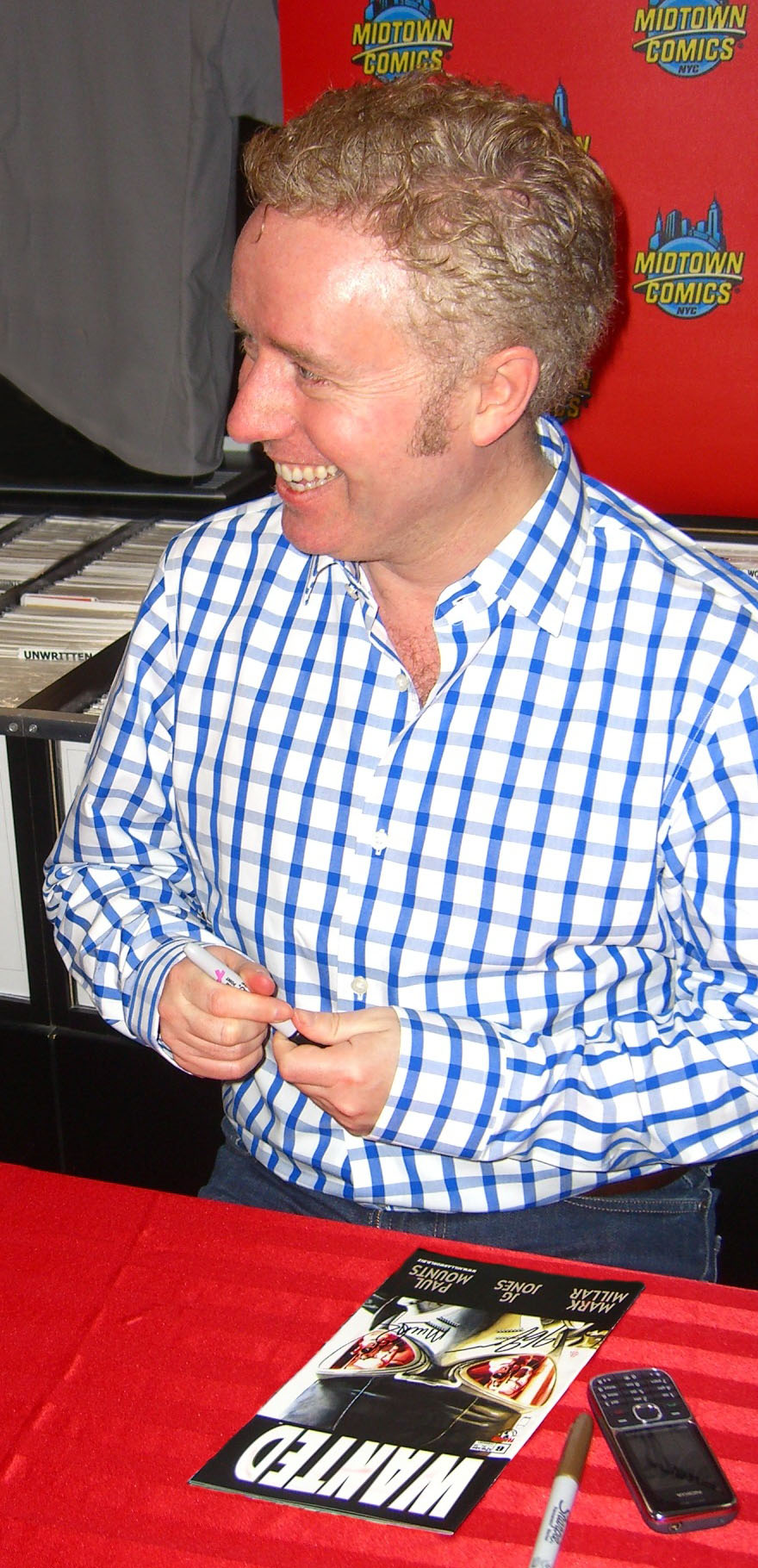
Writer Mark Millar signing a copy of the book during an appearance at Midtown Comics in Manhattan.

The Professor also explains to Wesley that Fox and his father had once worked for Mr. Rictus, who controlled the Australian chapter of the Fraternity. When Rictus visits the Professor's headquarters, Fox implies that she and the Killer left Rictus' chapter because he had been harming children.

The Fraternity begins training Wesley to use his newfound powers. The training focuses on not just his physical skills but on his personality. He is desensitized to violence and eventually learns to enjoy it. He is told to commit random acts of violence before undertaking acts of revenge on anyone who even slightly wronged him. He soon becomes a full-fledged Fraternity member, accompanying them on raids of alternate universes and other missions.

Wesley is assigned to be the Professor's personal bodyguard during a Fraternity convention in which the leaders of the Fraternity's five chapters will meet. The five leaders are the Professor, Mr. Rictus, Adam-One, the Future, and the Emperor. Here, he learns that Rictus and the Future had long wanted to end the Fraternity's policy of secrecy and rule the world openly. The Professor, Adam-One, and the Emperor favored secrecy for supervillains in order to get "the loot without the leg-breaking" and avoid gaining the attention of the larger multiverse, and have always managed to outvote Rictus and the Future. Though it seems that the Emperor is about to switch sides, the Professor subtly manipulates him to vote in favor of secrecy yet again.

After the meeting, the Professor leaves in a limo hoping to pick up a young prostitute. However, his driver is actually being impersonated by Shithead, Rictus's right-hand man, and the Professor is murdered by him. Rictus and Future's factions of the Fraternity begin a revolt against the other three. With most of the Professor's supervillains killed, Wesley and Fox must fight off the rival factions on their own. They manage to kill off many of the rebel supervillains, including the Future. This culminates in an attack on their own headquarters, occupied by Rictus and his gang. Defeating Rictus and deflecting a bullet through his throat, Wesley demands to know who killed his father but Rictus refuses to answer (or is simply unable to) before he dies. A figure steps out of the shadows revealing himself to be Wesley's father, the original Killer. The Killer reveals that he and Fox left Rictus's chapter not because they objected to harming children but because they knew of his planned revolt. The Killer also says that his skills have been deteriorating with age and he does not want to be killed by anyone inferior to him. After Wesley's training, the Killer believes that he is the only one worthy of ending his life and orders Wesley to put a bullet through his head. After shooting his father, Wesley indicates that he wants to return to his former life and stop being a super villain. However, he reveals to Fox shortly after that he was just joking, and they go off to plan another heist. The comic ends with Wesley calling out the audience about their "pathetic" lives, and stating: "This is my face while I'm fucking you in the ass."

== Main characters ==
=== The American fraternity ===
- Wesley F. Gibson/The Killer (II) – Wesley F. Gibson, the protagonist of the series. He is facially designed after Eminem.
- The Fox – Wesley's mentor and lover. According to her, Fox has been a criminal since she was fourteen years old. Her character is based on DC's Catwoman. She is facially modelled after Halle Berry, who would star as Catwoman in 2004.
- The Professor – Solomon Seltzer, mad scientist, has dominion over one fifth of the Earth. A "Level 9" intelligence, the Professor's motivation for crime is to fund his scientific research. Killed by Shithead. His character is based on DC's Lex Luthor.
- The Killer (I) – Hedonist and lover of death. Wesley's father, who fakes his own assassination to set the stage for Wesley to take over his role as The Killer and ultimately end his life for him. Killed by his son, Wesley Gibson. His character is based on DC's Deadshot. He is facially designed after Tommy Lee Jones.
- The Doll-Master – Technological mastermind, specializing in toy-shaped weapons and robotics; will kill innocents but will not swear in front of children. Keeps his criminal career a secret from his family. His character is based on DC's Toyman. He is facially designed after Mark Hamill, whom Millar later wrote into Kingsman.
- Fuckwit – A clone of a superhero. He is extremely strong and able to fly. However, he is deformed, childlike and can only understand a statement that is the opposite of what the speaker intends to say. However, he later begins to show signs of speaking and understanding normally. According to Wanted: Dossier, he is "friendly, loyal, and loves you unconditionally." His character is based on DC's Bizarro.
- Sucker – An extraterrestrial capable of temporarily stealing the powers of other superpowered beings. He betrays the Professor and joins Mr. Rictus' coup. He is killed when his 24-hour limit was drained while flying. His character is based on DC's Parasite.
- Imp – A reality-manipulating creature from a seven-dimensional world. He is thousands of years old but only an infant by the standards of his people, sneaking into the Wanted dimension while his parents are away. Wanted: Dossier states that he once brought buildings to life and made them fight each other and briefly turned America into a marshmallow paradise. Killed by Sucker. His character is based on DC's Mister Mxyzptlk.

=== The Australian fraternity ===
- Mr. Rictus – Rictus is a regular human with severely disfiguring burns, leaving his face locked in a rictus grin. The accident also left him with no moral compass, resulting in criminal insanity that brought him into the elite of the villains' Fraternity. His displeasure over receiving control of Australia when the world was divided, as well as his impatience for acting in secrecy, drives the events of the story. His character is based on DC's Joker.
- Shithead – A creature made of the feces of the 666 most evil people in the world, including Adolf Hitler, Ed Gein and Jeffrey Dahmer. His character is based on DC's Clayface.
- Deadly Nightshade – A plant-manipulator. She is having an affair with Imp, a member of the Fraternity's American chapter. According to Wanted: Dossier, this is extremely dangerous because of tensions between their two chapters as well as the possibility that the Imp might destroy reality in a pleasure-induced loss of control. Her character is based on DC's Poison Ivy.

=== The Council of Five ===
- The Council of Five is made up of the leaders from the five different chapters of the Fraternity. They meet once a year to vote on various issues.
  - The Professor controls North and South America.
  - Adam-One, the world's oldest man, took Africa. He has apparently outlived several of his own children. He supports keeping the Fraternity a secret from the world. His character is based on DC's Vandal Savage. He is facially designed after Mobutu Sese Seko.
  - Mr. Rictus, has Australia.
  - The Future, a savage Nazi time-displaced criminal, got Europe. Hopes to begin a new Holocaust. He is willing to tolerate Asians and Africans so long as he is able to kill Jews. He supports Rictus' idea of going public. Killed by Wesley Gibson. His character is based on DC's Per Degaton, as well as Marvel's Kang the Conqueror.
  - The Emperor (a.k.a. Ching-Sang), a Chinese crime lord, took control of Asia. Supports the Professor but is having doubts. His character is a composite character of Marvel's Mandarin and Ra's al Ghul from DC Comics.

=== Other fraternity members ===
The following characters are fraternity members whose chapter affiliations are not specified.

- The Puzzler – Has a costume designed to resemble a crossword puzzle. His character is based on DC's Riddler.
- Johnny Two-dicks: A cowardly pharmacist with a thirteen-inch sentient penis that is a criminal mastermind. He lacks the courage to defy its orders. Two-dicks joins Rictus' rebellion. His character is based on DC's Scarface and Two-Face.
- The Frightener: A supervillain who creates "psychic viruses". Killed by Wesley Gibson.
- The Avian: A bird-themed supervillain. Wesley's mother was his social worker and the two dated before she met Wesley's father.

== Collected editions ==
The complete limited series, along with the Wanted: Dossier (which includes additional and "behind-the-scenes" material on the series), has been collected in a single volume as both a softcover (ISBN 1-58240-497-6) and a hardcover (ISBN 1-58240-480-1).

On September 26, 2018, the complete series was republished by Image Comics as a single volume as both a softcover (ISBN 978-1-5343-0916-6) and a hardcover (ISBN 978-1-60706-918-8).

On October 1, 2024, the complete series, along with its sequel Big Game, was collected into a single volume as both a softcover (ISBN 978-1-5067-4441-4) and a hardcover (ISBN 1-5067-4441-9) under the title Wanted & Big Game by Dark Horse Comics.

== Follow-ups ==
=== Interquel ===
Issue #128 of Erik Larsen's Image Comics series Savage Dragon in 2006, collected as part of Savage Dragon: Wanted!, serves as a crossover with Wanted, set during the events of Wanted, following Wesley F. Gibson and the Fraternity on one of their invasions of other realities with active superheroes (in this case the Image Universe).

=== Sequel ===
In May 2023, it was revealed that Big Game, a crossover events that united all the Millarworld characters, was actually a sequel to Wanted and followed Wesley F. Gibson and the Fraternity teaming up with Matthew Anderson / Nemesis to take down the latest wave of superheroes (in particular The Ambassadors and The Night Club) that have popped back up in the world following the actions of Dave Lizewski / Kick-Ass. Wesley F. Gibson and the Fraternity also appear in the Millarworld series Nemesis, Nemesis: Reloaded, Nemesis: Rogues' Gallery, and Nemesis: Forever, about Wesley's protégé Nemesis, the former two series preceding Big Game, and the latter two published after it.

== Adaptations ==
=== Film ===
A film very loosely based on the comic was released in June 2008. It was directed by Timur Bekmambetov and starred James McAvoy as Wesley Allan Gibson (his middle name changed from "F."), Angelina Jolie as Fox, and Morgan Freeman as Sloan. The film focuses on a league of self-righteous assassins rather than super-villains. Mark Millar himself hinted at a sequel closer to the plot of the original comic and featuring The Killer's costume.

=== Video games ===
Sweden-based developer Stillfront AB launched a browser game based on Wanted in April 2008. The Wanted "Fan Immersion Game" was a massively multiplayer online role-playing game where players took the roles of Fraternity hitmen, performing assassination missions, upgrading weapons and ammunition, and creating alliances or rivalries with other players.

A video game sequel to the events of the film, Wanted: Weapons of Fate, was released in March 2009. It was developed by GRIN, and published by Warner Bros. Interactive Entertainment for Microsoft Windows, PlayStation 3, and Xbox 360.
