= Big Game (comics) =

Comic book limited series

- Cover of Big Game #4 (October 2023), depicting Mindy McCready on her knees before the throne of King Morax and his T. rex "guard dog". Art by Pepe Larraz.

Publication information
- Publisher: Image Comics; Dark Horse Comics (omnibus)
- Format: Limited series
- Publication date: July – November 2023
- No. of issues: 5
- Main characters: Protagonists: Mindy McCready / Hit-Girl; Gary "Eggsy" Unwin / Agent Galahad; Edison Crane / Prodigy; The Chrononauts; Bobbie Griffin; Dave Lizewski / Kick-Ass / Codename: America; The Ambassadors; The Magic Order; Antagonists: Wesley Gibson / The Killer II; Matthew Anderson / Nemesis

Creative team
- Written by: Mark Millar
- Artist: Pepe Larraz
- Letterer: Clem Robins
- Colorist: Giovanna Niro
- Editor(s): Melina Mikulic; Sarah Unwin

Collected editions
- Big Game: ISBN 978-153439-9112

Big Game is an American superhero comic book limited series written by Mark Millar and drawn by Pepe Larraz. Published by Image Comics, the series is a crossover event between the various properties of the Millarworld multimedia franchise created by Millar, a direct sequel to Wanted by Millar and J. G. Jones, and a prequel to Empress by Millar and Stuart Immonen. The series chronicles Wesley Gibson and his protégé Matthew Anderson / Nemesis' campaign to assassinate the world's new superheroes, as Agent Galahad of Kingsman and Mindy McCready / Hit-Girl take on the forces of Gibson's Fraternity of Super-Criminals. The series, originally published between July and November 2023, was subsequently collected in trade paperback former by Image Comics in December 2023, and as an omnibus with Wanted by Dark Horse Comics in 2024. It was followed by a sequel, Nemesis: Rogues' Gallery, later that year.

== Premise ==
In 1986, a group of villains known as The Fraternity banded together to defeat the heroes of the Earth, while also brainwashing the entire planet into believing that the heroes never existed and were only fictional characters. In 2023, a new generation of heroes have begun to emerge following the actions of Dave Lizewski, who previously served as the hero Kick-Ass, which drives Wesley "The Killer II" Gibson, the new leader of the Fraternity, to gather his forces, as well as his protégé Nemesis, to kill this new generation before a new age of heroes can begin again.

As Edison Crane and the time-travelling Chrononauts are recruited by former hero Bobbie Griffin to face off against Wesley (while Crane is excavating the remnants of a prehistoric galactic empire), Agent Gary "Eggsy" Unwin of the Kingsman rescues vigilante Mindy "Hit-Girl" McCready from Fraternity assassins, and former vigilante Lizewski attempts to join the superhero team the Ambassadors.

== Characters ==
Protagonists

- Mindy McCready / Hit-Girl – A 27-year-old vigilante and assassin who has been waging war on crime since she was 10-years-old, in Kick-Ass – The Dave Lizewski Years, Hit-Girl, and Kick-Ass vs. Hit-Girl.
- Gary "Eggsy" Unwin / Agent Galahad – A secret agent of the MI6 offshoot Kingsman.
- Dr. Edison Crane – A billionaire and the smartest man alive, who often apathetically saves the world.
- The Chrononauts – Dr. Corbin Quinn and Dr. Danny Reilly, the modern inventors of time travel.
- "Bobbie Griffin" – Heavily implied to be Barbara Gordon / Batgirl of the DC Universe, Griffin survived the Fraternity's attack and erasure of its heroes in 1986, and seeks to stop Gibson and the Fraternity from eradicating this new generation of heroes.
- Dave Lizewski – A 31-year-old security guard and former police officer who was the vigilante Kick-Ass before retiring fifteen years earlier, who now aims to join the Ambassadors as "Codename: America".

Antagonists

- Wesley Gibson / The Killer II – Nemesis' mentor, the Secret Lord of Earth and leader of the Fraternity of Super-Criminals, who aims to wipe out the world's new superheroes as his father had once done in 1986.
- Matthew Anderson / Nemesis – Wesley's protégé and intended successor, an orphan groomed to become a supervillain.
- The Fox – An assassin and Wesley's wife, who was also his father's lover.
- King Morax – The emperor of the galactic empire ruling prehistoric Earth, who aims to invade the future on learning of his empire's eventual end.
- Diabolos the Sorcerer – A techno-sorcerer and the newest chief lieutenant of the royal empire of King Morax, who invades the future on his behalf.

Other

- The Ambassadors – A superhero team who recruit one person from each country as their "ambassadors", granting them artificial superpowers.
- The Magic Order – A secret group of five families of wizards entrusted to keep the world safe from supernatural and magical threats.
  - Cordelia Moonstone – The heir to the Magic Order, frustrated by her inability to stop the Fraternity due to them not being a magical threat.
- The Night Club – A superhero team consisting of teenage vampires who wear masks to fight crime during the day.
- Huck – A kind-hearted superpowered countryman with an IQ of 75 who is able to "track down anything".
- Captain Duke McQueen – An elderly former space hero who once saved the universe.
- Simon Pooni – A teenager with multiple sclerosis who uses a wheelchair and previously sold his soul to transform into the superhero Superior.
- Valerie "Val" Lizewski – Dave's wife, who is deaf in one ear as a result of childhood polio.
- Bonnie Black – The white-clad saviour of Adystria and protector of the afterlife.

== Development ==
In August 2014, following the conclusion of Book Four of Kick-Ass – The Dave Lizewski Years, Mark Millar revealed that the majority of his Millarworld work were set in the same shared fictional universe, with the ending monologue of the series seeing Dave Lizewski make mention of the events of Wanted, Nemesis, Kingsman, and MPH, and Simon Pooni from Superior cameoing, with Millar intended to one day write a crossover between the projects. By March 2015, Millar expressed interest in seeing this concept realised in a Hit-Girl/Kingsman feature film starring Mindy McCready / Hit-Girl and Gary "Eggsy" Unwin (originally London) together "in a big international adventure", by September 2017 revealing that he had discussed this concept with Matthew Vaughn. Following extensive development hell, the crossover, Big Game, was announced in May 2023, written by Millar, illustrated by Pepe Larraz, and serving as a direct sequel to Wanted. The story pits that series' protagonist, Wesley Gibson and his protégé Nemesis against the heroes of the Millarworld, in particular Hit-Girl and Eggsy, spinning-out of the events of Nemesis: Reloaded, and leading into the events of Nemesis: Rogues' Gallery.

== Reception ==
Issue #	Publication date	Critic rating	Critic reviews	Ref.
1	July 2023	9.4/10	4	
2	August 2023	8.8/10	6	
3	September 2023	9.5/10	4	
4	October 2023	9.6/10	4	
5	November 2023	9.9/10	2	
Overall		9.4/10	20	
