= Olivier Coipel =

French comic book artist

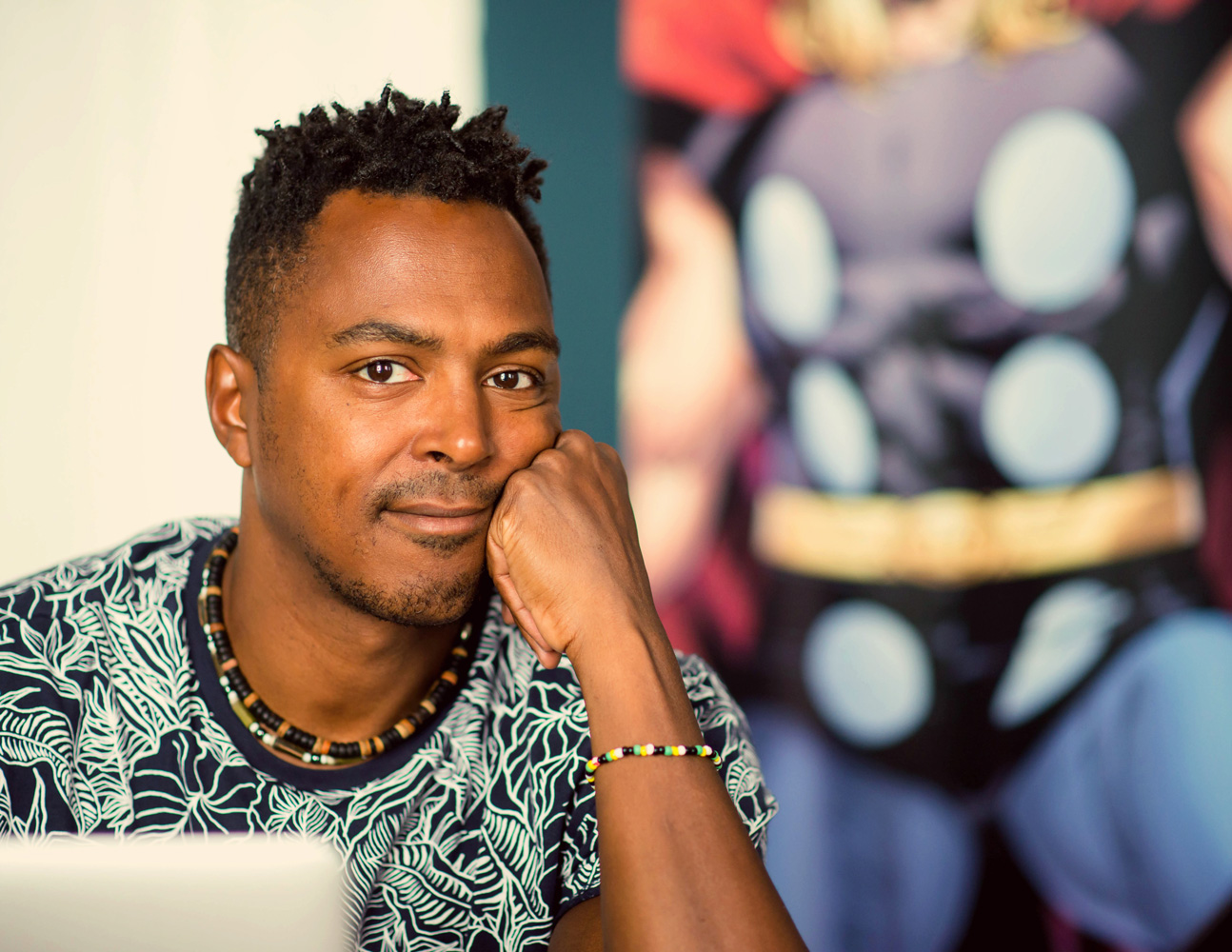
- Coipel in Lisbon 2017
- Area: Artist
- Notable works: Legion of Super-Heroes; House of M Thor; The Ambassadors

Olivier Coipel (French: [kwapɛl]; November 7, 1969) is a French comic book artist, known for his work on books such as House of M, Legion of Super-Heroes, Thor, and the magic order

== Career ==
Olivier Coipel started as a movie animator, working as an assistant on Balto and then The Prince of Egypt, then as a full animator at The Road to El Dorado.

Among his influences are Arthur Adams.And Travis charest.travis charest

Coipel came to prominence and significant controversy as the artist of the American DC Comics book Legion of Super-Heroes during the tenure of writers Dan Abnett and Andy Lanning, beginning with the "Legion of the Damned" story arc.

Coipel signed an exclusive contract with Marvel Comics in January 2005. He was named in August 2005 as one of Marvel's "Young Guns," a group of artists that included Jim Cheung, David Finch, Trevor Hairsine, Adi Granov, and Steve McNiven, which according to Marvel Editor-in-Chief Joe Quesada, exhibited the qualities that make "a future superstar penciller."

One of Coipel's first major works at Marvel was House of M, an eight-issue New Avengers/X-Men crossover limited series with writer Brian Michael Bendis. Coipel was then announced as artist on a new Thor ongoing series that launched in July 2007 with writer J. Michael Straczynski. The title was nominated for an Eisner in 2009 in the category for Best Continuing Series. Coipel left the title in 2009 when it was announced Straczynski would be leaving. Coipel re-teamed with Bendis for the four-issue 2009 Marvel Comics event series Siege. In 2010, he provided art for a Magneto-focused backup story leading into the Young Avengers miniseries Avengers: the Children's Crusade, before returning to Thor in 2011, illustrating the first arc on Matt Fraction's The Mighty Thor.

On April 9, 2011 Coipel was one of 62 comics creators who appeared at the IGN stage at the Kapow! convention in London to set two Guinness World Records, the Fastest Production of a Comic Book, and Most Contributors to a Comic Book. With Guinness officials on hand to monitor their progress, writer Mark Millar began work at 9 am scripting a 20-page black and white Superior comic book, with Coipel and the other artists appearing on stage throughout the day to work on the pencils, inks, and lettering, including Dave Gibbons, Frank Quitely, John Romita Jr., Jock, Doug Braithwaite, Ian Churchill, Duncan Fegredo, Simon Furman, David Lafuente, John McCrea, Sean Phillips and Liam Sharp, who all drew a panel each, with regular Superior artist Leinil Yu creating the book's front cover. The book was completed in 11 hours, 19 minutes, and 38 seconds, and was published through Icon on November 23, 2011, with all royalties being donated to Yorkhill Children's Foundation. In 2012, Coipel penciled issues #6–7 and #11 of the Marvel crossover miniseries Avengers vs. X-Men. Coipel drew issues 9–11 and 14 of The Amazing Spider-Man, which were published in 2014.

In November 2016 Coipel and writer Jason Aaron started the series The Unworthy Thor. The series follows the original Thor, who now refers to himself as Odinson, as he tries to find his purpose after relinquishing his name and title to Foster.

== Bibliography ==
Illustration by Olivier Coipel during the "House of M" storyline that ran in the X-Men books.

=== Interior work ===
==== Marvel Comics ====
- The Amazing Spider-Man #9–11, 14 (2014)
- Avengers #65-70, 77-78, 80-81
- Avengers vs. X-Men #6–7,11
- Civil War II #0
- House of M #1–8
- Marvel Spotlight: Daniel Way/Olivier Coipel
- Marvel 1985 #2 (Marvel, 2008)
- Siege #1–4
- Stan Lee Meets Spider-Man #1 (Lead Story)
- The Mighty Thor (Vol. 1) #1–6
- New Avengers #23
- New Avengers Annual #1
- Thor (Vol. 3) #1–6, 9–12
- Thor (Vol. 1) #600
- Thor (Vol. 6) #24
- Uncanny Avengers #5
- Unworthy Thor #1–5 (with various other artists)
- Uncanny X-Men #448-449
- X-Men (Vol. 4) #1–3
- Young Guns Sketchbook 2004

==== DC Comics ====
- Action Comics #1000
- Batman Black and White #3 (8 pages)
- I Am Batman #1
- Legion of Super-Heroes #122-123
- The Legion #1–4, 6–8, 10-12, 14
- Legionnaires #79-80
- Legion Worlds #1 (backup)
- Legion Lost #1–3, 5, 7–8, 10-12

==== Image Comics ====
- The Magic Order #1–6 (2018-2019)
- The Ambassadors #4 (2023)

=== Cover work ===
- Black Panther #16 (Marvel, 2004–2005)
- Batman: Lost #1 (DC, 2017)
- Darth Vader #3 (Marvel, 2017)
- Han Solo #4 (Variant cover only, Marvel, 2016)
- Hulk #5 (Variant cover only, Marvel, 2008)
- New Avengers annual (Variant cover only),
- The Legion #1–4, 5, 6–8, 9, 10-12, 13
- Legion Lost #10-12
- Legion of Super Heroes vol. 4 #122-123, 125
- Survive! #1 (Marvel, 2014)
- Thor: Tales Of Asgard #1–6 (Marvel, 2009)
- Ultimate Comics Spider-Man #155 (Marvel, 2004–2005)
- Ultimate X-Men #61 (Variant cover only, Marvel)
- What If? X-Men #1 (Marvel, 2007)
- Wolverine: Weapon X #1 (Variant cover only, Marvel, 2009)
- X-Men #1 (Variant cover only, Marvel, 2010)
- Avengers vs. X-Men #6 (Variant cover only, Marvel, 2012)
- The Eternals#1 (Variant cover only, Marvel, 2012)
- The Amazing Spider-Man #700 (Variant cover only, Marvel, 2012)
- Thor God Of Thunder #4 (Variant cover only, Marvel, 2012)
- Superior Spider-Man #17 (Variant cover only, Marvel, 2014)
- Black Widow #18 (Variant cover only, Marvel, 2016)
- Civil War II #2 (Variant cover only, Marvel, 2016)
- Spidey #2 (Variant cover only, Marvel, 2017)
- Sacred Creatures #5 (Variant cover only, Image, 2017)
- Batman #33,37,41-42 (Variant cover only, DC, 2017)
- Kick-Ass Vol 4 #1 (Variant cover only, Marvel, 2018)
- Uncanny X-Men #600 (Variant cover only, Marvel, 2018)
- Invincible Iron Man #600 (Variant cover only, Marvel, 2018)
- The Rise Of Ultraman #1 (Variant cover only, Marvel,2020)
