= Kingsman (franchise) =

British action media franchise

- Official franchise logo
- Created by: Mark Millar; Matthew Vaughn; Dave Gibbons
- Original work: Kingsman
- Owners: Millarworld (comics); 20th Century Studios (Kingsman film series); Apple Studios (Argylle)
- Years: 2012–present (comics); 2014–present (films)

Print publications
- Comics: The Secret Service (2012–13); Mum's the Word (2016); The Big Exit (2017); The Red Diamond (2017–18); Big Game (2023)

Films and television
- Films: The Secret Service (2014); The Golden Circle (2017); The King's Man (2021)
- Short film: TBT: That Time Archer Met Kingsman (2017)

Games
- Video games: The Secret Service (2014); The Golden Circle (2017)

Audio
- Soundtracks: The Secret Service; The Golden Circle; The King's Man

Kingsman is a British multimedia franchise consisting of spy comic books, films, and video games that follow the missions of Agent Galahad of Kingsman, a fictional secret service organisation. The franchise is based on the comic book series created by Mark Millar and Dave Gibbons, a 2012 Marvel Comics release set in the Millarworld shared universe which is based on a concept by Millar and Matthew Vaughn. It has garnered success both financially and critically.

Kingsman: The Secret Service, the film, is directed by Vaughn from a script that he co-wrote with Jane Goldman, starring Colin Firth and Taron Egerton. It was released in February 2015. The sequel Kingsman: The Golden Circle and the comic book Kingsman: The Red Diamond were both released in September 2017. The prequel film The King's Man was released in December 2021 starring Ralph Fiennes. The crossover comic Big Game was published in July 2023. The films were released by 20th Century Studios, while The Red Diamond and Big Game were published by Image Comics. The spin-off film Argylle was released in February 2024 by Universal Pictures and Apple Original Films, directed by Vaughn, and co-starring Henry Cavill as Agent Argylle of Kingsman.

Adaptations of the films have been published, and a handful of Kingsman video games have been released since 2012, although they are unavailable in the UK.

== Origin ==
The Kingsman film franchise is based on the comic book series of the same name, which began with the 2012 comic book The Secret Service. Three sequels, Mum's the Word, The Big Exit and The Red Diamond, followed from 2016 to 2018. The series was initially known as The Secret Service before being rebranded after the first Kingsman film's release. (Note: In newer collected editions of the first volume of the series, the book The Secret Service was renamed after the film adaption Kingsman: The Secret Service and all references to MI6 were replaced by "Kingsman".) The series was created by Mark Millar and Dave Gibbons. It is set in Millar's shared universe, the "Millarworld", first displayed when the celebrity kidnappings that take place in Kingsman Vol. 1 are referenced in Kick Ass: The Dave Lizewski Years Book Four, culminating in the 2023 series Big Game, featuring Gary "Eggsy" Unwin aiming to prevent Mindy McCready / Hit-Girl (from Hit-Girl & Kick-Ass) from being assassinated by the Fraternity, led by Wesley Gibson (from Wanted).

== Feature films ==
| Film | Release date | Director | Screenwriter(s) | Story by | Producers |
Original series
| Kingsman: The Secret Service | 29 January 2015 | Matthew Vaughn | Jane Goldman & Matthew Vaughn | Jane Goldman & Matthew Vaughn | David Reid, Adam Bohling & Matthew Vaughn |
| Kingsman: The Golden Circle | 20 September 2017 | Matthew Vaughn | Jane Goldman & Matthew Vaughn | Jane Goldman & Matthew Vaughn | David Reid, Adam Bohling & Matthew Vaughn |
Prequel film
| The King's Man | 26 December 2021 | Matthew Vaughn | Karl Gajdusek & Matthew Vaughn | Matthew Vaughn | David Reid, Adam Bohling & Matthew Vaughn |
Spin-off film
| Argylle | 1 February 2024 | Matthew Vaughn | Jason Fuchs | Matthew Vaughn | David Reid, Jason Fuchs, Adam Bohling & Matthew Vaughn |

=== Original films ===
==== Kingsman: The Secret Service (2014) ====
The first film, Kingsman: The Secret Service, is set over the course of two years, from 2014 to 2015. Having dropped out of training for the Royal Marines, becoming a stereotypical chav and being arrested for stealing a car, Gary "Eggsy" Unwin's release is arranged by Harry Hart, a Kingsman and his late father's colleague. Hart, a veteran spy of the secret organisation Kingsman, recruits Eggsy into the agency's competitive training programme as a global threat emerges from a billionaire, Richmond Valentine.

The concept of an adaptation of The Secret Service originated when Millar and Vaughn were at a bar discussing spy movies, lamenting that the genre had become too serious and deciding to do "a fun one." To have the time to make the film, Vaughn had to opt out of directing X-Men: Days of Future Past, which he called "a really tough decision". He reasoned that if he did not do it, "somebody else ... [would] wake up and do a fun spy movie. Then I would have written a bloody screenplay that no one would want to make." Colin Firth joined the cast to lead the film on 29 April 2013. It was initially reported in 2013 that Leonardo DiCaprio was in talks to play a villain, but Vaughn denied that he was ever considered. Instead the role went to Samuel L. Jackson. Jackson took the role in part because of a careerlong dream to be in a James Bond movie. He felt that this was unlikely to come true and said, "I felt like this was an opportunity to play a really great Bond villain." Jackson's character has a notable lisp, a choice he decided to make based partially on the stutter he had as a kid. In September 2013, Vaughn cast Sophie Cookson as the female lead, preferring a newcomer over more obvious candidates like Emma Watson and Bella Heathcote. Mark Hamill was cast as Professor James Arnold, a reference to his character in the source comic book being himself.

Principal photography began 6 October 2013 in Deepcut, Surrey, on a budget reported to be one-third of the $200 million budget of Skyfall. The Alexandra Road Estate in Camden was used for Eggsy's home area, and some scenes were filmed at Imperial College London. The Black Prince Pub in Kennington, South London, was used for various fight scenes and the car chase. Savile Row in Mayfair was also employed as a location and the exterior of tailors Huntsman, which provided the clothes, and James Lock & Co. in St James's, which provided the hats. Elton John was rumoured to have a role in the film. Although this would prove untrue, John did appear in the film's sequel. Kingsman: The Secret Service was released in the United Kingdom on 29 January 2015.

==== Kingsman: The Golden Circle (2017) ====
The second film, Kingsman: The Golden Circle (2017) is set over the course of one week. When Kingsman's headquarters are destroyed, their agents discover an allied spy organisation in the United States, the Statesman. The two join forces to defeat a common enemy to save the world.

Near the release of Kingsman: The Secret Service, Millar and Vaughn said a sequel was possible if the first film performed well at the box office, and Vaughn expressed interest in directing the sequel. Vaughn also noted that he had hoped to have Firth in the sequel, but it was later reported that Firth would not be returning.

On 29 April 2015, Fox announced that a sequel was in production, but that it was unclear if Vaughn would direct due to his interest in directing a Flash Gordon film. On 11 June 2015, Vaughn told Yahoo that he had begun writing the sequel's script and that he might direct. In September 2015, Millar reiterated that the sequel was in development and that Vaughn was looking for ways to bring Firth back without sacrificing the story's integrity. Later that month, The Hollywood Reporter confirmed that Egerton had also signed on for the Robin Hood: Origins franchise, which would begin shooting in February 2016; Egerton's schedule was accordingly in conflict with the Kingsman sequel. But in mid-October it was confirmed that the scheduling issues had been settled between both studios. Lionsgate planned to begin Robin Hood's production right after Egerton wrapped filming on Kingsman: The Golden Circle, which was expected to begin production in April 2016.

On 17 February 2016, it was revealed that Julianne Moore was in negotiations to play the film's villain. On 10 March 2016, Halle Berry was cast as the head of the CIA. Her role later turned out as that of Statesman's tech support. In late March, Vaughn confirmed Berry's and Moore's casting, as well as the title, Kingsman: The Golden Circle. On 8 April 2016, Pedro Pascal was cast as Jack Daniels. The same day, a promotional poster was released featuring Firth's character's glasses, confirming his return; Firth's return was officially confirmed on 11 July 2016. Channing Tatum confirmed his casting on his Twitter account, while Variety confirmed that Elton John was in talks for a role. In late April, Vaughn said of the sequel, "writing this was the hardest thing I've ever done." Jeff Bridges was added to the cast on 28 May 2016.

Principal photography on the film began on 15 May 2016 in Birmingham. Filming also took place in Warner Bros. Studios, Leavesden. On 13 September 2016, Kingsman: The Golden Circle completed initial filming. Additional footage was shot in London in December 2016.

Kingsman: The Golden Circle was originally scheduled for release on 16 June 2017, by 20th Century Fox, but was pushed back to 6 October. Then it was pushed up from 6 October to 22 September. The film was given an IMAX release. It eventually opened in the UK on 20 September.

=== Prequel film ===
==== The King's Man (2021) ====
In June 2018, Vaughn announced that a prequel film was in active development, stating that the plot would take place during the early 1900s and depict the formation of the spy agency, and that the project would be filmed back-to-back with "the third regular Kingsman film". In September 2018, it was announced that Ralph Fiennes and Harris Dickinson would star in the prequel. In October 2018, it was rumored that Rachel Weisz and Brad Pitt were being considered for roles in the film. In November 2018, it was revealed that Daniel Brühl, Charles Dance, Rhys Ifans, and Matthew Goode would co-star in the film. The film would reportedly be a period drama stylistically, and will explore the formation of the Kingsman tailors and agency, with the tagline for the film being "The man who would be Kingsman." In June 2019, the film's official title was announced to be The King's Man.

The King's Man was released on 22 December 2021 by 20th Century Studios. The film was originally slated for a November 2019 release but was delayed eight times due to production issues and the impact of the COVID-19 pandemic.

=== Spin-offs and crossover ===
==== Argylle (2024) ====
On 2 February 2024, Argylle, starring Bryce Dallas Howard, Henry Cavill, John Cena, Sam Rockwell, Samuel L. Jackson, and Bryan Cranston, was released. The film's plot centres on the reclusive spy novelist Elly Conway, portrayed by Howard, who is drawn into the world of spies and espionage after she realises that a new spy novel she is writing mirrors real-world events. Elly Conway happens to be part of the Kingsman universe.

== Short film ==
=== TBT: That Time Archer Met Kingsman (2017) ===
On 20 July 2017, Fox released an animated crossover short film between Kingsman and Archer, titled TBT: That Time Archer Met Kingsman, featuring Gary "Eggsy" Unwin and Sterling Archer. The short was unveiled at the 2017 Comic-Con's Kingsman: The Golden Circle panel in Hall H, following Eggsy as he discovers Archer to have stumbled into the Kingsman's secret arsenal hidden in the bespoke suit shop, helping himself to guns and alcohol. Fighting to reclaim the goods, Eggsy challenges Archer to "the most gentlemanly of competitions": a drinking contest, while planning to drug him via a glass; Archer instead drinks the bottle and passes out. Eggsy, insulted by Archer's behaviour, vows to go to America and "teach them a lesson". H. Jon Benjamin reprises his role as Sterling Archer.

== Main cast and characters ==
List indicators

This section includes characters who will appear or have appeared in the series.

- An empty grey cell indicates the character was not in the film, or that the character's official presence has not yet been confirmed.
- ^{A} indicates an appearance through archival footage or audio.
- ^{C} indicates a cameo role.
- ^{V} indicates a voice-only role.
- ^{Y} indicates a younger version of the character.

| Characters | Films | | | | Short film |
| Characters | Original series | | Prequel film | Spin-off film | Short film |
| Characters | Kingsman: The Secret Service | Kingsman: The Golden Circle | The King's Man | Argylle | TBT: That Time Archer Met Kingsman |
| Characters | 2014 | 2017 | 2021 | 2024 | 2017 |
|---|---|---|---|---|---|
| Harry Hart Galahad | Colin Firth | Colin Firth | | | |
| His Royal Highness Gary "Eggsy" Unwin of Sweden Galahad | Taron Egerton Alex Nikolov^{Y} | Taron Egerton | | | Taron Egerton^{V} |
| Crown Princess Her Royal Highness Tilde of Sweden | Hanna Alström | Hanna Alström | | | |
| His Grace the Duke of Oxford, Orlando Arthur | Paintings | Paintings | Ralph Fiennes | | |
| Archie Reid Lancelot | Paintings | Paintings | Aaron Taylor-Johnson | | |
| Pollyanna "Polly" Wilkins Galahad | Paintings | Paintings | Gemma Arterton | | |
| His Majesty George V of the United Kingdom Percival | Paintings | Paintings | Tom Hollander | | |
| United States Ambassador to Britain Bedivere | Paintings | Paintings | Stanley Tucci | | |
| President of the United States of America | Uncredited actor (as Barack Obama) | Bruce Greenwood | Ian Kelly (as Woodrow Wilson) | | |
| United States Embassy Secretary | | | Pippa Winslow | | |
| Chester King Arthur | Michael Caine | | | | |
| Roxanne "Roxy" Morton Lancelot | Sophie Cookson | Sophie Cookson | | | |
| Hamish Mycroft Merlin | Mark Strong | Mark Strong | | | |
| Charles "Charlie" Hesketh | Edward Holcroft | Edward Holcroft | | | |
| Liam | Thomas Turgoose | Thomas Turgoose | | | |
| Jamal | Tobi Bakare | Tobi Bakare | | | |
| Michelle Unwin | Samantha Womack | Samantha Womack^{C} | | | |
| Richmond Valentine | Samuel L. Jackson | Samuel L. Jackson^{A} | | | |
| Gazelle | Sofia Boutella | Sofia Boutella^{A} | | | |
| Prime Minister of Sweden Morten Lindström | Bjørn Floberg | Bjørn Floberg^{A} | | | |
| Leslie "Lee" Unwin | Jonno Davies | | | | |
| Professor James Arnold | Mark Hamill | | | | |
| James Spencer Lancelot | Jack Davenport | | | | |
| Elton John | | Himself | | | |
| Agent Tequila | | Channing Tatum | | | |
| Ginger Ale Agent Whiskey | | Halle Berry | | | |
| Champ Champagne | | Jeff Bridges | | | |
| Jack Daniels Agent Whiskey | | Pedro Pascal | | | |
| Poppy Adams | | Julianne Moore | | | |
| Sir Giles Arthur | | Michael Gambon | | | |
| Clara Von Gluckfberg | | Poppy Delevingne | | | |
| Conrad Oxford | Mentioned | | Harris Dickinson Alexander Shaw^{Y} | | |
| Herbert Kitchener, 1st Earl Kitchener | | | Charles Dance | | |
| Adolf Hitler | | | David Kross | | |
| Grigori Rasputin | | | Rhys Ifans | | |
| Captain Maximilian "Max" Morton The Shepherd | | | Matthew Goode | | |
| Kaiser Wilhelm II of Prussia/Emperor Nicholas II of Russia | | | Tom Hollander | | |
| Shola Merlin | | | Djimon Hounsou | | |
| Gavrilo Princip | | | Joel Basman | | |
| Mata Hari | | | Valerie Pachner | | |
| Erik Jan Hanussen The Shepherd | | | Daniel Brühl | | |
| Vladimir Lenin | | | August Diehl | | |
| Sterling Malory Archer Duchess | | | | | H. Jon Benjamin^{V} |
| Agent Aubrey Argylle | | | | Henry Cavill Louis Partridge^{Y} | |
| Agent Rachel Kylle Elly Conway | | | | Bryce Dallas Howard | |
| Aidan Wilde | | | | Sam Rockwell | |
| Director Ritter Barry Conway | | | | Bryan Cranston | |
| Dr. Magaret Vogeler Ruth Conway | | | | Catherine O'Hara | |
| Saba Al-Badr | | | | Sofia Boutella | |
| LaGrange | | | | Dua Lipa | |
| Keira | | | | Ariana DeBose | |
| Wyatt | | | | John Cena | |
| Alfie Solomon | | | | Samuel L. Jackson | |
| Deputy Director Powell | | | | Rob Delaney | |
| Li Na | | | | Jing Lusi | |
| Agent Carlos | | | | Tomás Paredes | |
| The Bertender Kingsman Spy | | | | Ben Daniels^{C} | |
| Director Fowler | | | | Richard E. Grant^{C} | |

== Additional crew and production details ==
| Film | Credit | | | | | |
| Film | Composers | Cinematographer | Editor(s) | Production companies | Distributor | Running time |
|---|---|---|---|---|---|---|
| Kingsman: The Secret Service | Henry Jackman & Matthew Margeson | George Richmond | Jon Harris & Eddie Hamilton | Marv Films, 20th Century Fox, Cloudy Productions | 20th Century Fox | 129 minutes |
| Kingsman: The Golden Circle | Henry Jackman & Matthew Margeson | George Richmond | Eddie Hamilton | Marv Films, 20th Century Fox, Shangri-La Entertainment | 20th Century Fox | 141 minutes |
| The King's Man | Dominic Lewis & Matthew Margeson | Ben Davis | Jason Ballantine | Marv Studios, 20th Century Studios, Cloudy Productions | 20th Century Studios | 131 minutes |
| Argylle | Lorne Balfe | George Richmond | Lee Smith, Tom Harrison-Read & Col Goudie | Apple Original Films, Marv Studios, Cloudy Productions | Universal Pictures | 139 minutes |

== Production ==
=== Development ===
The first film – Kingsman: The Secret Service originated when Mark Millar and Matthew Vaughn were at a bar discussing spy movies, lamenting that the genre had become too serious over the years and deciding to do "a fun one". To have the time to make the film, Vaughn had to opt out of directing X-Men: Days of Future Past, which he called "a really tough decision". He reasoned that if he did not do it, "somebody else... [would] wake up and do a fun spy movie. Then I would have written a bloody screenplay that no one would want to make." Colin Firth joined the cast to lead the film on 29 April 2013. It was initially reported in 2013 that Leonardo DiCaprio was in talks to play a villain, although Vaughn himself later denied that he was ever considered, stating that he came as close to playing the role "as I am to becoming the Pope". Instead the role of the villain went to Samuel L. Jackson. Jackson took the role in part because of a career-long dream to be in a James Bond movie. As he felt that this was unlikely to come true, he took on the role, stating "I felt like this was an opportunity to play a really great Bond villain". Jackson's character has a notable lisp, which was partially inspired by the stutter he had during his childhood. In September 2013, Vaughn cast Sophie Cookson for the female lead, preferring a newcomer over more obvious candidates like Emma Watson and Bella Heathcote. Mark Hamill was cast as Professor James Arnold, a reference to his character in the source comic book being named "Mark Hamill".

Millar and Vaughn stated that a sequel was possible if the first film performs well at the box office, and Vaughn expressed interest in directing the sequel. Vaughn also noted that he hoped to have Firth back in the sequel, and that Strong was interested in returning as well. It was confirmed that Taron Egerton was contracted for the sequel. When asked how they would incorporate Firth's character into the sequel, Millar stated that various ideas have been discussed, including giving Harry Hart an evil brother, or perhaps turning the character into a ghost. Fox later announced a sequel was in the works, but it was unclear if Vaughn would return to direct. On 11 June 2015, it was confirmed Vaughn had begun writing the sequel, and that he might return to direct it. Principal photography was set to begin in April 2016, with a 6 October 2017 release date. It was reported that Julianne Moore was in talks to star as the new villain, and Halle Berry might sign on as the Head of the CIA. On 18 March 2016, Edward Holcroft was also confirmed to reprise his role as Charles "Charlie" Hesketh. Vaughn later revealed the sequel's title to be Kingsman: The Golden Circle. The plot follows Eggsy and Merlin joining forces with "Statesman", their American counterpart after Kingsman was destroyed by the film's villain Poppy, played by Moore. On 7 April 2016, Egerton revealed the first poster for the film, which strongly hinted that Firth would return for the film; the poster features Harry Hart's trademark pair of glasses with one of the lenses missing below the tagline (a borrowed quote from Mark Twain) stating "reports of my death have been greatly exaggerated". Sophie Cookson will also reprise her role as Roxy Morton in the sequel. The next day, Deadline reported that Pedro Pascal was in talks for the role of Jack Daniels. On 12 April 2016, Elton John was in talks about joining the cast of the upcoming sequel. The next day, Channing Tatum announced on his Twitter account that he was joining the cast as Agent Tequila.

A prequel to the franchise titled The King's Man was released on 22 December 2021. In June 2018, Vaughn announced that the prequel film would be titled Kingsman: The Great Game and stated that the plot would take place during the early 1900s and would depict the formation of the spy agency and would be filmed back-to-back with "the third regular Kingsman film". On 9 November 2018, Egerton confirmed he would not return for the prequel, however, he would still portray the character in future installments. It was originally scheduled to be released on 8 November 2019, but delayed eight times through 2020 and 2021 due to production issues and the impact of the COVID-19 pandemic. Matthew Vaughn stated that if a sequel were to be developed he would like to see the story about the first decade of the Kingsman agency with all characters that audience see at the end. According to the Hollywood Reporter, he said:

It's more if the public demands it. So the second The King's Man is nearly ready to go. Seeing Ralph [Fiennes] and Aaron [Taylor-Johnson] on a mission together with Polly (Gemma Arterton) and Shola (Djimon Hounsou)? I'm in! Those four together? Let's go! I think it would be great.

Kingsman: The Blue Blood is the planned sequel to The Golden Circle and the fourth movie in the franchise. In December 2017, Vaughn provided insight into his plans for the untitled film, confirming there would be one massive new addition to the cast, though he has not decided who would play the role yet. In March 2018, Vaughn confirmed he was still working on the script for the movie. In another interview, he teased the possible return of Mark Strong's Merlin, but did not confirm or deny the rumours. Vaughn revealed to Empire that he's planning a Kingsman movie which would cap-off the "Harry Hart-Eggsy relationship" trilogy. In December 2021, Vaughn revealed that filming on the sequel will begin in September 2022.

Vaughn revealed that a spin-off film of Kingsman: The Golden Circle, revolving around the Statesman, an American secret agent organization, was in early development. The film's working title was announced to be Statesman. In June 2018, Vaughn announced his new film studio along with several projects in development including Statesman, confirming that Channing Tatum, Jeff Bridges and Halle Berry would reprise their roles in the film.

== Reception ==
=== Box office performance ===
Box office performance of Kingsman
| Film | U.S. release date | Box office gross | | | All-time ranking | | Budget | Ref. |
| Film | U.S. release date | U.S. and Canada | Other territories | Worldwide | U.S. and Canada | Worldwide | Budget | Ref. |
|---|---|---|---|---|---|---|---|---|
| Kingsman: The Secret Service | 13 February 2015 | $128,261,724 | $286,089,822 | $414,351,546 | 450 | 254 | $81–94 million | |
| Kingsman: The Golden Circle | 22 September 2017 | $100,234,838 | $310,667,824 | $410,902,662 | 699 | 260 | $104 million | |
| The King's Man | 22 December 2021 | $37,176,373 | $88,721,105 | $125,897,478 | | | $100 million | |
| Total | | $265,672,935 | $685,478,751 | $951,151,686 | | | $285–298 million | |

=== Critical and public response ===
Critical and public response of Kingsman
| Film | Critical | | Public |
| Film | Rotten Tomatoes | Metacritic | CinemaScore |
|---|---|---|---|
| Kingsman: The Secret Service | 75% (266 reviews) | 60 (50 reviews) | B+ |
| Kingsman: The Golden Circle | 50% (309 reviews) | 44 (44 reviews) | B+ |
| The King's Man | 41% (181 reviews) | 44 (40 reviews) | B+ |

== Music ==
Music from Kingsman films
| Title | U.S. release date | Length | Composer(s) | Label |
|---|---|---|---|---|
| Kingsman: The Secret Service – Original Motion Picture Score | 30 January 2015 | 57:27 | Henry Jackman; Matthew Margeson | La-La Land Records |
| Kingsman: The Golden Circle – Original Motion Picture Score | 22 September 2017 | 1:16:00 | Henry Jackman; Matthew Margeson | Fox Music |
| The King's Man – Original Motion Picture Score | 22 December 2021 | 1:18:00 | Matthew Margeson; Dominic Lewis | Hollywood Records |

== Оther media ==
=== Video games ===
In August 2017, it was confirmed that Kingsman: The Golden Circle would have a tie-in game to accompany its release, and that it would be a turn-based match-3 role-playing combat game, released on iOS and Android by the Korean mobile game company NHN PixelCube. The game also includes characters from Kingsman: The Secret Service, and was released globally on 14 September 2017, about a week before the film's release. Unlike the films, the game does not have graphic violence or explicit language, but it is classified a "12+" rating for "mild realistic violence". In the days before the film's release, another mobile game based on the Kingsman franchise, simply titled Kingsman: The Secret Service, was announced to be in development also for iOS and Android, by American mobile game developer YesGnome. The game is a hybrid action adventure-construction simulator, where players construct impregnable secret bases, similar to Fallout Shelter, while infiltrating enemy bases in run-and-gun missions based on the plot of at least the first film. The Android version remained in early access for many months. The Golden Circle is free-to-play, offers in-app purchases, and supports online player-versus-player multiplayer, while The Secret Service is sold as a paid game.

Several months later after the launch of the tie-in mobile game for Kingsman: The Golden Circle, on 24 April 2018, it was announced that the game's servers will be shut down on 23 May 2018, after "careful consideration" and the game's poor player base. Meanwhile, after many months in early access, Yesgnome's Kingsman: The Secret Service was finally released on 1 May 2019.

=== Literature ===
Kingsman: The Golden Circle: The Official Movie Novelization, the novelization of the 2017 film Kingsman: The Golden Circle, written by Tim Waggoner, was released on 22 September 2017.

=== Marketing ===
Luxury retailer Mr Porter has been a marketing partner of the franchise since the first film, when it worked with costume designer Arianne Phillips to design the bespoke suiting, while everything from the ties and shirts to eyewear, umbrellas, shoes and watches were designed by heritage brands such as Cutler and Gross, George Cleverley, Mackintosh, Bremont, and Adidas Originals. The collaboration is the first of its kind, making Kingsman: The Secret Service the first film from which customers can buy all of the outfits they see. On 8 September 2017, Mr Porter opened its first Kingsman shop between Berry Bros. & Rudd and Lock & Co. Hatters on St James's Street in Central London. Both the Kingsman shop and Berry Bros. & Rudd were integral locations for Kingsman: The Golden Circle, while Lock & Co. was featured on the first film.

In May 2017, TAG Heuer partnered with Fox to make the TAG Heuer Connected the official watch of the Kingsman agents. In August 2017, Fox partnered with Old Forester to release a Statesman edition of their 95 proof Bourbon whiskey for the U.S. market. In addition, GlenDronach released a Kingsman Edition 1991 of their Scotch whisky. Director Vaughn cited GlenDronach as his favourite scotch whisky brand, and the distillery used casks from 1991, as it is the fictional year of Eggsy's birth. Only 240 bottles have been allocated to the U.S. market, all of which are signed by Vaughn. In addition, Berry Bros. & Rudd released a Kingsman edition of their No. 3 London Dry Gin. In September 2017, Hard Rock Cafe introduced the "Poppy Burger" in their menu to promote The Golden Circle.

Funko released Pop! Vinyl figures of Harry, Eggsy, Valentine, and Gazelle in 2017.

== Shared universe ==
In September 2017, Mark Millar revealed he had discussed a possible Kingsman/Hit-Girl crossover film with Matthew Vaughn, with a post-credits cameo for Hit-Girl in a Kingsman film having been considered. In October 2023, Vaughn announced that he is working on an untitled spy-centred universe through his Marv Studios. The filmmaker stated that it will include the Kingsman franchise, the Argylle films, and an untitled third franchise; while the plan is to have each of these culminate in a crossover at some point in the future. The first connection was officially shown during the mid-credits sequence in Argylle, its revealed that the titular spy had affiliations with the Kingsman during his younger years.

== Future ==
In October 2024, during an interview with The Hollywood Reporter, 20th Century Studios executive Steve Asbell revealed that "there's no plans on doing [any Kingsman sequels or prequels] anytime soon".

=== Third film, prequel and Television show ===
==== Kingsman: The Blue Blood ====
In May 2017, Vaughn stated that a sequel to The Golden Circle was currently in development, adding that he and co-writer Goldman mapped out the plot during production on the second film. Vaughn later stated that his personal choice for the role of the villain is Dwayne Johnson. By June 2018, the filmmaker announced that the third movie would be filmed back-to-back with a prequel, serving as "the conclusion of the Harry Hart–Eggsy relationship". Colin Firth and Taron Egerton will both reprise their roles from previous films. Vaughn stated production is scheduled to begin some time between late 2019 and early 2020. In September 2020, the film was given the working title of Kingsman: The Blue Blood. In December 2021, Vaughn revealed that filming on the sequel would begin in September 2022, for an intended 2023 release date but in July 2022, Egerton believed that filming would start in 2023. Vaughn tells Collider that the film is the beginning and end of the film and wants to get it made before Firth and Egerton are too old to appear in the series. However, as of October 2024, the president of 20th Century Studios stated "There's no plans on doing them anytime soon."

==== The King's Man: The Traitor King ====
In October 2023, it was reported that a sequel to The King's Man was in early development, tentatively entitled The King's Man: The Traitor King, following the fictionalised rise of Adolf Hitler (portrayed by David Kross) in the franchise's alternate history setting, "coming to power and basically supported by the English aristocracy". Speaking to Collider's Maggie Lovitt at New York Comic-Con, Vaughn stated that the script for The King's Man: The Traitor King had been completed. In October 2024, during an interview with The Hollywood Reporter, 20th Century Studios executive Steve Asbell revealed that the studio has no plans for any Kingsman sequels or prequels.

==== Statesman ====
In June 2018, upon announcing his new film studio, Vaughn revealed that an eight-episode Kingsman television series was in early development. Initially announced as a spin-off film in September 2017, a television series centred around the franchise's American secret agent organization named the Statesman is in development. In June 2018, Vaughn announced his new film studio along with several projects currently in development including a Statesman film; confirming that Channing Tatum, Jeff Bridges and Halle Berry would reprise their respective roles. In December 2021, Vaughn announced that the project was officially being redeveloped as a television series. The filmmaker stated that they look to Marvel Studios' Loki on Disney+ for inspiration on the series.
