= Luigi Cavenago =

Luigi Cavenago, also credited as Gigi Cavenago (born October 12, 1982, in Milan), is an Italian comic book artist and illustrator. He lives and works in Frascati.

== Life and career ==
Gigi Cavenago
- Born: Luigi Cavenago; October 12, 1982 (age 43); Milan
- Occupation: comic book artist
- Years active: 2002-present
- Notable work: Dylan Dog, Orfani, The Magic Order

After completing his high school diploma, he refined his technique by attending the Milan School of Comics for two years, as well as a graphic design course at the Rizzoli Institute for Graphic Arts Education.

His editorial debut came in 2005 with the short story Predatore naturale, published in the first issue of the magazine Strike, edited by Star Comics. Immediately after, he joined the group of artists for Jonathan Steele's second series, and collaborated with Cronaca di Topolinia, later becoming the sole artist for the miniseries Dr. Voodoo, written by Giovanni Gualdoni and published in the monthly magazine Brand New! by Free Books.

Since 2008, he has worked for Sergio Bonelli Editore, working on Dylan Dog since 2014 and becoming the cover artist since 2016.

With Werther Dell'Edera and Giovanna Niro he worked on the Batman/Dylan Dog crossover comics published in 2023.

In September 2021, he left his role as Dylan Dog cover artist to work with Mark Millar's The Magic Order, published by Image Comics/Millarworld.

He has also worked with Disney Comics, DC Comics and as illustrator for magazines and conventions.

He won an Emmy Award for Outstanding Individual Achievement in Animation – Production Design and an Annie Award for Production Design for the short animation How Zeke Got Religion part of Netflix's Love, Death, and Robots animated anthology.

For cinema, he worked for Sony on Spider-man: Across the Spider-Verse and Spider-man: Beyond the Spider-verse

== Awards ==
- 2014- Premio Gran Guinigi - Best Artist
  - Premio Boscarato - Best Italian Artist
- 2016- Premio U Giancu - Best Realistic artist
- 2017- Premio Micheluzzi - Best Artist (for Dylan Dog #361)
- 2021- Premio Boscarato- Best Cover Artist
- 2025- Emmy Awards - Outstanding Individual Achievement In Animation
  - Annie Awards - Best Production Design - TV/Media
  - Heroes International Film Fest - Heroes Action Award
