= Millarworld =

American comic book company

- Parent company: Netflix (2017–present)
- Status: Active
- Founded: 2003; 23 years ago
- Founder: Mark Millar
- Country of origin: United States
- Headquarters location: West Hollywood, California
- Key people: Mark Millar (president and CCO)
- Fiction genres: Superhero fiction
- Official website: mrmarkmillar.com

Millarworld Limited is an imprint of comic books published by Scottish comic book writer Mark Millar as a creator-owned line, featuring characters created by him in a shared fictional universe, the Millarworld, or Millarverse. These characters include Wesley Gibson, Kick-Ass, Hit-Girl, Eggsy Unwin, Nemesis, Duke McQueen, Edison Crane, and others, while the events of Jupiter's Legacy and Supercrooks exist as popular fiction within the world of the Millarworld. The imprint was launched in 2003 with the publication of the miniseries Wanted, followed by Kick-Ass – The Dave Lizewski Years, Kingsman, War Heroes, and The Magic Order, and later the crossover series Big Game. While the majority of series in the line are written by Millar himself, the series Kingsman, Kick-Ass – The New Girl and Hit-Girl feature new writers from their second volumes onward, after Millar wrote the series' first volumes.

== Licensing and adaptation ==
Wanted, published by Top Cow Productions, was loosely adapted into a feature film of the same name by Universal Pictures, released on 27 June 2008. Chosen, published by Dark Horse Comics, was described by Millar as a sequel to the Bible, and has been optioned by Sony Pictures. Kick-Ass, which was illustrated by John Romita Jr. and published by Marvel, was adapted into a film of the same name by Matthew Vaughn, and released in the United Kingdom on 26 March 2010 and the United States on 16 April.

In September 2008, it was announced that the yet unfinished War Heroes had been optioned by Sony Pictures Entertainment, with Michael De Luca as producer and Millar taking an executive producer role.

Millar has stated that whenever he sells the film adaptation rights to one of his creator-owned comics properties, he gives half of the money to the artist who illustrated the comics, despite his agent's reaction to this, saying, "Everything, all the money from the advance, the toys, the games, 50–50, so it's fair. I see it as a collaboration. If I drew, I could keep everything for myself, but I actually like the idea of having a talent that I'm not selling. One of my friends said, 'You could make even more money by drawing, too,' and I said, 'Yeah, and I suppose I could make even more money by lap dancing. It's nice to have something that's just for me."

== History ==
In October 2014, following months of delays for Jupiter's Legacy #5, Millar stated that beginning in April 2015, all Millarworld series would be completely drawn before the publication of their debut issues, in order to maintain a monthly schedule.

On 7 August 2017, Millarworld was acquired by the American streaming media company Netflix.

The first comic book series that Millarworld published post acquisition was The Magic Order. The first issue was published on 13 June 2018.

On 17 July 2018 it was announced that Netflix had started work on the first set of films to be adapted from comics. These are: Empress, Huck and Sharkey the Bounty Hunter. The comic book series Jupiter's Legacy and American Jesus will be adapted as television series.

On 6 December 2018, Millar provided an update to the progress of the Millarworld properties adapted for Netflix. Jupiter's Legacy would be the first television series announced, with Steven S. DeKnight as planned as showrunner (before Sang Kyu Kim took over following DeKnight's exit from the series), with The Chosen One (based on American Jesus) as the second live-action television series released, with Everardo Gout and Leopoldo Gout as the showrunners and Gout serving as director. Empress, Sharkey the Bounty Hunter and Huck are scheduled to be feature films in development. Under Netflix, Millar will exclusively adapt new Millarworld properties to the streaming service, with select properties having comic book tie-ins, starting with Prodigy.

On 11 March 2019, Netflix announced that it would produce an anime series based on Supercrooks. It was produced by Bones.

In late 2022, several updates on Millarworld production were given, including that Huck would be redeveloped as a TV series as opposed to a movie and that a live-action Supercrooks series would follow Jupiter's Legacy after the show was canceled after its first season. That same year it was announced that Millar would be launching four brand new comic series (Night Club, Nemesis: Reloaded, The Magic Order 4 and The Ambassadors) and that they would lead into a crossover event entitled Big Game, which would be illustrated by Pepe Larraz and serve as a crossover between every Millarworld property.

In May 2023, it was revealed that Big Game is actually a sequel to Wanted, Millar's first creator-owned work, and follows Wesley Gibson and the Fraternity teaming up with Matthew Anderson / Nemesis to take down the latest wave of superheroes that have popped back up in the world following the actions of Dave Lizewski / Kick-Ass.

In December 2023, it was revealed that Millar had signed a deal with Dark Horse Comics to become the new publisher of the Millarworld titles. This includes reprints of previous Millarworld titles and new series, with five brand-new series launching in 2024, one of them being Nemesis: Rogues' Gallery with artist Valerio Giangiordano.

== List of Millarworld publications ==
Year	Title	Issues	Artist	Publisher	Adaptation
2004	Chosen/American Jesus	3	Peter Gross	Dark Horse Comics	The Chosen One
2004	Wanted	6	J. G. Jones	Top Cow Productions	Wanted
2008–2010	Kick-Ass	8	John Romita Jr.	Icon Comics	Kick-Ass
2008–2009	War Heroes	6 (3 unpublished)	Tony Harris	Image Comics	
2010	Nemesis	4	Steve McNiven	Icon Comics	Upcoming film
2010	Superior	7	Leinil Francis Yu	Icon Comics	
2010–2012	Kick-Ass 2	7	John Romita Jr.	Icon Comics	Kick-Ass 2
2012	Supercrooks	4	Leinil Francis Yu	Icon Comics	Super Crooks (anime series) Upcoming Netflix live-action series
2012	Kingsman: Secret Service	6	Dave Gibbons	Icon Comics	Kingsman: The Secret Service Kingsman franchise
2012–2013	Hit-Girl	5	John Romita Jr.	Icon Comics	
2013–2014	Kick-Ass 3	8	John Romita Jr.	Icon Comics	
2013–2017	Jupiter's Legacy	10 (2 volumes)	Frank Quitely	Image Comics	Jupiter's Legacy
2014	Starlight	6	Goran Parlov	Image Comics	
2014–2015	MPH	5	Duncan Fegredo	Image Comics	
2015	Chrononauts	4	Sean Gordon Murphy	Image Comics	
2015–2016	Jupiter's Circle	12 (2 volumes)	Wilfredo Torres	Image Comics	
2015–2016	Huck	6	Rafael Albuquerque	Image Comics	Upcoming Netflix series
2016	Millarworld Annual	1	Various	Image Comics	Anthology
2016	Empress	7	Stuart Immonen	Icon Comics	Upcoming Netflix film
2016–2017	Reborn	6	Greg Capullo	Image Comics	Upcoming Netflix film
2017–2018	Kingsman: The Red Diamond	6	Simon Fraser	Image Comics	
2018	The Magic Order	6	Olivier Coipel	Image Comics	Upcoming Netflix series
2018	Prodigy.	6	Rafael Albuquerque	Image Comics	Upcoming Netflix film
2018–2019	Kick-Ass – The New Girl	18 (3 volumes)	John Romita Jr. and Marcelo Frusin	Image Comics	
2018–2019	Hit-Girl Season One	12 (3 volumes)	Ricardo López Ortiz, Amy Reeder, Eduardo Risso, and Rafael Albuquerque (Colombia, Canada, and Rome)	Image Comics	
2019	Sharkey the Bounty Hunter	6	Simone Bianchi	Image Comics	Upcoming Netflix film
2019	Space Bandits	5	Matteo Scalera	Image Comics	Upcoming Netflix film
2019	Chrononauts: Futureshock	4	Eric Canete	Image Comics	
2019–2020	American Jesus: The New Messiah	3	Peter Gross	Image Comics	
2019–2020	Hit-Girl Season Two	12 (3 volumes)	Pernille Ørum, Goran Parlov, Alison Sampson, and Declan Shalvey (Hollywood, Hong Kong, and India)	Image Comics	
2020–2021	Kick-Ass vs. Hit-Girl	5	Marcelo Frusin	Image Comics	
2021	Jupiter's Legacy: Requiem	6	Tommy Lee Edwards, Matthew Dow Smith	Image Comics	
2021–2022	King of Spies	4	Matteo Scalera	Image Comics	
2021–2022	The Magic Order 2	6	Stuart Immonen	Image Comics	
2022	Prodigy. The Icarus Society	5	Matteo Buffagni	Image Comics	
2022	The Magic Order 3	6	Gigi Cavenago	Image Comics	
2022–2023	Night Club	6	Juanan Ramirez	Image Comics	Upcoming Netflix series
2022–2023	American Jesus: Revelation	3	Peter Gross	Image Comics	
2023	Nemesis: Reloaded	5	Jorge Jimenez	Image Comics	
2023	The Magic Order 4	6	Dike Ruan	Image Comics	
2023	The Ambassadors	6	Frank Quitely, Karl Kerschl, Travis Charest, Olivier Coipel, Matteo Buffagni, Matteo Scalera	Image Comics	
2023	Big Game	5	Pepe Larraz	Image Comics	
2024–2025	Nemesis: Rogues' Gallery	5	Valerio Giangiordano	Dark Horse Comics	
2024–2025	Night Club 2	6	Juanan Rameirez	Dark Horse Comics	
2024–2025	Prodigy. Slaves of Mars	5	Stefano Landini	Dark Horse Comics	
2024–2025	Jupiter's Legacy: Finale	5	Tommy Lee Edwards	Dark Horse Comics	
2024–2025	The Magic Order 5	6	Matteo Buffagni	Dark Horse Comics	
2025	Nemesis: Forever	5	Matteo Scalera	Dark Horse Comics	
2025	Vatican City	3	Per Berg	Dark Horse Comics	
2025	Huck: Big bad world	6	Rafael Alburquerque	Dark Horse Comics	
2026	Star-Crossed				
