= Superior (comics) =

Superhero comic book series

- Superior #1, art by Leinil Francis Yu

Publication information
- Publisher: Icon Comics (Marvel Comics)
- Format: Limited series
- Genre: Superhero
- Publication date: October 2010 – March 2012
- No. of issues: 7
- Main character: Superior / Simon Pooni

Creative team
- Created by: Mark Millar; Leinil Francis Yu
- Written by: Mark Millar
- Penciller: Leinil Francis Yu
- Inker: Gerry Alanguilan
- Colorist: Clayton Cowles
- Editor: John Barber

Superior is a creator-owned comic book series written by Mark Millar and illustrated by Leinil Francis Yu, following a young boy with multiple sclerosis who sells his soul to become a superhero. Set in the Millarworld, it is published by Marvel Comics under the company's Icon imprint, from October 2010 to March 2012. The series' protagonist, Simon Pooni, returned in Kick-Ass: The Dave Lizewski Years – Book Four in 2014, Superior: Symptoms in 2017, and Big Game in 2023.

== Synopsis ==
Simon Pooni, an angry, bitter 12-year-old boy with multiple sclerosis, which cost him a basketball career, idolizes superheroes, particularly Superior, a Superman analogue and the star of the popular Superior film series. An alien monkey named Ormon appears at Simon's bedside, informing the boy that of all the people on Earth, he has been granted the honor of being bestowed a single magic wish. Simon is then transformed into a real version of the fictional Superior.

After playing the role of Superior for a week, he learns that Ormon is actually a demon incarnate, and he must sell his soul to the devil in order to remain as Superior. He is given 24 hours to decide, and is returned to his old body. The demon approaches an old bully of Simon, and offers him a similar wish, to become Superior's fictional nemesis, Abraxas; the only caveat is that he must pledge himself to the devil. Simon must then choose whether to become Superior again and save the planet from imminent destruction at the cost of his own soul.

To force Simon to choose, Abraxas begins destroying the city. Simon transforms into Superior and fights both Abraxas and Ormon. Although Superior defeats them in battle, Ormon gloats that he still has Simon's soul, until he realizes that Simon (as Superior) is immortal, and that his soul can never be collected. Ormon is dragged back to Hell as punishment for his failure, and Simon reverts to his mortal form. The world honors Superior as a fallen hero, thinking he was killed in battle, and Simon returns to his former life, but now at peace with himself.

== Promotion ==
Prior to the release of the series, a marketing campaign featuring a Wizard magazine cover and a series of prophetic teaser images – all of which evoked Millar's love for the Superman mythos – were released. Creator Mark Millar also gave comic stores across the world a chance to earn a free full-page advert in the book's first issue by printing off and displaying promotional posters from his official website in their stores. A charity auction was held to name the main character. The winner, Simon Pooni, chose his own name.

== World record ==
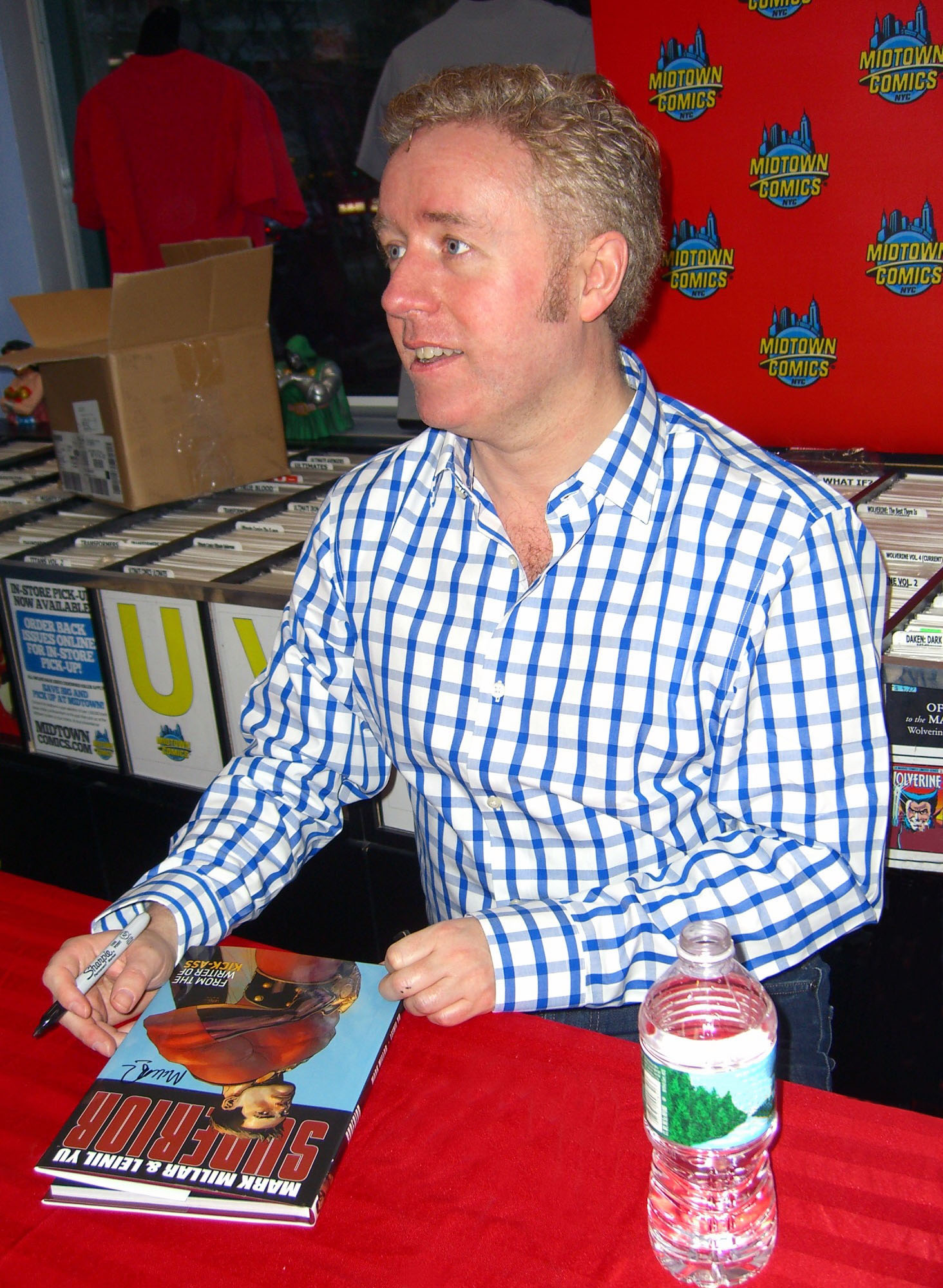
Writer Mark Millar signing a copy of the series' collected edition during an appearance at Midtown Comics.

In April 2011, Mark Millar, Leinil Francis Yu, Frank Quitely, Dave Gibbons, John Romita Jr., Paul Cornell, Andy Diggle, Jock, Duncan Fegredo, Sean Phillips and over fifty other comic book creators collaborated at the inaugural Kapow Comic Convention and used the Superior character to break two Guinness World Records - the fastest comic book ever produced and the biggest number of creators working on a single comic. The Superior World Record Special (Superior Kapow! Special, Kapow! Guinness World Record Special) was written, penciled, inked and lettered in less than 12 hours and sold as a limited 10,000 copy book with all proceeds from its sales going to Yorkhill Sick Children's Hospital in Scotland.

== Follow-ups ==
=== Kick-Ass ===
Simon Pooni returned in the finale of Kick-Ass: The Dave Lizewski Years – Book Four in 2014, written by Millar and illustrated by John Romita Jr., where he is seen being wheeled behind Dave Lizewski as he is giving his closing monologue, revealing the series to be set before the events of Superior.

=== Superior: Symptoms ===
Simon Pooni / Superior returned in Superior: Symptoms in 2017, written by Simon James and illustrated by Alex Aguilar, and published as part of the Millarworld New Talent Annual 2017, an anthology annual consisting of one-shot specials containing winning entries from the online contest for up-and-coming creators held by Millar in 2016. Set during the events of Superior, the story sees Simon telling another person just diagnosed with multiple sclerosis his story while convincing her not to commit suicide.

=== Big Game ===
Simon Pooni next returns in Big Game in 2023, written by Millar and illustrated by Pepe Larraz. Now a teenager, after two agents of the Fraternity of Super-Criminals, Jackie and Trey, are sent after him while the group is in the process of assassinating the world's superheroes, they are shaken to learn of his backstory and inability to become Superior again, before reluctantly atomising him, with Simon dissolving into "a magnificent burst of light and purple flowers". Following Hit-Girl using the Chrononauts' time-travel suits to save the superheroes, Simon is presumably rescued as well.

== Film ==
In Kick-Ass 2 there is a poster of Superior in a flashback of Dave's childhood.

20th Century Fox bought the rights to a feature film in April 2014. Fox hired Brandon and Phillip Murphy to write the film's script while Matthew Vaughn and Tarquin Pack were to produce the film. Millar expressed interest to see John Cena cast as Superior.
