= Nemesis (Icon Comics) =

Comic book series, 2010

Millar & McNiven's Nemesis
- Cover to Nemesis #2 by Steve McNiven

Publication information
- Publisher: Marvel Comics
- Format: Limited series
- Genre: Superhero
- Publication date: May – December 2010
- No. of issues: 4
- Main character: Matthew Anderson / Nemesis

Creative team
- Created by: Mark Millar; Steve McNiven
- Written by: Mark Millar
- Artist: Steve McNiven
- Letterer: Chris Eliopoulos
- Colorist: Dave McCaig
- Editor(s): Dan Ketchum; Nick Lowe

Collected editions
- Hardcover: ISBN 0-7851-4865-5

Millar & McNiven's Nemesis is a creator-owned comic book limited series written by Mark Millar, drawn by Steve McNiven and published by the Icon Comics imprint of Marvel Comics.

Two Image Comics-published sequels followed: Nemesis: Reloaded, and Big Game (both 2023), along with two further Dark Horse Comics-published sequels, Nemesis: Rogues' Gallery (2024–2025) and Nemesis: Forever (2025–2026).

== Publication history ==
The publicity was launched in October 2009, with a teaser image containing the caption "What if Batman was the Joker?" and in a subsequent interview Millar revealed that it was only one of a number of possible lines they went with, his favourite being "What if Batman was a total cunt?" This caused concern at DC Comics, the publisher of Batman, but Millar denied there had been threats of legal action:

One of my friends at DC legal dropped me an informal email back in December saying that someone in editorial was a bit worried by the Batman and Joker mentions in an interview to promote a creator-owned book. They politely asked if I could avoid using those names as it was creating a bit of grief for them and I agreed, saying that's absolutely fine. Steve and I chatted after, wondering if the cover was a little too much too and we decided to ditch it and do another one. It was entirely our decision and a gesture of goodwill, which the lads at DC appreciated. This has never been anything beyond a couple of friendly, informal emails.

The series also gained pre-publication attention when Millar auctioned the right to name the main policeman character, something he had done with Kick-Ass. The winning bid was $8,500 and, as with the previous auction, proceeds went to the charity run by Mark Millar's brother Dr. Bobby Millar which helps children with special needs. It proved so successful that the real name of the main supervillain character was also auctioned off, with the winner, Matthew Anderson, seeing Nemesis' civilian name be named after himself.

In 2017, a one-shot, Nemesis: We are Nemesis, written by Steve Lawrence and illustrated by Marcelo Salazo, was published by Image Comics as part of the Millarworld New Talent Annual 2017, an anthology annual consisting of one-shot specials containing winning entries from the online contest for up-and-coming creators held by Millar in 2016. Set during the events of Nemesis, the story is told from the perspective of one of Nemesis' followers.

A follow-up miniseries, titled Nemesis: Reloaded, launched in January 2023 with Jorge Jimenez serving as artist, with the series serving as a soft reboot of the character, helping to better integrate the character into the greater Millarworld shared universe, with a new Matthew "Nemesis" Anderson being trained by Wesley "The Killer II" Gibson. Following the conclusion of Reloaded, Nemesis then appeared in Big Game, a crossover with every Millarworld property illustrated by Pepe Larraz in July the same year. Two new Nemesis titles were published by Dark Horse Comics: Nemesis: Rogues' Gallery, written by Millar with Valerio Giangiordano serving as artist, was released from 2024 to 2025, and a fourth series written by Millar, Nemesis: Forever, was released from 2025 to 2026.

== Plot synopsis ==
The supervillain Nemesis destroys a building in Tokyo, killing a SWAT team and a police inspector. In Washington, D.C., the FBI informs metro police Chief Inspector Blake Morrow that Nemesis is targeting him next. He is given a card reading "Blake Morrow, March 12th at midnight, Flatline still counts". Morrow has his family put in protective custody. Nemesis hijacks Air Force One over the District of Columbia, taking the United States president hostage and crashing the plane into Washington D.C., killing hundreds. Nemesis makes an international broadcast, revealing the President hostage in front of him.

Nemesis reveals to his henchmen that his real name is Matt Anderson, and his father had committed suicide after Morrow tried to imprison him for hunting runaway teenagers with his rich friends. Bored of good behaviour and less excitement, Anderson travelled the world to learn the ways of crime, hoping to fulfil his mother's dying wish to have Morrow killed.

Nemesis kills twenty-thousand people at the Pentagon using poison gas while Morrow is there but Morrow and his partner Stuart survive. Nemesis appears in front of them and Morrow and Stuart fire, but Nemesis is behind bullet-proof glass. He reveals he put the antidote in their morning coffee in order to taunt Morrow about the inspector's projected March 12 death. Police capture Nemesis, who claims he allowed himself to be caught. Nemesis' henchmen have already infiltrated the prison. Nemesis breaks free, kills 97 guards with his bare hands, and frees the inmates, and then destroys the prison. He kidnaps Morrow's children, forcing Morrow to reveal secrets: his wife had an affair; his son is gay; and his daughter had a secret abortion. All of these secrets were kept from him as Morrow is a devoted Catholic. Nemesis releases the children but he has artificially inseminated Morrow's daughter with the son's sperm, with her womb rigged to collapse if an abortion is attempted. An enraged Morrow eventually believes he has discovered Nemesis' hideout and arrives there with a police team, only to find it is a trap. The house explodes, knocking Morrow unconscious. When Morrow awakens, Nemesis reveals that Stuart has been working for him. Stuart reveals Nemesis promised to pay him $10 million for his work and tells Morrow that Nemesis' henchmen retire after every job. Nemesis shoots and kills Stuart and jokingly says: "Well, that's one way of putting it". Nemesis reveals that his "Matthew Anderson" story was made up: he is simply rich and bored, creating death and havoc for his own amusement. The real Matthew Anderson died in an Indian whorehouse, after squandering his inheritance.

Nemesis reveals they are in the White House's Oval Office, where Morrow's wife Peggy and the U.S. president have bombs strapped to their chests. With the staff and Secret Service agents killed, and Nemesis gives Morrow a detonator and tells him he has thirty seconds to kill either the president or his family. With four seconds left, the president steps-up to Nemesis and tells Morrow to detonate his bomb, which he does. Nemesis survives the blast, and in a final confrontation, he and Morrow shoot each other. Morrow kills Nemesis with a headshot, but Morrow is injured from a shot to the stomach and is taken to a hospital. He flatlines during the surgery but survives, during the surgery Morrow's son goes through his wallet looking at family photos and finding the card from Nemesis, and the clock shows midnight. The scene ends with a dead Nemesis, with part of his head missing and a big smile. As the series concludes, Morrow is on a beach during a vacation with his family, including his newborn triplet granddaughters. There he is given a letter, ostensibly given to the waiter ten years earlier, congratulating Morrow and claiming to be from the head of a company that arranges for rich people to become supervillains. The comic ends with the owner of the company (revealed as an older Wesley Gibson in Nemesis: Reloaded) sitting on the beach, enjoying the sunset. Although Nemesis is dead, it is likely that a new supervillain will rise.

== Reception ==
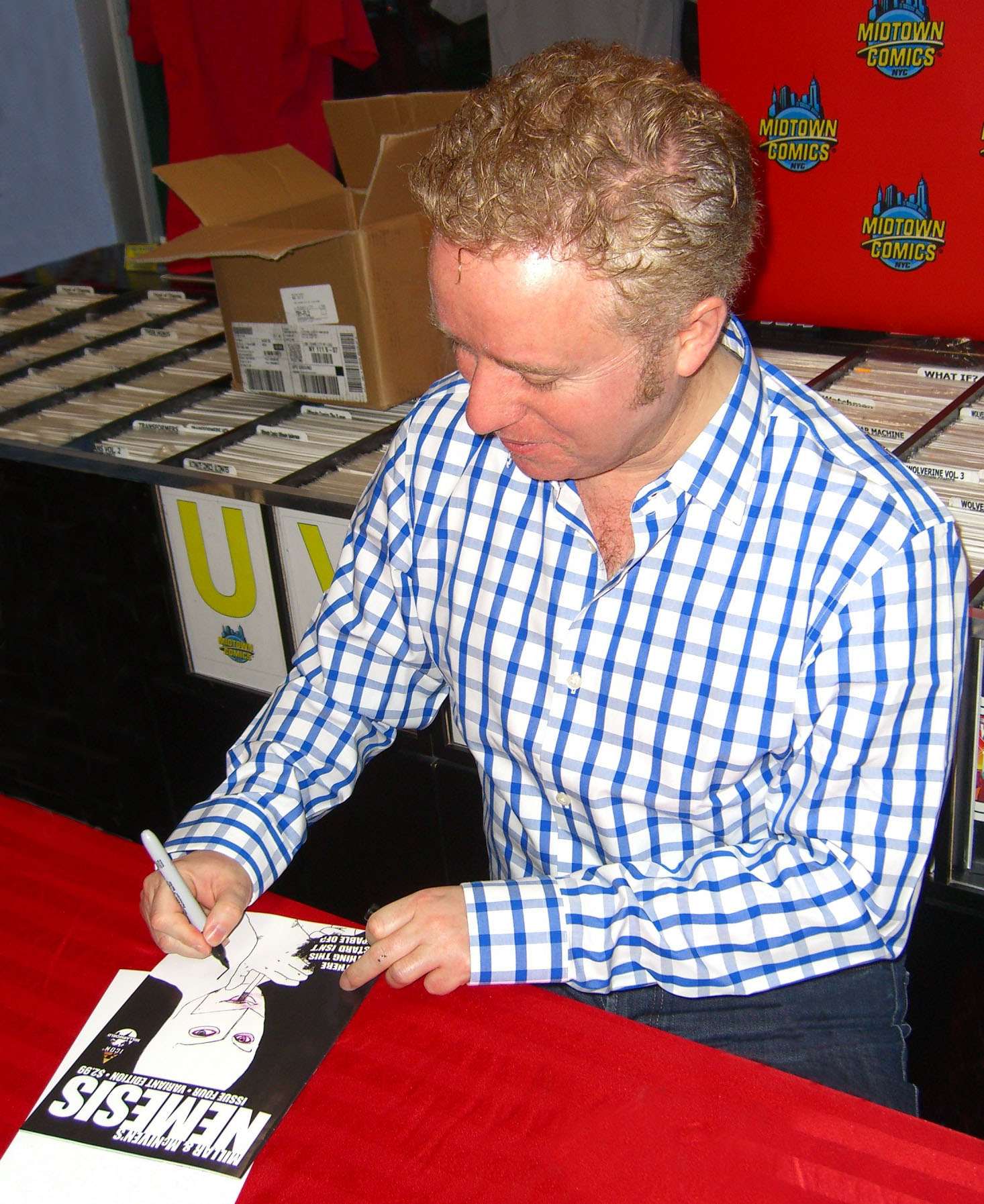
Writer Mark Millar signing a copy of the book during an appearance at Midtown Comics in Manhattan.

Greg McElhatton of Comic Book Resources gave the first issue a 1 out of 5. He said Millar's script "feels stale from start to finish ... moving through the paces at a plodding speed with nothing out of the ordinary. I wish I could say it was because Millar had tried to trade in over-the-top antics for subtlety, but [it's] almost like someone else was trying to figure out what made Millar's comics popular and then throwing most of the tricks out without bothering to replace them with anything else". He found artist McNiven's work uninteresting and McCaig's colors muted and slightly dull.

Dan Phillips of IGN gave the premiere issue an "Okay" score of 6 out of 10. He was disappointed by the artwork, saying it accentuates the shortcomings of Millar's script, finding McNiven's minimalistic style less impressive than his work on Old Man Logan. Phillips gave issue #3 the same score, describing the comic as "somewhat entertaining" but "not the least bit clever, witty, tasteful, sophisticated or original". He complains about the lack of depth to this high concept story, seeing it only as an excuse for the next violent spectacle. He concludes that readers should skip the series unless they are die-hard fans of Millar's work.

Nicholas Yanes of SciFiPulse.net called the premiere issue "fantastic" and argued that while the series lacked heart in comparison with Millar's Kick-Ass, "this works to point out that the real world is not run by good intentions, but by selfish motivations, ego, and pride. Moreover, the stability that people apply to modern society is as much a construct as the buildings that [a] terrorist can so easily bring down".

== Collected editions ==
The series has been collected into the single volume Nemesis (112 pages, hardcover, February 2011, ISBN 0-7851-4865-5).

== Film ==
The rights to make a Nemesis film were optioned by 20th Century Fox. Tony Scott was set to direct it before his death, in conjunction with his Scott Free production company. In 2010 Joe Carnahan was reportedly working on the screenplay for the film. Carnahan was confirmed as the director two years later, also as a writer of the script with his brother Matthew Carnahan. Mark Millar saw the script for Nemesis in Autumn 2013 and praised Joe and Matthew's take on his comic book character, stating the film is going to be "massive". The script by Joe Carnahan was finished in February 2015. Millar said if Kingsman: The Secret Service did well at the box office, the film might start filming that year. The rights however lapsed and in August the same year Warner Bros. acquired them to adapt it. By May 2021, Emerald Fennell had written the latest draft of the screenplay.
