= The Magic Order =

Comic book series by Mark Millar

Publication information
- Publisher: Image Comics
- Schedule: Monthly/bimonthly (irregular)
- Format: Ongoing series
- Publication date: June 2018
- No. of issues: 24 + 5 (Big Game)
- Main character: Moonstone family

Creative team
- Written by: Mark Millar
- Artists: Olivier Coipel (volume 1); Stuart Immonen (volume 2); Gigi Cavenago (volume 3); Dike Ruan (volume 4)

Collected editions
- The Magic Order: ISBN 978-153430-8718

The Magic Order is a comic book series written by Mark Millar and illustrated by Olivier Coipel (volume one), Stuart Immonen (volume two), Gigi Cavenago (volume 3), and Dike Ruan (volume 4). The first comic in the series was published on 13 June 2018. It is published by Image Comics and the property of Netflix which bought Millarworld in 2017. The first volume consists of six issues and is an R-rated adult fantasy. The comic is the first comic book series released by Millarworld since being acquired by Netflix. The comic marks the start of phase two of Millarworld. Volume two was released 2021–2022, volume three in 2022 and volume four in 2023, along with the crossover miniseries Big Game.

The comic is centered on the Magic Order, a secret group of five families of wizards entrusted to keep the world safe from supernatural and magical threats. The members of the Order live seemingly normal lives, while their true nature remains unknown to the rest of society. However, the Order finds itself in danger as its members are being targeted and picked off one by one by an unknown assailant. They must now find and stop this enemy before they're completely wiped out.

== Plot of the First Volume ==
The Magic Order is a group of five families of wizards. Members of the Order are allowed to live among the rest of society while secretly using their magic to protect the world from supernatural and magical threats. The story focuses on the Moonstones, one of the families of the Magic Order.

The assassination of one of their magicians, Eddie Lisowski, alerts the Order, whose members then deduce that an unknown enemy is intent on picking them off one by one. Leonard Moonstone and his son Regan along with other members of the Order attend the Ceremony of the Broken Wand at Lisowski's funeral. Madame Albany and her fellow dark magicians crash the funeral and antagonize the attendants. Regan accuses Albany of being the mastermind behind Lisowski's assassination as she proceeds to leave the ceremony. The unknown assassin attacks another member of the Order, Dong-Sun. Regan visits his brother Gabriel—a powerful magician who has withdrawn from the magic world—to seek his aid, although to no avail. The rest of the Order, including Leonard's reckless, alcoholic escapologist daughter Cordelia, hold a meeting at Moonstone Castle, the family's base hidden in the dimension inside an oil painting exhibited in the Art Institute of Chicago guarded by seemingly meek Uncle Edgar.

The members suspect Madame Albany's intention is to acquire the Orichalcum, an indestructible magic tome containing the dark spells of Old Atlantis that is so powerful it is "said to cause two World Wars' and can slay a deity". The tome was sealed and bequeathed to Leonard by his uncle, Conrad.

Regan and Cordelia investigate a break-in at the Vault to find the Horologium, a time-eater from the fourth dimension, and a Soul Camera stolen. Madame Albany and her mysterious assassin, the Venetian, assassinate three other members of the Order: Willie, Edith the Librarian, and Moe.

The two Moonstone siblings continue to seek information regarding Madam Albany's assassin after interrogating Rufus. Leonard visits Gabriel to seek help fighting the new threat, a request Gabriel refuses. A flashback revealed that Gabriel's daughter, Rosetta, was killed in an accident involving his magic wand, which led a traumatized Gabriel to give up on magic.

Madame Albany elaborates on her plan and reason to destroy the Order: She is embittered for being bypassed by her own father, the wizard Conrad in favor of Leonard in the bequeathment of the Orichalcum due to her unstable mental state and murderous impulses. One night at the Coliseum Theater, where the Moonstones have worked as professional stage magicians for years, the Venetian confronts Leonard. After a brief struggle, the Venetian unleashes a monster called Theonoba to completely obliterate Leonard.

Following their father's death, Regan and Cornelia were advised by Uncle Edgar to attempt a negotiation with Madame Albany at Abington Hotel, a nexus location outside of time-space yet touches all points of time. In spite of the siblings' offerings, Albany aggressively threatens to destroy them and the entirety of the Magic Order. The siblings learn that Gabriel is currently being targeted by the Venetian.

As his neighborhood is under attack by the Horoglobin, Gabriel uses magic to save his wife, Louise, defeat and trap the creature as his siblings arrive. The three hunt down Madame Albany and her allies after they shelter Louise at the Moonstone Castle. They interrogate Angus, Madame Albany's gatekeeper, for her whereabouts before trapping him within the magical version of the book "The Island of Doctor Moreau".

The siblings proceed to Madame Albany's hideout at the Charles Laughton Theater in Los Angeles. Entering the Black Kingdom, they eventually corner her. Gabriel, much to Cordelia's shock, murders Regan by Albany's order. 'Louise', who turns out to be Madame Albany's shapeshifting henchman Lord Cornwall tasked to infiltrate the castle and retrieve the Orichalcum, incapacitates Uncle Edgar while the real Louise waits for Gabriel, accompanied by Albany's allies.

Gabriel then reveals himself as the Venetian and the attack on his family a charade. He has been conspiring with Madame Albany, who promises to resurrect his daughter, to obtain the Orichalcum and destroy the Magic Order. Cordelia, seemingly outnumbered by Albany and her forces, reveals that, as a disobedient daughter, she read and memorized the whole of the forbidden tome and is capable of utilizing its magic. She then resurrects the murdered members of the Order including Regan and Leonard, by sacrificing Albany's allies. Back at the Moonstone Castle, Uncle Edgar confronts Lord Cornwall. He is quickly destroyed by Uncle Edgar, who is implied to be an extremely powerful deity.

Leonard, after an intense battle, manages to kill Madame Albany. An enraged Gabriel wreaks havok on the city, overpowers the Magic Order members and demands them to surrender the Orichalcum for the sake of his daughter until Cordelia persuades Gabriel to sacrifice himself for her resurrection. Gabriel accepts and is killed by Cordelia in exchange for Rosetta's life. Cordelia and Edith go to confront Louise then trap her in the magical version of the book "Crime and Punishment", while Regan takes Rosetta under his care. After the Ceremony of the Broken Wand at Gabriel's funeral, Leonard decides to resign and entrust Cordelia to continue his role and leadership, thus restoring their relationship.

== Characters ==
=== Leonard Moonstone ===
Patron of the Moonstone family and leader of The Magic Order, he is a professional magician by day performing under the name "Moonstone the Magnificent" at the Coliseum Theatre. Leonard separated from his wife in the past, admitting himself to not being a good husband and father. Although initially doubtful, he wishes to correct things with his ex-wife and eventually pass on his role to his daughter Cordelia.

=== Cordelia Moonstone ===
Leonard's daughter; a children's entertainer, stage magician, and professional escapologist by day. Her birth mother was one of Leonard's stage assistants who Leonard impregnated. When her mother attempted to have an abortion, Cordelia used her magic powers to transplant herself into the surgeon's womb. Leonard and his wife adopted her soon after birth. Albeit very brave, she is reckless and rebellious in her youth, using her magic spells at the public to seek attention. An alcoholic, Cordelia desires to prove herself to her father, but often became the family's black sheep. Although viewed as the troublemaker figure, she proved herself to be a formidable magician.

=== Regan Moonstone ===
Leonard's younger son and owner of a Boston nightclub by day. Regan was Leonard's most dependable son, often accompanying him on his performances. Being a hot-headed person, he frequently resolves situations with an impatient and aggressive approach.

=== Gabriel Moonstone ===
Leonard's older son. Despite being a gifted magician with extreme magic powers, he leads a mundane life with his wife and has left the magic world behind since his daughter died in an accident involving his magic wand. Traumatized, he blamed himself and magic for her death. He is later revealed to be the Venetian, the magic assassin working with Madame Albany (named after his attire of Venetian robes, which renders him magically untraceable). He grew ruthless, willing to brutally kill his kin to regain his daughter. In the end, he died an honorable death by sacrificing himself to resurrect his daughter.

=== Edgar Moonstone ===
Leonard's brother (often referred to as Uncle Edgar) and guardian of the Moonstone Castle. It is implied that Uncle Edgar is a being with apocalyptic magical powers. He stated himself to be the reason 'why Egypt is a desert', 'why there are half the stars there used to be' and 'having killed millions the last time he unleashed his powers'. He deliberately traps himself on the grounds of Moonstone Castle to 'protect the world from himself'. He is often seen with his pet Pterodactyl, Isaac.

=== Madame Albany ===
Leonard's cousin, daughter of Conrad, and the main antagonist of the series. She is dangerously unstable, wicked, and ruthless, being the mastermind behind the assassinations of the Magic Order members. She wishes to destroy the Magic Order and overthrow their authority over the magic world, whilst also proving her father wrong for not inheriting the Orichalcum to her. Albany desires to obtain the tome, and in doing so, acquired Gabriel's assistance after promising to resurrect his deceased daughter. Eventually, she is killed in a battle against Leonard.

=== Edith the Librarian ===
A member of the Magic Order and the keeper of the magic library at Moonstone Castle. She was drowned with a magic spell by the Venetian and is later resurrected.

=== Dong-Sun ===
A member of the Magic Order and an acquaintance of Regan. He was killed by the Venetian's changing spell and is later resurrected.

=== Willie ===
A member of the Magic Order and a delivery man by day. He was captured using the Soul Camera, killed by the Venetian and Madame Albany, and is later resurrected.

=== Louise ===
Gabriel's wife, who agreed to work with Madame Albany to have her daughter resurrected.

=== Rosetta Moonstone ===
Gabriel's only daughter died in an accident while playing with her father's magic wand. She is later resurrected and is taken under her uncle Regan's care.

=== Rufus ===
A lowlife magician living on the streets acting as Madame Albany's informant. He was interrogated and later killed by Cordelia and Regan, having been turned into a living candle.

=== Angus ===
Madame Albany's gatekeeper. He was interrogated by the three siblings regarding Madame Albany's whereabouts and was trapped inside the magical version of the book "Robinson Crusoe" before finally relenting and giving the information. He was later trapped within the magical version of the book "The Island of Doctor Moreau", and is presumably killed.

== Collected editions ==
Title	Material collected	Published date	ISBN
The Magic Order Vol. 1	The Magic Order (vol. 1) #1-6	April 2019	978-1534308718
The Magic Order Vol. 2	The Magic Order (vol. 2) #1-6	May 2022	978-1534322202
The Magic Order Vol. 3	The Magic Order (vol. 3) #1-6	February 2023	978-1534324695
The Magic Order Vol. 4	The Magic Order (vol. 4) #1-6	August 2023	978-1534399822

== Development ==
Mark Millar has described The Magic Order as "the Sopranos meets Harry Potter, a magical fantasy-crime thing." Millar has said that he rationalized the fact that there were no monsters around by believing that there are people out there that deal with them before we notice. The comics will look like the Sopranos in that their underworld lives live alongside the real ones. Millar described the basic story structure of the comics as King Lear but with magic wands.

== Critical reception ==
Issue 1 holds a user rating of 8.6 and a critic rating of 8.3 from ComicBook Round Up

Issue 2 holds a user rating of 9.1 and a critic rating of 9.0 from ComicBook Round Up.

Issue 3 holds a user rating of 9.1 and a critic rating of 9.0 from ComicBook Round Up.

In a Library Journal review, Douglas Rednour called the collected edition The Magic Order: Book One a blunt thrill ride that would keep readers guessing.

== Television series adaptation ==
Deadline Hollywood reported that Netflix has given The Magic Order a series order with James Wan and Lindsey Beer attached as executive producers, Beer will also serve as the series' showrunner and Wan will direct the pilot. However, On October 9, 2020, it was reported that Netflix chose not to move forward with the series due to the COVID-19 pandemic, but "hopes to revisit The Magic Order as a TV series in the future." In May 2021, it was announced that the series "is back in active development."
