= Starlight (comic book) =

2014 American comic series

- Cover to Starlight #1

Publication information
- Publisher: Image Comics
- Schedule: Erratic
- Format: Limited series
- Genre: Superhero
- Publication date: March 2014 – October 2014
- No. of issues: 6
- Main character: Duke McQueen

Creative team
- Created by: Goran Parlov
- Written by: Mark Millar
- Artist: Goran Parlov

Starlight, collected as Starlight: The Return of Duke McQueen, is a six-issue limited series from Image Comics, written by Mark Millar with art by Goran Parlov.

== Publication history ==
The 6-issue limited series which ran from March to October 2014.

== Premise ==
40 years ago, US Air Force pilot Duke McQueen was the space hero who saved the universe. But then he came back home to Earth, got married, had kids, and grew old. Now his children have left and his wife has died, leaving him alone with nothing except his memories...until a call comes from a distant world asking him back for his final and greatest adventure.

== Film ==
In 2013 and 2014, The Hollywood Reporter reported that 20th Century Studios would produce the Starlight film with Gary Whitta penning the script. In 2015, Millar told JoBlo that the film was his next project. On April 12, 2021, Deadline reported that Joe Cornish would write and direct the film for 20th Century Studios.
