= Kingsman (comics) =

Comic book series

- Cover for the first issue of The Secret Service

Publication information
- Publisher: Icon Comics (Marvel Comics); Image Comics; Dark Horse Comics (crossover material)
- Format: Limited series
- Genre: Spy fiction
- Publication date: 2012 – 2018
- Main characters: Gary and Jack London; (List of Kingsman characters)

Creative team
- Written by: Mark Millar (TSS); Phillip Huxley (MtW); Rob Williams (TBE, TRD)
- Artists: Dave Gibbons (TSS); Myron Macklin (MtW); Ozgur Yildirim (TBE); Simon Fraser (TRD)

Kingsman is an American comic book series that debuted in 2012 with the first graphic novel, subtitled The Secret Service. Three sequels, subtitled Mum's the Word, The Big Exit, and The Red Diamond, followed in 2016, 2017, and 2018 respectively. The series, following the recruitment of Gary London (later renamed Eggsy Unwin), into a secret spy organization by his uncle, Jack London, and his subsequent world-saving adventures as Agent Galahad, was initially published simply as The Secret Service before being rebranded following the release of the first film adaptation of the series. (Note: In newer collected editions of the first volume of the series, the book The Secret Service was renamed after the film adaptation Kingsman: The Secret Service and all references to MI6 were replaced by "Kingsman".) The series was created by Mark Millar and Dave Gibbons from a concept by Millar and an uncredited Matthew Vaughn, and set in Millar's shared universe, the Millarworld, with the celebrity kidnappings taking place in the first volume being referred to in Kick Ass: The Dave Lizewski Years Book Four, leading into the 2023 crossover event Big Game.

In 2014, a film series was launched with a direct adaptation of The Secret Service, starring Taron Egerton and Colin Firth and directed by Vaughn, followed by the original storyline sequel Kingsman: The Golden Circle in 2017 and prequel The King's Man in 2021, starring Ralph Fiennes.

== Plot ==
=== Miniseries ===
==== The Secret Service (2012–13) ====
The first volume, The Secret Service (2012–13), written by Mark Millar and illustrated by Dave Gibbons, is set over the course of three years. Gary London is recruited by his uncle, Caractacus "Jack" London, to work for Kingsman, the British Secret Service. Gary is put on an extensive three-year training course, performing various assassinations and apprehending a Colombian drug lord. While investigating a series of celebrity kidnappings perpetrated by Dr. James Arnold, a very wealthy cellphone entrepreneur who plans to use a satellite signal to make the poor of humanity slaughter each other to solve the overpopulation problem, London is killed by Arnold for sleeping with his girlfriend, unaware of his Kingsman allegiance. Horrified by his uncle's death, and learning that Arnold is supported by higher-level members of Kingsman, Gary recruits his fellow trainees to an assault mission on Arnold's base, hidden inside a mountain in Switzerland.

After ambushing and battling Arnold's troops, freeing the captured celebrities, including Pierce Brosnan, Patrick Stewart and David Beckham, Gary engages in a fist fight with Arnold's henchman and former Kingsman agent Gazelle, and leaves to confront Arnold. Arnold activates the satellite signal and waits for the people to slaughter each other, but instead, due to one of Gary's colleagues having changed the frequency, people worldwide begin to have sex with one another. Gary then kills a confused Arnold.

In an epilogue, Gary reads his uncle's will, revealing that two-thirds of Jack's estate will go to the Royal National Lifeboat Institution and the British Heart Foundation, the final third going to Gary's mother, informing Gary to take good care of his gadget-laden car, or he will "come back and bloody haunt him." As Gary reports to Kingsman Headquarters, succeeding his uncle as "Agent Galahad", Sir Giles briefs him about a mission that concerns "trouble in Moscow".

==== The Red Diamond (2017–18) ====
The second volume, Kingsman: The Red Diamond, written by Rob Williams and illustrated by Simon Fraser, was released through Image Comics in September 2017, taking place over the course of one week. After knocking out Prince Philip following saving him from a group of Greek terrorists ignorant of the fact that the prince is Greek himself, Gary "Eggsy" Unwin (retconned to have the same surname as his film counterpart) is put on a week-long leave of absence. Returning to Kingsman headquarters to retrieve a pill to treat his little brother Ryan's norovirus, an alert comes in from the South African Secret Service (SASS) regarding an encrypted message sent to a wanted hacker named Alias at Times Square in Manhattan. As the only agent present, Eggsy is sent out on a rocket to find Alias before the SASS.

Upon finding him, Eggsy is confronted by Kwaito – a SASS agent, and Ingot – a Red Diamond agent. Upon being restrained, Alias explains that he was trying to shut down the servers in the financial district to protect them from a virus released by the Red Diamond's agent. Ingot kills Alias and makes his escape, trapping Eggsy and Kwaito. Once he leaves, the virus is unleashed worldwide, causing a global blackout. The Prime Minister of Britain receives a Betamax tape from the head of the Red Diamond, self-made South African mining magnate Jakobis Du Preez, who explains his plans to replace the world's physical money with gold and jewels; in a separate tape, he invites the "Kings and Queens of the new material world" to a remote location in the Hunan Province, China.

Eggsy and Kwaito independently go undercover to the event only for Du Preez to set off a bomb to get rid of "the competition". Retrieving a map to the Red Diamond base from Ingot and crashing into a forest with Kwaito, Eggsy and Kwaito make love. Later finding civilization and a phone to use, Eggsy discovers that Kwaito has stolen the map. Having memorized it, Eggsy travels to Guam where he is reunited with Kwaito. Making their way inside the base, the pair find Du Preez sitting naked on a hill of jewels and gold bars. Du Preez explains that they cannot kill him lest a fail-safe he attached to his heart open the airlocks and kill everyone. After a confrontation with Ingot, Eggsy shoots Du Preez with a poisonous spy-dart which will slowly kill him, and makes his escape with Kwaito and Treeman, a hacker held captive by Du Preez. While fleeing, Treeman gains access to a Red Diamond computer and uploads an override to delete the Red Diamond virus. In the epilogue, a ceremony is held in Eggsy's honour. Several esteemed guests are invited—including Prince Philip, who wants to apologise and shake Eggsy's hand. However, Eggsy instead takes his family and Kwaito to his favourite pub.

=== One-shots ===
==== Mum's the Word (2016) ====
A stand-alone five-page one-shot, Kingsman: The Secret Service: Mum's the Word, written by Phillip Huxley and illustrated by Myron Macklin, was published in the anthology annual Millarworld Annual 2016 in June 2016. Set sometime after The Secret Service, Mum's the Word follows Gary "Eggsy" London as he visits his mother to find a Russian assassin (Billy) waiting for him, after he had foiled his terrorist group's attempt to assassinate Queen Elizabeth on her birthday earlier that day, whom he kills while his mother is out of the room.

==== The Big Exit (2017) ====
A stand-alone six-page one-shot, Kingsman: The Big Exit, was published in the September/October 2017 issue of Playboy Magazine, written by Rob Williams and illustrated by Ozgur Yildirim. Set shortly after Brexit, The Big Exit follows Gary "Eggsy" Unwin (retconned to have the same surname as his film counterpart) as he is tasked with safeguarding the controversial "divorce fee" on its journey to Brussels, consisting of £100 billion in solid gold bars, from a group of pro-Brexit terrorists, "The Union Jacks", disguised as French activists to steal the gold back for the UK. It is eventually revealed that Eggsy's mission is in fact a decoy so that Kingsman themselves can destroy "The Union Jacks" and swipe the gold from both the British Parliament and the European Union and use it to fund hospitals and education services back in England.

== Adaptations ==
In 2014, a film series was launched with an adaptation of The Secret Service, starring Taron Egerton and Colin Firth. To date, it has been followed by a direct sequel Kingsman: The Golden Circle in 2017, and a spin-off prequel The King's Man in 2021, starring Ralph Fiennes.

== Collected editions ==
Title	Material collected	Published date	ISBN
The Secret Service: Kingsman	The Secret Service #1–6	March 2014	978-1781167038
Kingsman: The Red Diamond	Kingsman: The Red Diamond #1–6	April 2018	978-1534305090
