= The 5th Wave =

The 5th Wave may refer to:

- The 5th Wave (novel), a 2013 young adult science fiction novel by Rick Yancey

- The 5th Wave series, the series of novels including Yancey's novel
- The 5th Wave (film), a 2016 film based on Yancey's novel

- The 5th Wave (comic strip), a weekly gag cartoon by Rich Tennant that started in 1981

The Fifth Wave may refer to:

- Fifth-wave feminism, concept of future feminism
