= Chloë Grace Moretz =

American actress (born 1997)

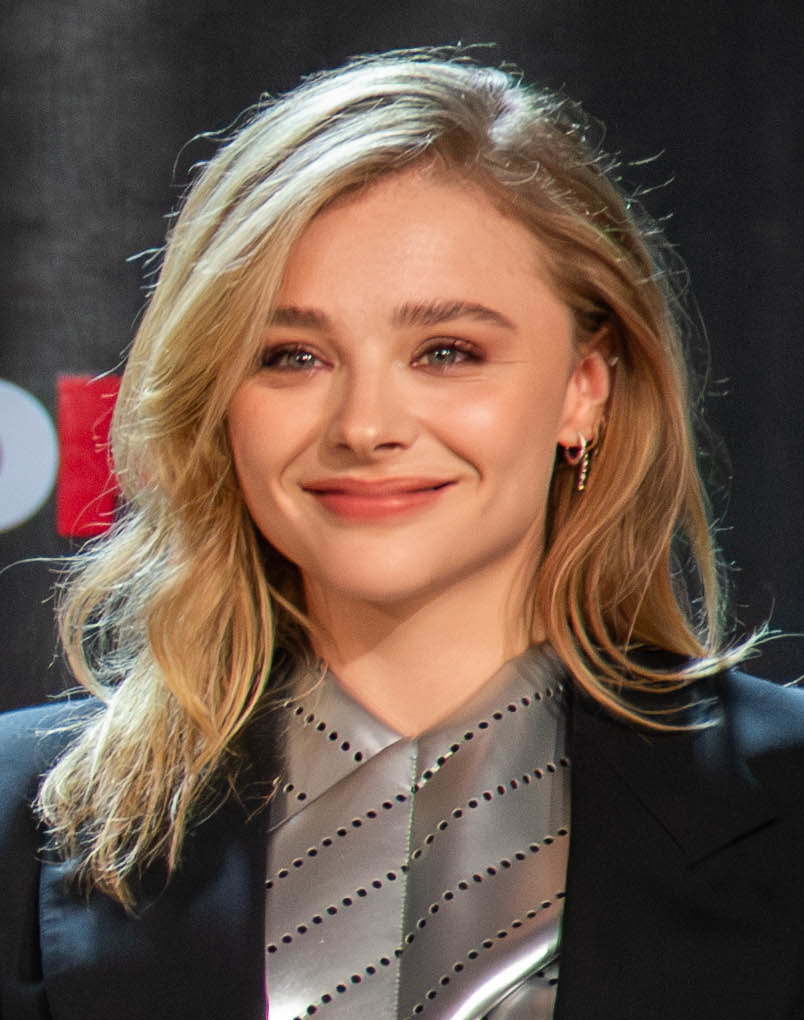
- Moretz in 2022
- Born: February 10, 1997 (age 29); Atlanta, Georgia, U.S.
- Occupation: Actress
- Years active: 2004–present
- Spouse: Kate Harrison (m. 2025)
- Relatives: Gregory Harrison (father-in-law); Randi Oakes (mother-in-law)
- Awards: Full list

Chloë Grace Moretz (/məˈrɛts/ mə-RETS; born February 10, 1997) is an American actress. She began acting as a child, with early roles in the horror film The Amityville Horror (2005), the drama series Desperate Housewives (2006–2007), the horror film The Eye (2008), the drama film The Poker House (2008), the romantic comedy film 500 Days of Summer (2009), and the children's comedy film Diary of a Wimpy Kid (2010). Her breakthrough came in 2010 with her performance as Hit-Girl in the superhero film Kick-Ass.

Moretz starred in Martin Scorsese's adventure film Hugo (2011), Tim Burton's horror comedy film Dark Shadows (2012) and the sitcom 30 Rock (2011–2013), reprised her role as Hit-Girl in Kick-Ass 2 (2013) and portrayed Carrie White in the horror film Carrie (2013). In 2014, Moretz starred in the drama film Clouds of Sils Maria and the action film The Equalizer. She also starred in the thriller film Dark Places (2015), the science fiction action film The 5th Wave (2016) and the comedy film Neighbors 2: Sorority Rising (2016).

Moretz's following roles include the drama film The Miseducation of Cameron Post (2018) and Neil Jordan's thriller film Greta (2018). She voiced Wednesday Addams in The Addams Family (2019) and The Addams Family 2 (2021), and the titular character in Nimona (2023).

On-stage, Moretz's work includes her starring role in the original off-Broadway production of The Library (2014) at The Public Theater in New York City. In September 2025, she starred in the off-Broadway production of Preston Max Allen's play, Caroline, at the MCC Theater.

== Early life ==
Moretz was born in Atlanta, Georgia, and raised in Cartersville, Georgia. Her mother, Teri Duke, is a nurse practitioner, and her father, Dr. McCoy "Mac" Moretz (1957–2021), was a plastic surgeon, and heir to the Moretz hosiery business, bought out in 2011 for $350 million. She has four older brothers: Brandon, Trevor, Colin, and Ethan. An older sister, Kathleen, died shortly after birth. She has described her family as "very Christian", specifically Southern Baptist. She moved to New York City in 2002, with her mother and brother Trevor, because he had been accepted into the Professional Performing Arts School, which is what first drew her interest in acting. Moretz would help Trevor read lines.

== Career ==
=== 2004–2016: Early roles and breakthrough ===
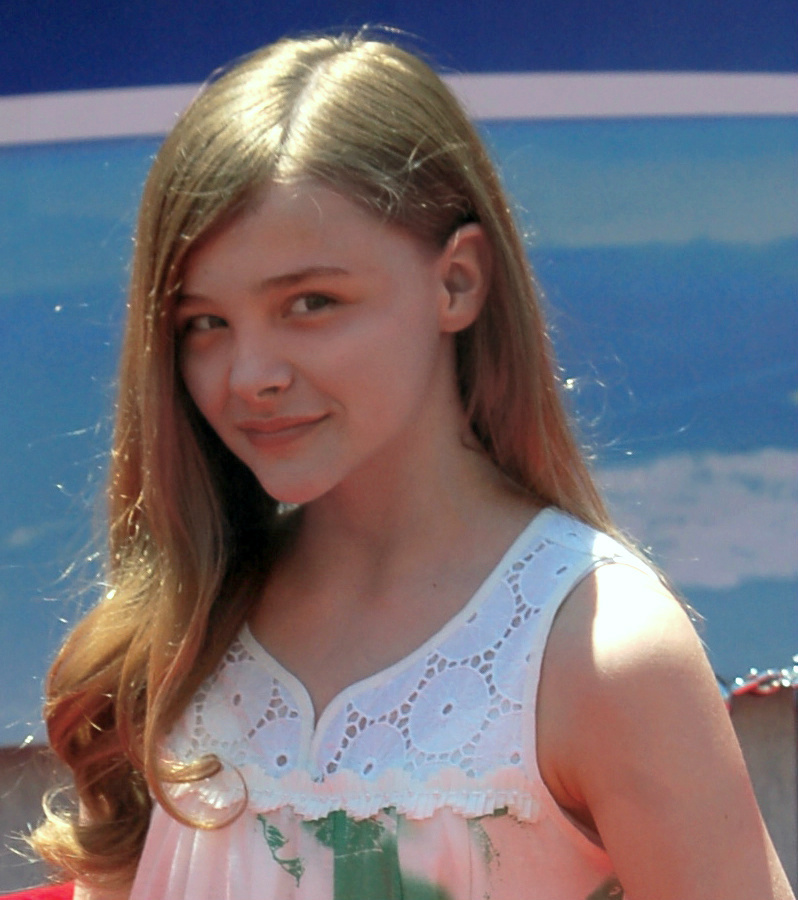
Moretz at the U.S. premiere of Earth in 2009

Moretz's first acting role was as Violet in two episodes of the CBS series The Guardian, and her first film role was as Molly in Heart of the Beholder. It was not until her second big-screen acting role, in the 2005 remake of The Amityville Horror, that she earned greater recognition, receiving a Young Artist Award nomination. After Amityville, Moretz received several guest-starring roles on TV, as well as a small role in Big Momma's House 2. Her recurring TV characters include Kiki George in Dirty Sexy Money and Sherri Maltby in Desperate Housewives. Moretz also voiced the American version of the animated character Darby in My Friends Tigger & Pooh. Moretz also co-starred as Cammie, an abused child, in The Poker House.

In 2008, Moretz appeared in the Disney animated film Bolt as a younger version of Miley Cyrus' character. In 2010, Moretz appeared as Hit-Girl in director Matthew Vaughn's action film Kick-Ass, based on the comic book series of the same name by Mark Millar and John Romita Jr. Moretz trained with Jackie Chan's stunt crew for three months prior to filming and did most of her own stunts while filming on location. Because of her youth, there was controversy about her role in the violent film. She received critical acclaim for her performance. Roger Ebert gave the film only one star, but wrote about Moretz: "Say what you will about her character, but Chloë Grace Moretz has presence and appeal." That same year, she played Abby, a 12-year-old vampire, in Let Me In (2010), the UK/US remake of the Swedish film Let the Right One In.

Moretz played Ann Sliger in the 2011 crime thriller Texas Killing Fields. That same year, she played Isabelle in Martin Scorsese's Hugo, a 3D film adaptation of The Invention of Hugo Cabret, which was nominated for eleven Oscars. Moretz starred in Hick, an adaptation of the novel by Andrea Portes. She appeared in the 2012 Tim Burton film Dark Shadows, a remake of the soap opera, playing the role of Carolyn Stoddard, a rebellious teenage daughter.

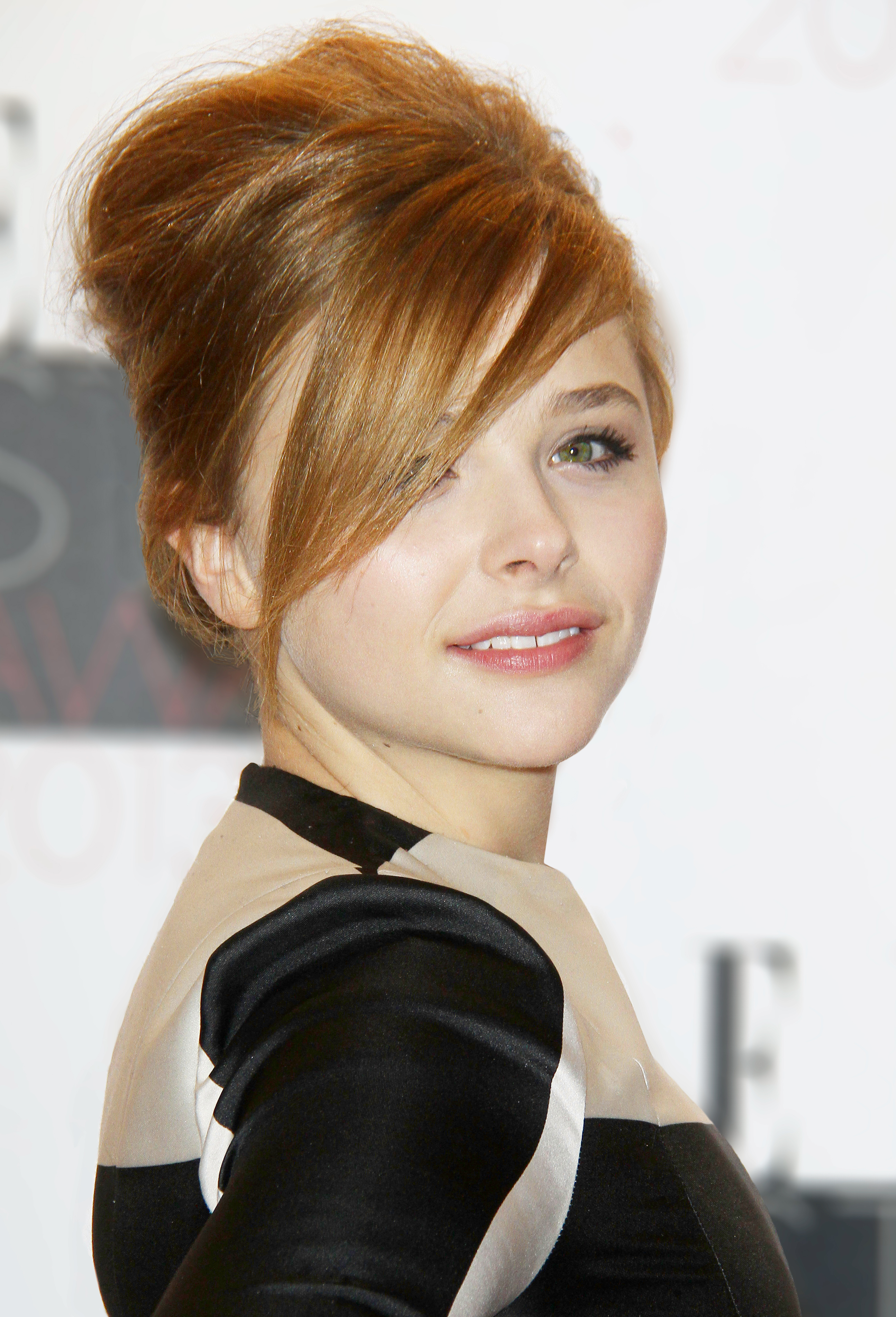
Moretz at the Elle Style Awards in 2013

In 2013, she reprised her role as Hit-Girl in the sequel Kick-Ass 2. The same year, she appeared in a short segment in the film Movie 43 and played the title character in Carrie, a remake of the 1976 film, directed by Kimberly Peirce.

Moretz has done voice work for video games. She reprised her role as Hit-Girl for Kick-Ass: The Game, and played young Lady Emily in Dishonored. When asked in October 2012 why she tends to gravitate towards playing darker, troubled characters, Moretz responded that she has such a happy family life, and finds it challenging to play characters who are significantly different. From March 25 through April 27, 2014, Moretz made her Off-Broadway debut in The Library, directed by Steven Soderbergh.

Moretz played the protagonist, Mia, in the adaptation of Gayle Forman's If I Stay (2014). The story follows a 17-year-old classical musician as she deals with the aftermath of a catastrophic car accident involving her family and has an out-of-body experience. Critical response to the film was mixed; a 35% positive rating based on 122 reviews and an average rating of 5/10 garnered by Rotten Tomatoes was accompanied by a critics' consensus praising Moretz for giving the performance "her all". Moretz subsequently starred as Cassie Sullivan in The 5th Wave, an adaptation of the best-selling novel by Rick Yancey. The film was released in January 2016. Hannah Minghella of Sony Pictures said Moretz "embodies the heart, strength and determination that make Cassie such a compelling character."

=== 2016–2019: Reassessment ===
In April 2016, Moretz was chosen to serve as one of three members of the Narrative Short Film Competition jury for the Tribeca Film Festival, alongside Mike Birbiglia and Sheila Nevins. Also that year, she co-starred with Zac Efron and Seth Rogen in the film Neighbors 2: Sorority Rising, the sequel to Neighbors; and headlined the drama film Brain on Fire, based on the memoir Brain on Fire by Susannah Cahalan.

In November 2015, Moretz was attached to Shane Carruth's third film, The Modern Ocean. The ensemble cast includes Asa Butterfield, Anne Hathaway, Daniel Radcliffe and Keanu Reeves. Also in November, Moretz was announced as the star of Universal Studios' live-action version of Hans Christian Andersen's The Little Mermaid, to be written by Richard Curtis, though she later left the project.

In a 2016 interview with The Hollywood Reporter, Moretz revealed she had dropped out of all the unproduced film projects she was attached to. The only announced film this affected was The Little Mermaid, since several other films she was slated to appear in were already in post-production. She explained, "I want to reassess who I am and find myself within my roles again. I'm realizing that I can slow down." She said the workload that came from being in several films a year "was causing her to lose sight of [the reason] she started acting and instead focus on [her films' box office receipts]." She stated she would focus on producing, including two television projects. This was taken by some media outlets as Moretz taking a hiatus from acting, so in a later interview, she clarified that she was not taking time off, saying: "I'm just becoming more picky and particular about what roles I'm choosing. I think as an actor you have a huge opportunity to find yourself through the roles that you choose. I think it's my time, right now in my life, to figure out who I am and what I am and what I want and what this industry means... Why not sit back, slow down, realize I'm 19 and go, 'Hey, let's make stuff that really, really hits hard with who I am and helps me figure out what it means to be a 19-year-old actor who is just doing her thing.'"

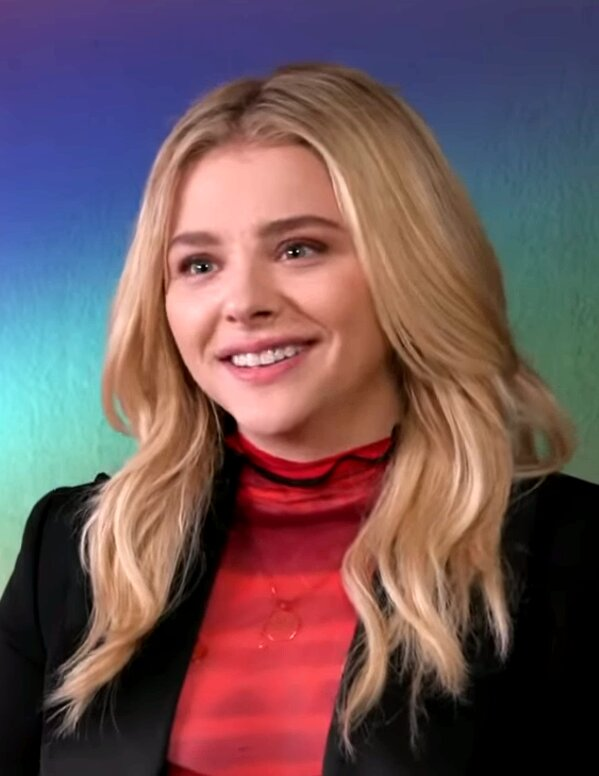
Moretz in 2018

In 2017, Moretz co-starred again with Ansel Elgort, in the crime drama November Criminals. That same year, she starred in the comedy-drama I Love You, Daddy, directed by Louis C.K. which had its world premiere at the Toronto International Film Festival, where it received negative reviews from critics. Following sexual misconduct allegations against C.K. the film's release was canceled by media company The Orchard, which had acquired U.S. distribution rights to the film as well as international distributors. In the aftermath of the scandal, Moretz stated, "I think it should just kind of go away, honestly. I don't think it's time for them to have a voice right now," referring to men accused of sexual misconduct. "Of course, it's devastating to put time into a project and have it disappear, [...] [b]ut at the same time, this [Me Too] movement is so powerful and so progressive that I'm just happy to be in communication with everyone and to see the big change in the face of the industry, which I think is very, very real."

In 2018, Moretz starred in the drama film The Miseducation of Cameron Post opposite Sasha Lane and Forrest Goodluck revolving around a teenage girl who is sent to a conversion camp. The film received positive reviews from critics, praising Moretz's performance. It had its world premiere at the Sundance Film Festival, where it won the Grand Jury Prize. The film was released on August 3, 2018, by FilmRise. She next appeared in the horror film Suspiria, a remake of the 1977 film of the same name directed by Luca Guadagnino which had its world premiere at the Venice Film Festival in September 2018. It received mixed reviews from critics, and performed poorly at the box office. She then starred opposite Isabelle Huppert in Greta, a thriller film, which had its world premiere at the Toronto International Film Festival in September 2018. It was released on March 1, 2019, by Focus Features.

=== 2019–present: emphasis on animated roles ===
In 2019, Moretz voiced Wednesday Addams in the CGI animated film The Addams Family, which received mixed reviews from critics. In 2021, she appeared in the live-action/animated film Tom & Jerry, directed by Tim Story; Shadow in the Cloud, a horror-thriller directed by Roseanne Liang, and the sequel The Addams Family 2. She signed on for a role in Mattson Tomlin's first film as director, Mother/Android, and featured as the lead in the Amazon Prime Video series The Peripheral based upon the William Gibson novel of the same name.

In 2021, Moretz executive-produced the six-part Snapchat Original series Coming Out highlighting young LGBTQ people. In an interview with The Advocate, she said, "I hope it is a show that will help to save lives by sharing what coming out means to each individual – that no single 'coming out' story is the same, each one is unique."

She voiced the title character in the animated film Nimona, which released on Netflix on June 30, 2023.

=== Fashion ===
Moretz has appeared in photo shoots, including editorials, features and covers, for magazines including Flaunt, Vogue, Teen Vogue, Jalouse, Marie Claire, Interview, Elle, Love, Crash Magazine, InStyle and many others. She has also been invited to various haute couture events, such as Dior Spring/Summer 2013 at Paris Fashion Week. Max Mara's signature in 2012 granted her the "Max Mara Face of the Future" award. In 2012, Moretz also became the face of American youth clothing retailer Aéropostale, appearing at various events, videos and reports. In February 2013, Elle magazine awarded her with the "Next Future Icon Award" at the Elle Style Awards gala held in London.

== Activism ==
Moretz has publicly supported LGBTQ equality. Moretz, who is gay, also has two gay brothers; she states that her brothers both coming out as gay had been "jarring" to their Baptist community and that they had initially tried to "pray the gay away" on their own before coming out to their family. She identifies as a feminist and has turned down film roles that she found to be overtly sexualized. She took on the role of a teenage prostitute in the 2014 film The Equalizer because her character "felt so real", rather than a "plot device". In October 2014, Moretz was named one of the 25 Most Influential Teens of the year by Time magazine.

In 2016, Moretz voiced her support for Democratic presidential candidate Hillary Clinton on the South Korean show The Brainiacs/Problematic Men. She also appeared as a speaker at the 2016 Democratic National Convention in July 2016, praising Clinton and encouraging young people to vote. Moretz supported Kamala Harris in the 2024 United States presidential election.

== Personal life ==
In March 2016, it was reported that the then-19-year-old Moretz had purchased her first home, a $3.4 million Spanish estate in Studio City, Los Angeles. Her brother Brandon serves as her business manager, and her brother Trevor has been her acting coach since 2010, often accompanying her on trips and press events when their parents were unavailable. Moretz is also an avid fan of the National Hockey League's (NHL) New York Islanders.

From 2014 to 2018, Moretz was in a relationship with Brooklyn Beckham, the son of David and Victoria Beckham.

In 2024, Moretz publicly came out as a "gay woman". In 2018, Moretz began dating model Kate Harrison, the daughter of actors Gregory Harrison and Randi Oakes. She and Harrison confirmed their engagement on January 1, 2025, and subsequently confirmed that they had married over the course of Labor Day weekend in an interview with Vogue, which reported the wedding on September 1, 2025.

== Filmography ==
=== Film ===
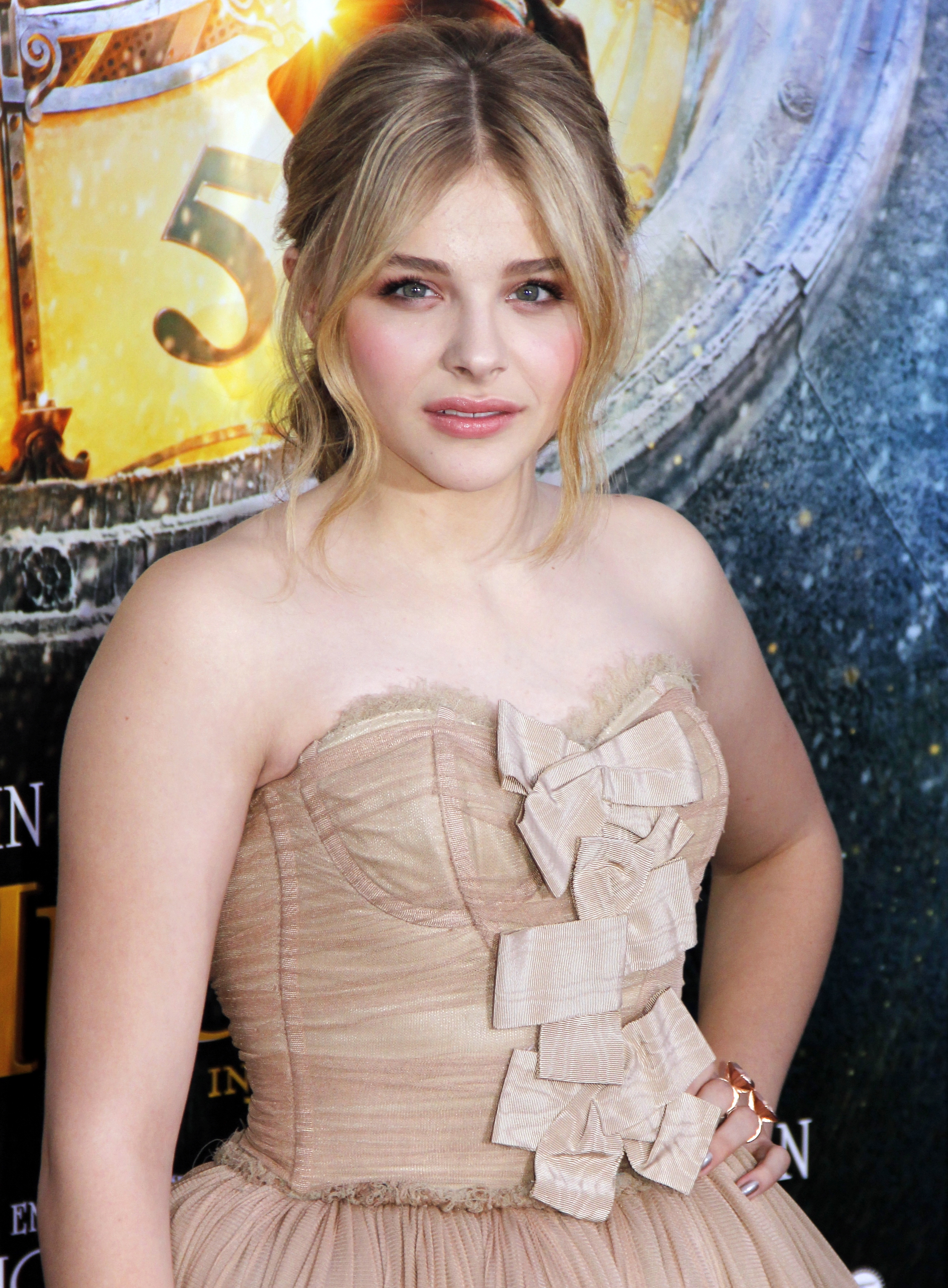
Moretz at the Hugo premiere in New York City in November 2011

Year	Title	Role	Notes
2005	The Amityville Horror	Chelsea Lutz	
2005	Heart of the Beholder	Molly	
2005	Today You Die	St. Thomas Hospital Girl	
2006	Big Momma's House 2	Carrie Fuller	
2006	Room 6	Melissa Norman	
2006	Wicked Little Things	Emma Tunny	
2007	Hallowed Ground	Sabrina	
2007	Super Sleuth Christmas Movie	Darby	Voice, direct-to-video
2007	The Third Nail	Hailey	
2008	The Eye	Alicia	
2008	The Poker House	Cammie	
2008	Bolt	Young Penny	Voice
2009	Not Forgotten	Toby Bishop	
2009	500 Days of Summer	Rachel Hansen	
2009	Jack and the Beanstalk	Jillian	
2009	Tigger & Pooh and a Musical Too	Darby	Voice, direct-to-video
2010	Super Duper Super Sleuths	Darby	Voice, direct-to-video
2010	Kick-Ass	Mindy McCready / Hit-Girl	
2010	Diary of a Wimpy Kid	Angie Steadman	
2010	Let Me In	Abby	
2011	Our Deal	Veronica	Short film
2011	Texas Killing Fields	Little Ann Sliger	
2011	Hick	Luli McMullen	
2011	Hugo	Isabelle	
2011	Scary Girl	Enid Krysinski	Short film
2012	Dark Shadows	Carolyn Stoddard	
2013	Movie 43	Amanda	Segment: "Middleschool Date"
2013	Kick-Ass 2	Mindy McCready / Hit-Girl	
2013	Carrie	Carrie White	
2013	Girl Rising	Narrator	Documentary
2014	Laggies	Annika	
2014	Muppets Most Wanted	Newspaper Delivery Girl	Cameo
2014	Clouds of Sils Maria	Jo-Anne Ellis	
2014	If I Stay	Mia Hall	
2014	The Equalizer	Alina / Teri	
2014	The Tale of the Princess Kaguya	The Princess Kaguya	Voice, English dub
2015	Dark Places	Young Diondra Wertzner	
2016	The 5th Wave	Cassie Sullivan	
2016	Neighbors 2: Sorority Rising	Shelby	
2016	Brain on Fire	Susannah Cahalan	
2017	I Love You, Daddy	China Topher	
2017	November Criminals	Phoebe "Digger"	
2018	The Miseducation of Cameron Post	Cameron Post	
2018	Suspiria	Patricia Hingle	
2018	Greta	Frances	
2019	Red Shoes and the Seven Dwarfs	Snow White	Voice
2019	The Addams Family	Wednesday Addams	Voice
2020	Shadow in the Cloud	Flight Officer Maude Garrett	
2021	Tom & Jerry	Kayla Forrester	
2021	Mother/Android	Georgia Olsen	
2021	The Addams Family 2	Wednesday Addams	Voice
2023	Nimona	Nimona	Voice
2025	Oh. What. Fun.	Taylor	
2026	Love Language	Lou	
2026	Found Alive	Reeve	
2027	Mister †	TBA	Filming

Key
†	Denotes works that have not yet been released

=== Television ===
Year	Title	Role	Notes
2004	The Guardian	Violet	2 episodes
2005	Family Plan	Young Charlie	Television film
2005	My Name Is Earl	Candy Stoker	Episode: "Broke Joy's Fancy Figurine"
2006	The Emperor's New School	Furi	Voice, episode: "Kuzcogarten"
2006–07	Desperate Housewives	Sherri Maltby	2 episodes
2007	The Cure	Emily	Pilot
2007–08	Dirty Sexy Money	Kiki George	7 episodes
2007–10	My Friends Tigger & Pooh	Darby	Voice, main role
2011–13	30 Rock	Kaylie Hooper	3 episodes
2013	American Dad!	Honey	Voice, episode: "Steve & Snot's Test-Tubular Adventure"
2015	Mickey Mouse Clubhouse	Boodles	Voice, episode: "Mickey's Monster Musical"
2019	Bojack Horseman	Self	Voice, episode: "The New Client"
2022	The Peripheral	Flynne Fisher	Main role

=== Stage ===
Year	Title	Role	Notes
2014	The Library	Caitlin Gabriel	The Public Theater
2025	Caroline	Maddie	MCC Theater

=== Music videos ===
Year	Song	Artist
2010	"Answer to Yourself"	The Soft Pack
2011	"Our Deal"	Best Coast
2011	"Ouch"	Dionne Bromfield featuring Mz Bratt

=== Video games ===
Year	Title	Voice role
2010	Kick-Ass: The Game	Mindy Macready / Hit-Girl
2012	Dishonored	Emily Kaldwin
2014	Kick-Ass 2: The Game	Mindy Macready / Hit-Girl
