= The Final Descent =

2013 horror novel by Rick Yancey

- First edition
- Author: Rick Yancey
- Series: The Monstrumologist
- Publisher: Simon & Schuster Books for Young Readers
- Publication date: September 2013
- Publication place: United States
- Media type: Print (hardcover), e-book
- Pages: 310 pp., illustrated
- ISBN: 978-1-4424-5153-7
- OCLC: 827262612
- LC Class: PZ7.1.H465 Fin 2013
- Preceded by: The Isle of Blood

The Final Descent is a horror novel by Rick Yancey, the fourth and final book in a series that he inaugurated in 2009 with The Monstrumologist (UK title, The Terror Beneath). It was published in September 2013 by Simon & Schuster Books for Young Readers, which recommends it for reader ages 14 and up, grades nine and up.

The U.S. Library of Congress catalogs The Final Descent as written by William James Henry and edited by Rick Yancey. Will Henry is the boy lead character of the series and William James Henry is a pseudonym of Rick Yancey.

== Synopsis ==
Fourteen-year-old Will Henry has gone through a lot of horrors with Dr. Warthrop at his side. This includes staring into hell (with hell returning the favor), being on the edge of death and more. But without Dr. Warthrop in the picture, the question is, is Will going to be able to navigate a monstrumological terror on his own? Everything comes crashing down for Will when Dr. Warthrop feels his protege is not being loyal anymore. He wants his 100 percent devotion and dedication back. So he leaves Will to face this on his own. Thus in the span of a mere 24 hours, Will's life lies in the balance. In the depths of Monstrumarium, he has to deal with a monster that is way worse than anything he or Dr. Warthrop could have imagined. This will determine both of their fates.

The book won a Gold Medal in the Florida Book Awards.

== See also ==
- The Curse of the Wendigo, book 2 of series
