= List of awards and nominations received by Chloë Grace Moretz =

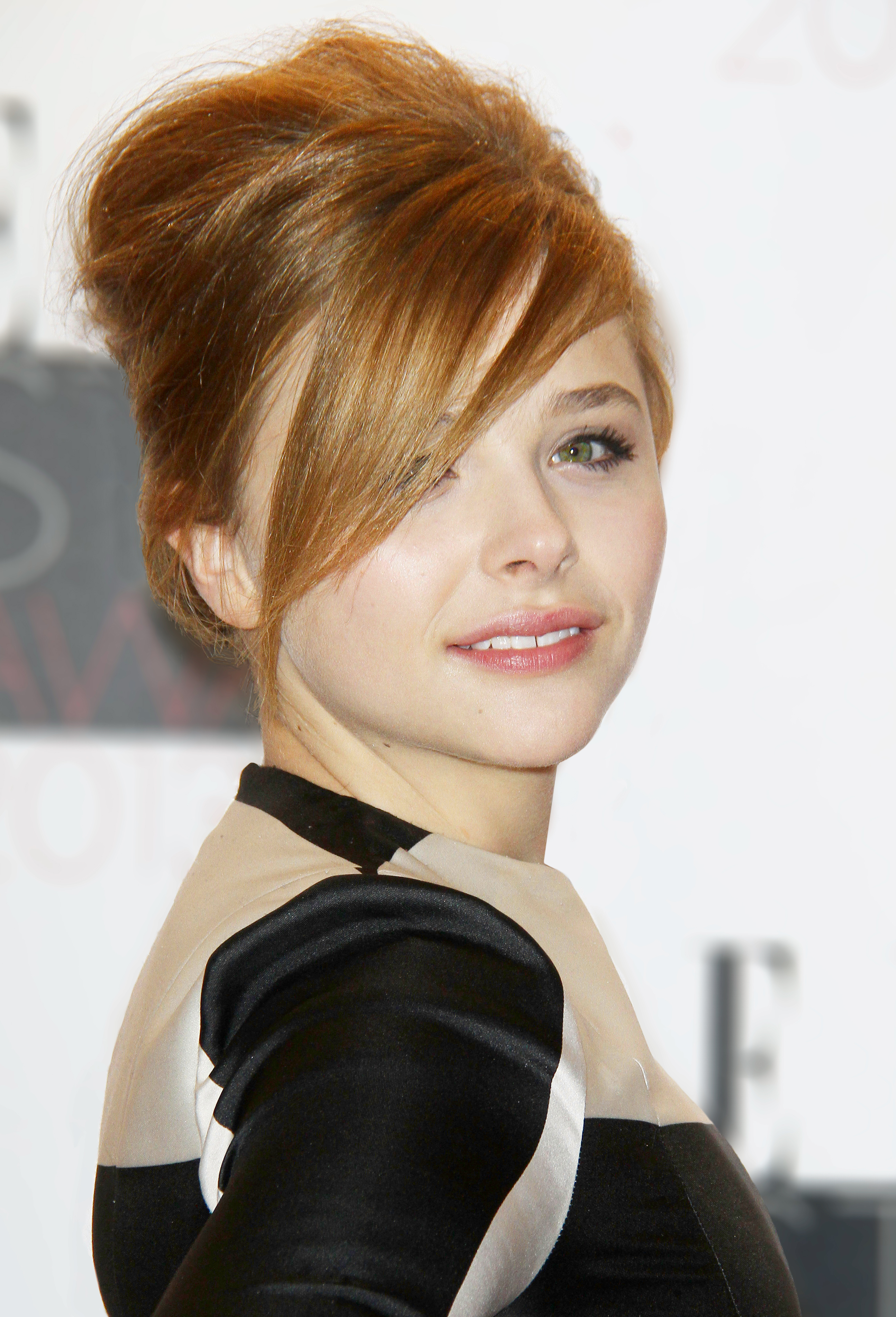
Moretz at the Elle Style Awards in 2013

American actress and model Chloë Grace Moretz has won multiple awards and nominations throughout her career. In 2006, she was nominated for "Best Performance in a Feature Film" for the Young Actress Age Ten or Younger category at the Young Artist Awards for her role in The Amityville Horror. She received the same nomination in 2007 for the film Big Momma's House 2 alongside a nomination for Best Performance in a TV Series - Guest Starring Young Actress for her role in Desperate Housewives.

Her 2010 superhero film Kick-Ass won her awards such as Best Breakthrough Performance – Female at the Scream Awards in 2010, Best Breakthrough Performance, Best Hero and Biggest Badass Star at the MTV Movie & TV Awards, and Best Newcomer at the Empire Awards in 2011. In the latter year, she also won seven awards including Best Performance by a Younger Actor (Saturn Award) and Best Horror Actress (Scream Awards) for her film Let Me In, and Best Performance in a Feature Film (Young Artist Award) for the film Diary of a Wimpy Kid.

She has won all but three of her nominated awards from 2012 to 2016. The film Hugo has won her the People's Choice Award Favorite Movie Star Under 25 and Young Artist Award for Best Leading Young Actress in a Feature Film in 2012, while Kick-Ass 2 won her the MTV Movie Award for Biggest Teen Bad Kicking Ass in 2013. She was also named Next Future Icon at the Elle Style Awards. At the Teen Choice Awards, Moretz has won awards for the films If I Stay and Neighbors 2: Sorority Rising in the categories of Drama and Comedy, respectively.

== Awards and nominations ==
Year	Award	Category	Nominated work	Result	Ref.
2023	Alliance of Women Film Journalists	Best Animated Female	Nimona	Nominated	
2024	Annie Awards	Outstanding Achievement for Voice Acting in an Animated Feature Production	Nimona	Won	
2024	Austin Film Critics Association Awards	Best Voice Acting/Animated/Digital Performance	Nimona	Nominated	
2011	Broadcast Film Critics Association Awards	Best Young Actress	Let Me In	Nominated	
2024	Critics' Choice Super Awards	Best Actress in a Superhero Movie	Nimona	Nominated	
2026	Drama League Award	Distinguished Performance	Caroline	Pending	
2013	Elle Style Awards	Elle Style Award for Next Future Icon	—N/a	Won	
2011	Empire Awards	Best Newcomer	Kick-Ass	Won	
2011	MTV Movie & TV Awards	Best Breakthrough Performance	Kick-Ass	Won	
2011	MTV Movie & TV Awards	Best Hero	Kick-Ass	Won	
2011	MTV Movie & TV Awards	Biggest Badass Star	Kick-Ass	Won	
2011	MTV Movie & TV Awards	Best Fight (shared with Mark Strong)	Kick-Ass	Nominated	
2013	MTV Movie & TV Awards	Biggest Teen Bad Kicking Ass	Kick-Ass 2	Won	
2012	People's Choice Awards	Favorite Movie Star Under 25	Hugo	Won	
2015	People's Choice Awards	Favorite Dramatic Movie Actress	—N/a	Won	
2014	People Magazine Awards	Next Generation Star	—N/a	Won	
2011	Saturn Awards	Best Performance by a Younger Actor	Let Me In	Won	
2012	Saturn Awards	Best Performance by a Younger Actor	Hugo	Nominated	
2013	Saturn Awards	Best Performance by a Younger Actor	Dark Shadows	Nominated	
2014	Saturn Awards	Best Performance by a Younger Actor	Carrie	Won	
2015	Saturn Awards	Best Performance by a Younger Actor	The Equalizer	Nominated	
2010	Scream Awards	Best Fantasy Actress	Kick-Ass	Nominated	
2010	Scream Awards	Best Superhero	Kick-Ass	Nominated	
2010	Scream Awards	Best Breakout Performance - Female	Kick-Ass	Won	
2011	Scream Awards	Best Horror Actress	Let Me In	Won	
2010	Teen Choice Awards	Choice Movie: Female Breakout	Kick-Ass	Nominated	
2015	Teen Choice Awards	Choice Movie Actress: Drama	If I Stay	Won	
2016	Teen Choice Awards	Choice Movie Actress: Comedy	Neighbors 2: Sorority Rising	Won	
2016	Teen Choice Awards	Choice Movie Actress: Sci-Fi/Fantasy	The 5th Wave	Nominated	
2023	Women Film Critics Circle Awards	Best Animated Female	Nimona	2nd Runner-up (Note: Shared with Leah Lewis for Elemental (2023))	
2012	Women in Film Crystal + Lucy Awards	Face of the Future	—N/a	Won	
2006	Young Artist Award	Best Performance in a Feature Film - Young Actress Age Ten or Younger	The Amityville Horror	Nominated	
2007	Young Artist Award	Best Performance in a Feature Film - Young Actress Age Ten or Younger	Big Momma's House 2	Nominated	
2007	Young Artist Award	Best Performance in a TV Series - Guest Starring Young Actress	Desperate Housewives	Nominated	
2008	Young Artist Award	Best Performance in a Voice-Over Role	My Friends Tigger & Pooh	Nominated	
2008	Young Artist Award	Best Performance in a TV series – Recurring Young Actress	Dirty Sexy Money	Nominated	
2010	Young Artist Award	Best Performance in a Feature Film - Supporting Young Actress	500 Days of Summer	Nominated	
2011	Young Artist Award	Best Leading Young Actress in a Feature Film	Kick-Ass	Nominated	
2011	Young Artist Award	Best Performance in a Feature Film	Let Me In	Nominated (Note: Shared with Kodi Smit-McPhee, Dylan Minnette and Jimmy "Jax" Pinchak.)	
2011	Young Artist Award	Best Performance in a Feature Film	Diary of a Wimpy Kid	Won (Note: Shared with Zachary Gordon, Robert Capron, Devon Bostick, Alex Ferris, Karan Brar, Laine MacNeil and Grayson Russell.)	
2012	Young Artist Award	Best Leading Young Actress in a Feature Film	Hugo	Won	
2014	Young Hollywood Awards	Fan Favorite Actor Female	—N/a	Won	
