= Rick Yancey =

American author

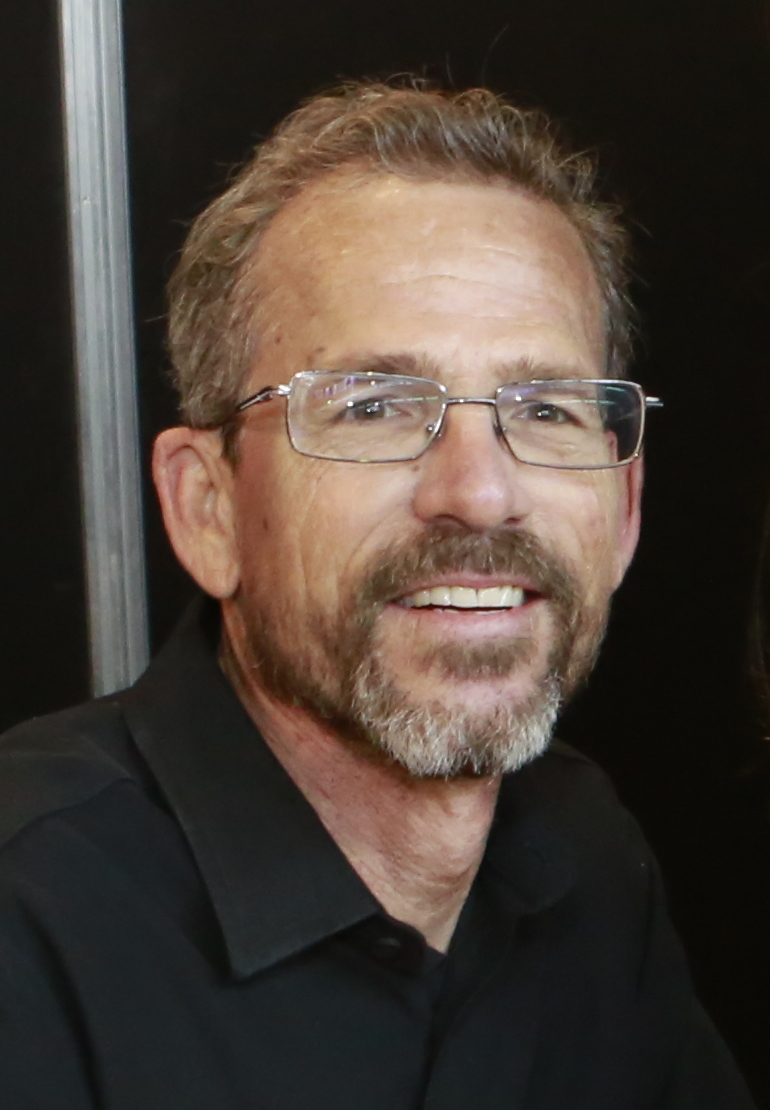
- Yancey in 2016
- Born: Miami, Florida, U.S.
- Education: Roosevelt University (BA)
- Occupation: Writer
- Writing career
- Period: 2003–present
- Genres: Fantasy, science fiction, horror
- Notable works: Alfred Kropp series The 5th Wave series The Monstrumologist
- Website: rickyancey.com

John Richard Yancey (born November 4, 1962) is an American author who writes works of suspense, fantasy, and science fiction aimed at young adults. His best known works include the Alfred Kropp series, The Monstrumologist series, and The 5th Wave series, which was adapted into a feature film of the same name in 2016.

== Early life and education ==
Yancey was born in Miami, Florida, but was adopted shortly after his birth and grew up in Lakeland, Florida. His adoptive father, Quillian Yancey, was an attorney and politician who served in the Florida House of Representatives for six years, while his mother was a legal secretary.

Yancey graduated from Lakeland Senior High School and studied at Florida Southern College for a year, where he majored in communications. He then spent a year at Florida State University before transferring to Roosevelt University in Chicago, where he received a Bachelor of Arts in English. He then moved back to Florida and enrolled in law school, where he spent a year before dropping out.

== Career ==
Yancey taught English classes and worked at a community theater before getting hired by the Internal Revenue Service in 1991, where he worked as a tax collector for the next twelve years, living primarily in Knoxville, Tennessee. His first novel was published in 2003, and he quit his job at the IRS the following year to write full-time.

Yancey has three adult children and resides in Gainesville, Florida, with his wife as of 2016.

== Bibliography ==
=== Novels ===
- A Burning in Homeland (2003)
- The Highly Effective Detective series:
  - The Highly Effective Detective (2006)
  - The Highly Effective Detective Goes to the Dogs (2008)
  - The Highly Effective Detective Plays the Fool (2010)
  - The Highly Effective Detective Crosses the Line (2011)

=== Young adult novels ===
- Alfred Kropp series:
  - The Extraordinary Adventures of Alfred Kropp (2005)
  - Alfred Kropp: The Seal of Solomon (2007)
  - Alfred Kropp: The Thirteenth Skull (2008)
  - The Alfred Kropp Files: The Unauthorized Notes from the Author (2009), short stories
- The Monstrumologist series:
  - The Monstrumologist (2009)
  - The Curse of the Wendigo (2010)
  - The Isle of Blood (2011)
  - The Final Descent (2013)
- The 5th Wave series:
  - The 5th Wave (2013)
  - The Infinite Sea (2014)
  - The Last Star (2016)

=== Children's books ===
- Empire Rising (2009)

=== Memoir non-fiction ===
- Confessions of a Tax Collector: One Man's Tour of Duty Inside the IRS (2004)

== Adaptations ==
- The 5th Wave (2016), film directed by J Blakeson, based on novel The 5th Wave
