= The Infinite Sea =

2014 novel by Rick Yancey

- Author: Rick Yancey
- Language: English
- Series: The 5th Wave series
- Genre: Science fiction
- Publisher: G. P. Putnam's Sons
- Publication date: September 16, 2014
- Publication place: United States
- Media type: Print (hardcover and paperback), e-book, audiobook
- Pages: 300 (hardcover)
- ISBN: 978-0-399-16242-8
- OCLC: 881848388
- LC Class: PZ7.Y19197 Inf 2014
- Preceded by: The 5th Wave
- Followed by: The Last Star

The Infinite Sea is a young adult science fiction romance novel written by American author Rick Yancey. Published in 2014, the novel is the second in The 5th Wave trilogy.

After fleeing from a camp established by aliens, 17-year-old Cassie Sullivan, her brother, and a squad of child soldiers attempt to prevent the extermination of the human race.

The novel provides detailed histories of the side characters from the previous novel. Instead of just narration from Cassie, the narration shifts from the point of view of Ringer, another teenage girl.

== Plot ==
A few weeks after the events of the first novel, Cassie, Ben, and the rest of Squad 53 have taken refuge at a hotel, which they call "Walker Hotel" in honor of Evan Walker, who is thought to be dead after destroying Camp Haven.

Ringer, believing that their refuge in the hotel will not last, goes out searching for a cave system mentioned in a brochure. Teacup, whom she had grown close to, sneaks up on Ringer who proceeds to shoot her, having mistaken Teacup for a Silencer. A helicopter flies in and they are both captured by The Others. While Cassie and the others anxiously await Ringer, they realize that Teacup has gone missing, and Dumbo and Poundcake set out to find her but return empty-handed.

Evan Walker is revealed to have survived and he has been rescued by Grace, a fellow Silencer, who tries to seduce him. Evan attacks her and, as he escapes, Grace shoots at him but lets him go. Both are attacked by child soldiers from Camp Haven and Grace is shot at, giving Evan the opportunity to escape.

Eventually, Evan finds the hotel where Cassie, Ben, and the rest of Squad 53 are staying at. As a consequence of a misunderstanding, a fight breaks out between them. In the midst of this, they hear a helicopter approach; however, it quickly flies off. Then, they see a small girl walking down the hallway, whom Sammy identifies as "Megan". Megan says that her throat hurts before passing out.

The group cares for her, though Evan warns them not to, explaining that The Others planted a bomb in her throat. Cassie and Evan stay behind to remove the bomb from her throat.

Grace appears as Cassie and Evan finish the operation. She forcefully kisses Evan in front of Cassie. The squad arrives and chaos ensues. Evan tells Cassie of a pod sent down from the mothership to extract Grace that will be her temporary home. Sammy takes the bomb they removed from Megan's throat as he rushes by on his way out. Evan makes Cassie promise "to end it" and insists that he be left behind. As she knows she has no other choice, Cassie kisses him and leaves.

When Cassie catches up with Sammy a short distance away from the hotel, he tells her he dropped the bomb. Unable to carry him, the group leaves a mortally wounded Poundcake and continues to move away from the hotel. Poundcake finds the lost explosive device, and blows it up, demolishing the hotel and killing both himself and Grace. Cassie thinks Evan has died in the explosion.

Ringer is taken to another "training" camp, much like Camp Haven, with Colonel Vosch having taken over command of the camp. Ringer semi-befriends a recruit named Razor, who knows of the conspiracy and that the officials at camp are actually The Others. Ringer asks Vosch about the whereabouts of Teacup and Vosch tells her she is alive. Vosch, Razor, and a woman named Claire enhance her with the 12th system, a piece of Other technology designed to strengthen human anatomy.

Ringer and Razor conspire to escape. The plan is carried out successfully and Ringer forces a pilot to fly them, Jumbo and Teacup in a helicopter. Before it crashes, the pilot, Razor, and Teacup bail out. Ringer jumps out and lands in an ice-covered lake.

After meeting at the crash site, Ringer soon discovers that Razor was secretly working with Vosch. She knocks him out and heads to the warehouse, which had been converted to a hospital at the time of the 3rd Wave. She finds Vosch in it, who reveals that Silencers are not actually "Others". They are just humans enhanced by the 12th system neural chip that contains a constructing program to make them believe they are "Others". It is unclear if Vosch is human. Razor is charged with guarding and helping to heal Ringer; eventually, they reconcile.

When they return to base, Vosch questions Ringer about what the "solution" is. She states that the "Others" don't mean to exterminate all humans. Vosch states that the "Others" could have simply eliminated all humans by dropping a big rock on them and hints there is a specific goal to be gained through the wave attacks. Vosch tells Ringer he has enhanced her to hunt down and kill Walker, and that he needs someone like her because the destroyed drones were meant to track the enhanced humans, not normal humans. Razor whispers to Ringer about the leverage Vosch has on her because of Teacup and proceeds to shoot and kill Teacup. In return, Razor is shot and dies. The chaos gives Ringer a chance to escape by diving out a window.

In the end, Cassie and squad 53 are recovering from the explosion. From the woods, Evan emerges and Cassie goes to meet him.

== Reception ==
- Publishers Weekly states the ending of the book "both shatters and uplifts."
- Kirkus Reviews calls it "A roller-coaster ride of a sequel."
- The Guardian rates it 4.5 stars.
