= Quillian Yancey =

American politician (1922–2005)

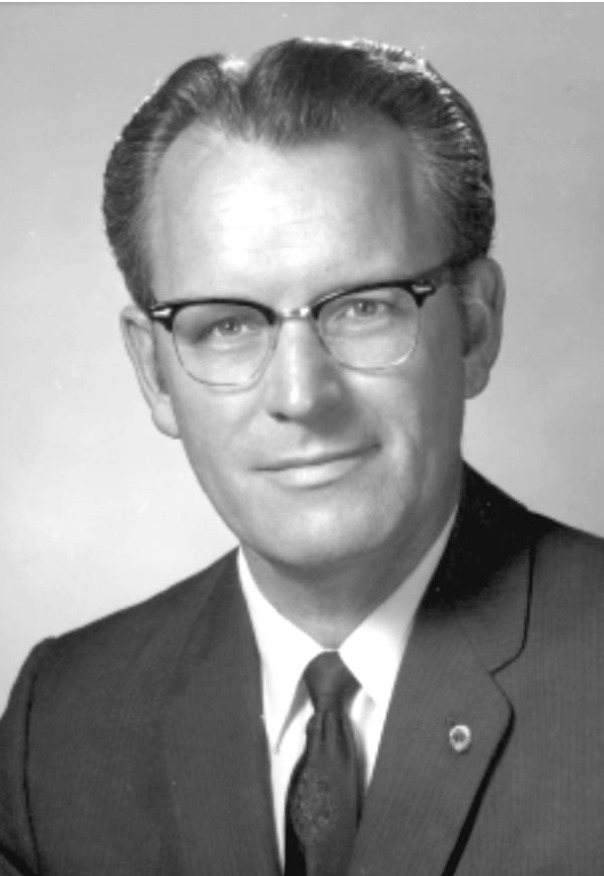
Yancey in 1966

Quillian S. Yancey (September 6, 1922 – January 3, 2005) was an American politician in Florida.

Yancey served in Europe with the United States Army during World War II. After the war ended, he graduated from Florida Southern College in 1949, and later from the George Washington Law School. He was an FBI agent in New York City and Washington D.C.

Yancey, a member of the Democratic Party, served in the Florida House of Representatives from 1966 until 1972. He served as a sheriff in Polk County in 1976, and was elected state attorney that year. He defeated Charles T. Canady for a state senate seat in 1990, and chose not to run for reelection in 1992.

He lived in Lakeland, Florida where he owned a 260 acre ranch in North Lakeland. He and his wife Norma H. Yancey had two sons and a daughter. Author Rick Yancey is one of their sons. Yancey died on January 3, 2005, at the age of 82.
