= The Monstrumologist =

2009 novel by Rick Yancey

- First edition cover
- Author: Rick Yancey
- Language: English
- Series: The Monstrumologist series
- Genre: Gothic horror
- Publisher: Simon & Schuster Children's Publishing
- Publication date: September 22, 2009
- Publication place: United States
- Media type: Print (hardcover and paperback), e-book, audiobook
- Pages: 434 pp
- ISBN: 978-1-4169-8448-1
- OCLC: 764442781
- LC Class: PZ7.Y19197 Mon 2009
- Followed by: The Curse of the Wendigo

The Monstrumologist is a young adult horror novel written by American author Rick Yancey. It was published on September 22, 2009 by Simon & Schuster Children's Publishing. It is the first book in The Monstrumologist series, followed by The Curse of the Wendigo. The story follows Will Henry, an orphaned assistant to Dr. Pellinore Warthrop, a man who specializes in monstrumology, the study of monsters.

The novel received the 2010 Michael L. Printz Honor Award for excellence in young adult literature.

== Reception ==
The review in Publishers Weekly said, "Yancey's elegant depiction of an America plagued with monsters, human and otherwise, spares no grisly detail. ... Horror lovers will be rapt." The reviewer in the School Library Journal wrote "Though the pace sometimes falters beneath the weight of Will's verbose observations, the author folds surprising depth and twists into the plot and cast alike, crafts icky bits that can be regarded as comically over-the-top (or not), and all in all dishes up an escapade fully 'capable,' as Will puts it, 'of fulfilling our curious and baffling need for a marauding horror of malicious intent'".

== Sequels ==
The monstrumologist had three subsequent books in the saga. These books are The Curse of the Wendigo published in 2010, The Isle of Blood published in 2011 and The Final Descent in 2013.
