= Confessions of a Tax Collector =

2004 memoir by Richard Yancey

- Author: Richard Yancey
- Genre: non-fiction memoir
- Publisher: HarperCollins
- Publication date: 2004
- Publication place: United States
- Pages: 384
- ISBN: 978-0-06-055560-3
- OCLC: 54508743
- Dewey Decimal: 336.24/092 B 22
- LC Class: HJ2361 .Y36 2004

Confessions of a Tax Collector is a non-fiction memoir by author and former Internal Revenue Service (IRS) tax collector Richard Yancey. Published in 2004 by HarperCollins, the book is a memoir of the author's twelve years employed by the IRS. It received a positive review from Publishers Weekly, and The Wall Street Journal called it "one of the top five books ever written about taxes."
