= Alfred Kropp series =

Young adult novel series by Rick Yancey

The Alfred Kropp series is a trilogy of young adult fantasy novels written by American author Rick Yancey. The first book, The Extraordinary Adventures of Alfred Kropp, received a starred review from Publishers Weekly, was named a Publishers Weekly Best Children's Book of the Year and was a finalist for the Carnegie Medal. The second book, Alfred Kropp: The Seal of Solomon, received a positive review from Publishers Weekly and was released in May 2007. The third book, Alfred Kropp: The Thirteenth Skull, was already written and on the store shelves for sale, but was announced by Yancey in Publishers Weekly in April 2006.

== Books ==
=== Alfred Kropp: The Seal of Solomon ===
Alfred Kropp: The Seal of Solomon is the second novel in the series. A sequel to The Extraordinary Adventures of Alfred Kropp, it continues the story of Alfred Kropp, the beloved of the Archangel Michael, who is sent to retrieve the Great Seal of King Solomon who long ago used the seal to control and imprison the fallen angels of heaven in a sacred vessel that has held them safe for a millennium. Now both objects have been stolen. The agents of OIPEP, led by the mysterious Operative Nine, member of the OIPEP, have a plan to save the ancient artifacts, and the world. The book was released in May 2007 through Bloomsbury.

The book received a positive review in Publishers Weekly, which highlighted the "emotional core" of the novel.

=== Alfred Kropp: The Thirteenth Skull ===
Alfred Kropp: The Thirteenth Skull is third in the series. In this novel Alfred starts realizing many things about his life and why he does things. He is no longer the bumbling overweight Alfred Kropp readers met in the first book.
