= The Library (play) =

2014 play by Scott Z. Burns

- Original language: English
- Written by: Scott Z. Burns

Premiere
- Date: March 25, 2014

The Library is a 2014 play written by Scott Z. Burns concerning the aftermath of a school shooting that takes place in the school library. It was inspired by Dave Cullen's book Columbine about the Columbine High School massacre.

The original production ran from March 25 to April 27, 2014, at the Public Theater in New York City, directed by Steven Soderbergh and starred Chloë Grace Moretz.

== Plot ==
The play centers on Caitlin Gabriel, a high-school student in an unnamed town who survives a school shooting, then struggles to relay her version of events against eyewitness reports from fellow survivors that she informed the shooter, who is based on Eric Harris and Dylan Klebold, where other students had hidden. Even her own parents accept media reports of this accusation, which spark widespread revulsion towards her in the aftermath of the shooting.

== Cast ==
- Chloë Grace Moretz
- Ben Livingston
- Michael O'Keefe
- Daryl Sabara
- Lili Taylor
- David Townsend
- Tamara Tunie
- Jennifer Westfeldt

== Reception ==
Ben Brantley described the play as a "sound-and-light tsunami" that "leans without mercy on our alarm buttons" and when the panic subsides, "like the characters onstage, we’re left looking for patterns in the chaos." Playwright Burns doesn't make the mistake of trying to find clear motivations for that crime, but considers how such events warp and contaminate those who survive them. The culprit is "a media-driven culture that searches for instant heroes, while turning tragedy into profit as fast as it can." Disaster brings out both pettiness and heroic traits, and The Library tantalizes with seemingly incidental details, such as Caitlin's self-doubt and the possibility that she knew the shooter more than the play exposes.

== Production ==
The Library is loosely based on Dave Cullen's book Columbine about the Columbine High School massacre. Producers Kathleen Kennedy and Frank Marshall briefly acquired the theatrical rights to Cullen's book, initially with the intention of turning it into a feature film by director David Fincher. The producers ultimately decided against turning the book into a film about the Columbine massacre. Instead, they adapted the book into a play which incorporated themes from the book.

== Possible future ==
Producers Kathleen Kennedy and Frank Marshall have expressed their intention to put the play on in other cities across the United States, and possibly around the world. They also discussed the possibility of adapting the play into a series for HBO.
