= The Last Star (novel) =

2016 novel by Rick Yancey

- Author: Rick Yancey
- Language: English
- Series: The 5th Wave series
- Genre: young adult, science fiction
- Publisher: G. P. Putnam's Sons
- Publication date: May 24, 2016
- Publication place: United States
- Media type: Print (hardcover and paperback), e-book, audiobook
- Pages: 338
- ISBN: 978-0-399-16243-5
- OCLC: 994855080
- LC Class: PZ7.Y19197 Las 2016
- Preceded by: The Infinite Sea

The Last Star is a young adult science fiction romance novel written by American author Rick Yancey. It was published on May 24, 2016, by G. P. Putnam's Sons. It is the third and final novel in The 5th Wave trilogy, preceded by The Infinite Sea.

The Last Star concludes the story of 16-year-old Cassiopeia "Cassie" Sullivan, battling against the aliens that have invaded Earth. Unlike the previous books, the book received mixed-to-negative reviews from reviewers, who criticized the book's ending.

== Summary ==
The story opens with a flashback of Cassie Sullivan's father as a child on a school field trip to a planetarium, where he is inspired to name his future daughter Cassiopeia.

In the present, the remaining human population tries to avoid run-ins with the "Others", the aliens that have wiped out most of humanity. A band of survivors hides in caves near Urbana, Ohio. One of them, a priest, turns out to be a Silencer. After killing the humans, the Silencer sits back to wait for the day the alien mothership drops the Final Wave, the green bombs that will complete the destruction of humanity and complete the Others' plans for Earth.

Ringer, enhanced by Vosch with the 12th System, returns to eliminate the defected Silencer, Evan Walker. Vosch gives her a suicide pill for emergencies and sends her and another Silencer, Constance, into the caverns to find him.

Meanwhile, Cassie, Sam (Nugget), Ben (Zombie), and the rest of Squad 53 are in a safe house when Evan joins them. Later, Zombie and Dumbo enter the caverns to warn Ringer and Teacup about the impending Final Wave, but Dumbo gets shot in the back during an attack. He is hidden in a building in Urbana by Zombie.

In the caverns, Constance disappears, and Ringer fights a Silencer priest. Zombie falls into a pit of corpses but is rescued by Constance, who then kills the priest. The trio heads back to Urbana to find Dumbo, but he dies from blood loss. Zombie honours him by marking his grave with colored flags.

The trio returns to the safe house, where Constance takes Nugget hostage and demands Evan come with her to Vosch. Nugget shoots Constance, but her enhancements keep her alive until Ringer and Nugget shoot her again to confirm she’s dead. Ringer warns that Vosch will notice Constance’s implant is offline and send a helicopter of 5th Wave troops to capture Evan and kill the others. Evan volunteers to return to Vosch.

As the helicopter approaches, everyone hides in the basement. Ringer and Evan take down several attackers, who turn out to be from Ringer’s old squad. Evan is captured, leading Ringer to plan an ambush for the incoming soldiers. She tells Zombie that she is pregnant with Razor’s child, a soldier who helped her escape Vosch.

When the second helicopter arrives, they kill the soldiers, capture the pilot, and leave an injured Zombie to guide Nugget and Megan to the caves. Ringer then forces the pilot to take them to Vosch’s base.

At the base, Vosch reveals to Evan that the Others have wiped out dominant species on countless planets to save the remaining life. The 5th Wave will bomb every city, erasing humanity and forcing survivors into a permanent Stone Age, while Vosch will escape to the mothership as an immortal consciousness. He reprograms Evan to eliminate humanity, turning him into a cold killer with orders to take out Ringer.

Meanwhile, a helicopter squad attacks Zombie, Nugget, and Megan, killing Zombie. Ringer and Cassie infiltrate the base, with Cassie changing into a soldier’s uniform. Ringer detonates a bomb, allowing Cassie to blend in with the troops. As they approach the control centre, General Order Four activates, releasing poison from the sprinklers that burns Cassie's skin. She panics and rushes outside to wash it away.

In the Urbana caves, Zombie wakes up to a sergeant demanding Ringer’s location while holding Nugget hostage. The squad takes Nugget, Zombie, and Megan to their base. Meanwhile, Ringer swaps clothes with Cassie, knowing the poison won’t affect her. They head to the base's computer core to find Evan, but Cassie accidentally downloads the memories of 10,000 individuals, gaining access to the facility’s layout. Ringer encounters Evan, who brutally injures her, breaking her back. She tells Cassie to run, but Evan tracks her to a flooded room, where Ringer electrocutes him with a live wire.

Vosch finds the paralyzed Ringer and claims he created her, inviting her onto the mothership. She refuses until Cassie shows up and shoots him. Cassie tells Ringer she killed Evan, but Ringer insists he was already gone. Cassie then opens a hidden door to Vosch’s escape pod and leaves, while Ringer searches for an explosive pill to destroy the base.

Meanwhile, Zombie, Nugget, and Megan are in a helicopter circling the base when the soldiers suddenly die, forcing them to jump into a river to survive the crash. As they approach the base, they spot a green light launching toward the mothership.

Cassie finds the explosive pill in her pocket, recognising it as the same type Megan had, activated by carbon dioxide from a person’s breath. The escape pod docks on the mothership, loaded with high explosives meant for Earth’s cities. She recites her and Sammy’s bedtime prayers one last time before sacrificing herself to destroy the ship. The zombie watches as a massive explosion erupts from the mothership before it disappears. He then finds Ringer paralysed in the hallway and understands that Cassie gave her life.

Months later, Zombie and Nugget find themselves in a Texas toy store, where they encounter a wounded soldier clutching his side with one hand tucked into his shirt—just like Cassie had in the first book. Nugget wants to kill him, but Zombie talks him down and tries to communicate with the man, who instead pulls a gun and takes his own life. They return to a house where Ringer is caring for her newborn daughter, Cassie. Outside, Evan Walker is on patrol—the 12th System saved him from electrocution, and his friends restored his memories, bringing back his humanity. Evan tells Zombie he’s planning to hunt down and destroy as many 5th Wave military bases as he can, believing that for every life he takes, two more will be spared. As Evan leaves, Nugget watches from the house and asks Zombie about the constellation named for his sister. Zombie explains that three of its stars form the throne of Cassiopeia, from which Cassie now watches over her realm.

== Reception ==
- Entertainment Weekly calls the action intense, and gives it a B+.
- The New York Times calls it "Wildly entertaining".
- Kirkus Reviews calls it "A haunting, unforgettable finale".
- Publishers Weekly stated "the ending provides both satisfaction and heartbreak".
