= The 5th Wave (novel) =

2013 novel by Rick Yancey

- First edition cover
- Author: Rick Yancey
- Cover artist: Allied Integrated Marketing
- Language: English
- Series: The 5th Wave series
- Genre: young adult, science fiction,dystopian
- Publisher: G. P. Putnam's Sons
- Publication date: May 7, 2013
- Publication place: United States
- Media type: Print (hardcover and paperback), e-book, audiobook
- Pages: 457
- ISBN: 978-0-399-16241-1
- OCLC: 999590913
- LC Class: PZ7.Y19197 Aah 2013
- Followed by: The Infinite Sea

The 5th Wave is a young adult science fiction novel written by American author Rick Yancey. It was published on May 7, 2013, by G. P. Putnam's Sons. The novel is the first in the 5th Wave trilogy, followed by The Infinite Sea and The Last Star. The story follows 16-year-old Cassie Sullivan as she tries to survive in a world devastated by waves of alien invasions that decimated the Earth's population.

Sony Pictures released a film adaptation in January 2016.

== Plot ==
An alien invasion consisting of four "waves" of increasing severity has resulted in the death of most of the human population, with survivors scattered in mostly rural areas. As part of the fourth wave, the aliens, known as the "Others", physically imitate human forms and hunt down the rest of the human population. Such aliens are called "Silencers".

16-year-old Cassie Sullivan searches for her brother, five-year-old Sammy. While traveling, she is shot by a Silencer. Meanwhile, Cassie's high school crush Ben Parish is coerced into joining the army by Commander Vosch, who killed Cassie's father prior to the events of the novel. He joins Squad 53 and becomes known as Private Zombie.

Cassie awakes in a country house mostly healed. Her savior is a man named Evan Walker, who claims he found her delirious on the highway. The two develop a romance, and Evan agrees to help her find her brother. Cassie harbors suspicions of how he came to find her, however, and suspects him of being the Silencer that tried to kill her. Meanwhile, Sammy has been recruited into the army and joins Zombie's squad with other child soldiers. The squad rises through the ranks and becomes one of the best in the camp. While the army purports to be fighting the Others, they soon discover that they have been tricked into targeting fellow human survivors. This is revealed to be the fifth wave.

Cassie and Evan are attacked by a group of soldiers from the camp. Evan defeats them easily, and he admits that he is a Silencer as Cassie suspected. Conflicted, she eventually agrees to let him help rescue Sammy. Cassie infiltrates the camp and meets her brother and Zombie, but they are captured by Vosch. They are rescued by Evan, who is revealed to have planted bombs throughout the camp. The group, along with the rest of Squad 53, ride off as the camp detonates.

== Reception ==
Critical reception of the book was fairly positive, although some reviewers noted an overreliance on genre tropes.

It received starred reviews from Publishers Weekly and Kirkus. Justin Cronin of The New York Times wrote that while "just about everything here is borrowed from one venerable pop culture source or another", it was a "rip-roaring setup, and as the bodies accumulate, the pages turn themselves." The critic Katherine Schulten listed it as one of the best young adult books of 2013.

== Sequels ==
The 5th Wave is the first book in a trilogy. The second book in the series, The Infinite Sea, was released on September 16, 2014. The third book in the series, The Last Star, was released on May 24, 2016.

== Film adaptation ==
A film adaption with the same name was released by Columbia Pictures on January 22, 2016. It was directed by J Blakeson, with a screenplay by Susannah Grant, Akiva Goldsman, and Jeff Pinkner.
