= The Curse of the Wendigo =

2010 novel by Rick Yancey

- First edition
- Author: Rick Yancey
- Series: Monstrumologist
- Published: 2010, Simon & Schuster
- Media type: Print, ebook, audiobook
- Pages: 448 pages
- ISBN: 141698450X
- Preceded by: The Monstrumologist
- Followed by: The Isle of Blood

The Curse of the Wendigo is a 2010 young adult horror novel by Rick Yancey. It was first published on October 12, 2010 through Simon & Schuster and is the second book in Yancey's Monstrumologist series.

== Synopsis ==
The book follows Dr. Warthrop, a scientist trying to debunk theories that vampires could possibly exist. He's drawn from his research by his former fiancé, who pleads with him to save her husband from the flesh eating Wendigo. Not believing that such a creature could exist, Warthrop ventures out and succeeds in saving his ex's husband, only for the man to then transform into a Wendigo himself. Warthrop and Will Henry are then forced to hunt and destroy the creature.

== Reception ==
Critical reception for The Curse of the Wendigo has been mostly positive and the book received starred positive reviews from Kirkus Reviews, Publishers Weekly and Booklist. The School Library Journal commented that the book worked well as a standalone text and the reviewer marked it as one of her favorite book reads for 2010. HorrorNews.net gave a more mixed review, saying that it "may not be as good as The Monstrumologist or really even a worthy follow up, but it is a book that deserves to have a second look if you did not like it after the first read like I did."
