= The 5th Wave (series) =

Young adult book trilogy by Rick Yancey

The 5th Wave Series
- Cover of the first book in the series
- The 5th Wave (2013); The Infinite Sea (2014); The Last Star (2016)
- Author: Rick Yancey
- Country: United States
- Language: English
- Genre: Post-apocalyptic, science fiction
- Publisher: G. P. Putnam's Sons
- Published: 2013–2016
- Media type: Print (hardcover and paperback), audiobook, e-book
- No. of books: 3

The 5th Wave is a trilogy of young adult post-apocalyptic sci-fi novels written by American author Rick Yancey. The series started in May 2013 with the first book, The 5th Wave, which was later turned into a film. A sequel titled The Infinite Sea was published in 2014. The trilogy concluded in 2016 with the final book, The Last Star. In 2018, The 5th Wave: 5th Year Anniversary was published with additional chapters.

"The 5th Wave" trilogy centers around characters surviving an alien invasion which came in 'waves', killing a majority of the human population. The series has multiple main characters, and the story is told from different viewpoints throughout the series. The first four waves are called "Lights Out", "Surf's Up", "Pestilence", and "Silencers". Each brings forth a new issue that the protagonists must face and learn to adapt to in order to survive. The first book in the series mainly follows Cassie Sullivan as she searches for her brother Sam Sullivan. Along the way she meets Evan Walker who helps with her search. Over time, Cassie and Evan's relationship turns romantic.

The first book was developed into a 2016 film. The film starred Chloë Grace Moretz, Zackary Aruthur, and Alex Roe. It made 10,326,356 American dollars in the boxoffice during its opening weekend. However, the second and third books within the trilogy did not receive a film adaptation.

== Premise ==
In the year 2013, the earth is systematically attacked by a group of aliens known as "The Others". They exist in an unknown form and attack through a series of "waves" as their mothership orbits the planet:

=== The First Wave: "Lights Out" ===
A powerful electromagnetic pulse is emitted by the Others, causing the immediate failure of all technology. Planes crash, cellphones go out, and automobiles cease function. The estimated death toll is about 500,000.

=== The Second Wave: "Surf's Up" ===
Due to the large concentration of the human population near to coastlines, the Others drop large metal rods "twice as tall as the Empire State Building and three times as heavy" onto the earth's major fault lines. The resulting tsunamis obliterate every ocean front and raise sea levels dramatically. The estimated death toll is roughly 40% of the surviving population.

=== The Third Wave: "Pestilence" ===
Using the earth's birds as carriers, the Others spread a deadly virus thought to be a modified strain of Ebola. As the virus progresses, symptoms slowly deteriorate from a fever and cough to profuse bleeding from every orifice. The Pestilence claims an estimated 97% of the remaining survivors.

=== The Fourth Wave: "Silencers" ===
After being "implanted" by the Others prior to the Arrival, people infested with alien consciousnesses are tasked with killing the remaining humans.

After the first four waves decimate the human population, those who remain are terrified and desperately clinging to hope. As humanity awaits the arrival of a new Fifth Wave, one that will supposedly wipe the human race off the planet, distrust is shown as people realize the existence of fifth column imposters in their midst, imposters intent on thwarting any possible plan for human retaliation. Which causes the remaining survivors not to trust anyone they come across, whether they are friends or foe.

== Origins ==
Yancey stated in an interview with Lightspeed Magazine that the basis for The 5th Wave came from a question he asked his wife about her worst fears. "It was one of those three a.m. conversations where your mind starts going, and I asked her, on the spur of the moment, 'What is your greatest fear?' She said, without hesitation, 'Alien abduction.'" Yancey continued on, telling how he developed the plot for the series. "It was basically trying to think like an alien, and considering the fact that if they are out there, they probably wouldn't attack without getting to know us very, very well. They would learn how we think, they would learn about what do humans do in times of crisis, and they would turn that to their own advantage. So, when I was working through how the attacks might work, I realized first that it couldn't just be one attack—the world’s too big—you'd have to do it in stages, or waves." The first book was officially published on May 7, 2013.

== Books ==
=== The 5th Wave ===
The 5th Wave is the first book in the series and was released on May 7, 2013.

The book opens in the midst of the Fourth Wave and follows Cassie's quest to find her brother, Sammy, after he is taken by U.S. Army soldiers, the same soldiers that killed her dad. Cassie is shot by an Other-affiliated sniper, a "Silencer", from the woods on her trek, and is later rescued by Evan Walker, who nurses her back to health and agrees to help her find her brother. Meanwhile, Sammy arrives at Wright-Patterson AFB, which is now a "training camp" called Camp Haven. It is revealed over the course of the story that the soldiers are 'recruiting' children into an army, under the guise of them being the last hope for fighting back against the Others. Sammy is placed in Squad 53 and befriends squadmate Ben Parish, Cassie's long-lost crush from high school. After the two set out to find Sammy, Cassie and Evan are attacked by a squad from Wright-Patterson, and, after seeing how easily Evan dispatches them, Cassie finds out that Evan was the Silencer who originally shot her. He then helped her because he had fallen in love and couldn't bring himself to kill her. The two, though uneasily, coordinate a plan to extract Sammy then begin executing it. While deployed, Ben and his squadmate Ringer learn that Wright-Patterson is actually run by the Others and it's revealed they are masquerading as a resistance force, abducting and training human children, which they will deploy as the Fifth Wave to end humanity. Ben and Ringer escape with the rest of Squad 53, but Ben insists on going back for Sammy, who was left on base due to his age.

Ben and Cassie both enter the base, meeting again and joining each other. They find Sammy but are thwarted by the acting commander of the base, Colonel Alexander Vosch. Evan saves them and says his goodbyes to Cassie before he detonates bombs that level the base, though he is lost in the process. Cassie, Ben, and Sammy ride off with Squad 53 as Wright-Patterson is destroyed.

The book was adapted into a film by J Blakeson and Columbia Pictures, under the title The 5th Wave and was released on January 22, 2016. After box office performance was poorer than expected and heavy criticism as of January 11, 2022, there have been no further talks in making a sequel. However, Sony has not officially confirmed its cancellation of the movie series.

=== The Infinite Sea ===
The Infinite Sea is the second installment in the series, released on September 16, 2014.

The book becomes much more involved with the members of Squad 53 and the character Ringer. The group takes refuge in an old hotel near the ruins of Wright-Patterson, at Cassie's insistence that Evan is still alive, and the fact that he said to meet him there. Ringer sets out to find an alternate route, though it goes awry when she mistakes Teacup, a small girl of the squad, for a Silencer, shoots her, and is taken by an approaching army helicopter. Evan is revealed to have survived, having been rescued by another Silencer named Grace. Evan attempts to kill Grace after he finds out she is hunting Cassie, and though he fails, he manages to flee during an attack by hidden assailants. Evan finds the hotel Cassie is stationed at, though he is shot and knocked out in a misunderstanding with Squad 53. Cassie tends to him, while Ben angrily awaits his awakening. Later, a helicopter quickly flies over the hotel, and then a small girl, Megan, appears. Evan wakes up and warns them that she is rigged with a bomb that explodes when it comes into contact with human breath. The group removes the bomb. Grace appears and, after a violent confrontation, is killed when Private Poundcake detonates the bomb that was earlier in Megan near her Grace, also killing himself and destroying the hotel.

The second part of the story follows Private Ringer. She is taken to a base somewhere, similar to Wright-Patterson, and meets the alive-and-well Colonel Vosch. Vosch constantly thwarts her with mind games and preaches to her a philosophy that "rage is not the answer". She semi-befriends a recruit called Razor, who is aware that Vosch and the staff of the base are indeed the Others. Vosch installs Ringer with a piece of technology, the "twelfth system", that enhances her strength. He also reveals to Ringer that Silencers were never actually Others, just humans planted with fake memories and enhanced by the twelfth system with a link to the alien Mothership. It is concluded that there are only dozens of true Others in the world, and that the Mothership is the last remnant of their society programmed with the goal of eradicating humans. Ringer and Razor attempt to escape, though Razor secretly conspired with Vosch, and they were being monitored the entire time. Ringer learns, neutralizes Razor, and runs off, but not fast enough to evade Vosch, who incapacitates her. Razor is ordered to rejuvenate Ringer, though he does more and the two sleep together in a rough, hazy love. When they arrive back on base, Razor kills Teacup, whom Vosch used as a bargaining chip, in order to set Ringer free. Razor is shot dead, and Ringer escapes the base.

As the novel closes, Cassie and Squad 53 recover from the bomb that destroyed the hotel, when Evan, weak and exhausted, emerges from the woods.

The book was noted for its dark appeal and was released to the same good reception as its predecessor.

=== The Last Star ===
The Last Star, the third and final book in The 5th Wave series, was released on May 24, 2016.

The Fifth Wave is still commencing, or so the characters believe. Ringer and Evan know that once Vosch and the few Others are withdrawn from the surface, the Mothership will drop massive bombs to obliterate any trace of humanity. Cassie and Squad 53 settle in the dead Silencer Grace's former home. Ringer returns to Vosch knowing that he will kill Ben Parish and the rest of Squad 53 if she does not kill the persistently rebellious Evan Walker for him. She takes a helicopter to the town that the squad stationed themselves in and is attacked by a Silencer. She is met by Ben after the Silencer is killed, and the two head to the house. Ringer immediately attempts to kill Evan, but they are interrupted by an incoming helicopter. Evan realizes why Ringer intended to kill him and he submits and is taken.

The group devises a plan to save Evan and defeat the Others permanently. Cassie and Ringer infiltrate the base via a hijacked helicopter. Ringer detonates several bombs to incite chaos on the base, and, after many complications, they reach the command center of the base. Ben, having stayed behind to protect Sam and Megan, is attacked by a patrol and the three are taken back to the base. Cassie and Ringer attempt to find Evan's data on the CPU to locate him, though they do not know how to sift through each cell individually, and so Cassie downloads the data of every logged person to her own head to find it, subsequently learning the codes and layout of the base. Evan arrives, now completely devoid of humanity at the hands of the twelfth system. He fights Ringer and disables her easily, however, he's defeated by a live wire from Cassie. Ringer wakes up to see Vosch, who has become attached to her and wishes to bring her with him in his extraction pod. The conversation is only a decoy from Ringer, allowing Cassie to shoot and kill him from behind. Cassie then uses the knowledge she gained to open Vosch's escape pod and she ascends into the sky. Ringer takes a device from Vosch that will electrocute any soldier with a tracking implant in them, and activates it. Ben, Sam, and Megan dive out of their helicopter as the soldiers and pilot die, and they realize Cassie and Ringer must still be alive.

Cassie, now ascending to the Mothership, has a chance to glimpse the memories that she now has from tens of thousands of people. She begins to truly think about what humanity is worth, when the pod nears the Mothership. She takes out an explosive pill from her pocket that Vosch gave her, biting down and exploding the Mothership. Ben and the kids witness this to their sorrow and delight. They enter the base and find Ringer paralyzed on the floor.

Sometime later, the group has settled down in a house, living together as a family, and Evan (the twelfth system having kept him alive, and the group having restored his memories and humanity with the CPU) watches over them. Seeing no future for himself there, he sets off away from them, on a mission to get rid the world of the Others influence.

== Characters ==
=== Main characters ===
Cassiopeia "Cassie" Marie Sullivan - the main protagonist of the series. Her namesake is the constellation Cassiopeia. Both of her parents died in the first four waves. Her younger brother Sammy is taken by The Others to a "training camp" called Camp Haven, formerly, Wright-Patterson AFB. She is seventeen years old and is described as a short, strawberry-blonde girl with average features. She deeply cares for her brother, and in the end of the series, sacrifices herself to destroy the Mothership.

Evan Walker - a farm boy from rural Ohio. All of his family and girlfriend were killed in the Third Wave by the Red Death. Earlier in his life at a carnival, he meets Grace, who is the only person he finds to be like him, an Other. He saves Cassie after he shoots her, because could not bring himself to kill her. Cassie soon finds out that Evan is actually an Other and not truly human. He is described as being a tall boy, at least eighteen or nineteen years old, being very muscular with chocolate-brown eyes. He develops strong feelings for Cassie, and so does she. These feelings are strained when Cassie learns that Evan is an Other. Evan later improves his relationship with Cassie and dedicates himself to the cause of defeating the Others.

Benjamin "Ben" Thomas Parish or "Zombie" - a popular boy from Cassie's high school, who Cassie had a crush on. His family was killed during the first four waves by a group of psychotic looters. He is haunted by the fact that he ran while his baby sister was killed, and keeps a locket with a photo of her. He becomes a member of Camp Haven's makeshift army, taking the nickname "Zombie". He later leaves the camp after learning the truth and becomes a resistance fighter. He is enhanced with the 12th system later in the series, and has a competitive and romantic relationship with Ringer.

Marika "Ringer" - a member of Squad 53. Her father died of the Red Death. Marika wandered through the wilderness before forcefully being recruited into Camp Haven's army, where she took the nickname "Ringer". On their first patrol, she and Zombie find that Camp Haven's officials are actually The Others. She is described as having glossy black hair and mild Asian features. In The Infinite Sea, she grows closer to Private Teacup, and, after being captured, grows feelings for a recruit named Razor.

Sammy "Nugget" Sullivan - Cassie's five-year-old little brother. At his refugee camp, he boards a bus from Camp Haven and is recruited into its army, unaware of his father's death. He joins Squad 53 and friends Zombie deeply. Sammy is not allowed to go on his squad's patrol due to his age. He is rescued later from the camp.

=== Secondary characters ===
Lieutenant Colonel Alexander Vosch - The main antagonist though the trilogy. He leads the 5th wave bases and Silencers stationed across the world. Throughout the books he is steadily sadistic and cruel. First introduced by killing Cassie's father and gathering her brother Sam into a yellow school bus under the guise of safe keeping, he is showing brainwashing young people at Camp Haven, as part of the fifth wave. He later destroys Camp Haven, and kills thousands of children in the process.

Grace - a Silencer like Evan, programmed by the 12th System to believe she is a part of the immortal alien "Others" taking over. They befriended each other before the waves began. Grace saves Evan after finding him severely wounded in an escape pod. She is later killed when Poundcake detonates a bomb inside the hotel.

Dumbo - the twelve year old medical officer in Squad 53. One of his most prominent features is his extraordinarily large ears, like his namesake. He's known for his loyalty, risking himself for the other characters many times over throughout the series. Traveling through Urbana on a hopeless mission to save Teacup and Ringer, he dives into Zombie at the last second and takes a bullet to the back. Unable to stay Zombie leaves Dumbo with the promise to return with Ringer and Teacup. When he returns he finds Dumbo has crawled ten blocks away in delirium, looking for Zombie.

Allison "Teacup" or "Cup" - a seven-year-old member of Squad 53. She is described as "the meanest seven-year-old you've ever seen" by Zombie, she has even been noted to sleep with a gun in her hands. Teacup grows close to Ringer as the only other female in Squad 53, especially after the destruction of Camp Haven. She is shot by Ringer who mistakes her for an Other. Ringer surrenders to Vosch knowing it is the only way to save Teacup's life, and Vosch uses Teacup as leverage against Ringer. Teacup is killed by Razor so Vosch will have no more leverage against Ringer.

Poundcake - a chubby member of Squad 53 who is mostly silent. His mother was killed by the Red Death. While he was on a supply run, he returned to find his brother gone. On the supply run, he found only a sweet treat, his namesake, as his drill sergeant thought he was "so sweet". He sacrificed himself to save the others of his group by detonating a bomb rigged to detonate on high concentrations of carbon dioxide in close proximity to Grace, a Silencer targeting the group.

Megan - a seven-year-old girl rescued and taken to Camp Haven. She meets and befriends Sammy on the bus they ride. Megan is, along with many other kids her age that are part of the Fifth Wave, rigged with a carbon dioxide-bomb. She is dropped off near Cassie's group's hideout. Evan and Cassie manage to get the bomb out of her, for which they plan to use to attack the others, though Poundcake ends up detonating it to save the others from Grace. She inevitably lives on, independent and untrusting of any character in the books.

Flintstone "Flint" - a boy around Ben and Cassie's age. He is the former leader of Squad 53, until his drill sergeant, Reznik, replaced him with Zombie. In disbelief that Camp Haven could be a coup, he accidentally kills himself by taking the tracking devices and detonating his own kill-switch.

Tank - a young boy in Squad 53. He goes "Dorothy" (crazy) and is replaced by Ringer. Zombie and Dumbo discover him dead in the P&D Hangar (Processing and Disposal).

Kenny "Oompa" - an eight-or-nine-year-old boy on Squad 53. He is killed by grenade shrapnel on the squad's first patrol.

Razor - Alex is a recruit at the northern base where Ringer was captured. He orchestrates her and Teacup's escape from the military base though secrets codes traced on board. After jumping from a Blackhawk manned by Lieutenant Bobband surviving, he kisses Ringer. Razor later shoots Teacup so that Vosch will have no leverage over Ringer. He in turn is shot and killed himself by 5th Wave soldiers.

== Film adaptation ==
In March 2012, Columbia Pictures picked up the film rights to the trilogy, with Graham King and Tobey Maguire attached as producers. A film adaptation of the first novel in the series was released on January 22, 2016. It was directed by J Blakeson, with a screenplay by Susannah Grant, Akiva Goldsman, and Jeff Pinkner. While the film was a moderate box office success, it was negatively reviewed by critics and audiences, and there has been no word on any sequels.
