= The 5th Wave (film) =

2016 film by J Blakeson

- Theatrical release poster
- Directed by: J Blakeson
- Screenplay by: Susannah Grant; Akiva Goldsman; Jeff Pinkner
- Based on: The 5th Wave by Rick Yancey
- Produced by: Tobey Maguire; Graham King; Matthew Plouffe; Lynn Harris
- Starring: Chloë Grace Moretz; Nick Robinson; Ron Livingston; Maggie Siff; Alex Roe; Maria Bello; Maika Monroe; Liev Schreiber
- Cinematography: Enrique Chediak
- Edited by: Paul Rubell
- Music by: Henry Jackman
- Production companies: Columbia Pictures; LStar Capital; GK Films; Material Pictures; Living Films
- Distributed by: Sony Pictures Releasing
- Release date: January 22, 2016
- Running time: 112 minutes
- Country: United States
- Language: English
- Budget: $38–54 million
- Box office: $111.3 million

The 5th Wave is a 2016 American science fiction action film directed by J Blakeson from a screenplay by Susannah Grant, Akiva Goldsman and Jeff Pinkner, based on Rick Yancey's 2013 novel of the same name. The film stars Chloë Grace Moretz, Nick Robinson, Ron Livingston, Maggie Siff, Alex Roe, Maria Bello, Maika Monroe, and Liev Schreiber.

Development began in March 2012, when Columbia Pictures picked up the film rights to the trilogy of novels, with Graham King's production company GK Films and Tobey Maguire's Material Pictures. Filming took place in Atlanta, Georgia, from October 2014 to January 2015.

The 5th Wave was released in the United States on January 22, 2016, by Sony Pictures Releasing. Despite negative reviews from critics, the film was moderately successful, grossing $111 million worldwide against a $38–54 million budget.

== Plot ==
Ohio high schooler Cassie Sullivan, armed with an M4 carbine, emerges from the woods to raid an abandoned gas station. Upon entering, she hears a voice calling for help. She finds a wounded man who points a gun at her, and then each of them asks the other to put their weapon down. When he pulls his other hand out from under his jacket, she mistakes the metallic glint of a cross for that of a gun, so she kills him: the screen then cuts to black, and her backstory begins.

A colossal alien spaceship is circling Earth, guided by extraterrestrial life referred to as "the Others." Ten days later, The Others unleash their 'First Wave,' an EMP that disables all electrical power and communications worldwide and shuts off the engines of moving vehicles, including planes in mid-flight. The 'Second Wave' gives the Others power to manipulate the planet's geology and fault lines, causing earthquakes and megatsunamis that destroy coastal cities and islands, including Hallandale Beach (Located in Broward County, Florida), London, Bangkok and NYC. In Ohio, Lake Erie floods; Cassie and her younger brother Sam escape by climbing a tree. For the 'Third Wave,' the Others modify a strain of bird flu and spread it across the planet. The population is decimated, with Cassie's mother, Lisa, one of the victims. In the 'Fourth Wave,' the Others control humans and have them kill other humans.

Cassie, Sam, and their father, Oliver, find a summer camp in the woods that serves as a refuge for about 300 survivors. A few days later, a US Army unit with working vehicles rolls into the camp. The unit's commander, Colonel Alexander Vosch, claims there is an imminent threat of a 'Fifth Wave.' He states that the Army will take the children to safety at Wright-Patterson AFB, and will bring the buses back for the adults. Cassie is separated from Sam and witnesses the Army unit massacre all the adults, including Oliver. Cassie makes her way toward the base but is shot in the leg by a sniper and passes out.

A week or so later, she wakes up in the farmhouse of a young man named Evan Walker, who tells her that he saved her life. Cassie leaves with Evan for the base, but she learns that he is an Other, sent years ago as a sleeper agent. He merged his consciousness into a human host. The sleepers roam their designated zones, killing human survivors. Evan admits that his humanity was reactivated when he saw her, and that he is unwilling to cooperate with his training or the invasion; he lets her leave. He warns that Vosch and the military are possessed by the consciousness of individual Others.

At the base, the military has used deception and technology to convince the rescued children that all humans outside the base have been possessed. They provide military training to the children, forming them into squads to go on killing missions outside the base. Sam has been placed into a squad led by Ben Parish, a boy Cassie had a crush on, along with Ringer, a tough teenage girl, Dumbo, a teenage boy who survived the 'Second Wave,' and Teacup. While on their kill mission, Ringer removes her military implant, causing her to register as an Other-possessed human on the squad's scopes. The squad deduces that the plan is to have them kill any non-possessed humans: i.e., they are the 'Fifth Wave.' Ben sends his squad into the woods and returns to base, claiming his squad was killed, in order to retrieve Sam, who was left behind. Ben confronts Vosch about child warriors being the 'Fifth Wave.' Cassie kills Sergeant Reznik during her one-on-one indoctrination. Ben and Cassie find each other and leave to find Sam. Evan sets off numerous bombs and advises them to find Sam before the destruction of the entire facility. Vosch and the surviving military Others evacuate with the human children by military aircraft. Cassie, Ben, and Sam escape, with help from Ringer, just as Evan completes the base's destruction. Ben's squad is reunited, and Cassie ponders the strength of hope as humanity's driving force for survival.

== Cast ==
- Chloë Grace Moretz as Cassie Sullivan
- Nick Robinson as Ben Thomas Parish / Zombie
- Ron Livingston as Oliver Sullivan, Cassie's father
- Maggie Siff as Lisa Sullivan, Cassie's mother
- Alex Roe as Evan Walker
- Maria Bello as Sergeant Reznik
- Maika Monroe as Ringer
- Zackary Arthur as Sam Sullivan / Nugget, Cassie's younger brother
- Liev Schreiber as Colonel Alexander Vosch
- Tony Revolori as Dumbo
- Talitha Bateman as Teacup
- Nadji Jeter as Poundcake
- Alex MacNicoll as Flintstone
- Parker Wierling as Jeremy

== Production ==
=== Development ===
In March 2012, Columbia Pictures picked up the film rights to the trilogy, with Graham King and Tobey Maguire attached as producers. On April 15, 2014, it was officially announced that Chloë Grace Moretz would star as Cassie Sullivan, and that J Blakeson would direct from a script by Susannah Grant. From June through August 2014, Nick Robinson and Alex Roe joined the film as male protagonists Ben Parish and Evan Walker, respectively, while Liev Schreiber was cast as the villain. Over the following months, Maika Monroe, Zackary Arthur, Tony Revolori, Ron Livingston, Maggie Siff, and Talitha Bateman joined the film.

=== Filming ===
Principal photography began on October 18, 2014, in Atlanta, Georgia. According to production designer Jon Billington, the production team scouted a number of cities but Atlanta was ultimately selected for its "visual diversity and interest". A total of $21.7 million was spent shooting in Georgia. 967 local crew members were hired to help with the production of the film, and they spent 17,843 man-days working on the film. Billington designed the various sets used throughout the movie around Cassie and her story. He viewed the film as "Cassie's 'Odyssey'" and envisioned five "worlds" that she travels through linearly. A few scenes taking place in the forest were shot on the Jackson trail, outside of Winder, Georgia, US. Three months into production a planned bus explosion went awry when it spread wider than planned, blowing out more than forty windows in downtown Macon, Georgia, collapsing ceilings, destroying store fronts, setting one building on fire, and leaving soot on the brick buildings. The production company promised to cover all damages caused by the 3:45 am incident, but the work that was done was done badly and remained incomplete twenty-eight months later. Filming officially ended on January 17, 2015.

Livett's Launches provided filming support for the scene showing the destruction of Tower Bridge by a tsunami. In addition to London, Miami, Bangkok, Beijing, and New York can be seen during the Second Wave as they are destroyed by giant tsunami waves following the earthquake.

=== Music ===
In April 2015, it was announced that Henry Jackman would compose the original soundtrack for the film. Notable songs by popular artists featured in the film include Sia, Coldplay, Pitbull, Ne-Yo, Madeon, Passion Pit, and Mark Ronson. Part of the song Don't Panic by Coldplay can be heard when Ben and Sam sing it together in an attempt to lull Sam to sleep. Time of Our Lives by Pitbull ft. Ne-Yo, Pay No Mind by Madeon ft. Passion Pit, and Summer Breaking by Mark Ronson ft. Kevin Parker. can by heard during a house party flashback involving Cassie. Alive by Sia serves as the film's end credit song and was used in promotional material for the film.

==== Track listing ====
No.	Title	Length
1.	"Prologue"	1:59
2.	"Tsunami"	2:35
3.	"Aftermath"	2:40
4.	"Wright Patterson"	1:15
5.	"The Others"	1:55
6.	"One Degree of Separation"	1:46
7.	"Reznik"	2:32
8.	"Cassie"	2:03
9.	"In the Sights"	2:10
10.	"A Call to Arms"	2:12
11.	"Evan"	2:54
12.	"Dayton"	2:33
13.	"5th Wave"	1:30
14.	"Under Fire"	1:28
15.	"Flashback"	2:51
16.	"Extinction"	1:41
17.	"Finding Sam"	3:04
18.	"Getaway"	2:13
19.	"Epilogue"	3:07
20.	"Humanity"	3:57
21.	"Vosch"	6:09
22.	"Ringer"	0:44
Total length:		53:18

== Release ==
Sony Pictures Entertainment originally set the film a release date for January 29, 2016. On April 30, 2015, the release date was changed from its original release date of January 29, 2016, to an earlier date of January 15, 2016. However, in December 2015, the release date was pushed back from January 15, 2016, to January 22, 2016. It was released on January 14, 2016, in Australia, Germany, and the Middle East.

=== Marketing and promotion ===
An international trailer for the film was released on Sony Pictures' official YouTube account on September 1, 2015. Standard marketing techniques were used to promote the film such as movie posters, trailers, and TV advertising. The film also had several pages on social media including Facebook, Twitter, and Instagram. Lead actress Chloë Grace Moretz was featured on the cover of February 2016 issue of teenage lifestyle magazine Marie Claire to promote the film. The film's actors were also featured in several interviews with various YouTube channels such as IGN and FilmisNow

On May 3, 2016, it was announced via social media that the 5th Wave was available for purchase on Blu-Ray and Digital formats that same day. The film was released online on various video sites two weeks prior to this.

== Reception ==
=== Box office ===
The 5th Wave grossed $35 million in North America and $76 million in other territories for a worldwide total of $111 million, against a production budget of $54 million.

The film was released in North America on January 22, 2016, alongside Dirty Grandpa and The Boy, and was projected to gross $10–14 million from 2,908 theaters in its opening weekend. It made $475,000 from its Thursday night screenings and $3.5 million on its first day. It went on to gross $10.3 million in its opening weekend, finishing 6th at the box office.

=== Critical response ===
The review aggregation website Rotten Tomatoes reported that 17% of critics have given the film a positive review based on 143 reviews, with an average rating of 4.3/10. The site's critics consensus reads, "With unimpressive effects and plot points seemingly pieced together from previous dystopian young adult sci-fi films, The 5th Wave ends up feeling like more of a limp, derivative wriggle." On Metacritic, the film has a score of 33 out of 100 based on 30 critics, indicating "generally unfavorable reviews". Audiences polled by CinemaScore gave the film an average grade of "B−" on an A+ to F scale.

Jeffrey M. Anderson of The San Francisco Examiner said of the film, "Every plot turn and every line of dialogue has been borrowed from somewhere else, and everything is utterly, totally predictable", noting how the film "steals material from (but does not stop at) the Twilight, Hunger Games and Divergent franchises." Anthony Lane of The New Yorker faulted the film as a "marketing wheeze dressed up as an art form, and stupendously summarized by the image of Cassie hurrying through the woods carrying both an assault rifle and a Teddy bear", adding that the film "appears to have been designed by some crazed Oedipal wing of the N.R.A."

In the San Francisco Chronicle, Mick LaSalle wrote, "rarely does a movie that fails so utterly start so well", falling apart ahead of the fifth wave. As to a possible trilogy, "if we're not really vigilant, and look to the skies, and prepare, they're going to make at least two more of these things. We've got to beat back the invasion now". Eddie Cockrell of Variety gave the film a mixed review, saying, "The 5th Wave is an effectively decent post-apocalyptic, young adult, world-in-the-balance survival thriller" with an "arrestingly original spin on trendy genre tropes", although he suggested that fans of the book may have "issues with what has been edited".

Brian Truitt of USA Today gave the film a positive review, stating that it "is an inviting sci-fi invasion" and "nicely stokes the imagination of a new generation of science-fiction movie nerds". He praised Moretz and Robinson as "equally strong" co-leads. Shannon Harvey of The West Australian also gave the film a positive review, writing, "It's actually got a lot going for it, from acting prodigy Chloe Grace Moretz as the kind of tough but fragile heroine you can cheer for to handsome production values, several plot twists". Michael Patterson of Moviepilot gave the film a positive review, calling it a "thrilling story of survival".

Author of The 5th Wave Rick Yancy was heavily involved with the film's production from the beginning and seemed to be pleased with the final product saying "The filmmakers were very cognizant of the fact that what really sets the story apart is the heart of it". He believed that fans of the book would be "... pleased with how the filmmakers have captured the characters and story".

=== Accolades ===
Award	Category	Recipient	Result	Ref.
Teen Choice Awards	Choice Movie Actress: Sci-Fi/Fantasy	Chloë Grace Moretz	Nominated	

== See also ==
- List of films featuring extraterrestrials
- False flag
- "Men Against Fire", an episode of Black Mirror with a similar premise.
