= Empire Legend Award =

Former annual British film award

The Empire Legend Award (also known as the Legend of Our Lifetime Award) is an honorary Empire Award presented by the British film magazine Empire. The Empire Legend Award was first introduced at the 17th Empire Awards in 2012 with Tim Burton receiving the award. Ralph Fiennes is the most recent winner in this category. At the most recent awards ceremony three honorary awards were presented: Empire Hero Award, Empire Inspiration Award and Empire Legend Award.

== Winners ==
In the list below, winners are listed first in boldface. The number of the ceremony (1st, 2nd, etc.) appears in parentheses after the awards year, linked to the article (if any) on that ceremony.

=== 2010s ===
Tom Cruise And Steven Spielberg Awarded Legend of our Lifetime Award

Year	Winner	Ref.
**2012** **(17th)**	Tim Burton	
**2013** **(18th)**	Helen Mirren	
**2014** **(19th)**	Tom Cruise	
**2015** **(20th)**	Ralph Fiennes	
**2016** **(21st)**	Alan Rickman	
**2017** **(22nd)**	Patrick Stewart	
**2018** **(23rd)**	Steven Spielberg	
