= 17th Empire Awards =

2012 British film awards ceremony

- The logo for the 17th Empire Awards
- Date: 25 March 2012
- Site: Grosvenor House Hotel, London, England
- Hosted by: Lauren Laverne; Chris Hewitt

Highlights
- Best Film: Harry Potter and the Deathly Hallows – Part 2
- Best British Film: Tinker Tailor Soldier Spy
- Most awards: Tinker Tailor Soldier Spy (3)
- Most nominations: Drive, Harry Potter and the Deathly Hallows – Part 2 and Tinker Tailor Soldier Spy (5)

The 17th Empire Awards ceremony (officially known as the Jameson Empire Awards), presented by the British film magazine Empire, honoured the best films of 2011 and took place on 25 March 2012 at the Grosvenor House Hotel in London, England. During the ceremony, the Empire presented Empire Awards in 13 categories as well as three honorary awards. The awards for The Art of 3D, the new Best Male Newcomer and Best Female Newcomer (replacing the Best Newcomer award) and the honorary Empire Legend Award were first introduced this year. English Radio DJ Lauren Laverne and Empire magazine's news editor Chris Hewitt co-hosted the show, marking the first time for each and the first time the show was co-hosted. The awards were sponsored by Jameson Irish Whiskey for the fourth consecutive year.

In related events, Empire and Jameson Irish Whiskey held the 3rd Done In 60 Seconds Competition Global Final on March 23, 2012 at the London Film Museum, London, England. The team of judges consisted of Empire editor-in-chief Mark Dinning, Sky Movies Premiere English presenter Alex Zane, Irish actor and comedian Chris O'Dowd and English director Gareth Edwards, which selected from a shortlist of 28 nominees the five Done In 60 Seconds Award finalists that were invited to the Empire Awards where the winner was announced.

Tinker Tailor Soldier Spy won the most awards with three, including Best British Film. Other winners included Harry Potter and the Deathly Hallows – Part 2 and Thor with two awards and Kill List, Like Crazy, The Adventures of Tintin: The Secret of the Unicorn, The Inbetweeners Movie, and Tyrannosaur with one. Michael Fassbender received the Empire Hero Award, Ron Howard received the Empire Inspiration Award and Tim Burton received the Empire Legend Award. Indira Suleimenova from Kazakhstan won the Done In 60 Seconds Award for her 60-second film version of Black Swan.

== Winners and nominees ==
Winners are listed first and highlighted in boldface.

**Best Film**: **Harry Potter and the Deathly Hallows – Part 2**; Drive; Rise of the Planet of the Apes; The Girl with the Dragon Tattoo; Tinker Tailor Soldier Spy	**Best British Film**: **Tinker Tailor Soldier Spy**; Attack the Block; Submarine; The Inbetweeners Movie; Tyrannosaur
**Best Director**: **David Yates — Harry Potter and the Deathly Hallows – Part 2**; Nicolas Winding Refn — Drive; Rupert Wyatt — Rise of the Planet of the Apes; Steven Spielberg — War Horse; Tomas Alfredson — Tinker Tailor Soldier Spy	
**Best Actor**: **Gary Oldman — Tinker Tailor Soldier Spy**; Andy Serkis — Rise of the Planet of the Apes; Daniel Craig — The Girl with the Dragon Tattoo; Daniel Radcliffe — Harry Potter and the Deathly Hallows – Part 2; Ryan Gosling — Drive	**Best Actress**: **Olivia Colman — Tyrannosaur**; Carey Mulligan — Drive; Meryl Streep — The Iron Lady; Michelle Williams — My Week with Marilyn; Rooney Mara — The Girl with the Dragon Tattoo
**Best Male Newcomer**: **Tom Hiddleston — Thor**; Asa Butterfield — Hugo; Craig Roberts — Submarine; Jeremy Irvine — War Horse; John Boyega — Attack the Block; Sam Claflin — Pirates of the Caribbean: On Stranger Tides	**Best Female Newcomer**: **Felicity Jones — Like Crazy**; Bonnie Wright — Harry Potter and the Deathly Hallows – Part 2; Céline Buckens — War Horse; Elle Fanning — Super 8; Hailee Steinfeld — True Grit; Laura Haddock — The Inbetweeners Movie
**Best Comedy**: **The Inbetweeners Movie**; Attack the Block; Bridesmaids; Crazy, Stupid, Love; Midnight in Paris	**Best Horror**: **Kill List**; Attack the Block; Insidious; Paranormal Activity 3; Trollhunter
**Best Sci-Fi/Fantasy**: **Thor**; Captain America: The First Avenger; Rise of the Planet of the Apes; Super 8; X-Men: First Class	**Best Thriller**: **Tinker Tailor Soldier Spy**; Drive; Hanna; Sherlock Holmes: A Game of Shadows; The Girl with the Dragon Tattoo
**The Art of 3D**: **The Adventures of Tintin: The Secret of the Unicorn**; Harry Potter and the Deathly Hallows – Part 2; Hugo; Thor; Transformers: Dark of the Moon	**Done In 60 Seconds Award**: **Kazakhstan: Black Swan by Indira Suleimenova** (Note: Done In 60 Seconds: Black Swan by Indira Suleimenova on YouTube); Finalists: Bulgaria: Edward Scissorhands by Rosen Lliev (Note: Done In 60 Seconds: Edward Scissorhands by Rosen Lliev on YouTube); Chile: Spider-Man by Gonzalo Ruiz & Joaquin Vergara (Note: Done In 60 Seconds: Spider-Man by Gonzalo Ruiz & Joaquin Vergara on YouTube); Ireland: District 9 by Andrew Norton (Note: Done In 60 Seconds: District 9 by Andrew Norton on YouTube); United Kingdom: Hergé's Raiders of the Lost Ark (The Adventures of Tintin and Raiders of the Lost Ark) by Philip Askins (Note: Done In 60 Seconds: Herge's Raiders of the Lost Ark by Philip Askins on YouTube); The other shortlisted films: Belgium: Titanic by Marie Hologne (Note: Done In 60 Seconds: Titanic by Marie Hologne on YouTube); Belgium: The Jetty by Alexis Berthelot & Anouchka (Note: Done In 60 Seconds: The Jetty by Alexis Berthelot & Anouchka on YouTube); Czech Republic: Forrest Gump by Unknown Director (Note: Done In 60 Seconds: Forrest Gump by Unknown Director on YouTube); Germany: Buried by Ferenc Horváth (Note: Done In 60 Seconds: Buried by Ferenc Horváth on YouTube); India: Eternal Sunshine of the Spotless Mind by Arati Kadav (Note: Done In 60 Seconds: Eternal Sunshine of the Spotless Mind by Arati Kadav on YouTube); India: Fight Club by Mayank Shethiya (Note: Done In 60 Seconds: Fight Club by Mayank Shethiya on YouTube); Israel: Limitless by Boris Shurp (Note: Done In 60 Seconds: Limitless by Boris Shurp on YouTube); Latvia: Fantastic Mr Fox by Jānis Ābele (Note: Done In 60 Seconds: Fantastic Mr Fox by Jānis Ābele on YouTube); Netherlands: Drive by Stephane Kaas (Note: Done In 60 Seconds: Drive by Stephane Kaas on YouTube); Portugal: The King's Speech by Nuno Gervásio (Note: Done In 60 Seconds: The King's Speech by Nuno Gervásio on YouTube); Romania: The Birds by Vlad Andrei Ghinea (Note: Done In 60 Seconds: The Birds by Vlad Andrei Ghinea on YouTube); Russia: Commando by Роман Бубнов (Note: Done In 60 Seconds: Commando by Роман Бубнов on YouTube); Russia: In Time by Ilya Subbotin (Note: Done In 60 Seconds: In Time by Ilya Subbotin on YouTube); Russia: Pirates of the Caribbean by Andrey Kilin (Note: Done In 60 Seconds: Pirates of the Caribbean by Andrey Kilin on YouTube); Russia: TransfomeRUS (Transformers) by Potapov Sergey (Note: Done In 60 Seconds: TransfomeRUS by Potapov Sergey on YouTube); Russia: The Godfather by Yaroslav Denisov (Note: Done In 60 Seconds: The Godfather by Yaroslav Denisov on YouTube); Serbia: Psycho by Marko Kovac̈ (Note: Done In 60 Seconds: Psycho by Marko Kovac on YouTube); Sweden: Free Willy by Stefan Lundaahl, Samuel Heiligers & Frej Bengtsson (Note: Done In 60 Seconds: Free Willy by Stefan Lundaahl, Samuel Heiligers & Frej Bengtsson on YouTube); Ukraine: Se7en by Nataliya Shevchenko (Note: Done In 60 Seconds: Se7en by Nataliya Shevchenko on YouTube); United Kingdom: The Thing (Prequel) by Simon Jago (Note: Done In 60 Seconds: The Thing (Prequel) by Simon Jago on YouTube); United Kingdom: War Horse by David Smith (Note: Done In 60 Seconds: War Horse by David Smith on YouTube); United Kingdom: The King's Speech by Jack Kendall (Note: Done In 60 Seconds: The King's Speech by Jack Kendall on YouTube); United Kingdom: The Star Wars Prequel Trilogy by Michael Whaite (Note: Done In 60 Seconds: The Star Wars Prequel Trilogy by Michael Whaite on YouTube); Unknown: The Birds by Nikolaus Suchentrunk (Note: Done In 60 Seconds: The Birds by Nikolaus Suchentrunk on YouTube)
**Honorary Awards**: Empire Hero Award: **Michael Fassbender**; Empire Inspiration Award: **Ron Howard**; Empire Legend Award: **Tim Burton**

=== Multiple awards ===
The following three films received multiple awards:

Awards	Film
3	Tinker Tailor Soldier Spy
2	Harry Potter and the Deathly Hallows – Part 2
2	Thor

=== Multiple nominations ===
The following 13 films received multiple nominations:

Nominations	Film
5	Drive
5	Harry Potter and the Deathly Hallows – Part 2
5	Tinker Tailor Soldier Spy
4	Attack the Block
4	Rise of the Planet of the Apes
4	The Girl with the Dragon Tattoo
3	The Inbetweeners Movie
3	Thor
3	War Horse
2	Hugo
2	Submarine
2	Super 8
2	Tyrannosaur
