= 13th Empire Awards =

2008 British film awards ceremony

- The logo for the 13th Empire Awards
- Date: 9 March 2008
- Site: Grosvenor House Hotel, London, England
- Hosted by: Rob Brydon

Highlights
- Best Film: The Bourne Ultimatum
- Best British Film: Atonement
- Most awards: Atonement (3)
- Most nominations: Atonement and Harry Potter and the Order of the Phoenix (6)

Television coverage
- Channel: ITV2

The 13th Empire Awards ceremony (officially known as the Sony Ericsson Empire Awards), presented by the British film magazine Empire, honored the best films of 2007 and took place on 9 March 2008 at the Grosvenor House Hotel in London, England. During the ceremony, Empire presented Empire Awards in 12 categories as well as three honorary awards. The awards for the Sony Ericsson Soundtrack and the Done In 60 Seconds competition were first introduced this year. The Best Newcomer returned to a single award, having last year been split into "Best Male Newcomer" and "Best Female Newcomer" awards and the honorary Outstanding Contribution to British Cinema was renamed to Outstanding Contribution to British Film. The ceremony was televised in the United Kingdom by ITV2 on March 10. Welsh actor Rob Brydon hosted the show for the first time. The awards were sponsored by Sony Ericsson for the fifth year, having last sponsored the 11th ceremony held in 2006.

Atonement won the most awards with three including Best British Film. Other winners included Control with two awards and 28 Weeks Later, American Gangster, Harry Potter and the Order of the Phoenix, Hot Fuzz, Stardust and The Bourne Ultimatum with one. Ewan McGregor received the Empire Icon Award, Guillermo del Toro received the Empire Inspiration Award, and Shane Meadows received the Outstanding Contribution to British Film award. Nick Jesper from the United Kingdom won the Done In 60 Seconds Award for his 60-second film version of Titanic.

== Winners and nominees ==
Winners are listed first and highlighted in boldface.

| **Best Film**: **The Bourne Ultimatum**; Harry Potter and the Order of the Phoenix; Ratatouille; The Assassination of Jesse James by the Coward Robert Ford; Zodiac | **Best British Film**: **Atonement**; Control; Hot Fuzz; Sunshine; This Is England |
| **Best Director**: **David Yates — Harry Potter and the Order of the Phoenix**; David Fincher — Zodiac; Edgar Wright — Hot Fuzz; Joe Wright — Atonement; Paul Greengrass — The Bourne Ultimatum | |
| **Best Actor**: **James McAvoy — Atonement**; Daniel Radcliffe — Harry Potter and the Order of the Phoenix; Gerard Butler — 300; Matt Damon — The Bourne Ultimatum; Simon Pegg — Hot Fuzz | **Best Actress**: **Keira Knightley — Atonement**; Angelina Jolie — A Mighty Heart; Cate Blanchett — Elizabeth: The Golden Age; Emma Watson — Harry Potter and the Order of the Phoenix; Katherine Heigl — Knocked Up |
| **Best Comedy**: **Hot Fuzz**; Knocked Up; Ratatouille; Run Fatboy Run; Superbad | **Best Horror**: **28 Weeks Later**; 30 Days of Night; 1408; Death Proof; Saw IV |
| **Best Sci-Fi/Fantasy**: **Stardust**; 300; Harry Potter and the Order of the Phoenix; Sunshine; Transformers | **Best Thriller**: **American Gangster**; Disturbia; Eastern Promises; The Bourne Ultimatum; Zodiac |
| **Best Newcomer**: **Sam Riley — Control**; Gemma Arterton — St Trinian's; Saoirse Ronan — Atonement; Shia LaBeouf — Transformers; Thomas Turgoose — This Is England | **Sony Ericsson Soundtrack Award**: **Control**; Atonement; Hairspray; Harry Potter and the Order of the Phoenix; Once |
| **Done In 60 Seconds Award**: **United Kingdom: Titanic by Nick Jesper** (Note: Done In 60 Seconds: Titanic by Nick Jesper on YouTube); Finalists: United Kingdom: Alien by George Pursall and Thomas Stock (Note: Done In 60 Seconds: Alien by George Pursall and Thomas Stock on YouTube); United Kingdom: Atonement by Ellie Rogers (Note: Done In 60 Seconds: Atonement by Ellie Rogers on YouTube); United Kingdom: Close Encounters of the Third Kind by Phil Heeks (Note: Done In 60 Seconds: Close Encounters of the Third Kind by Phil Heeks on YouTube); United Kingdom: Speed by Mark Wong (Note: Done In 60 Seconds: Speed by Mark Wong on YouTube); The other shortlisted films: United Kingdom: Back to the Future by Lynsey Yarnell; United Kingdom: Dino-Empire (Jurassic Park) by Ryhs Owain; United Kingdom: Evil Dead II by Tim Chivers (Note: Done In 60 Seconds: Evil Dead II by Tim Chivers on YouTube); United Kingdom: Harry Potter by Oliver Hollingdale; United Kingdom: Nosferatu by Liam Johnston; United Kingdom: Rambo: First Blood by Tom Marshall (Note: Done In 60 Seconds: Rambo: First Blood by Tom Marshall on YouTube); United Kingdom: Saving Private Ryan by Alison Goldsmith (Note: Done In 60 Seconds: Saving Private Ryan by Alison Goldsmith on YouTube); United Kingdom: The Seventh Seal by Dan Horn (Note: Done In 60 Seconds: The Seventh Seal by Dan Horn on YouTube); United Kingdom: The Dam Busters by Matt Bigwood (Note: Done In 60 Seconds: The Dam Busters by Matt Bigwood on YouTube); United Kingdom: The Shining by Henry S & Matt D (Note: Done In 60 Seconds: The Shining by Henry S & Matt D on YouTube) | **Honorary Awards**: Empire Icon Award: **Ewan McGregor**; Empire Inspiration Award: **Guillermo del Toro**; Outstanding Contribution to British Film: **Shane Meadows** |

=== Multiple awards ===
The following two films received multiple awards:

| Awards | Film |
|---|---|
| 3 | Atonement |
| 2 | Control |

=== Multiple nominations ===
The following 12 films received multiple nominations:

| Nominations | Film |
|---|---|
| 6 | Atonement |
| 6 | Harry Potter and the Order of the Phoenix |
| 4 | Hot Fuzz |
| 4 | The Bourne Ultimatum |
| 3 | Control |
| 3 | Zodiac |
| 2 | 300 |
| 2 | Knocked Up |
| 2 | Ratatouille |
| 2 | Sunshine |
| 2 | This Is England |
| 2 | Transformers |
