= 6th Empire Awards =

2001 British film awards ceremony

- Date: 19 February 2001
- Site: The Dorchester Hotel, London, England
- Hosted by: Dermot O'Leary
- Empire issue: #143 (May 2001)

Highlights
- Best Film: Gladiator
- Best British Film: Billy Elliot
- Most awards: Billy Elliot and Gladiator (3)
- Most nominations: American Beauty, Billy Elliot and Gladiator (4)

Television coverage
- Channel: Film4 and Channel 4

The 6th Empire Awards ceremony, presented by the British film magazine Empire, honored the best films of 2000 and took place on 19 February 2001. During the ceremony, Empire presented Empire Awards in nine categories as well as two honorary awards. The award for Best British Director was presented for the last time until the 10th Empire Awards where it was presented again for the last time. The ceremony was televised in the United Kingdom by Film4 on 21 February and Channel 4 on 25 February. British television presenter and radio presenter Dermot O'Leary hosted the show for the first time. The awards were sponsored by Genie for the first time.

Billy Elliot and Gladiator were tied for most awards won with three awards apiece. Billy Elliot won the award for Best British Film, while Gladiator won the award for Best Film. Other winners included Snatch with two awards and X-Men with one. Aardman Animations received the Empire Inspiration Award and Richard Harris received the Lifetime Achievement Award.

== Winners and nominees ==
Winners are listed first and highlighted in boldface.

**Best Film**: **Gladiator**; American Beauty; Crouching Tiger, Hidden Dragon; High Fidelity; Magnolia	**Best British Film**: **Billy Elliot**; Angela's Ashes; Chicken Run; Snatch; Topsy-Turvy
**Best Director**: **Bryan Singer — X-Men**; Ang Lee — Crouching Tiger, Hidden Dragon; Christopher Nolan — Memento; Michael Mann — The Insider; Paul Thomas Anderson — Magnolia	**Best British Director**: **Guy Ritchie — Snatch**; Nick Park and Peter Lord — Chicken Run; Ridley Scott — Gladiator; Sam Mendes — American Beauty; Stephen Daldry — Billy Elliot
**Best Actor**: **Russell Crowe — Gladiator**; George Clooney — O Brother, Where Art Thou?; Jim Carrey — Dr. Seuss' How the Grinch Stole Christmas; John Cusack — High Fidelity; Kevin Spacey — American Beauty	**Best British Actor**: **Vinnie Jones — Snatch**; Christian Bale — American Psycho; Jude Law — The Talented Mr. Ripley; Michael Caine — The Cider House Rules; Robert Carlyle — Angela's Ashes
**Best Actress**: **Connie Nielsen — Gladiator**; Angelina Jolie — Girl, Interrupted; Hilary Swank — Boys Don't Cry; Julia Roberts — Erin Brockovich; Kate Winslet — Quills	**Best British Actress**: **Julie Walters — Billy Elliot**; Brenda Blethyn — Saving Grace; Kathy Burke — Kevin & Perry Go Large; Samantha Morton — Sweet and Lowdown; Thandie Newton — Mission: Impossible 2
**Best Debut**: **Jamie Bell — Billy Elliot**; Nick Park and Peter Lord — Chicken Run; Sam Mendes — American Beauty; Sofia Coppola — The Virgin Suicides; Spike Jonze — Being John Malkovich	**Honorary Awards**: Empire Inspiration Award: **Aardman Animations**; Lifetime Achievement Award: **Richard Harris**

=== Multiple awards ===
The following three films received multiple awards:

Awards	Film
3	Billy Elliot
3	Gladiator
2	Snatch

=== Multiple nominations ===
The following nine films received multiple nominations:

Nominations	Film
4	American Beauty
4	Billy Elliot
4	Gladiator
3	Chicken Run
3	Snatch
2	Angela's Ashes
2	Crouching Tiger, Hidden Dragon
2	High Fidelity
2	Magnolia
