= Empire Inspiration Award =

Former annual British film award

The Empire Inspiration Award is an honorary Empire Award presented by the British film magazine Empire. The Empire Inspiration Award was first introduced at the 2nd Empire Awards ceremony in 1997 with the Monty Python team receiving the award. The award was absent from the 3rd, 8th, 12th and 14th Empire Awards ceremonies. Luc Besson is the most recent winner in this category. At the most recent awards ceremony three honorary awards were presented: Empire Hero Award, Empire Inspiration Award and Empire Legend Award.

== Winners ==
In the list below, winners are listed first in boldface. The number of the ceremony (1st, 2nd, etc.) appears in parentheses after the awards year, linked to the article (if any) on that ceremony.

=== 1990s ===
Year	Winner	Ref.
**1997** **(2nd)**	**The Monty Python team**	
**1999** **(4th)**	**Spike Lee**	

=== 2000s ===
Year	Winner	Ref.
**2000** **(5th)**	Kenneth Branagh	
**2001** **(6th)**	Aardman Animations	
**2002** **(7th)**	Michael Mann	
**2004** **(9th)**	Ray Harryhausen	
**2005** **(10th)**	Pixar	
**2006** **(11th)**	Stephen Frears	
**2008** **(13th)**	Guillermo del Toro	

=== 2010s ===
Year	Winner	Ref.
**2010** **(15th)**	Andy Serkis	
**2011** **(16th)**	Edgar Wright	
**2012** **(17th)**	Ron Howard	
**2013** **(18th)**	Sam Mendes	
**2014** **(19th)**	Paul Greengrass	
**2015** **(20th)**	Christopher Nolan	
**2016** **(21st)**	Paddy Considine	
**2017** **(22nd)**	Luc Besson	
