= 22nd Empire Awards =

2017 British film awards ceremony

- Date: 19 March 2017
- Site: London, England

Highlights
- Best Film: Rogue One: A Star Wars Story
- Best British Film: I, Daniel Blake
- Most awards: Fantastic Beasts and Where to Find Them (4)
- Most nominations: Rogue One: A Star Wars Story (9)

The 22nd Empire Awards ceremony (officially known as the Jameson Empire Awards), presented by the British film magazine Empire, honored the best films of 2016. The ceremony took place on 19 March 2017 in London, England.

== Winners and nominees ==
Winners are listed first and highlighted in boldface.

**Best Film**: **Rogue One: A Star Wars Story**; La La Land; Arrival; Deadpool; Hunt for the Wilderpeople	**Best British Film**: **I, Daniel Blake**; Eddie the Eagle; Fantastic Beasts and Where to Find Them; High-Rise; The Girl with All the Gifts
**Best Director**: **Gareth Edwards** — **Rogue One: A Star Wars Story**; Taika Waititi — Hunt for the Wilderpeople; Ken Loach — I, Daniel Blake; Denis Villeneuve — Arrival; Andrea Arnold — American Honey	**Best Screenplay**: **Deadpool — Rhett Reese and Paul Wernick**; Arrival — Eric Heisserer; Hell or High Water — Taylor Sheridan; Hunt for the Wilderpeople — Taika Waititi; The Nice Guys — Shane Black and Anthony Bagarozzi
**Best Actor**: **Eddie Redmayne** — **Fantastic Beasts and Where to Find Them**; Ryan Gosling — La La Land; Casey Affleck — Manchester by the Sea; Ryan Reynolds — Deadpool; Benedict Cumberbatch — Doctor Strange	**Best Actress**: **Felicity Jones** — **Rogue One: A Star Wars Story**; Emma Stone — La La Land; Ruth Negga — Loving; Natalie Portman — Jackie; Amy Adams — Arrival
**Best Male Newcomer**: **Dave Johns** — **I, Daniel Blake**; Tom Holland — Captain America: Civil War; Riz Ahmed — Rogue One: A Star Wars Story; Julian Dennison — Hunt for the Wilderpeople; Lewis MacDougall — A Monster Calls	**Best Female Newcomer**: **Anya Taylor-Joy** — **The Witch**; Sasha Lane — American Honey; Angourie Rice — The Nice Guys; Sennia Nanua — The Girl with All the Gifts; Hayley Squires — I, Daniel Blake
**Best Comedy**: **The Greasy Strangler**; Hunt for the Wilderpeople; Deadpool; The Nice Guys; Ghostbusters	**Best Horror**: **The Witch**; Don't Breathe; Under the Shadow; The Conjuring 2; Green Room
**Best Sci-Fi/Fantasy**: **A Monster Calls**; Arrival; Doctor Strange; Rogue One: A Star Wars Story; 10 Cloverfield Lane	**Best Thriller**: **Jason Bourne**; Hell or High Water; Captain America: Civil War; Nocturnal Animals; Victoria
**Best Animated Film**: **Finding Dory**; Moana; Anomalisa; Your Name; Kubo and the Two Strings	**Best Documentary**: **Oasis: Supersonic**; My Scientology Movie; Weiner; The Beatles: Eight Days a Week; 13th
**Best Short Film**: **Inner Workings**; Borrowed Time; Piper; Thunder Road; Town vs Gown	**Best Soundtrack**: **La La Land**; Arrival; The Greasy Strangler; Moana; Sing Street
**Best Production Design**: **Fantastic Beasts and Where to Find Them**; La La Land; Arrival; Rogue One: A Star Wars Story; Doctor Strange	**Best Costume Design**: **Fantastic Beasts and Where to Find Them**; Captain America: Civil War; Rogue One: A Star Wars Story; Doctor Strange; Deadpool
**Best Makeup and Hair Styling**: **Fantastic Beasts and Where to Find Them**; Rogue One: A Star Wars Story; Suicide Squad; Star Trek Beyond; The Neon Demon	**Best Visual Effects**: **Doctor Strange**; Captain America: Civil War; Rogue One: A Star Wars Story; The Jungle Book; Fantastic Beasts and Where to Find Them
**Best TV Series**: **The Night Manager**; Game of Thrones; Stranger Things; Sherlock; Westworld	**Best Video Game**: **Uncharted 4: A Thief's End**; Battlefield 1; FIFA 17; The Last Guardian; Overwatch
**Honorary Awards**: Empire Hero Award: **Tom Hiddleston**; Empire Inspiration Award: **Luc Besson**; Empire Legend Award: **Sir Patrick Stewart**

=== Multiple awards ===
The following films received multiple awards:

Awards	Film
4	Fantastic Beasts and Where to Find Them
3	Rogue One: A Star Wars Story
2	I, Daniel Blake
2	The Witch

=== Multiple nominations ===
The following films received multiple nominations:

Awards	Film
9	Rogue One: A Star Wars Story
7	Arrival
6	Fantastic Beasts and Where to Find Them
5	Deadpool
5	Doctor Strange
5	Hunt for the Wilderpeople
5	La La Land
4	Captain America: Civil War
4	I, Daniel Blake
3	The Nice Guys
2	American Honey
2	The Girl with All the Gifts
2	The Greasy Strangler
2	Hell or High Water
2	Moana
2	A Monster Calls
2	The Witch
