= Empire Award for The Art of 3D =

Former annual British film award

- Awarded for: Best 3D film
- Country: United Kingdom
- Presented by: Empire magazine
- First award: 2012
- Final award: 2013
- Currently held by: Dredd (2013)

The Empire Award for The Art of 3D was an Empire Award presented annually by the British film magazine Empire to honor the best 3D film of the previous year. The Empire Award for The Art of 3D was first introduced at the 17th Empire Awards ceremony in 2012 with The Adventures of Tintin: The Secret of the Unicorn receiving the award and last presented at the 18th Empire Awards ceremony in 2013 with Dredd receiving the award. Winners were voted by the readers of Empire magazine.

== Winners and nominees ==
In the list below, winners are listed first in boldface, followed by the other nominees. The number of the ceremony (1st, 2nd, etc.) appears in parentheses after the awards year, linked to the article (if any) on that ceremony.

=== 2010s ===
Year	Film	Ref.
**2012** **(17th)**	**The Adventures of Tintin: The Secret of the Unicorn**	
**2012** **(17th)**	Harry Potter and the Deathly Hallows – Part 2	
**2012** **(17th)**	Hugo	
**2012** **(17th)**	Thor	
**2012** **(17th)**	Transformers: Dark of the Moon	
**2013** **(18th)**	**Dredd**	
**2013** **(18th)**	Life of Pi	
**2013** **(18th)**	Prometheus	
**2013** **(18th)**	The Avengers	
**2013** **(18th)**	The Hobbit: An Unexpected Journey	
