= Empire Award for Best Thriller =

Annual award by Empire magazine

- Awarded for: Best thriller film of the year
- Country: United Kingdom
- Presented by: Empire magazine
- First award: 2006
- Currently held by: Kingsman: The Golden Circle (2018)

The Empire Award for Best Thriller is an Empire Award presented annually by the British film magazine Empire to honor the best thriller film of the previous year. The Empire Award for Best Thriller is one of four new Best Film ongoing awards which were first introduced at the 11th Empire Awards ceremony in 2006 (along with Best Comedy, Best Horror and Best Sci-Fi/Fantasy) with Kiss Kiss Bang Bang receiving the award. Winners are voted by the readers of Empire magazine.

== Winners and nominees ==
In the list below, winners are listed first in boldface, followed by the other nominees. The number of the ceremony (1st, 2nd, etc.) appears in parentheses after the awards year, linked to the article (if any) on that ceremony.

=== 2000s ===
Year	Film	Ref.
**2006** **(11th)**	**Kiss Kiss Bang Bang**	
**2006** **(11th)**	A History of Violence	
**2006** **(11th)**	Batman Begins	
**2006** **(11th)**	Sin City	
**2006** **(11th)**	The Constant Gardener	
**2007** **(12th)**	**The Departed**	
**2007** **(12th)**	Caché	
**2007** **(12th)**	Inside Man	
**2007** **(12th)**	Mission: Impossible III	
**2007** **(12th)**	Munich	
**2008** **(13th)**	**American Gangster**	
**2008** **(13th)**	Disturbia	
**2008** **(13th)**	Eastern Promises	
**2008** **(13th)**	The Bourne Ultimatum	
**2008** **(13th)**	Zodiac	
**2009** **(14th)**	**Quantum of Solace**	
**2009** **(14th)**	Changeling	
**2009** **(14th)**	Eagle Eye	
**2009** **(14th)**	Gone Baby Gone	
**2009** **(14th)**	No Country for Old Men	

=== 2010s ===
Year	Film	Ref.
**2010** **(15th)**	**Sherlock Holmes**	
**2010** **(15th)**	Harry Brown	
**2010** **(15th)**	Inglourious Basterds	
**2010** **(15th)**	Public Enemies	
**2010** **(15th)**	The Hurt Locker	
**2011** **(16th)**	**The Girl with the Dragon Tattoo**	
**2011** **(16th)**	127 Hours	
**2011** **(16th)**	Black Swan	
**2011** **(16th)**	Shutter Island	
**2011** **(16th)**	The Town	
**2012** **(17th)**	**Tinker Tailor Soldier Spy**	
**2012** **(17th)**	Drive	
**2012** **(17th)**	Hanna	
**2012** **(17th)**	Sherlock Holmes: A Game of Shadows	
**2012** **(17th)**	The Girl with the Dragon Tattoo	
**2013** **(18th)**	**Headhunters**	
**2013** **(18th)**	Argo	
**2013** **(18th)**	Skyfall	
**2013** **(18th)**	The Raid	
**2013** **(18th)**	Zero Dark Thirty	
**2014** **(19th)**	**The Hunger Games: Catching Fire**	
**2014** **(19th)**	Captain Phillips	
**2014** **(19th)**	Now You See Me	
**2014** **(19th)**	Prisoners	
**2014** **(19th)**	Trance	
**2015** **(20th)**	**The Imitation Game**	
**2015** **(20th)**	Captain America: The Winter Soldier	
**2015** **(20th)**	Gone Girl	
**2015** **(20th)**	Kingsman: The Secret Service	
**2015** **(20th)**	Locke	
**2016** **(21st)**	**Spectre**	
**2016** **(21st)**	Bridge of Spies	
**2016** **(21st)**	The Gift	
**2016** **(21st)**	Mission: Impossible – Rogue Nation	
**2016** **(21st)**	Sicario	
**2017** **(22nd)**	**Jason Bourne**	
**2017** **(22nd)**	Victoria	
**2017** **(22nd)**	Nocturnal Animals	
**2017** **(22nd)**	Hell or High Water	
**2017** **(22nd)**	Captain America: Civil War	
**2018** **(23rd)**	**Kingsman: The Golden Circle**	
**2018** **(23rd)**	John Wick: Chapter 2	
**2018** **(23rd)**	Baby Driver	
**2018** **(23rd)**	The Handmaiden	
**2018** **(23rd)**	Three Billboards Outside Ebbing, Missouri	
