= 18th Empire Awards =

2013 British film awards ceremony

- The logo for the 18th Empire Awards
- Date: 24 March 2013
- Site: Grosvenor House Hotel, London, England
- Hosted by: Ed Byrne

Highlights
- Best Film: Skyfall
- Best British Film: Sightseers
- Most awards: Skyfall and The Hobbit: An Unexpected Journey (2)
- Most nominations: Skyfall (6)

Television coverage
- Channel: Sky Movies

The 18th Empire Awards ceremony (officially known as the Jameson Empire Awards), presented by the British film magazine Empire, honored the best films of 2012 and took place on 24 March 2013 at the Grosvenor House Hotel in London, England. During the ceremony, Empire presented Empire Awards in 13 categories as well as four honorary awards. The honorary Outstanding Contribution to British Film Award was renamed Outstanding Contribution. The Art of 3D Award as well as the honorary Empire Legend Award and Outstanding Contribution Award were presented for the last time. The ceremony was televised in the United Kingdom by Sky Movies on March 30. Irish comedian Ed Byrne hosted the show for the first time. The awards were sponsored by Jameson Irish Whiskey for the fifth consecutive year.

In related events, Empire and Jameson Irish Whiskey held the 4th Done In 60 Seconds Competition Global Final on 22 March 2013 at the Google Campus, London, England. The team of judges consisted of Empire editor-in-chief Mark Dinning, Bauer Media CEO Paul Keenan, Sky Movies Premiere, English presenter Alex Zane, Scottish radio DJ Edith Bowman and English actors Joanne Froggatt and Tom Hiddleston, which selected from a shortlist of 23 nominees the five Done In 60 Seconds Award finalists that were invited to the Empire Awards where the winner was announced.

Skyfall won two awards including Best Film and Best Director for Sam Mendes. Other winners included The Hobbit: An Unexpected Journey also with two awards and Dredd, Headhunters, Les Misérables, Sightseers, Ted, The Hunger Games, The Impossible and The Woman in Black with one. Daniel Radcliffe received the Empire Hero Award, Sam Mendes received the Empire Inspiration Award, Helen Mirren received the Empire Legend Award and Danny Boyle received the Outstanding Contribution Award. Philip Askins from the United Kingdom won the Done In 60 Seconds Award for his 60-second film version of Blade Runner.

== Winners and nominees ==
Winners are listed first and highlighted in boldface.

**Best Film**: **Skyfall**; Django Unchained; The Avengers; The Dark Knight Rises; The Hobbit: An Unexpected Journey	**Best British Film**: **Sightseers**; Dredd; Les Misérables; Skyfall; The Woman in Black
**Best Director**: **Sam Mendes — Skyfall**; Christopher Nolan — The Dark Knight Rises; Joss Whedon — The Avengers; Peter Jackson — The Hobbit: An Unexpected Journey; Quentin Tarantino — Django Unchained	
**Best Actor**: **Martin Freeman — The Hobbit: An Unexpected Journey**; Christoph Waltz — Django Unchained; Daniel Craig — Skyfall; Daniel Day-Lewis — Lincoln; Robert Downey Jr. — The Avengers	**Best Actress**: **Jennifer Lawrence — The Hunger Games**; Anne Hathaway — The Dark Knight Rises; Jessica Chastain — Zero Dark Thirty; Judi Dench — Skyfall; Naomi Watts — The Impossible
**Best Male Newcomer**: **Tom Holland — The Impossible**; Domhnall Gleeson — Anna Karenina; Rafe Spall — Life of Pi; Steve Oram — Sightseers; Suraj Sharma — Life of Pi	**Best Female Newcomer**: **Samantha Barks — Les Misérables**; Alice Lowe — Sightseers; Alicia Vikander — Anna Karenina; Holliday Grainger — Great Expectations; Quvenzhané Wallis — Beasts of the Southern Wild
**Best Comedy**: **Ted**; 21 Jump Street; Moonrise Kingdom; Silver Linings Playbook; The Pirates! In an Adventure with Scientists!	**Best Horror**: **The Woman in Black**; Dark Shadows; Sightseers; Sinister; The Cabin in the Woods
**Best Sci-Fi/Fantasy**: **The Hobbit: An Unexpected Journey**; Dredd; Looper; Prometheus; The Avengers	**Best Thriller**: **Headhunters**; Argo; Skyfall; The Raid; Zero Dark Thirty
**The Art of 3D**: **Dredd**; Life of Pi; Prometheus; The Avengers; The Hobbit: An Unexpected Journey	**Done In 60 Seconds**: **United Kingdom: Blade Runner by Philip Askins** (Note: Done In 60 Seconds: Blade Runner by Philip Askins on YouTube); Finalists: Kazakhstan: Twilight by Sergey Litovchenko (Note: Done In 60 Seconds: Twilight by Sergey Litovchenko on YouTube); Russia: Fear and Loathing in Las Vegas by Olga Goldfarb (Note: Done In 60 Seconds: Fear and Loathing in Las Vegas by Olga Goldfarb on YouTube); Russia: Red H. (Memento) by Andrei Dzhunkovsky (Note: Done In 60 Seconds: Red H. (Memento) by Andrei Dzhunkovsky on YouTube); United Kingdom: Argo by Mark Hampton & Mark Wong (Note: Done In 60 Seconds: Argo by Mark Hampton & Mark Wong on YouTube); The other shortlisted films: Japan: Reservoir Dogs by Naomi Nemoto (Note: Done In 60 Seconds: Reservoir Dogs by Naomi Nemoto on YouTube); Romania: Skyfall by Razvan Mera (Note: Done In 60 Seconds: Skyfall by Razvan Mera on YouTube); United Kingdom: RoboCop by Michael Hall (Note: Done In 60 Seconds: RoboCop by Michael Hall on YouTube); United Kingdom: The Italian Job by Oliver Graves & Matthew Brackenbury (Note: Done In 60 Seconds: The Italian Job by Oliver Graves & Matthew Brackenbury on YouTube); United Kingdom: You Only Live Twice by Charlie Hall (Note: Done In 60 Seconds: You Only Live Twice by Charlie Hall on YouTube); Unknown: Amadeus by Tsakoumi Aliki, Margaritidou Dimitra & Arapis Menippos (Note: Done In 60 Seconds: Amadeus by Tsakoumi Aliki, Margaritidou Dimitra & Arapis Menippos on YouTube); Unknown: Atlas Cloud (Cloud Atlas) by Irina Kolotova (Note: Done In 60 Seconds: Atlas Cloud by Irina Kolotova on YouTube); Unknown: Broccoliman by Svetlana Gubanova (Note: Done In 60 Seconds: Broccoliman by Svetlana Gubanova on YouTube); Unknown: Forrest Gulp (Forrest Gump) by Curro Guerrero (Note: Done In 60 Seconds: Forrest Gulp by Curro Guerrero on YouTube); Unknown: Inception by Ben Oringer (Note: Done In 60 Seconds: Inception by Ben Oringer on YouTube); Unknown: Jaws by Elisabeth Wanzenböck (Note: Done In 60 Seconds: Jaws by Elisabeth Wanzenböck on YouTube); Unknown: Mad Max by Esmir Prlja & Damir Ruvić (Note: Done In 60 Seconds: Mad Max by Esmir Prlja & Damir Ruvić on YouTube); Unknown: Scream by Petr Černý (Note: Done In 60 Seconds: Scream by Petr Černý on YouTube); Unknown: Ted by Nikolay Ivanov (Note: Done In 60 Seconds: Ted by Nikolay Ivanov on YouTube); Unknown: The Expendables by Oleksandr Shevchenko (Note: Done In 60 Seconds: The Expendables by Oleksandr Shevchenko on YouTube); Unknown: The Usual Suspects by Milos Ljubomirović (Note: Done In 60 Seconds: The Usual Suspects by Milos Ljubomirović on YouTube); Unknown: Untouchable (The Intouchables) by Eugene Zhukov (Note: Done In 60 Seconds: Untouchable by Eugene Zhukov on YouTube); Unknown: xXx by João Alves (Note: Done In 60 Seconds: xXx by João Alves on YouTube)
**Honorary Awards**: Empire Hero Award: **Daniel Radcliffe**; Empire Inspiration Award: **Sam Mendes**; Empire Legend Award: **Helen Mirren**; Outstanding Contribution Award: **Danny Boyle**

=== Multiple awards ===
The following two films received multiple awards:

Awards	Film
2	Skyfall
2	The Hobbit: An Unexpected Journey

=== Multiple nominations ===
The following 14 films received multiple nominations:

Nominations	Film
6	Skyfall
5	The Avengers
5	The Hobbit: An Unexpected Journey
4	Sightseers
3	Django Unchained
3	Dredd
3	Life of Pi
3	The Dark Knight Rises
2	Anna Karenina
2	Les Misérables
2	Prometheus
2	The Impossible
2	The Woman in Black
2	Zero Dark Thirty
