= 20th Empire Awards =

2015 British film awards ceremony

- The logo for the 20th Empire Awards
- Date: 29 March 2015
- Site: Grosvenor House Hotel, London, England
- Hosted by: James Nesbitt

Highlights
- Best Film: Interstellar
- Best British Film: Kingsman: The Secret Service
- Most awards: Interstellar and Kingsman: The Secret Service (2)
- Most nominations: The Imitation Game (6)

The 20th Empire Awards ceremony (officially known as the Jameson Empire Awards), presented by the British film magazine Empire, honored the best films of 2014 and took place on 29 March 2015 at the Grosvenor House Hotel in London, England. During the ceremony, Empire presented Empire Awards in 12 categories as well as three honorary awards. Irish actor James Nesbitt hosted the show for the second consecutive year. The awards were sponsored by Jameson Irish Whiskey for the seventh consecutive year.

Interstellar won two awards including Best Film and Best Director for Christopher Nolan. Other winners included Kingsman: The Secret Service also with two awards and Dawn of the Planet of the Apes, Gone Girl, Guardians of the Galaxy, Oculus, Paddington, The Babadook, The Imitation Game and X-Men: Days of Future Past with one. The cast of Game of Thrones received the Empire Hero Award, Christopher Nolan received the Empire Inspiration Award and Ralph Fiennes received the Empire Legend Award. Oliver Jones & Robert Kenyon from the United Kingdom won the Done In 60 Seconds Award for their 60-second film version of Ghostbusters.

== Winners and nominees ==
Winners are listed first and highlighted in boldface.

**Best Film**: **Interstellar**; Boyhood; Dawn of the Planet of the Apes; The Hobbit: The Battle of the Five Armies; The Imitation Game	**Best British Film**: **Kingsman: The Secret Service**; Paddington; The Imitation Game; The Theory of Everything; Under the Skin
**Best Director**: **Christopher Nolan — Interstellar**; Matt Reeves — Dawn of the Planet of the Apes; Morten Tyldum — The Imitation Game; Peter Jackson — The Hobbit: The Battle of the Five Armies; Richard Linklater — Boyhood	
**Best Actor**: **Andy Serkis — Dawn of the Planet of the Apes**; Benedict Cumberbatch — The Imitation Game; Bradley Cooper — American Sniper; Eddie Redmayne — The Theory of Everything; Richard Armitage — The Hobbit: The Battle of the Five Armies	**Best Actress**: **Rosamund Pike — Gone Girl**; Alicia Vikander — Ex Machina; Emily Blunt — Edge of Tomorrow; Felicity Jones — The Theory of Everything; Keira Knightley — The Imitation Game
**Best Male Newcomer**: **Taron Egerton — Kingsman: The Secret Service**; Dan Stevens — The Guest; Daniel Huttlestone — Into the Woods; Ellar Coltrane — Boyhood; Jack O'Connell — Unbroken	**Best Female Newcomer**: **Karen Gillan — Oculus and Guardians of the Galaxy**; Carrie Coon — Gone Girl; Essie Davis — The Babadook; Gugu Mbatha-Raw — Belle; Sophie Cookson — Kingsman: The Secret Service
**Best Comedy**: **Paddington**; 22 Jump Street; The Grand Budapest Hotel; The Inbetweeners 2; The Lego Movie	**Best Horror**: **The Babadook**; Annabelle; Oculus; The Guest; Under the Skin
**Best Sci-Fi/Fantasy**: **X-Men: Days of Future Past**; Dawn of the Planet of the Apes; Guardians of the Galaxy; Interstellar; The Hobbit: The Battle of the Five Armies	**Best Thriller**: **The Imitation Game**; Captain America: The Winter Soldier; Gone Girl; Kingsman: The Secret Service; Locke
**Done In 60 Seconds**: **United Kingdom: Ghostbusters by Oliver Jones & Robert Kenyon** (Note: Done In 60 Seconds: Ghostbusters by Oliver Jones & Robert Kenyon on YouTube)	**Honorary Awards**: Empire Hero Award: **The cast of Game of Thrones**; Empire Inspiration Award: **Christopher Nolan**; Empire Legend Award: **Ralph Fiennes**

=== Multiple awards ===
The following two films received multiple awards:

Awards	Film
2	Interstellar
2	Kingsman: The Secret Service

=== Multiple nominations ===
The following 14 films received multiple nominations:

Nominations	Film
6	The Imitation Game
4	Dawn of the Planet of the Apes
4	Kingsman: The Secret Service
4	The Hobbit: The Battle of the Five Armies
3	Boyhood
3	Gone Girl
3	Interstellar
3	The Theory of Everything
2	Guardians of the Galaxy
2	Oculus
2	Paddington
2	The Babadook
2	The Guest
2	Under the Skin
