= Done In 60 Seconds Award =

Former annual British film award

- Awarded for: Best 60-second remake of the year
- Country: United Kingdom
- Presented by: Empire magazine
- First award: 2008
- Currently held by: David Smith (United Kingdom) - There Will Be Blood (Milk) (2014)
- Website: http://www.jamesonempirediss.com/

The Done In 60 Seconds Award (abbreviated DISS) is an award presented annually by the British film magazine Empire to the winner of that year's Done In 60 Seconds Competition, in which participants recreate a known film in 60-seconds. The Done In 60 Seconds Award was first introduced at the 13th Empire Awards in 2008, with Nick Jesper from the United Kingdom receiving the award for his 60-second version of Titanic. The competition was open for its first two years only to entries from the United Kingdom and has since become an international competition with each participating country selecting its own local winner (or number of finalists) which then joins the global shortlist of films, from which a panel of judges selects the global winner.

The 2015 competition will be running in the following countries: Armenia, Brazil, Bulgaria, Greece, Kazakhstan, Poland, Russia, Serbia and the United Kingdom. The start date for the 2015 entries was October 29, 2014 at 12:00 and the closing date for entries will be January 31, 2015 at 23:59. The local winners will be showcased at the 20th Empire Awards on March 29, 2015 where a panel of judges will choose the Global Done In 60 Seconds winner.

Since its inception, the award has been given to five United Kingdom winners. Other winners include Kazakhstan and the Netherlands with one award each. David Smith from the United Kingdom is the most recent winner in this category for There Will Be Blood (Milk), his 60-second film version of There Will Be Blood.

== Done In 60 Seconds competition ==
The Done In 60 Seconds competition was first introduced at the 13th Empire Awards in 2008, then open only to entries from the United Kingdom and it continued to be a United Kingdom only competition for its second appearance at the 14th Empire Awards in 2009. The competition was first opened to international entries at the 15th Empire Awards in 2010 and has since remained an international competition with eligible countries changing each year. The 15th Empire Awards also introduced The Global Final ceremony, where the shortlisted directors were invited to London where a group of judges chose the five finalist films. The Global Final was held for 5 consecutive award ceremonies between the 15th to 19th Empire Awards in 2014 and was discontinued at the 20th Empire Awards in 2015.

The 1st Done In 60 Seconds Competition Global Final was held on March 26, 2010 at 24 Club, London, England. The team of judges consisted of Empire editor-in-chief Mark Dinning, English actor Jason Isaacs and English director Edgar Wright, which selected from a shortlist of 20 nominees the five Done In 60 Seconds Award finalists that were invited to the Empire Awards where the winner was announced.

The 2nd Done In 60 Seconds Competition Global Final was held on March 25, 2011 at the London Film Museum, London, England. The team of judges consisted of Empire editor-in-chief Mark Dinning, Irish actor and comedian Chris O'Dowd and English director Neil Marshall, which selected from a shortlist of 24 nominees the five Done In 60 Seconds Award finalists that were invited to the Empire Awards where the winner was announced.

The 3rd Done In 60 Seconds Competition Global Final was held on March 23, 2012 at the London Film Museum, London, England. The team of judges consisted of Empire editor-in-chief Mark Dinning, Sky Movies Premiere English presenter Alex Zane, Irish actor and comedian Chris O'Dowd and English director Gareth Edwards, which selected from a shortlist of 28 nominees the five Done In 60 Seconds Award finalists that were invited to the Empire Awards where the winner was announced.

The 4th Done In 60 Seconds Competition Global Final was held on March 22, 2013 at the Google Campus, London, England. The team of judges consisted of Empire editor-in-chief Mark Dinning, Bauer Media CEO Paul Keenan, Sky Movies Premiere, English presenter Alex Zane, Scottish radio DJ Edith Bowman and English actors Joanne Froggatt and Tom Hiddleston, which selected from a shortlist of 23 nominees the five Done In 60 Seconds Award finalists that were invited to the Empire Awards where the winner was announced.

The 5th Done In 60 Seconds Competition Global Final was held on March 29, 2014 at The Brewery, London, England. The team of judges consisted of Empire editor-in-chief Mark Dinning, Sky Movies Premiere English presenter Alex Zane, Scottish radio DJ Edith Bowman, Scottish director Jon S. Baird and English director Ben Wheatley, which selected from a shortlist of 24 nominees the five Done In 60 Seconds Award finalists that were invited to the Empire Awards where the winner was announced.

The 2014 competition was open to entries from 22 countries, including: Armenia, Bosnia, Brazil, Bulgaria, Croatia, Czech Republic, Greece, India, Israel, Kazakhstan, Portugal, Romania, Russia, Serbia, Ukraine and the United Kingdom.

== Current competition ==
The 2015 competition will be running in the following countries: Armenia, Brazil, Bulgaria, Greece, Kazakhstan, Poland, Russia, Serbia and the United Kingdom. The start date for the 2015 United Kingdom entries was October 29, 2014 at 12:00 and the closing date for entries will be January 31, 2015 at 23:59. On February 20, 2015 a shortlist of 20 United Kingdom entries that the judging panel consider to be the most entertaining and technically competent entries will be published on the competition website with members of the public voting for their favorite film. The voting will close on March 6, 2015 and on March 13, 2015 the name of the most popular United Kingdom shortlist entry, based on the number of votes, will be chosen. As a change from previous years, there will not be a Global Final held where a panel of judges choose the 5 finalist films, instead the United Kingdom winner will join the other winners from the other participating countries and will be showcased at the 20th Empire Awards on March 29, 2015 where a panel of judges will choose the Global Done In 60 Seconds winner.

== Winners and nominees ==
In the list below, winners are listed first in boldface, followed by the other nominees. The number of the ceremony (1st, 2nd, etc.) appears in parentheses after the awards year, linked to the article (if any) on that ceremony.

=== 2000s ===
Year	Country	Director	Film	Link	Ref.
**2008** **(13th)**	**United Kingdom**	**Nick Jesper**	**Titanic**	(Note: Done In 60 Seconds: Titanic by Nick Jesper on YouTube)	
**2008** **(13th)**	**Finalists**				
**2008** **(13th)**	United Kingdom	George Pursall & Thomas Stock	Alien	(Note: Done In 60 Seconds: Alien by George Pursall & Thomas Stock on YouTube)	
**2008** **(13th)**	United Kingdom	Ellie Rogers	Atonement	(Note: Done In 60 Seconds: Atonement by Ellie Rogers on YouTube)	
**2008** **(13th)**	United Kingdom	Phil Heeks	Close Encounters of the Third Kind	(Note: Done In 60 Seconds: Close Encounters of the Third Kind by Phil Heeks on YouTube)	
**2008** **(13th)**	United Kingdom	Mark Hampton	Speed	(Note: Done In 60 Seconds: Speed by Mark Hampton on YouTube)	
**2008** **(13th)**	**The other shortlisted films**				
**2008** **(13th)**	United Kingdom	Lynsey Yarnell	Back to the Future		
**2008** **(13th)**	United Kingdom	Ryhs Owain	Dino-Empire (Jurassic Park)		
**2008** **(13th)**	United Kingdom	Tim Chivers	Evil Dead II	(Note: Done In 60 Seconds: Evil Dead II by Tim Chivers on YouTube)	
**2008** **(13th)**	United Kingdom	Oliver Hollingdale	Harry Potter		
**2008** **(13th)**	United Kingdom	Liam Johnston	Nosferatu		
**2008** **(13th)**	United Kingdom	Tom Marshall	Rambo: First Blood	(Note: Done In 60 Seconds: Rambo: First Blood by Tom Marshall on YouTube)	
**2008** **(13th)**	United Kingdom	Alison Goldsmith	Saving Private Ryan	(Note: Done In 60 Seconds: Saving Private Ryan by Alison Goldsmith on YouTube)	
**2008** **(13th)**	United Kingdom	Dan Horn	The Seventh Seal	(Note: Done In 60 Seconds: The Seventh Seal by Dan Horn on YouTube)	
**2008** **(13th)**	United Kingdom	Matt Bigwood	The Dam Busters	(Note: Done In 60 Seconds: The Dam Busters by Matt Bigwood on YouTube)	
**2008** **(13th)**	United Kingdom	Henry S & Matt D	The Shining	(Note: Done In 60 Seconds: The Shining by Henry S & Matt D on YouTube)	
**2009** **(14th)**	**United Kingdom**	**Stephen Power & Conal O'Meara**	**Jerry Maguire**	(Note: Done In 60 Seconds: Jerry Maguire by Stephen Power & Conal O'Meara on YouTube)	
**2009** **(14th)**	**Finalists**				
**2009** **(14th)**	United Kingdom	Ewan Smith	Cloverfield	(Note: Done In 60 Seconds: Cloverfield by Ewan Smith on YouTube)	
**2009** **(14th)**	United Kingdom	Mark Hampton	Pearl Harbor	(Note: Done In 60 Seconds: Pearl Harbor by Mark Hampton on YouTube)	
**2009** **(14th)**	United Kingdom	Ewan Warburton	Se7en	(Note: Done In 60 Seconds: Se7en by Ewan Warburton on YouTube)	
**2009** **(14th)**	United Kingdom	Steven Seller	The Dark Knight	(Note: Done In 60 Seconds: The Dark Knight by Steven Seller on YouTube)	
**2009** **(14th)**	**The other shortlisted films**				
**2009** **(14th)**	United Kingdom	Mike Doxford	American Psycho	(Note: Done In 60 Seconds: American Psycho by Mike Doxford on YouTube)	
**2009** **(14th)**	United Kingdom	Will Tribble	Forrest Gump	(Note: Done In 60 Seconds: Forrest Gump by Will Tribble on YouTube)	
**2009** **(14th)**	United Kingdom	Charlie Lyne	Requiem for a Dream	(Note: Done In 60 Seconds: Requiem for a Dream by Charlie Lyne on YouTube)	
**2009** **(14th)**	United Kingdom	Harry Lindley	Reservoir Dogs	(Note: Done In 60 Seconds: Reservoir Dogs by Harry Lindley on YouTube)	
**2009** **(14th)**	United Kingdom	Katie Child	Terminator 2: Judgment Minute (Terminator 2: Judgment Day)		
**2009** **(14th)**	United Kingdom	Martin Selby & Tom Marshall	The Fugitive	(Note: Done In 60 Seconds: The Fugitive by Martin Selby & Tom Marshall on YouTube)	
**2009** **(14th)**	United Kingdom	Melanie Keyzor	WALL-E	(Note: Done In 60 Seconds: WALL-E by Melanie Keyzor on YouTube)	

=== 2010s ===
Year	Country	Director	Film	Link	Ref.
**2010** **(15th)**	**United Kingdom**	**Mark Hampton**	**Top Gun**	(Note: Done In 60 Seconds: Top Gun by Mark Hampton on YouTube)	
**2010** **(15th)**	**Finalists**				
**2010** **(15th)**	Ireland	Tom Rowley	There Will Be Less Blood (There Will Be Blood)	(Note: Done In 60 Seconds: There Will Be Blood by Tom Rowley on YouTube)	
**2010** **(15th)**	Russia	Andrew Akulina	True Lies	(Note: Done In 60 Seconds: True Lies by Andrew Akulina on YouTube)	
**2010** **(15th)**	United Kingdom	Lee Hardcastle	The Evil Dead	(Note: Done In 60 Seconds: The Evil Dead by Lee Hardcastle on YouTube)	
**2010** **(15th)**	United Kingdom	Michael Whaite	Who Framed Roger Rabbit	(Note: Done In 60 Seconds: Who Framed Roger Rabbit by Michael Whaite on YouTube)	
	The other shortlisted films				
	Ireland	Kevin de la Isla O'Neill	The Departed		
**2011** **(16th)**	**Netherlands**	**Maeve Stam**	**127 Hours**	(Note: Done In 60 Seconds: 127 Hours by Maeve Stam on YouTube)	
**2011** **(16th)**	**Finalists**				
**2011** **(16th)**	Russia	Valentina Kurochkina & Sergey Potapov	Avatar	(Note: Done In 60 Seconds: Avatar by Valentina Kurochkina & Sergey Potapov on YouTube)	
**2011** **(16th)**	Sweden	Samuel Heiligers, Frej Bengtsson & Stefan Lundaahl	Indiana Jones (Raiders of the Lost Ark)	(Note: Done In 60 Seconds: Indiana Jones by Samuel Heiligers, Frej Bengtsson & Stefan Lundaahl on YouTube)	
**2011** **(16th)**	United Kingdom	Lee Hardcastle	The Exorcist	(Note: Done In 60 Seconds: The Exorcist by Lee Hardcastle on YouTube)	
**2011** **(16th)**	United Kingdom	Michael Whaite	The Lion King	(Note: Done In 60 Seconds: The Lion King by Michael Whaite on YouTube)	
**2011** **(16th)**	**The other shortlisted films**				
**2011** **(16th)**	Bulgaria	Marian Georgiev	Valkyrie	(Note: Done In 60 Seconds: Valkyrie by Marian Georgiev on YouTube)	
**2011** **(16th)**	Chile	Rodrigo Reyes Santander	Aliens	(Note: Done In 60 Seconds: Aliens by Rodrigo Reyes Santander on YouTube)	
**2011** **(16th)**	Germany	Negian Haddad Kaveh	Léon: The Professional	(Note: Done In 60 Seconds: Léon: The Professional by Negian Haddad Kaveh on YouTube)	
**2011** **(16th)**	Ireland	Chris Lodge	The Expendables	(Note: Done In 60 Seconds: The Expendables by Chris Lodge on YouTube)	
**2011** **(16th)**	Ireland	Kevin De La Isla	Shadow of the Vampire	(Note: Done In 60 Seconds: Shadow of the Vampire by Kevin De La Isla on YouTube)	
**2011** **(16th)**	Kazakhstan	Andrey Manuilov	The Dark Knight	(Note: Done In 60 Seconds: The Dark Knight by Andrey Manuilov on YouTube)	
**2011** **(16th)**	Poland	Michael Mank & Jacek Wlodarczyk	James Bond	(Note: Done In 60 Seconds: James Bond by Michael Mank & Jacek Wlodarczyk on YouTube)	
**2011** **(16th)**	Russia	Petr Lisovisky & Artur Ostapenko	Inception	(Note: Done In 60 Seconds: Inception by Petr Lisovisky & Artur Ostapenko on YouTube)	
**2011** **(16th)**	Russia	Dmitry Vasiyev & Zhanna Boyarintseva	Jaws	(Note: Done In 60 Seconds: Jaws by Dmitry Vasiyev & Zhanna Boyarintseva on YouTube)	
**2011** **(16th)**	Russia	Olga Busorgina & Andrey Kilin	Transformers Grindhouse (Transformers)	(Note: Done In 60 Seconds: Transformers Grindhouse by Olga Busorgina & Andrey Kilin on YouTube)	
**2011** **(16th)**	Russia	Vadi Talanov & Dmitry Korobeynikov	Charlie Chaplin	(Note: Done In 60 Seconds: Charlie Chaplin by Vadi Talanov & Dmitry Korobeynikov on YouTube)	
**2011** **(16th)**	Sweden	Joshua Petsonk & Hanni Serag	Psycho	(Note: Done In 60 Seconds: Psycho by Joshua Petsonk & Hanni Serag on YouTube)	
**2011** **(16th)**	Turkey	Çagil Ivak	Dr. Strangelove	(Note: Done In 60 Seconds: Dr. Strangelove by Çagil Ivak on YouTube)	
**2011** **(16th)**	Turkey	Esat Can	12 Angry Men	(Note: Done In 60 Seconds: 12 Angry Men by Esat Can on YouTube)	
**2011** **(16th)**	Ukraine	Mykhailo Orlov	2001: A Space Odyssey	(Note: Done In 60 Seconds: 2001: A Space Odyssey by Mykhailo Orlov on YouTube)	
**2011** **(16th)**	Ukraine	Vladyslav Trifinov	Inglourious Basterds	Missing link	
**2011** **(16th)**	United Kingdom	Jack Kendall	The Social Network	(Note: Done In 60 Seconds: The Social Network by Jack Kendall on YouTube)	
**2011** **(16th)**	United Kingdom	Simon Jago, Ryan Casey & Clark Brady	300	(Note: Done In 60 Seconds: 300 by Simon Jago, Ryan Casey & Clark Brady on YouTube)	
**2011** **(16th)**	United Kingdom	Gareth Soens Hughes	Predator	(Note: Done In 60 Seconds: Predator by Gareth Soens Hughes on YouTube)	
**2012** **(17th)**	**Kazakhstan**	**Indira Suleimenova**	**Black Swan**	(Note: Done In 60 Seconds: Black Swan by Indira Suleimenova on YouTube)	
**2012** **(17th)**	**Finalists**				
**2012** **(17th)**	Bulgaria	Rosen Lliev	Edward Scissorhands	(Note: Done In 60 Seconds: Edward Scissorhands by Rosen Lliev on YouTube)	
**2012** **(17th)**	Chile	Gonzalo Ruiz & Joaquin Vergara	Spider-Man	(Note: Done In 60 Seconds: Spider-Man by Gonzalo Ruiz & Joaquin Vergara on YouTube)	
**2012** **(17th)**	Ireland	Andrew Norton	District 9	(Note: Done In 60 Seconds: District 9 by Andrew Norton on YouTube)	
**2012** **(17th)**	United Kingdom	Philip Askins	Herge's Raiders of the Lost Ark (The Adventures of Tintin and Raiders of the Lost Ark)	(Note: Done In 60 Seconds: Herge's Raiders of the Lost Ark by Philip Askins on YouTube)	
**2012** **(17th)**	**The other shortlisted films**				
**2012** **(17th)**	Belgium	Marie Hologne	Titanic	(Note: Done In 60 Seconds: Titanic by Marie Hologne on YouTube)	
**2012** **(17th)**	Belgium	Alexis Berthelot & Anouchka	The Jetty	(Note: Done In 60 Seconds: The Jetty by Alexis Berthelot & Anouchka on YouTube)	
**2012** **(17th)**	Czech Republic	Unknown Director	Forrest Gump	(Note: Done In 60 Seconds: Forrest Gump by Unknown Director on YouTube)	
**2012** **(17th)**	Germany	Ferenc Horváth	Buried	(Note: Done In 60 Seconds: Buried by Ferenc Horváth on YouTube)	
**2012** **(17th)**	India	Arati Kadav	Eternal Sunshine of the Spotless Mind	(Note: Done In 60 Seconds: Eternal Sunshine of the Spotless Mind by Arati Kadav on YouTube)	
**2012** **(17th)**	India	Mayank Shethiya	Fight Club	(Note: Done In 60 Seconds: Fight Club by Mayank Shethiya on YouTube)	
**2012** **(17th)**	Israel	Boris Shurp	Limitless	(Note: Done In 60 Seconds: Limitless by Boris Shurp on YouTube)	
**2012** **(17th)**	Latvia	Jānis Ābele	Fantastic Mr Fox	(Note: Done In 60 Seconds: Fantastic Mr Fox by Jānis Ābele on YouTube)	
**2012** **(17th)**	Netherlands	Stephane Kaas	Drive	(Note: Done In 60 Seconds: Drive by Stephane Kaas on YouTube)	
**2012** **(17th)**	Portugal	Nuno Gervásio	The King's Speech	(Note: Done In 60 Seconds: The King's Speech by Nuno Gervásio on YouTube)	
**2012** **(17th)**	Romania	Vlad Andrei Ghinea	The Birds	(Note: Done In 60 Seconds: The Birds by Vlad Andrei Ghinea on YouTube)	
**2012** **(17th)**	Russia	Роман Бубнов	Commando	(Note: Done In 60 Seconds: Commando by Роман Бубнов on YouTube)	
**2012** **(17th)**	Russia	Ilya Subbotin	In Time	(Note: Done In 60 Seconds: In Time by Ilya Subbotin on YouTube)	
**2012** **(17th)**	Russia	Andrey Kilin	Pirates of the Caribbean	(Note: Done In 60 Seconds: Pirates of the Caribbean by Andrey Kilin on YouTube)	
**2012** **(17th)**	Russia	Potapov Sergey	TransfomeRUS (Transformers)	(Note: Done In 60 Seconds: TransfomeRUS by Potapov Sergey on YouTube)	
**2012** **(17th)**	Russia	Yaroslav Denisov	The Godfather	(Note: Done In 60 Seconds: The Godfather by Yaroslav Denisov on YouTube)	
**2012** **(17th)**	Serbia	Marko Kovac̈	Psycho	(Note: Done In 60 Seconds: Psycho by Marko Kovac on YouTube)	
**2012** **(17th)**	Sweden	Stefan Lundaahl, Samuel Heiligers & Frej Bengtsson	Free Willy	(Note: Done In 60 Seconds: Free Willy by Stefan Lundaahl, Samuel Heiligers & Frej Bengtsson on YouTube)	
**2012** **(17th)**	Ukraine	Nataliya Shevchenko	Se7en	(Note: Done In 60 Seconds: Se7en by Nataliya Shevchenko on YouTube)	
**2012** **(17th)**	United Kingdom	Simon Jago	The Thing (Prequel)	(Note: Done In 60 Seconds: The Thing (Prequel) by Simon Jago on YouTube)	
**2012** **(17th)**	United Kingdom	David Smith	War Horse	(Note: Done In 60 Seconds: War Horse by David Smith on YouTube)	
**2012** **(17th)**	United Kingdom	Jack Kendall	The King's Speech	(Note: Done In 60 Seconds: The King's Speech by Jack Kendall on YouTube)	
**2012** **(17th)**	United Kingdom	Michael Whaite	The Star Wars Prequel Trilogy	(Note: Done In 60 Seconds: The Star Wars Prequel Trilogy by Michael Whaite on YouTube)	
**2012** **(17th)**	Unknown	Nikolaus Suchentrunk	The Birds	(Note: Done In 60 Seconds: The Birds by Nikolaus Suchentrunk on YouTube)	
**2013** **(18th)**	**United Kingdom**	**Philip Askins**	**Blade Runner**	(Note: Done In 60 Seconds: Blade Runner by Philip Askins on YouTube)	
**2013** **(18th)**	**Finalists**				
**2013** **(18th)**	Kazakhstan	Sergey Litovchenko	Twilight	(Note: Done In 60 Seconds: Twilight by Sergey Litovchenko on YouTube)	
**2013** **(18th)**	Russia	Olga Goldfarb	Fear and Loathing in Las Vegas	(Note: Done In 60 Seconds: Fear and Loathing in Las Vegas by Olga Goldfarb on YouTube)	
**2013** **(18th)**	Russia	Andrei Dzhunkovsky	Red H. (Memento)	(Note: Done In 60 Seconds: Red H. (Memento) by Andrei Dzhunkovsky on YouTube)	
**2013** **(18th)**	United Kingdom	Mark Hampton	Argo	(Note: Done In 60 Seconds: Argo by Mark Hampton on YouTube)	
**2013** **(18th)**	**The other shortlisted films**				
**2013** **(18th)**	Japan	Naomi Nemoto	Reservoir Dogs	(Note: Done In 60 Seconds: Reservoir Dogs by Naomi Nemoto on YouTube)	
**2013** **(18th)**	Romania	Razvan Mera	Skyfall	(Note: Done In 60 Seconds: Skyfall by Razvan Mera on YouTube)	
**2013** **(18th)**	United Kingdom	Michael Hall	RoboCop	(Note: Done In 60 Seconds: RoboCop by Michael Hall on YouTube)	
**2013** **(18th)**	United Kingdom	Oliver Graves & Matthew Brackenbury	The Italian Job	(Note: Done In 60 Seconds: The Italian Job by Oliver Graves & Matthew Brackenbury on YouTube)	
**2013** **(18th)**	United Kingdom	Charlie Hall	You Only Live Twice	(Note: Done In 60 Seconds: You Only Live Twice by Charlie Hall on YouTube)	
**2013** **(18th)**	Unknown	Curro Guerrero	Forrest Gulp (Forrest Gump)	(Note: Done In 60 Seconds: Forrest Gulp by Curro Guerrero on YouTube)	
**2013** **(18th)**	Unknown	Esmir Prlja & Damir Ruvić	Mad Max	(Note: Done In 60 Seconds: Mad Max by Esmir Prlja & Damir Ruvić on YouTube)	
**2013** **(18th)**	Unknown	João Alves	xXx	(Note: Done In 60 Seconds: xXx by João Alves on YouTube)	
**2013** **(18th)**	Unknown	Ben Oringer	Inception	(Note: Done In 60 Seconds: Inception by Ben Oringer on YouTube)	
**2013** **(18th)**	Unknown	Milos Ljubomirović	The Usual Suspects	(Note: Done In 60 Seconds: The Usual Suspects by Milos Ljubomirović on YouTube)	
**2013** **(18th)**	Unknown	Petr Černý	Scream	(Note: Done In 60 Seconds: Scream by Petr Černý on YouTube)	
**2013** **(18th)**	Unknown	Irina Kolotova	Atlas Cloud (Cloud Atlas)	(Note: Done In 60 Seconds: Atlas Cloud by Irina Kolotova on YouTube)	
**2013** **(18th)**	Unknown	Eugene Zhukov	Untouchable (The Intouchables)	(Note: Done In 60 Seconds: Untouchable by Eugene Zhukov on YouTube)	
**2013** **(18th)**	Unknown	Tsakoumi Aliki, Margaritidou Dimitra & Arapis Menippos	Amadeus	(Note: Done In 60 Seconds: Amadeus by Tsakoumi Aliki, Margaritidou Dimitra & Arapis Menippos on YouTube)	
**2013** **(18th)**	Unknown	Oleksandr Shevchenko	The Expendables	(Note: Done In 60 Seconds: The Expendables by Oleksandr Shevchenko on YouTube)	
**2013** **(18th)**	Unknown	Svetlana Gubanova	Broccoliman	(Note: Done In 60 Seconds: Broccoliman by Svetlana Gubanova on YouTube)	
**2013** **(18th)**	Unknown	Nikolay Ivanov	Ted	(Note: Done In 60 Seconds: Ted by Nikolay Ivanov on YouTube)	
**2013** **(18th)**	Unknown	Elisabeth Wanzenböck	Jaws	(Note: Done In 60 Seconds: Jaws by Elisabeth Wanzenböck on YouTube)	
**2014** **(19th)**	**United Kingdom**	**David Smith**	**There Will Be Blood (Milk) (There Will Be Blood)**	(Note: Done In 60 Seconds: There Will Be Blood (Milk) by David Smith on YouTube)	
**2014** **(19th)**	**Finalists**				
**2014** **(19th)**	Israel	Leigh Lahav	Gravity	(Note: Done In 60 Seconds: Gravity by Leigh Lahav on YouTube)	
**2014** **(19th)**	Portugal	João Carrilho	Vertigo	(Note: Done In 60 Seconds: Vertigo by João Carrilho on YouTube)	
**2014** **(19th)**	Russia	Ramil Karipov	Paranormal Activity: Bad Realtor (Paranormal Activity)	(Note: Done In 60 Seconds: Paranormal Activity: Bad Realtor by Ramil Karipov on YouTube)	
**2014** **(19th)**	United Kingdom	Michael Hall	Gravity in 2D (Gravity)	(Note: Done In 60 Seconds: Gravity in 2D by Michael Hall on YouTube)	
**2014** **(19th)**	**The other shortlisted films**				
**2014** **(19th)**	Armenia	Arsen Avdalyan	The Artist	(Note: Done In 60 Seconds: The Artist by Arsen Avdalyan on YouTube)	
**2014** **(19th)**	Bosnia	Jasmin Pivić	The Prestige	(Note: Done In 60 Seconds: The Prestige by Jasmin Pivić on YouTube)	
**2014** **(19th)**	Brazil	Fernanda Caruso & Tuca Zorzetto	Finding Nemo	(Note: Done In 60 Seconds: Finding Nemo by Fernanda Caruso & Tuca Zorzetto on YouTube)	
**2014** **(19th)**	Bulgaria	Dimitar Stafidov	BU Star Wars Episode IV (Star Wars)	(Note: Done In 60 Seconds: BU Star Wars Episode IV by Dimitar Stafidov on YouTube)	
**2014** **(19th)**	Croatia	Dinka Radonić	Memento	(Note: Done In 60 Seconds: Memento by Dinka Radonić on YouTube)	
**2014** **(19th)**	Czech Republic	Taťána Rubášová	American Beauty	(Note: Done In 60 Seconds: American Beauty by Taťána Rubášová on YouTube)	
**2014** **(19th)**	Greece	Ιoanna Sotiriou	Cast Away	(Note: Done In 60 Seconds: Cast Away by Ιoanna Sotiriou on YouTube)	
**2014** **(19th)**	India	Ritesh Varma	Modern Times	(Note: Done In 60 Seconds: Modern Times by Ritesh Varma on YouTube)	
**2014** **(19th)**	Kazakhstan	Diana Bimakhimova	Sherlock Holmes	(Note: Done In 60 Seconds: Sherlock Holmes by Diana Bimakhimova on YouTube)	
**2014** **(19th)**	Romania	Catalin Palavescu	The Wolverine	(Note: Done In 60 Seconds: The Wolverine by Catalin Palavescu on YouTube)	
**2014** **(19th)**	Russia	Alex Knyazeva	1+1 Intouchables (The Intouchables)	(Note: Done In 60 Seconds: 1+1 Intouchables by Alex Knyazeva on YouTube)	
**2014** **(19th)**	Russia	Lena Bubnova	Baking Bread (Breaking Bad)	(Note: Done In 60 Seconds: Baking Bread by Lena Bubnova on YouTube)	
**2014** **(19th)**	Russia	Sofia Anchugina	Gone in 60 Seconds	(Note: Done In 60 Seconds: Gone in 60 Seconds by Sofia Anchugina on YouTube)	
**2014** **(19th)**	Russia	Maria Vdovenko	Slumdog Millionaire	(Note: Done In 60 Seconds: Slumdog Millionaire by Maria Vdovenko on YouTube)	
**2014** **(19th)**	Serbia	Dragomir Leko	Pulp Fiction aka Pulp Fixed (Pulp Fiction)	(Note: Done In 60 Seconds: Pulp Fiction aka Pulp Fixed by Dragomir Leko on YouTube)	
**2014** **(19th)**	Ukraine	Liliana Tymoshenko	Leon Killer (Léon: The Professional)	(Note: Done In 60 Seconds: Leon Killer by Liliana Tymoshenko on YouTube)	
**2014** **(19th)**	United Kingdom	Tony Byrnes	Dead Poets Society	(Note: Done In 60 Seconds: Dead Poets Society by Tony Byrnes on YouTube)	
**2014** **(19th)**	United Kingdom	Jonathan Farrelly & Alice Toner	Manhattan	(Note: Done In 60 Seconds: Manhattan by Jonathan Farrelly & Alice Toner on YouTube)	
**2014** **(19th)**	United Kingdom	Claire Carter	The (con) Artist (The Artist)	(Note: Done In 60 Seconds: The (con) Artist by Claire Carter on YouTube)	

=== Notes ===
A: When there was a conflict regarding the director name between the Empire Awards official websites and the information provided in the film, the film information was chosen.
B: The official website for the 15th Empire Awards in 2010 only lists the United Kingdom nominees and finalists and not the global finalist list. The global finalist list was taken from an independent source.

== Award statistics ==
The following countries received the Global Done In 60 Seconds award:

Awards	Country
5	United Kingdom
1	Kazakhstan
1	Netherlands
