= Empire Award for Best Horror =

Former annual British film award

- Awarded for: Best horror film of the year
- Country: United Kingdom
- Presented by: Empire magazine
- First award: 2006
- Currently held by: Get Out (2018)

The Empire Award for Best Horror was an Empire Award presented annually by the British film magazine Empire to honor the best horror film of the previous year. The Empire Award for Best Horror was one of four new Best Film ongoing awards which were first introduced at the 11th Empire Awards ceremony in 2006 (along with Best Comedy, Best Sci-Fi/Fantasy and Best Thriller) with The Descent receiving the award. Get Out was the last winner in this category in 2018 event. Winners are voted by the readers of Empire magazine.

== Winners and nominees ==
In the list below, winners are listed first in boldface, followed by the other nominees. The number of the ceremony (1st, 2nd, etc.) appears in parentheses after the awards year, linked to the article (if any) on that ceremony.

=== 2000s ===
Year	Film	Ref.
**2006** **(11th)**	**The Descent**	(Note: The 11th Empire Awards in 2006 had four nominees (instead of the usual five) for Best Horror.)
**2006** **(11th)**	Land of the Dead	(Note: The 11th Empire Awards in 2006 had four nominees (instead of the usual five) for Best Horror.)
**2006** **(11th)**	The Skeleton Key	(Note: The 11th Empire Awards in 2006 had four nominees (instead of the usual five) for Best Horror.)
**2006** **(11th)**	Wolf Creek	(Note: The 11th Empire Awards in 2006 had four nominees (instead of the usual five) for Best Horror.)
**2007** **(12th)**	**Hostel**	
**2007** **(12th)**	Slither	
**2007** **(12th)**	The Hills Have Eyes	
**2007** **(12th)**	The Host	
**2007** **(12th)**	The Texas Chainsaw Massacre: The Beginning	
**2008** **(13th)**	**28 Weeks Later**	
**2008** **(13th)**	30 Days of Night	
**2008** **(13th)**	1408	
**2008** **(13th)**	Death Proof	
**2008** **(13th)**	Saw IV	
**2009** **(14th)**	**Eden Lake**	
**2009** **(14th)**	The Mist	
**2009** **(14th)**	The Orphanage	
**2009** **(14th)**	The Strangers	
**2009** **(14th)**	Sweeney Todd: The Demon Barber of Fleet Street	

=== 2010s ===
Year	Film	Ref.
**2010** **(15th)**	**Let the Right One In**	
**2010** **(15th)**	Drag Me to Hell	
**2010** **(15th)**	Paranormal Activity	
**2010** **(15th)**	Thirst	
**2010** **(15th)**	Zombieland	
**2011** **(16th)**	**The Last Exorcism**	
**2011** **(16th)**	A Nightmare on Elm Street	
**2011** **(16th)**	Let Me In	
**2011** **(16th)**	Paranormal Activity 2	
**2011** **(16th)**	The Crazies	
**2012** **(17th)**	**Kill List**	
**2012** **(17th)**	Attack the Block	
**2012** **(17th)**	Insidious	
**2012** **(17th)**	Paranormal Activity 3	
**2012** **(17th)**	Trollhunter	
**2013** **(18th)**	**The Woman in Black**	
**2013** **(18th)**	Dark Shadows	
**2013** **(18th)**	Sightseers	
**2013** **(18th)**	Sinister	
**2013** **(18th)**	The Cabin in the Woods	
**2014** **(19th)**	**The Conjuring**	
**2014** **(19th)**	A Field in England	
**2014** **(19th)**	Evil Dead	
**2014** **(19th)**	World War Z	
**2014** **(19th)**	You're Next	
**2015** **(20th)**	**The Babadook**	
**2015** **(20th)**	Annabelle	
**2015** **(20th)**	Oculus	
**2015** **(20th)**	The Guest	
**2015** **(20th)**	Under the Skin	
**2016** **(21st)**	**The Hallow**	
**2016** **(21st)**	Crimson Peak	
**2016** **(21st)**	Insidious: Chapter 3	
**2016** **(21st)**	It Follows	
**2016** **(21st)**	Krampus	
**2017** **(22nd)**	**The Witch**	
**2017** **(22nd)**	Under the Shadow	
**2017** **(22nd)**	Green Room	
**2017** **(22nd)**	The Conjuring 2	
**2017** **(22nd)**	Don't Breathe	
**2018** **(23rd)**	**Get Out**	
**2018** **(23rd)**	mother!	
**2018** **(23rd)**	The Autopsy of Jane Doe	
**2018** **(23rd)**	It	
**2018** **(23rd)**	Split	
