= 15th Empire Awards =

2010 British film awards ceremony

- The logo for the 15th Empire Awards
- Date: 28 March 2010
- Site: Grosvenor House Hotel, London, England
- Hosted by: Dara Ó Briain

Highlights
- Best Film: Avatar
- Best British Film: Harry Brown
- Most awards: Avatar (3)
- Most nominations: Avatar and Inglourious Basterds (5)

The 15th Empire Awards ceremony (officially known as the Jameson Empire Awards), presented by the British film magazine Empire, honored the best films of 2009 and took place on 28 March 2010 at the Grosvenor House Hotel in London, England. During the ceremony, Empire presented Empire Awards in 11 categories as well as four honorary awards. The Done In 60 Seconds competition was opened for the first time to international entries from this year. Irish comedian Dara Ó Briain hosted the show for the second consecutive year. The awards were sponsored by Jameson Irish Whiskey for the second consecutive year.

In related events, Empire and Jameson Irish Whiskey held the 1st Done In 60 Seconds Competition Global Final on 26 March 2010 at 24 Club, London, England. The team of judges consisted of Empire editor-in-chief Mark Dinning, English actor Jason Isaacs and English film director and television director Edgar Wright, which selected from a shortlist of 20 nominees the five Done In 60 Seconds Award finalists that were invited to the Empire Awards where the winner was announced.

Avatar won the most awards with three including Best Film and Best Director for James Cameron. Other winners included Harry Brown, In the Loop, Inglourious Basterds, Let the Right One In, Nowhere Boy, Sherlock Holmes and Star Trek with one. Jude Law received the Empire Hero Award, Ian McKellen received the Empire Icon Award, Andy Serkis received the Empire Inspiration Award and Ray Winstone received the Outstanding Contribution to British Film award. Mark Wong from the United Kingdom won the Done In 60 Seconds Award for his 60-second film version of Top Gun.

Empire employee Kat Brown pioneered photolurking in the background of a picture with Rupert Grint.

== Winners and nominees ==
Winners are listed first and highlighted in boldface.

**Best Film**: **Avatar**; District 9; Inglourious Basterds; Star Trek; The Hurt Locker	**Best British Film**: **Harry Brown**; An Education; In the Loop; Nowhere Boy; The Imaginarium of Doctor Parnassus
**Best Director**: **James Cameron — Avatar**; J. J. Abrams — Star Trek; Kathryn Bigelow — The Hurt Locker; Neill Blomkamp — District 9; Quentin Tarantino — Inglourious Basterds	
**Best Actor**: **Christoph Waltz — Inglourious Basterds**; Michael Caine — Harry Brown; Robert Downey Jr. — Sherlock Holmes; Robert Pattinson — The Twilight Saga: New Moon; Sam Worthington — Avatar	**Best Actress**: **Zoe Saldaña — Avatar**; Anne-Marie Duff — Nowhere Boy; Carey Mulligan — An Education; Emily Blunt — The Young Victoria; Mélanie Laurent — Inglourious Basterds
**Best Comedy**: **In the Loop**; A Serious Man; The Hangover; The Men Who Stare at Goats; Up in the Air	**Best Horror**: **Let the Right One In**; Drag Me to Hell; Paranormal Activity; Thirst; Zombieland
**Best Sci-Fi/Fantasy**: **Star Trek**; Avatar; District 9; Moon; The Imaginarium of Doctor Parnassus	**Best Thriller**: **Sherlock Holmes**; Harry Brown; Inglourious Basterds; Public Enemies; The Hurt Locker
**Best Newcomer**: **Aaron Taylor-Johnson — Nowhere Boy**; Anna Kendrick — The Twilight Saga: New Moon and Up in the Air; Carey Mulligan — An Education; Katie Jarvis — Fish Tank; Sharlto Copley — District 9	**Done In 60 Seconds Award**: **United Kingdom: Top Gun by Mark Wong & Christopher Slaughter** (Note: Done In 60 Seconds: Top Gun by Mark Wong on YouTube); Finalists: (Note: The official website for the 15th Empire Awards only lists the United Kingdom nominees and finalists and not the global finalist list. The global finalist list was taken from an independent source.): Ireland: There Will Be Less Blood (There Will Be Blood) by Tom Rowley (Note: Done In 60 Seconds: There Will Be Blood by Tom Rowley on YouTube); Russia: True Lies by Andrew Akulina (Note: Done In 60 Seconds: True Lies by Andrew Akulina on YouTube); United Kingdom: The Evil Dead by Lee Hardcastle (Note: Done In 60 Seconds: The Evil Dead by Lee Hardcastle on YouTube); United Kingdom: Who Framed Roger Rabbit by Michael Whaite (Note: Done In 60 Seconds: Who Framed Roger Rabbit by Michael Whaite on YouTube)
**Honorary Awards**: Empire Hero Award: **Jude Law**; Empire Icon Award: **Ian McKellen**; Empire Inspiration Award: **Andy Serkis**; Outstanding Contribution to British Film: **Ray Winstone**	

=== Multiple awards ===
The following film received multiple awards:

Awards	Film
3	Avatar

=== Multiple nominations ===
The following 13 films received multiple nominations:

Nominations	Film
5	Avatar
5	Inglourious Basterds
4	District 9
3	An Education
3	Harry Brown
3	Nowhere Boy
3	Star Trek
3	The Hurt Locker
2	In the Loop
2	Sherlock Holmes
2	The Imaginarium of Doctor Parnassus
2	The Twilight Saga: New Moon
2	Up in the Air
