= Empire Award for Best British Actress =

Former annual British film award

Empire Award for British Best Actress
- Awarded for: Best performance by a British actress in a leading role
- Country: United Kingdom
- Presented by: Empire magazine
- First award: 1996
- Final award: 2005
- Currently held by: Kate Winslet - Eternal Sunshine of the Spotless Mind (2005)

The Empire Award for Best British Actress was an Empire Award presented annually by the British film magazine Empire to honor a British actress who has delivered an outstanding performance in a leading role, while working within the film industry. The Empire Award for Best British Actress was first introduced at the 1st Empire Awards ceremony in 1996, with Kate Winslet receiving the award for her role in Heavenly Creatures, and last presented at the 10th Empire Awards ceremony in 2005. It was one of three Best British awards retired that year (the others being Best British Actor and Best British Director). Winners were voted by the readers of Empire magazine.

Since its inception, the award has been given to six actress. Kate Winslet had received the most awards in this category, with five awards, and was nominated on six occasions, more than any other actress. Winslet was the last winner in this category, for her role in Eternal Sunshine of the Spotless Mind.

== Winners and nominees ==
In the list below, winners are listed first in bold, followed by the other nominees. The number of the ceremony (1st, 2nd, etc.) appears in parentheses after the awards year, linked to the article (if any) on that ceremony.

=== 1990s ===
Year	Actress	Film	Ref.
**1996** **(1st)**	**Kate Winslet**	**Heavenly Creatures**	
**1997** **(2nd)**	**Brenda Blethyn**	**Secrets & Lies**	
**1998** **(3rd)**	**Kate Winslet**	**Hamlet**	
**1999** **(4th)**	**Kate Winslet**	**Titanic**	
**1999** **(4th)**	Anna Friel	The Land Girls	
**1999** **(4th)**	Catherine Zeta-Jones	The Mask of Zorro	
**1999** **(4th)**	Emily Watson	The Boxer	
**1999** **(4th)**	Minnie Driver	Good Will Hunting	

=== 2000s ===
Year	Actress	Film	Ref.
**2000** **(5th)**	**Helena Bonham Carter**	**Fight Club**	
**2000** **(5th)**	Brenda Blethyn	Little Voice	
**2000** **(5th)**	Kate Winslet	Hideous Kinky	
**2000** **(5th)**	Minnie Driver	An Ideal Husband	
**2000** **(5th)**	Olivia Williams	Rushmore, and The Sixth Sense	
**2001** **(6th)**	**Julie Walters**	**Billy Elliot**	
**2001** **(6th)**	Brenda Blethyn	Saving Grace	
**2001** **(6th)**	Kathy Burke	Kevin & Perry Go Large	
**2001** **(6th)**	Samantha Morton	Sweet and Lowdown	
**2001** **(6th)**	Thandie Newton	Mission: Impossible 2	
**2002** **(7th)**	**Kate Winslet**	**Enigma**	
**2002** **(7th)**	Catherine Zeta-Jones	Traffic	
**2002** **(7th)**	Helena Bonham Carter	Planet of the Apes	
**2002** **(7th)**	Olivia Williams	Lucky Break	
**2002** **(7th)**	Rachel Weisz	The Mummy Returns	
**2003** **(8th)**	**Samantha Morton**	**Minority Report**	
**2003** **(8th)**	Emily Watson	Red Dragon	
**2003** **(8th)**	Helen Mirren	Gosford Park	
**2003** **(8th)**	Keira Knightley	Bend It Like Beckham	
**2003** **(8th)**	Kelly Macdonald	Gosford Park	
**2004** **(9th)**	**Emma Thompson**	**Love Actually**	
**2004** **(9th)**	Emily Mortimer	Young Adam	
**2004** **(9th)**	Helen Mirren	Calendar Girls	
**2004** **(9th)**	Julie Walters	Calendar Girls	
**2004** **(9th)**	Keira Knightley	Pirates of the Caribbean: The Curse of the Black Pearl	
**2005** **(10th)**	**Kate Winslet**	**Eternal Sunshine of the Spotless Mind**	
**2005** **(10th)**	Imelda Staunton	Vera Drake	
**2005** **(10th)**	Kate Ashfield	Shaun of the Dead	
**2005** **(10th)**	Keira Knightley	King Arthur	
**2005** **(10th)**	Samantha Morton	Enduring Love	

== Multiple awards and nominations ==
=== Multiple awards ===
The following individual received two or more Best British Actress awards:

Awards	Film
5	Kate Winslet

=== Multiple nominations ===
The following individuals received two or more Best British Actress nominations:

Nominations	Film
6	Kate Winslet
3	Brenda Blethyn
3	Keira Knightley
3	Samantha Morton
2	Catherine Zeta-Jones
2	Emily Watson
2	Helen Mirren
2	Helena Bonham Carter
2	Julie Walters
2	Minnie Driver
2	Olivia Williams
