= Empire Award for Best Female Newcomer =

Former annual British film award

- Awarded for: Best breakthrough performance by an actress
- Country: United Kingdom
- Presented by: Empire magazine
- First award: 2012
- Currently held by: Dafne Keen – Logan (2018)

The Empire Award for Best Female Newcomer was an Empire Award presented annually by the British film magazine Empire to honour an actress who has delivered a breakthrough performance while working within the film industry. The Empire Award for Best Female Newcomer is one of two ongoing awards which were first introduced at the 17th Empire Awards ceremony in 2012 (along with Best Male Newcomer) with Felicity Jones receiving the award for her role in Like Crazy. Dafne Keen is the most recent winner in this category for her role in Logan. Winners are voted by the readers of Empire magazine.

== Winners and nominees ==
In the list below, winners are listed first in boldface, followed by the other nominees. The number of the ceremony (1st, 2nd, etc.) appears in parentheses after the awards year, linked to the article (if any) on that ceremony.

=== 2010s ===
Year	Actor	Film	Ref.
**2012** **(17th)**	**Felicity Jones**	**Like Crazy**	
**2012** **(17th)**	Bonnie Wright	Harry Potter and the Deathly Hallows – Part 2	
**2012** **(17th)**	Céline Buckens	War Horse	
**2012** **(17th)**	Elle Fanning	Super 8	
**2012** **(17th)**	Hailee Steinfeld	True Grit	
**2012** **(17th)**	Laura Haddock	The Inbetweeners Movie	
**2013** **(18th)**	**Samantha Barks**	**Les Misérables**	
**2013** **(18th)**	Alice Lowe	Sightseers	
**2013** **(18th)**	Alicia Vikander	Anna Karenina	
**2013** **(18th)**	Holliday Grainger	Great Expectations	
**2013** **(18th)**	Quvenzhané Wallis	Beasts of the Southern Wild	
**2014** **(19th)**	**Margot Robbie**	**The Wolf of Wall Street**	
**2014** **(19th)**	Adèle Exarchopoulos	Blue Is the Warmest Colour	
**2014** **(19th)**	Antonia Thomas	Sunshine on Leith	
**2014** **(19th)**	Elizabeth Debicki	The Great Gatsby	
**2014** **(19th)**	Freya Mavor	Sunshine on Leith	
**2014** **(19th)**	Lupita Nyong'o	12 Years a Slave	
**2015** **(20th)**	**Karen Gillan**	**Oculus** and **Guardians of the Galaxy**	
**2015** **(20th)**	Carrie Coon	Gone Girl	
**2015** **(20th)**	Essie Davis	The Babadook	
**2015** **(20th)**	Gugu Mbatha-Raw	Belle	
**2015** **(20th)**	Sophie Cookson	Kingsman: The Secret Service	
**2016** **(21st)**	**Daisy Ridley**	**Star Wars: The Force Awakens**	
**2016** **(21st)**	Olivia Cooke	Me and Earl and the Dying Girl	
**2016** **(21st)**	Rebecca Ferguson	Mission: Impossible – Rogue Nation	
**2016** **(21st)**	Maika Monroe	It Follows	
**2016** **(21st)**	Bel Powley	The Diary of a Teenage Girl	
**2017** **(22nd)**	**Anya Taylor-Joy**	**The Witch**	
**2017** **(22nd)**	Sennia Nanua	The Girl with All the Gifts	
**2017** **(22nd)**	Sasha Lane	American Honey	
**2017** **(22nd)**	Hayley Squires	I, Daniel Blake	
**2017** **(22nd)**	Angourie Rice	The Nice Guys	
**2018** **(23rd)**	**Dafne Keen**	**Logan**	
**2018** **(23rd)**	Emily Beecham	Daphne	
**2018** **(23rd)**	Florence Pugh	Lady Macbeth	
**2018** **(23rd)**	Tessa Thompson	Thor: Ragnarok	
**2018** **(23rd)**	Kelly Marie Tran	Star Wars: The Last Jedi	
