= 16th Empire Awards =

2011 British film awards ceremony

- The logo for the 16th Empire Awards
- Date: 27 March 2011
- Site: Grosvenor House Hotel, London, England
- Hosted by: Dara Ó Briain

Highlights
- Best Film: Inception
- Best British Film: Kick-Ass
- Most awards: Kick-Ass and The Girl with the Dragon Tattoo (2)
- Most nominations: Kick-Ass (6)

The 16th Empire Awards ceremony (officially known as the Jameson Empire Awards), presented by the British film magazine Empire, honored the best films of 2010 and took place on 27 March 2011 at the Grosvenor House Hotel in London, England. During the ceremony, Empire presented Empire Awards in 11 categories as well as three honorary awards. Irish comedian Dara Ó Briain hosted the show for the third consecutive year. The awards were sponsored by Jameson Irish Whiskey for the third consecutive year.

In related events, Empire and Jameson Irish Whiskey held the 2nd Done In 60 Seconds Competition Global Final on 25 March 2011 at the London Film Museum, London, England. The team of judges consisted of Empire editor-in-chief Mark Dinning, Irish actor and comedian Chris O'Dowd and English director Neil Marshall, which selected from a shortlist of 24 nominees the five Done In 60 Seconds Award finalists that were invited to the Empire Awards where the winner was announced.

Kick-Ass won two awards including Best British Film. Other winners included The Girl with the Dragon Tattoo also with two awards and Four Lions, Harry Potter and the Deathly Hallows – Part 1, Inception, Let Me In, Scott Pilgrim vs. the World, The King's Speech and The Last Exorcism with one. Keira Knightley received the Empire Hero Award, Gary Oldman received the Empire Icon Award and Edgar Wright received the Empire Inspiration Award. Maeve Stam from the Netherlands won the Done In 60 Seconds Award for her 60-second film version of 127 Hours.

== Winners and nominees ==
Winners are listed first and highlighted in boldface.

**Best Film**: **Inception**; Kick-Ass; Scott Pilgrim vs. the World; The King's Speech; The Social Network	**Best British Film**: **Kick-Ass**; 127 Hours; Four Lions; Monsters; The King's Speech
**Best Director**: **Edgar Wright — Scott Pilgrim vs. the World**; Christopher Nolan — Inception; David Fincher — The Social Network; Matthew Vaughn — Kick-Ass; Tom Hooper — The King's Speech	
**Best Actor**: **Colin Firth — The King's Speech**; Aaron Taylor-Johnson — Kick-Ass; James Franco — 127 Hours; Jesse Eisenberg — The Social Network; Leonardo DiCaprio — Inception	**Best Actress**: **Noomi Rapace — The Girl with the Dragon Tattoo**; Emma Watson — Harry Potter and the Deathly Hallows – Part 1; Helena Bonham Carter — The King's Speech; Natalie Portman — Black Swan; Olivia Williams — The Ghost Writer
**Best Comedy**: **Four Lions**; Easy A; Get Him to the Greek; The Other Guys; Toy Story 3	**Best Horror**: **The Last Exorcism**; A Nightmare on Elm Street; Let Me In; Paranormal Activity 2; The Crazies
**Best Sci-Fi/Fantasy**: **Harry Potter and the Deathly Hallows – Part 1**; Alice in Wonderland; Inception; Kick-Ass; Scott Pilgrim vs. the World	**Best Thriller**: **The Girl with the Dragon Tattoo**; 127 Hours; Black Swan; Shutter Island; The Town
**Best Newcomer**: **Chloë Grace Moretz — Kick-Ass and Let Me In**; Gareth Edwards — Monsters; Jaden Smith — The Karate Kid; Jennifer Lawrence — Winter's Bone; Mia Wasikowska — Alice in Wonderland	**Done In 60 Seconds Award**: **Netherlands: 127 Hours by Maeve Stam** (Note: Done In 60 Seconds: 127 Hours by Maeve Stam on YouTube); Finalists: Russia: Avatar by Valentina Kurochkina & Sergey Potapov (Note: Done In 60 Seconds: Avatar by Valentina Kurochkina & Sergey Potapov on YouTube); Sweden: Indiana Jones (Raiders of the Lost Ark) by Samuel Heiligers, Frej Bengtsson & Stefan Lundaahl (Note: Done In 60 Seconds: Indiana Jones by Samuel Heiligers, Frej Bengtsson & Stefan Lundaahl on YouTube); United Kingdom: The Exorcist by Lee Hardcastle (Note: Done In 60 Seconds: The Exorcist by Lee Hardcastle on YouTube); United Kingdom: The Lion King by Michael Whaite (Note: Done In 60 Seconds: The Lion King by Michael Whaite on YouTube); The other shortlisted films: Bulgaria: Valkyrie by Marian Georgiev (Note: Done In 60 Seconds: Valkyrie by Marian Georgiev on YouTube); Chile: Aliens by Rodrigo Reyes Santander (Note: Done In 60 Seconds: Aliens by Rodrigo Reyes Santander on YouTube); Germany: Léon: The Professional by Negian Haddad Kaveh (Note: Done In 60 Seconds: Léon: The Professional by Negian Haddad Kaveh on YouTube); Ireland: The Expendables by Chris Lodge (Note: Done In 60 Seconds: The Expendables by Chris Lodge on YouTube); Ireland: Shadow of the Vampire by Kevin De La Isla (Note: Done In 60 Seconds: Shadow of the Vampire by Kevin De La Isla on YouTube); Kazakhstan: The Dark Knight by Andrey Manuilov (Note: Done In 60 Seconds: The Dark Knight by Andrey Manuilov on YouTube); Poland: James Bond by Michael Mank & Jacek Wlodarczyk (Note: Done In 60 Seconds: James Bond by Michael Mank & Jacek Wlodarczyk on YouTube); Russia: Inception by Petr Lisovisky & Artur Ostapenko (Note: Done In 60 Seconds: Inception by Petr Lisovisky & Artur Ostapenko on YouTube); Russia: Jaws by Dmitry Vasiyev & Zhanna Boyarintseva (Note: Done In 60 Seconds: Jaws by Dmitry Vasiyev & Zhanna Boyarintseva on YouTube); Russia: Transformers Grindhouse (Transformers) by Olga Busorgina & Andrey Kilin (Note: Done In 60 Seconds: Transformers Grindhouse by Olga Busorgina & Andrey Kilin on YouTube); Russia: Charlie Chaplin by Vadi Talanov & Dmitry Korobeynikov (Note: Done In 60 Seconds: Charlie Chaplin by Vadi Talanov & Dmitry Korobeynikov on YouTube); Sweden: Psycho by Joshua Petsonk & Hanni Serag (Note: Done In 60 Seconds: Psycho by Joshua Petsonk & Hanni Serag on YouTube); Turkey: Dr. Strangelove by Çagil Ivak (Note: Done In 60 Seconds: Dr. Strangelove by Çagil Ivak on YouTube); Turkey: 12 Angry Men by Esat Can (Note: Done In 60 Seconds: 12 Angry Men by Esat Can on YouTube); Ukraine: 2001: A Space Odyssey by Mykhailo Orlov (Note: Done In 60 Seconds: 2001: A Space Odyssey by Mykhailo Orlov on YouTube); Ukraine: Inglourious Basterds by Vladyslav Trifinov; United Kingdom: The Social Network by Jack Kendall (Note: Done In 60 Seconds: The Social Network by Jack Kendall on YouTube); United Kingdom: 300 by Simon Jago, Ryan Casey & Clark Brady (Note: Done In 60 Seconds: 300 by Simon Jago, Ryan Casey & Clark Brady on YouTube); United Kingdom: Predator by Gareth Soens Hughes (Note: Done In 60 Seconds: Predator by Gareth Soens Hughes on YouTube)
**Honorary Awards**: Empire Hero Award: **Keira Knightley**; Empire Icon Award: **Gary Oldman**; Empire Inspiration Award: **Edgar Wright**

=== Multiple awards ===
The following two films received multiple awards:

Awards	Film
2	Kick-Ass
2	The Girl with the Dragon Tattoo

=== Multiple nominations ===
The following 13 films received multiple nominations:

Nominations	Film
6	Kick-Ass
5	The King's Speech
4	Inception
3	127 Hours
3	Scott Pilgrim vs. the World
3	The Social Network
2	Alice in Wonderland
2	Black Swan
2	Four Lions
2	Harry Potter and the Deathly Hallows – Part 1
2	Let Me In
2	Monsters
2	The Girl with the Dragon Tattoo
