= Empire Award for Best Sci-Fi/Fantasy =

Former annual British film award

- Awarded for: Best sci-fi, fantasy or superhero film of the year
- Country: United Kingdom
- Presented by: Empire magazine
- First award: 2006
- Currently held by: Wonder Woman (2018)

The Empire Award for Best Sci-Fi/Fantasy was an Empire Award presented annually by the British film magazine Empire to honor the best sci-fi, fantasy or superhero film of the previous year. The Empire Award for Best Sci-Fi/Fantasy is one of four new Best Film ongoing awards which were first introduced at the 11th Empire Awards ceremony in 2006 (along with Best Comedy, Best Horror and Best Thriller) with Star Wars: Episode III – Revenge of the Sith receiving the award. A Monster Calls is the most recent winner in this category. Winners are voted by the readers of Empire magazine.

== Winners and nominees ==
In the list below, winners are listed first in boldface, followed by the other nominees. The number of the ceremony (1st, 2nd, etc.) appears in parentheses after the awards year, linked to the article (if any) on that ceremony.

=== 2000s ===
Year	Film	Ref.
**2006** **(11th)**	**Star Wars: Episode III – Revenge of the Sith**	
**2006** **(11th)**	Harry Potter and the Goblet of Fire	
**2006** **(11th)**	King Kong	
**2006** **(11th)**	Serenity	
**2006** **(11th)**	The Chronicles of Narnia: The Lion, the Witch and the Wardrobe	
**2007** **(12th)**	**Pan's Labyrinth**	
**2007** **(12th)**	Children of Men	
**2007** **(12th)**	Pirates of the Caribbean: Dead Man's Chest	
**2007** **(12th)**	Superman Returns	
**2007** **(12th)**	X-Men: The Last Stand	
**2008** **(13th)**	**Stardust**	
**2008** **(13th)**	300	
**2008** **(13th)**	Harry Potter and the Order of the Phoenix	
**2008** **(13th)**	Sunshine	
**2008** **(13th)**	Transformers	
**2009** **(14th)**	**Wanted**	(Note: The official name of the award at the 14th Empire Awards in 2009 was "Best Sci-Fi/Superhero".)
**2009** **(14th)**	Hellboy II: The Golden Army	(Note: The official name of the award at the 14th Empire Awards in 2009 was "Best Sci-Fi/Superhero".)
**2009** **(14th)**	Iron Man	(Note: The official name of the award at the 14th Empire Awards in 2009 was "Best Sci-Fi/Superhero".)
**2009** **(14th)**	The Dark Knight	(Note: The official name of the award at the 14th Empire Awards in 2009 was "Best Sci-Fi/Superhero".)
**2009** **(14th)**	WALL-E	(Note: The official name of the award at the 14th Empire Awards in 2009 was "Best Sci-Fi/Superhero".)

=== 2010s ===
Year	Film	Ref.
**2010** **(15th)**	**Star Trek**	
**2010** **(15th)**	Avatar	
**2010** **(15th)**	District 9	
**2010** **(15th)**	Moon	
**2010** **(15th)**	The Imaginarium of Doctor Parnassus	
**2011** **(16th)**	**Harry Potter and the Deathly Hallows – Part 1**	
**2011** **(16th)**	Alice in Wonderland	
**2011** **(16th)**	Inception	
**2011** **(16th)**	Kick-Ass	
**2011** **(16th)**	Scott Pilgrim vs. the World	
**2012** **(17th)**	**Thor**	
**2012** **(17th)**	Captain America: The First Avenger	
**2012** **(17th)**	Rise of the Planet of the Apes	
**2012** **(17th)**	Super 8	
**2012** **(17th)**	X-Men: First Class	
**2013** **(18th)**	**The Hobbit: An Unexpected Journey**	
**2013** **(18th)**	Dredd	
**2013** **(18th)**	Looper	
**2013** **(18th)**	Prometheus	
**2013** **(18th)**	The Avengers	
**2014** **(19th)**	**The Hobbit: The Desolation of Smaug**	
**2014** **(19th)**	Gravity	
**2014** **(19th)**	Pacific Rim	
**2014** **(19th)**	Star Trek Into Darkness	
**2014** **(19th)**	The Hunger Games: Catching Fire	
**2015** **(20th)**	**X-Men: Days of Future Past**	
**2015** **(20th)**	Dawn of the Planet of the Apes	
**2015** **(20th)**	Guardians of the Galaxy	
**2015** **(20th)**	Interstellar	
**2015** **(20th)**	The Hobbit: The Battle of the Five Armies	
**2016** **(21st)**	**Star Wars: The Force Awakens**	
**2016** **(21st)**	The Hunger Games: Mockingjay – Part 2	
**2016** **(21st)**	Jurassic World	
**2016** **(21st)**	Mad Max: Fury Road	
**2016** **(21st)**	The Martian	
**2017** **(22nd)**	**A Monster Calls**	
**2017** **(22nd)**	Arrival	
**2017** **(22nd)**	Doctor Strange	
**2017** **(22nd)**	Rogue One	
**2017** **(22nd)**	10 Cloverfield Lane	
**2018** **(23rd)**	**Wonder Woman**	
**2018** **(23rd)**	Blade Runner 2049	
**2018** **(23rd)**	Logan	
**2018** **(23rd)**	Star Wars: The Last Jedi	
**2018** **(23rd)**	Thor: Ragnarok	
