= Empire Hero Award =

European film award

The Empire Hero Award is an honorary Empire Award presented by the British film magazine Empire. The Empire Hero Award was first introduced at the 15th Empire Awards ceremony in 2010 with Jude Law receiving the award. Actor Tom Hiddleston is the most recent winner in this category. Empire now presents three honorary awards: Empire Hero Award, Empire Inspiration Award and Empire Legend Award.

== Winners ==
In the list below, winners are listed first in boldface. The number of the ceremony (1st, 2nd, etc.) appears in parentheses after the awards year, linked to the article (if any) on that ceremony.

=== 2010s ===
Year	Winner	Ref.
**2010** **(15th)**	Jude Law	
**2011** **(16th)**	Keira Knightley	
**2012** **(17th)**	Michael Fassbender	
**2013** **(18th)**	Daniel Radcliffe	
**2014** **(19th)**	Simon Pegg	
**2015** **(20th)**	The cast of Game of Thrones	
**2016** **(21st)**	Stanley Tucci	
**2017** **(22nd)**	Tom Hiddleston	
