= Empire Award for Best Comedy =

Former annual British film award

- Awarded for: Best comedy film of the year
- Country: United Kingdom
- Presented by: Empire magazine
- First award: 2006
- Currently held by: The Death of Stalin (2018)

The Empire Award for Best Comedy is an Empire Award presented annually by the British film magazine Empire to honour the best comedy film of the previous year. The Empire Award for Best Comedy is one of four new Best Film ongoing awards which were first introduced at the 11th Empire Awards ceremony in 2006 (along with Best Horror, Best Sci-Fi/Fantasy and Best Thriller) with Team America: World Police receiving the award. The Death of Stalin is the most recent winner in this category. Winners are voted by the readers of Empire magazine.

== Winners and nominees ==
In the list below, winners are listed first in boldface, followed by the other nominees. The number of the ceremony (1st, 2nd, etc.) appears in parentheses after the awards year, linked to the article (if any) on that ceremony.

=== 2000s ===
Year	Film	Ref.
**2006** **(11th)**	**Team America: World Police**	
**2006** **(11th)**	The Hitchhiker's Guide to the Galaxy	
**2006** **(11th)**	The League of Gentlemen's Apocalypse	
**2006** **(11th)**	Wallace & Gromit: The Curse of the Were-Rabbit	
**2006** **(11th)**	Wedding Crashers	
**2007** **(12th)**	**Little Miss Sunshine**	
**2007** **(12th)**	A Cock and Bull Story	
**2007** **(12th)**	Borat	
**2007** **(12th)**	Clerks II	
**2007** **(12th)**	Nacho Libre	
**2008** **(13th)**	**Hot Fuzz**	
**2008** **(13th)**	Knocked Up	
**2008** **(13th)**	Ratatouille	
**2008** **(13th)**	Run Fatboy Run	
**2008** **(13th)**	Superbad	
**2009** **(14th)**	**Son of Rambow**	
**2009** **(14th)**	Burn After Reading	
**2009** **(14th)**	Ghost Town	
**2009** **(14th)**	In Bruges	
**2009** **(14th)**	Tropic Thunder	

=== 2010s ===
Year	Film	Ref.
**2010** **(15th)**	**In the Loop**	
**2010** **(15th)**	A Serious Man	
**2010** **(15th)**	The Hangover	
**2010** **(15th)**	The Men Who Stare at Goats	
**2010** **(15th)**	Up in the Air	
**2011** **(16th)**	**Four Lions**	
**2011** **(16th)**	Easy A	
**2011** **(16th)**	Get Him to the Greek	
**2011** **(16th)**	The Other Guys	
**2011** **(16th)**	Toy Story 3	
**2012** **(17th)**	**The Inbetweeners Movie**	
**2012** **(17th)**	Attack the Block	
**2012** **(17th)**	Bridesmaids	
**2012** **(17th)**	Crazy, Stupid, Love	
**2012** **(17th)**	Midnight in Paris	
**2013** **(18th)**	**Ted**	
**2013** **(18th)**	21 Jump Street	
**2013** **(18th)**	Moonrise Kingdom	
**2013** **(18th)**	Silver Linings Playbook	
**2013** **(18th)**	The Pirates! In an Adventure with Scientists!	
**2014** **(19th)**	**Alan Partridge: Alpha Papa**	
**2014** **(19th)**	Anchorman 2: The Legend Continues	
**2014** **(19th)**	The World's End	
**2014** **(19th)**	This Is 40	
**2014** **(19th)**	This Is the End	
**2015** **(20th)**	**Paddington**	
**2015** **(20th)**	22 Jump Street	
**2015** **(20th)**	The Grand Budapest Hotel	
**2015** **(20th)**	The Inbetweeners 2	
**2015** **(20th)**	The Lego Movie	
**2016** **(21st)**	**Spy**	
**2016** **(21st)**	Ant-Man	
**2016** **(21st)**	Me and Earl and the Dying Girl	
**2016** **(21st)**	Trainwreck	
**2016** **(21st)**	Inside Out	
**2017** **(22nd)**	**The Greasy Strangler**	
**2017** **(22nd)**	Deadpool	
**2017** **(22nd)**	The Nice Guys	
**2017** **(22nd)**	Hunt for the Wilderpeople	
**2017** **(22nd)**	Ghostbusters	
**2018** **(23rd)**	**The Death of Stalin**	
**2018** **(23rd)**	Toni Erdmann	
**2018** **(23rd)**	The Big Sick	
**2018** **(23rd)**	The Disaster Artist	
**2018** **(23rd)**	Girls Trip	

Last awarded was at 18 March 2018.
