= Empire Award for Best Male Newcomer =

Former annual British film award

- Awarded for: Best breakthrough performance by an actor
- Country: United Kingdom
- Presented by: Empire magazine
- First award: 2012
- Currently held by: Josh O'Connor - God's Own Country (2018)

The Empire Award for Best Male Newcomer is an Empire Award presented annually by the British film magazine Empire to honor an actor who has delivered a breakthrough performance while working within the film industry. The Empire Award for Best Male Newcomer is one of two ongoing awards which were first introduced at the 17th Empire Awards ceremony in 2012 (along with Best Female Newcomer) with Tom Hiddleston receiving the award for his role in Thor. Josh O'Connor is the most recent winner in this category for his role in God's Own Country. Winners are voted by the readers of Empire magazine.

== Winners and nominees ==
In the list below, winners are listed first in boldface, followed by the other nominees. The number of the ceremony (1st, 2nd, etc.) appears in parentheses after the awards year, linked to the article (if any) on that ceremony.

=== 2010s ===
Year	Actor	Film	Ref.
**2012** **(17th)**	**Tom Hiddleston**	**Thor**	
**2012** **(17th)**	Asa Butterfield	Hugo	
**2012** **(17th)**	Craig Roberts	Submarine	
**2012** **(17th)**	Jeremy Irvine	War Horse	
**2012** **(17th)**	John Boyega	Attack the Block	
**2012** **(17th)**	Sam Claflin	Pirates of the Caribbean: On Stranger Tides	
**2013** **(18th)**	**Tom Holland**	**The Impossible**	
**2013** **(18th)**	Domhnall Gleeson	Anna Karenina	
**2013** **(18th)**	Rafe Spall	Life of Pi	
**2013** **(18th)**	Steve Oram	Sightseers	
**2013** **(18th)**	Suraj Sharma	Life of Pi	
**2014** **(19th)**	**Aidan Turner**	**The Hobbit: The Desolation of Smaug**	
**2014** **(19th)**	Barkhad Abdi	Captain Phillips	
**2014** **(19th)**	George MacKay	Sunshine on Leith	
**2014** **(19th)**	Oscar Isaac	Inside Llewyn Davis	
**2014** **(19th)**	Tye Sheridan	Mud	
**2014** **(19th)**	Will Poulter	We're the Millers	
**2015** **(20th)**	**Taron Egerton**	**Kingsman: The Secret Service**	
**2015** **(20th)**	Dan Stevens	The Guest	
**2015** **(20th)**	Daniel Huttlestone	Into the Woods	
**2015** **(20th)**	Ellar Coltrane	Boyhood	
**2015** **(20th)**	Jack O'Connell	Unbroken	
**2016** **(21st)**	**John Boyega**	**Star Wars: The Force Awakens**	
**2016** **(21st)**	Abraham Attah	Beasts of No Nation	
**2016** **(21st)**	Thomas Mann	Me and Earl and the Dying Girl	
**2016** **(21st)**	Jason Mitchell	Straight Outta Compton	
**2016** **(21st)**	Jacob Tremblay	Room	
**2017** **(22nd)**	**Dave Johns**	**I, Daniel Blake**	
**2017** **(22nd)**	Julian Dennison	Hunt for the Wilderpeople	
**2017** **(22nd)**	Lewis MacDougall	A Monster Calls	
**2017** **(22nd)**	Riz Ahmed	Rogue One: A Star Wars Story	
**2017** **(22nd)**	Tom Holland	Captain America: Civil War	
**2018** **(23rd)**	**Josh O'Connor**	**God's Own Country**	
**2018** **(23rd)**	Fionn Whitehead	Dunkirk	
**2018** **(23rd)**	Ansel Elgort	Baby Driver	
**2018** **(23rd)**	Daniel Kaluuya	Get Out	
**2018** **(23rd)**	Timothée Chalamet	Call Me by Your Name	
