= 14th Empire Awards =

2009 British film awards ceremony

- The logo for the 14th Empire Awards
- Date: 29 March 2009
- Site: Grosvenor House Hotel, London, England
- Hosted by: Dara Ó Briain

Highlights
- Best Film: The Dark Knight
- Best British Film: RocknRolla
- Most awards: The Dark Knight (3)
- Most nominations: Sweeney Todd: The Demon Barber of Fleet Street (5)

The 14th Empire Awards ceremony (officially known as the Jameson Empire Awards), presented by the British film magazine Empire, honored the best films of 2008 and took place on 29 March 2009 at the Grosvenor House Hotel in London, England. During the ceremony, Empire presented Empire Awards in 12 categories as well as four honorary awards. To celebrate the 20th anniversary of Empire magazine a special honorary award was presented, the Actor of our Lifetime and to mark the loss of Heath Ledger, he was awarded the special honorary Heath Ledger Tribute Award. The Sony Ericsson Soundtrack Award was renamed to "Best Soundtrack" and the Best Sci-Fi/Fantasy award was renamed this year only to "Best Sci-Fi/Superhero". The Best Newcomer and Best Soundtrack awards were presented for the last time. Irish comedian Dara Ó Briain hosted the show for the first time. The awards were sponsored by Jameson Irish Whiskey for the first time.

The Dark Knight won the most awards with three including Best Film and Best Director for Christopher Nolan. Other winners included Eden Lake, Mamma Mia!, Quantum of Solace, RocknRolla, Son of Rambow, Sweeney Todd: The Demon Barber of Fleet Street and Wanted with one. Viggo Mortensen received the Empire Icon Award, Danny Boyle received the Outstanding Contribution to British Film award, Russell Crowe received the Actor of our Lifetime award and Heath Ledger received a special post-mortem tribute. Stephen Power and Conal O'Meara from the United Kingdom won the Done In 60 Seconds Award for their 60-second film version of Jerry Maguire.

== Winners and nominees ==
Winners are listed first and highlighted in boldface. The shortlisted nominees were revealed on 2 March 2009 and finale voting ended on 12 March 2009.

**Best Film**: **The Dark Knight**; Iron Man; No Country for Old Men; There Will Be Blood; WALL-E	**Best British Film**: **RocknRolla**; Eden Lake; Hunger; In Bruges; Son of Rambow
**Best Director**: **Christopher Nolan — The Dark Knight**; Andrew Stanton — WALL-E; Joel and Ethan Coen — No Country for Old Men; Paul Thomas Anderson — There Will Be Blood; Tim Burton — Sweeney Todd: The Demon Barber of Fleet Street	
**Best Actor**: **Christian Bale — The Dark Knight**; Daniel Craig — Quantum of Solace; Daniel Day-Lewis — There Will Be Blood; Johnny Depp — Sweeney Todd: The Demon Barber of Fleet Street; Robert Downey Jr. — Iron Man	**Best Actress**: **Helena Bonham Carter — Sweeney Todd: The Demon Barber of Fleet Street**; Angelina Jolie — Changeling; Elliot Page (Note: Credited as Ellen Page; Juno was released before Page came out as transgender.) — Juno; Olga Kurylenko — Quantum of Solace; Sally Hawkins — Happy-Go-Lucky
**Best Comedy**: **Son of Rambow**; Burn After Reading; Ghost Town; In Bruges; Tropic Thunder	**Best Horror**: **Eden Lake**; The Mist; The Orphanage; The Strangers; Sweeney Todd: The Demon Barber of Fleet Street
**Best Sci-Fi/Superhero**: **Wanted**; Hellboy II: The Golden Army; Iron Man; The Dark Knight; WALL-E	**Best Thriller**: **Quantum of Solace**; Changeling; Eagle Eye; Gone Baby Gone; No Country for Old Men
**Best Newcomer**: **Gemma Arterton**; Hayley Atwell; Jim Sturgess; Robert Pattinson; Toby Kebbell	**Best Soundtrack**: **Mamma Mia!**; Quantum of Solace; RocknRolla; Sweeney Todd: The Demon Barber of Fleet Street; There Will Be Blood
**Done In 60 Seconds Award**: **United Kingdom: Jerry Maguire by Stephen Power & Conal O'Meara** (Note: Done In 60 Seconds: Jerry Maguire by Stephen Power & Conal O'Meara on YouTube); Finalists: United Kingdom: Cloverfield by Ewan Smith (Note: Done In 60 Seconds: Cloverfield by Ewan Smith on YouTube); United Kingdom: Pearl Harbor by Mark Wong (Note: Done In 60 Seconds: Pearl Harbor by Mark Wong on YouTube); United Kingdom: Se7en by Ewan Warburton (Note: Done In 60 Seconds: Se7en by Ewan Warburton on YouTube); United Kingdom: The Dark Knight by Steven Seller (Note: Done In 60 Seconds: The Dark Knight by Steven Seller on YouTube); The other shortlisted films: United Kingdom: American Psycho by Mike Doxford (Note: Done In 60 Seconds: American Psycho by Mike Doxford on YouTube); United Kingdom: Forrest Gump by Unknown director; United Kingdom: Requiem for a Dream by Charlie Lyne (Note: Done In 60 Seconds: Requiem for a Dream by Charlie Lyne on YouTube); United Kingdom: Reservoir Dogs by Harry Lindley (Note: Done In 60 Seconds: Reservoir Dogs by Harry Lindley on YouTube); United Kingdom: Terminator 2: Judgment Minute (Terminator 2: Judgment Day) by Katie Child; United Kingdom: The Fugitive by Martin Selby & Tom Marshall (Note: Done In 60 Seconds: The Fugitive by Martin Selby & Tom Marshall on YouTube); United Kingdom: WALL-E by Melanie Keyzor (Note: Done In 60 Seconds: WALL-E by Melanie Keyzor on YouTube)	**Honorary Awards**: Empire Icon Award: **Viggo Mortensen**; Outstanding Contribution to British Film: **Danny Boyle**; Actor of our Lifetime: **Russell Crowe**; Heath Ledger Tribute: **A special tribute award was dedicated to acknowledge the outstanding work of Heath Ledger.**

=== Multiple awards ===
The following film received multiple awards:

Awards	Film
3	The Dark Knight

=== Multiple nominations ===
The following 12 films received multiple nominations:

Nominations	Film
5	Sweeney Todd: The Demon Barber of Fleet Street
4	Quantum of Solace
4	The Dark Knight
4	There Will Be Blood
3	Iron Man
3	No Country for Old Men
3	WALL-E
2	Changeling
2	Eden Lake
2	In Bruges
2	RocknRolla
2	Son of Rambow
