= 10th Empire Awards =

2005 British film awards ceremony

- The logo for the 10th Empire Awards
- Date: 13 March 2005
- Site: Guildhall, London, England
- Hosted by: Johnny Vaughan

Highlights
- Best Film: The Bourne Supremacy
- Best British Film: Shaun of the Dead
- Most awards: The Bourne Supremacy (2)
- Most nominations: Enduring Love, Layer Cake, Shaun of the Dead and Spider-Man 2 (5)

Television coverage
- Channel: Channel 5

The 10th Empire Awards ceremony (officially known as the Sony Ericsson Empire Awards), presented by the British film magazine Empire, honored the best films of 2004 and took place on 13 March 2005 at the Guildhall in London, England. During the ceremony, Empire presented Empire Awards in 10 categories as well as four honorary awards. The honorary Outstanding Contribution to British Cinema award was first introduced this year. To celebrate the 10th anniversary of the award ceremonies a special honorary award was presented, the Icon of the Decade award. The awards for Best British Actor, Best British Actress and Best British Director as well as the honorary Independent Spirit award were presented for the last time. This was the first year the Lifetime Achievement Award was not presented. The ceremony was televised in the United Kingdom by Channel 5 on 15 March. English television presenter and radio presenter Johnny Vaughan hosted the show for the first time. The awards were sponsored by Sony Ericsson for the third consecutive year.

The Bourne Supremacy won the most awards with two including Best Film. Other winners included Before Sunset, Dead Man's Shoes, Enduring Love, Eternal Sunshine of the Spotless Mind, Finding Neverland, Layer Cake, Spider-Man 2 and Shaun of the Dead with one. Pixar received the Empire Inspiration Award, Kevin Smith received the Independent Spirit Award, Working Title Films received the Outstanding Contribution to British Cinema Award and Quentin Tarantino received the special honorary 10th anniversary Icon of the Decade award.

== Winners and nominees ==
Winners are listed first and highlighted in boldface.

**Best Film**: **The Bourne Supremacy**; Collateral; Kill Bill: Volume 2; Spider-Man 2; The Incredibles	**Best British Film**: **Shaun of the Dead**; Bridget Jones: The Edge of Reason; Dead Man's Shoes; Enduring Love; Layer Cake
**Best Director**: **Sam Raimi — Spider-Man 2**; M. Night Shyamalan — The Village; Michael Mann — Collateral; Michel Gondry — Eternal Sunshine of the Spotless Mind; Quentin Tarantino — Kill Bill: Volume 2	**Best British Director**: **Matthew Vaughn — Layer Cake**; Edgar Wright — Shaun of the Dead; Paul Greengrass — The Bourne Supremacy; Roger Michell — Enduring Love; Shane Meadows — Dead Man's Shoes
**Best Actor**: **Matt Damon — The Bourne Supremacy**; Jim Carrey — Eternal Sunshine of the Spotless Mind; Johnny Depp — Finding Neverland; Tobey Maguire — Spider-Man 2; Tom Cruise — Collateral	**Best British Actor**: **Paddy Considine — Dead Man's Shoes**; Daniel Craig — Layer Cake; Paul Bettany — Wimbledon; Rhys Ifans — Enduring Love; Simon Pegg — Shaun of the Dead
**Best Actress**: **Julie Delpy — Before Sunset**; Bryce Dallas Howard — The Village; Cate Blanchett — The Aviator; Kirsten Dunst — Spider-Man 2; Uma Thurman — Kill Bill: Volume 2	**Best British Actress**: **Kate Winslet — Eternal Sunshine of the Spotless Mind**; Imelda Staunton — Vera Drake; Kate Ashfield — Shaun of the Dead; Keira Knightley — King Arthur; Samantha Morton — Enduring Love
**Best Newcomer**: **Freddie Highmore — Finding Neverland**; Bryce Dallas Howard — The Village; Matthew Vaughn — Layer Cake; Sienna Miller — Alfie and Layer Cake; Zach Braff — Garden State	**Sony Ericsson Scene of the Year**: **Enduring Love: The balloon sequence**; Kill Bill: Volume 2: "The Bride" versus "Elle" sequence; Shaun of the Dead: The records and zombies scene; Spider-Man 2: Spider-Man battles Dr. Octopus on the train; The Bourne Supremacy: The Moscow car chase sequence
**Honorary Awards**: Empire Inspiration Award: **Pixar**; Independent Spirit Award: **Kevin Smith**; Icon of the Decade: **Quentin Tarantino**; Outstanding Contribution to British Cinema: **Working Title Films**	

=== Multiple awards ===
The following film received multiple awards:

Awards	Film
2	The Bourne Supremacy

=== Multiple nominations ===
The following 11 films received multiple nominations:

Nominations	Film
5	Enduring Love
5	Layer Cake
5	Shaun of the Dead
5	Spider-Man 2
4	Kill Bill: Volume 2
4	The Bourne Supremacy
3	Collateral
3	Dead Man's Shoes
3	Eternal Sunshine of the Spotless Mind
3	The Village
2	Finding Neverland
