= 19th Empire Awards =

2014 British film awards ceremony

- The logo for the 19th Empire Awards
- Date: 30 March 2014
- Site: Grosvenor House Hotel, London, England
- Hosted by: James Nesbitt

Highlights
- Best Film: Gravity
- Best British Film: The World's End
- Most awards: Gravity and The Hobbit: The Desolation of Smaug (2)
- Most nominations: The Hobbit: The Desolation of Smaug (7)

The 19th Empire Awards ceremony (officially known as the Jameson Empire Awards), presented by the British film magazine Empire, honored the best films of 2013 and took place on 30 March 2014 at the Grosvenor House Hotel in London, England. During the ceremony, Empire presented Empire Awards in 14 categories as well as five honorary awards. The awards for Best Best Supporting Actor and Best Supporting Actress were first introduced this year. To celebrate the 25th anniversary of Empire magazine two special honorary awards were presented, the Action Hero of our Lifetime and the Legend of our Lifetime awards. Irish actor James Nesbitt hosted the show for the first time. The awards were sponsored by Jameson Irish Whiskey for the sixth consecutive year.

In related events, Empire and Jameson Irish Whiskey held the 5th Done In 60 Seconds Competition Global Final on March 29, 2014 at The Brewery, London, England. The team of judges consisted of Empire editor-in-chief Mark Dinning, Sky Movies Premiere English presenter Alex Zane, Scottish radio DJ Edith Bowman, Scottish director Jon S. Baird and English director Ben Wheatley, which selected from a shortlist of 24 nominees the five Done In 60 Seconds Award finalists that were invited to the Empire Awards where the winner was announced.

Gravity won two awards including Best Film and Best Director for Alfonso Cuarón. Other winners included The Hobbit: The Desolation of Smaug also with two awards and 12 Years a Slave, Alan Partridge: Alpha Papa, Blue Jasmine, Filth, Saving Mr. Banks, The Conjuring, The Hunger Games: Catching Fire, The Wolf of Wall Street and The World's End with one. Simon Pegg received the Empire Hero Award, Hugh Jackman received the Empire Icon Award, Paul Greengrass received the Empire Inspiration Award, Arnold Schwarzenegger received the special honorary 25th anniversary Action Hero of our Lifetime award and Tom Cruise received the special honorary 25th anniversary Legend of our Lifetime award. David Smith from the United Kingdom won the Done In 60 Seconds Award for There Will Be Blood (Milk), his 60-second film version of There Will Be Blood.

== Winners and nominees ==
Winners are listed first and highlighted in boldface.

**Best Film**: **Gravity**; 12 Years a Slave; Captain Phillips; The Hobbit: The Desolation of Smaug; The Hunger Games: Catching Fire	**Best British Film**: **The World's End**; Alan Partridge: Alpha Papa; Filth; Rush; Sunshine on Leith
**Best Director**: **Alfonso Cuarón — Gravity**; Edgar Wright — The World's End; Paul Greengrass — Captain Phillips; Peter Jackson — The Hobbit: The Desolation of Smaug; Steve McQueen — 12 Years a Slave	
**Best Actor**: **James McAvoy — Filth**; Chiwetel Ejiofor — 12 Years a Slave; Leonardo DiCaprio — The Wolf of Wall Street; Martin Freeman — The Hobbit: The Desolation of Smaug; Tom Hanks — Captain Phillips	**Best Actress**: **Emma Thompson — Saving Mr. Banks**; Amy Adams — American Hustle; Cate Blanchett — Blue Jasmine; Jennifer Lawrence — The Hunger Games: Catching Fire; Sandra Bullock — Gravity
**Best Supporting Actor**: **Michael Fassbender — 12 Years a Slave**; Daniel Brühl — Rush; Richard Armitage — The Hobbit: The Desolation of Smaug; Sam Claflin — The Hunger Games: Catching Fire; Tom Hiddleston — Thor: The Dark World	**Best Supporting Actress**: **Sally Hawkins — Blue Jasmine**; Evangeline Lilly — The Hobbit: The Desolation of Smaug; Jennifer Lawrence — American Hustle; Lupita Nyong'o — 12 Years a Slave; Mia Wasikowska — Stoker
**Best Male Newcomer**: **Aidan Turner — The Hobbit: The Desolation of Smaug**; Barkhad Abdi — Captain Phillips; George MacKay — Sunshine on Leith; Oscar Isaac — Inside Llewyn Davis; Tye Sheridan — Mud; Will Poulter — We're the Millers	**Best Female Newcomer**: **Margot Robbie — The Wolf of Wall Street**; Adèle Exarchopoulos — Blue Is the Warmest Colour; Antonia Thomas — Sunshine on Leith; Elizabeth Debicki — The Great Gatsby; Freya Mavor — Sunshine on Leith; Lupita Nyong'o — 12 Years a Slave
**Best Comedy**: **Alan Partridge: Alpha Papa**; Anchorman 2: The Legend Continues; The World's End; This Is 40; This Is the End	**Best Horror**: **The Conjuring**; A Field in England; Evil Dead; World War Z; You're Next
**Best Sci-Fi/Fantasy**: **The Hobbit: The Desolation of Smaug**; Gravity; Pacific Rim; Star Trek Into Darkness; The Hunger Games: Catching Fire	**Best Thriller**: **The Hunger Games: Catching Fire**; Captain Phillips; Now You See Me; Prisoners; Trance
**Done In 60 Seconds**: **United Kingdom: There Will Be Blood (Milk) (There Will Be Blood) by David Smith** (Note: Done In 60 Seconds: There Will Be Blood (Milk) by David Smith on YouTube); Finalists: Israel: Gravity by Leigh Lahav (Note: Done In 60 Seconds: Gravity by Leigh Lahav on YouTube); Portugal: Vertigo by João Carrilho (Note: Done In 60 Seconds: Vertigo by João Carrilho on YouTube); Russia: Paranormal Activity: Bad Realtor (Paranormal Activity) by Ramil Karipov (Note: Done In 60 Seconds: Paranormal Activity: Bad Realtor by Ramil Karipov on YouTube); United Kingdom: Gravity in 2D (Gravity) by Michael Hall (Note: Done In 60 Seconds: Gravity in 2D by Michael Hall on YouTube); The other shortlisted films: Armenia: The Artist by Arsen Avdalyan (Note: Done In 60 Seconds: The Artist by Arsen Avdalyan on YouTube); Bosnia: The Prestige by Jasmin Pivić (Note: Done In 60 Seconds: The Prestige by Jasmin Pivić on YouTube); Brazil: Finding Nemo by Fernanda Caruso & Tuca Zorzetto (Note: Done In 60 Seconds: Finding Nemo by Fernanda Caruso & Tuca Zorzetto on YouTube); Bulgaria: BU Star Wars Episode IV (Star Wars) by Dimitar Stafidov (Note: Done In 60 Seconds: BU Star Wars Episode IV by Dimitar Stafidov on YouTube); Croatia: Memento by Dinka Radonić (Note: Done In 60 Seconds: Memento by Dinka Radonić on YouTube); Czech Republic: American Beauty by Taťána Rubášová (Note: Done In 60 Seconds: American Beauty by Taťána Rubášová on YouTube); Greece: Cast Away by Ιoanna Sotiriou (Note: Done In 60 Seconds: Cast Away by Ιoanna Sotiriou on YouTube); India: Modern Times by Ritesh Varma (Note: Done In 60 Seconds: Modern Times by Ritesh Varma on YouTube); Kazakhstan: Sherlock Holmes by Diana Bimakhimova (Note: Done In 60 Seconds: Sherlock Holmes by Diana Bimakhimova on YouTube); Romania: The Wolverine by Catalin Palavescu (Note: Done In 60 Seconds: The Wolverine by Catalin Palavescu on YouTube); Russia: 1+1 Intouchables (The Intouchables) by Alex Knyazeva (Note: Done In 60 Seconds: 1+1 Intouchables by Alex Knyazeva on YouTube); Russia: Baking Bread (Breaking Bad) by Lena Bubnova (Note: Done In 60 Seconds: Baking Bread by Lena Bubnova on YouTube); Russia: Gone in 60 Seconds by Sofia Anchugina (Note: Done In 60 Seconds: Gone in 60 Seconds by Sofia Anchugina on YouTube); Russia: Slumdog Millionaire by Maria Vdovenko (Note: Done In 60 Seconds: Slumdog Millionaire by Maria Vdovenko on YouTube); Serbia: Pulp Fiction aka Pulp Fixed (Pulp Fiction) by Dragomir Leko (Note: Done In 60 Seconds: Pulp Fiction aka Pulp Fixed by Dragomir Leko on YouTube); Ukraine: Leon Killer (Léon: The Professional) by Liliana Tymoshenko (Note: Done In 60 Seconds: Leon Killer by Liliana Tymoshenko on YouTube); United Kingdom: Dead Poets Society by Tony Byrnes (Note: Done In 60 Seconds: Dead Poets Society by Tony Byrnes on YouTube); United Kingdom: Manhattan by Jonathan Farrelly & Alice Toner (Note: Done In 60 Seconds: Manhattan by Jonathan Farrelly & Alice Toner on YouTube); United Kingdom: The (con) Artist (The Artist) by Claire Carter (Note: Done In 60 Seconds: The (con) Artist by Claire Carter on YouTube)	**Honorary Awards**: Empire Hero Award: **Simon Pegg**; Empire Icon Award: **Hugh Jackman**; Empire Inspiration Award: **Paul Greengrass**; Empire 25th Award: Action Hero of our Lifetime: **Arnold Schwarzenegger**; Empire 25th Award: Legend of our Lifetime: **Tom Cruise**

=== Multiple awards ===
The following two films received multiple awards:

Awards	Film
2	Gravity
2	The Hobbit: The Desolation of Smaug

=== Multiple nominations ===
The following 13 films received multiple nominations:

Nominations	Film
7	The Hobbit: The Desolation of Smaug
6	12 Years a Slave
5	Captain Phillips
5	The Hunger Games: Catching Fire
4	Gravity
4	Sunshine on Leith
3	The World's End
2	Alan Partridge: Alpha Papa
2	American Hustle
2	Blue Jasmine
2	Filth
2	Rush
2	The Wolf of Wall Street
