= 23rd Empire Awards =

2018 British film awards ceremony

- Date: 18 March 2018
- Site: London, England

Highlights
- Most nominations: Star Wars: The Last Jedi (9)

The 23rd Empire Awards ceremony (officially known as the Rakuten Empire Awards), presented by the British film magazine Empire, honored the best films of 2017. The ceremony took place on 18 March 2018 in London, England at the Roundhouse Theatre. The nominees were announced on 18 January 2018.

These are the last Empire Awards to be held so far.

== Winners and nominees ==
Winners are listed first and highlighted in boldface.

**Best Film**: **Star Wars: The Last Jedi**; Call Me by Your Name; Get Out; Thor: Ragnarok; Wonder Woman	**Best British Film**: **God's Own Country**; Darkest Hour; Dunkirk; Paddington 2; The Death of Stalin
**Best Director**: **Rian Johnson — Star Wars: The Last Jedi**; Patty Jenkins — Wonder Woman; Jordan Peele — Get Out; Taika Waititi — Thor: Ragnarok; Edgar Wright — Baby Driver	**Best Screenplay**: **Jordan Peele — Get Out**; Armando Iannucci, David Schneider, Ian Martin and Peter Fellows — The Death of Stalin; James Ivory — Call Me by Your Name; Francis Lee — God's Own Country; Martin McDonagh — Three Billboards Outside Ebbing, Missouri
**Best Actor**: **Hugh Jackman — Logan**; John Boyega — Star Wars: The Last Jedi; Armie Hammer — Call Me by Your Name; Gary Oldman — Darkest Hour; Andy Serkis — War for the Planet of the Apes	**Best Actress**: **Daisy Ridley — Star Wars: The Last Jedi**; Gal Gadot — Wonder Woman; Tiffany Haddish — Girls Trip; Frances McDormand — Three Billboards Outside Ebbing, Missouri; Emma Watson — Beauty and the Beast
**Best Male Newcomer**: **Josh O'Connor — God's Own Country**; Timothée Chalamet — Call Me by Your Name; Ansel Elgort — Baby Driver; Daniel Kaluuya — Get Out; Fionn Whitehead — Dunkirk	**Best Female Newcomer**: **Dafne Keen — Logan**; Emily Beecham — Daphne; Florence Pugh — Lady Macbeth; Tessa Thompson — Thor: Ragnarok; Kelly Marie Tran — Star Wars: The Last Jedi
**Best Comedy**: **The Death of Stalin**; Girls Trip; The Big Sick; The Disaster Artist; Toni Erdmann	**Best Horror**: **Get Out**; It; mother!; Split; The Autopsy of Jane Doe
**Best Sci-Fi/Fantasy**: **Wonder Woman**; Blade Runner 2049; Logan; Star Wars: The Last Jedi; Thor: Ragnarok	**Best Thriller**: **Kingsman: The Golden Circle**; Baby Driver; John Wick: Chapter 2; The Handmaiden; Three Billboards Outside Ebbing, Missouri
**Best Animated Film**: **Coco**; Captain Underpants: The First Epic Movie; My Life as a Courgette; The Lego Batman Movie; The Red Turtle	**Best Documentary**: **I Am Not Your Negro**; An Inconvenient Sequel: Truth to Power; City of Ghosts; I Called Him Morgan; Jim & Andy: The Great Beyond
**Best Production Design**: **Baby Driver**; Dunkirk; Guardians of the Galaxy Vol. 2; Star Wars: The Last Jedi; Thor: Ragnarok	**Best Soundtrack**: **Baby Driver**; Beauty and the Beast; Call Me by Your Name; Guardians of the Galaxy Vol. 2; Logan Lucky
**Best Visual Effects**: **Star Wars: The Last Jedi**; Ghost in the Shell; Guardians of the Galaxy Vol. 2; Thor: Ragnarok; War for the Planet of the Apes	**Best Costume Design**: **Michael Kaplan — Star Wars: The Last Jedi**; Alexandra Byrne — Guardians of the Galaxy Vol. 2; Suzie Harman — The Death of Stalin; Ellen Mirojnick — The Greatest Showman; Mayes C. Rubeo — Thor: Ragnarok
**Best Makeup and Hair Styling**: **Beauty and the Beast**; Ghost in the Shell; Murder on the Orient Express; The Greatest Showman; Thor: Ragnarok	**Best TV Series**: **The Crown**; Big Little Lies; Stranger Things; The Handmaid's Tale; Twin Peaks
**Best Actor in a TV Series**: **Jason Isaacs — Star Trek: Discovery**; Kyle MacLachlan — Twin Peaks; Alexander Skarsgård — Big Little Lies; Matt Smith — The Crown; Dan Stevens — Legion	**Best Actress in a TV Series**: **Nicole Kidman — Big Little Lies**; Millie Bobby Brown — Stranger Things; Claire Foy — The Crown; Elisabeth Moss — The Handmaid's Tale; Reese Witherspoon — Big Little Lies
**Honorary Awards**: Empire Icon Award: **Mark Hamill**; Empire Legend of our Lifetime Award: **Steven Spielberg**

=== Multiple awards ===
The following films received multiple awards:

Awards	Film
5	Star Wars: The Last Jedi
2	Baby Driver; Get Out; God's Own Country; Logan

=== Multiple nominations ===
The following films received multiple nominations:

Awards	Film
9	Star Wars: The Last Jedi
8	Thor: Ragnarok
5	Baby Driver; Call Me by Your Name; Get Out
4	Big Little Lies; Guardians of the Galaxy Vol. 2 The Death of Stalin; Wonder Woman
3	Beauty and the Beast; Dunkirk; God's Own Country; Logan; The Crown; Three Billboards Outside Ebbing, Missouri
2	Darkest Hour; Girls Trip; Ghost in the Shell; Stranger Things; The Handmaid's Tale; Twin Peaks; War for the Planet of the Apes
