= 11th Empire Awards =

2006 British film awards ceremony

- The logo for the 11th Empire Awards
- Date: 13 March 2006
- Site: Hilton London Metropole Hotel, London, England
- Hosted by: Bill Bailey

Highlights
- Best Film: King Kong
- Best British Film: Pride & Prejudice
- Most awards: Pride & Prejudice and Star Wars: Episode III – Revenge of the Sith (2)
- Most nominations: King Kong (5)

The 11th Empire Awards ceremony (officially known as the Sony Ericsson Empire Awards), presented by the British film magazine Empire, honored the best films of 2005 and took place on 13 March 2006 at the Hilton London Metropole Hotel in London, England. During the ceremony, Empire presented Empire Awards in 11 categories as well as four honorary awards. The awards for Best Comedy, Best Horror, Best Sci-Fi/Fantasy and Best Thriller as well as the honorary Empire Icon Award were first introduced this year. Other changes include Best Film and Best British Film being renamed this year only to "Best Movie" and "Best British Movie" respectively. The honorary Lifetime Achievement Award was presented for the last time. English actor Bill Bailey hosted the show for the second time, having previously hosted the 9th ceremony held in 2004. The awards were sponsored by Sony Ericsson for the fourth consecutive year.

Pride & Prejudice won two awards including Best British Movie. Other winners included Star Wars: Episode III – Revenge of the Sith also with two awards and Charlie and the Chocolate Factory, Crash, King Kong, Kiss Kiss Bang Bang, Mrs Henderson Presents, Team America: World Police, The Descent, and Wallace & Gromit: The Curse of the Were-Rabbit with one. Brian Cox received the Empire Icon Award, Stephen Frears received the Empire Inspiration Award, Tony Curtis received the Lifetime Achievement Award and the Harry Potter films received the Outstanding Contribution to British Cinema Award.

== Winners and nominees ==
Winners are listed first and highlighted in boldface.

**Best Movie**: **King Kong**; Crash; Sin City; Star Wars: Episode III – Revenge of the Sith; War of the Worlds	**Best British Movie**: **Pride & Prejudice**; Harry Potter and the Goblet of Fire; Stoned; The Descent; The Hitchhiker's Guide to the Galaxy; Wallace & Gromit: The Curse of the Were-Rabbit
**Best Director**: **Nick Park and Steve Box — Wallace & Gromit: The Curse of the Were-Rabbit**; Christopher Nolan — Batman Begins; Joe Wright — Pride & Prejudice; Peter Jackson — King Kong; Ron Howard — Cinderella Man; Steven Spielberg — War of the Worlds	
**Best Actor**: **Johnny Depp — Charlie and the Chocolate Factory**; Andy Serkis — King Kong; Christian Bale — Batman Begins; Matt Dillon — Crash; Viggo Mortensen — A History of Violence	**Best Actress**: **Thandie Newton — Crash**; Hilary Swank — Million Dollar Baby; Keira Knightley — Pride & Prejudice; Naomi Watts — King Kong; Renée Zellweger – Cinderella Man
**Best Comedy**: **Team America: World Police**; The Hitchhiker's Guide to the Galaxy; The League of Gentlemen's Apocalypse; Wallace & Gromit: The Curse of the Were-Rabbit; Wedding Crashers	**Best Horror**: **The Descent**; Land of the Dead; The Skeleton Key; Wolf Creek
**Best Sci-Fi/Fantasy**: **Star Wars: Episode III – Revenge of the Sith**; Harry Potter and the Goblet of Fire; King Kong; Serenity; The Chronicles of Narnia: The Lion, the Witch and the Wardrobe	**Best Thriller**: **Kiss Kiss Bang Bang**; A History of Violence; Batman Begins; Sin City; The Constant Gardener
**Best Newcomer**: **Kelly Reilly — Mrs Henderson Presents and Pride & Prejudice**; Georgie Henley — The Chronicles of Narnia: The Lion, the Witch and the Wardrobe; James McAvoy — The Chronicles of Narnia: The Lion, the Witch and the Wardrobe; Leo Gregory — Stoned; Nathan Fillion — Serenity	**Sony Ericsson Scene of the Year**: **Star Wars: Episode III – Revenge of the Sith: The birth of Vader**; Crash: The car rescue; The Descent: The attack of the crawlers; Wallace & Gromit: The Curse of the Were-Rabbit: The dogfight; War of the Worlds: The arrival
**Honorary Awards**: Empire Icon Award: **Brian Cox**; Empire Inspiration Award: **Stephen Frears**; Lifetime Achievement Award: **Tony Curtis**; Outstanding Contribution To British Cinema: **The Harry Potter films.**	

=== Multiple awards ===
The following two films received multiple awards:

Awards	Film
2	Pride & Prejudice
2	Star Wars: Episode III – Revenge of the Sith

=== Multiple nominations ===
The following 16 films received multiple nominations:

Nominations	Film
5	King Kong
4	Crash
4	Pride & Prejudice
4	Wallace & Gromit: The Curse of the Were-Rabbit
3	Batman Begins
3	Star Wars: Episode III – Revenge of the Sith
3	The Chronicles of Narnia: The Lion, the Witch and the Wardrobe
3	The Descent
3	War of the Worlds
2	A History of Violence
2	Cinderella Man
2	Harry Potter and the Goblet of Fire
2	Serenity
2	Sin City
2	Stoned
2	The Hitchhiker's Guide to the Galaxy
