= Chris Hewitt (journalist) =

British film critic, journalist and broadcaster

- Occupations: Journalist, broadcaster
- Years active: 2001 –
- Known for: The Empire Film Podcast

Chris Hewitt is a British film critic, journalist and broadcaster. He has worked for Empire since 2001. He is host of The Empire Film Podcast and has also worked as film reviewer on BBC television and for BBC Radio 6.

== Career ==
From Banbridge, County Down, Hewitt joined Empire magazine in 2001. From 2011, in addition to working on the Empire magazine, he has hosted The Empire Film Podcast. He has also worked as film reviewer on BBC television and for BBC Radio 6.

Hewitt has hosted Empire live shows in places such as Belfast, Edinburgh, Liverpool and Brighton alongside "colleagues of such lethal cunning," as they are referred to on the show, including film journalists Helen O’Hara, James Dyer and Terri White. In July 2022, the Empire Film Podcast won the “Best Live Podcast” category at the British Podcast Awards. The award was given for a live episode held in Kings Place, London to celebrate the podcast’s 500th episode which included returning favourites as well as celebrity movie guests such as Tom Holland, Brett Goldstein and Johnny Knoxville.

Hewitt also presents an Empire ‘Spoiler Special podcast series, episodes of which have included three-hour-long deep dives with the likes of Mission Impossible franchise director Christopher McQuarrie.

Hewitt has appeared as a guest on Films To Be Buried With, with Brett Goldstein, as well as many other film podcasts such as The Evolution of Horror, 90 minutes or less, and The Movie Bunker. A particular fan of the movies of Sam Raimi, Hewitt has frequently discussed his fondness of Evil Dead and Evil Dead 2, in print, on podcast and at live events, and this fondness has been satirised in Empire Magazine.

== Personal life ==
Hewitt is married and lives in Greenwich, London. Hewitt is a supporter of Liverpool FC and has appeared as a guest on Anfield Wrap. Hewitt is also a fan of the American rock band R.E.M and has discussed New Adventures in Hi-Fi as his favourite album.
