= Empire Honorary Awards =

Along with the annual Empire Awards that were presented by Empire magazine for best in acting, directing and film there have been honorary awards which weren't always presented on a consistent annual basis. As of the 19th Empire Awards three honorary awards are currently handed out: Empire Hero Award, Empire Inspiration Award and Icon Award.

== Award history ==
=== Current honorary awards ===
- Empire Hero Award: 2010 to 2018
- Empire Inspiration Award: 1997; 1999 to 2002; 2004 to 2006; 2008; 2010 to 2018
- Empire Legend Award: 2012 to 2018

=== Retired honorary awards ===
- Contribution to Cinema Award: 2000 only
- Outstanding Contribution to British Cinema Award: 2005 to 2006; Outstanding Contribution To British Film: 2008 to 2010; Outstanding Contribution: 2013 only
- Independent Spirit Award: 2002 to 2005
- Lifetime Achievement Award: 1996 to 2003; 2006; Career Achievement Award: 2004 only
- Movie Masterpiece Award: 1999 to 2000
- Empire Icon Award: 2006; 2008 to 2011; 2014

=== Empire Special Honorary Awards ===
- Actor Of Our Lifetime: 2009 only
- Action Hero of Our Lifetime: 2014 only
- Legend of Our Lifetime: 2014 only
- Icon of the Decade: 2005 only
- Heath Ledger Tribute: 2009 only

== Retired honorary awards ==
=== Contribution to Cinema Award ===
The Contribution to Cinema Award was an honorary Empire Award that was presented by Empire magazine only once at the 5th Empire Awards in 2000, to Industrial Light & Magic, in honour of significant contributions to cinema.

==== Winner ====
Year	Winner	Ref
2000 (5th)
2000 (5th)	Industrial Light & Magic	

=== Outstanding Contribution To British Cinema Award ===
The Outstanding Contribution To British Cinema Award also known as the Best Brit Award was an honorary Empire Award that was presented by Empire magazine to honour a British star company or franchise with significant contributions to British cinema. The award was presented at the 10th and 11th Empire Awards in 2005-2006 and was handed out to Working Title Films with Eric Fellner and Tim Bevan accepting the reward and to The Harry Potter films respectively. The award was rewarded again at the 13th, 14th and 15th Empire Awards in 2008-2010 with its name changed to Outstanding Contribution To British Film and was handed out to Shane Meadows, Danny Boyle and Ray Winstone respectively and again during the 18th Empire Awards in 2013 with its name changed that year to Outstanding Contribution and handed out again to Danny Boyle.

==== Winners ====
Year	Winner	Ref
2005 (10th)
2005 (10th)	Working Title Films	
2006 (11th)
2006 (11th)	The Harry Potter films	
2008 (13th)
2008 (13th)	Shane Meadows	
2009 (14th)
2009 (14th)	Danny Boyle	
2010 (15th)
2010 (15th)	Ray Winstone	
2013 (18th)
2013 (18th)	Danny Boyle	

=== Independent Spirit Award ===
The Independent Spirit Award was an honorary Empire Award that was presented by Empire magazine starting with the 7th Empire Awards in 2002 and ending with the 10th Empire Awards in 2005, with awards handed out to Alejandro Amenábar, Michael Winterbottom and Andrew Eaton, Roger Corman and Kevin Smith

==== Winner ====
Year	Winner	Ref
2002 (7th)
2002 (7th)	Alejandro Amenábar – writer, director and Scorer of The Others	
2003 (8th)
2003 (8th)	Michael Winterbottom and Andrew Eaton – director & producer of 24 Hour Party People	
2004 (9th)
2004 (9th)	Roger Corman	
2005 (10th)
2005 (10th)	Kevin Smith	

=== Lifetime Achievement Award ===
The Lifetime Achievement Award was an honorary Empire Award that was presented by Empire magazine from the establishment of the Empire Awards in 1996 until the 11th Empire Awards in 2006, with no award handed out during the 10th Empire Awards. At the 9th Empire Awards in 2004 the award was called Career Achievement Award . The award was handed to honour an individual with a long and distinguished career

==== Winner ====
Year	Winner	Ref
1996 (1st)
1996 (1st)	Mike Leigh	
1997 (2nd)
1997 (2nd)	Freddie Francis	
1998 (3rd)
1998 (3rd)	Dennis Hopper	
1999 (4th)
1999 (4th)	Bob Hoskins	
2000 (5th)
2000 (5th)	Michael Caine	
2001 (6th)
2001 (6th)	Richard Harris	
2002 (7th)
2002 (7th)	Christopher Lee	
2003 (8th)
2003 (8th)	Dustin Hoffman	
2004 (9th)
2004 (9th)	Sigourney Weaver	
2006 (11th)
2006 (11th)	Tony Curtis	

=== Movie Masterpiece Award ===
The Movie Masterpiece Award was an honorary Empire Award that was presented by Empire magazine at the 4th Empire Awards in 1999 and at the 5th Empire Awards in 2000 to films which were considered a masterpiece achievement.

==== Winners ====
Year	Director	Film	Ref
1999 (4th)
1999 (4th)	William Friedkin	The Exorcist	
2000 (5th)
2000 (5th)	Oliver Stone	JFK	

=== Legend Award ===
The Legend Award was an honorary Empire Award that was presented by Empire magazine at the 17th Empire Awards in 2012 and 18th Empire Awards in 2013, with awards handed out to Tim Burton and Helen Mirren respectively.

==== Winner ====
Year	Winner	Ref
2012 (17th)
2012 (17th)	Tim Burton	
2013 (18th)
2013 (18th)	Helen Mirren	
2014 (19th)
2014 (19th)	Tom Cruise	
2015 (20th)
2015 (20th)	Ralph Fiennes	
2016 (21st)
2016 (21st)	Alan Rickman	
2017 (22nd)
2017 (22nd)	Patrick Stewart	
2018 (23rd)
2018 (23rd)	Steven Spielberg	
