= List of accolades received by the Austin Powers film series =

List of awards won by the Austin Powers franchise
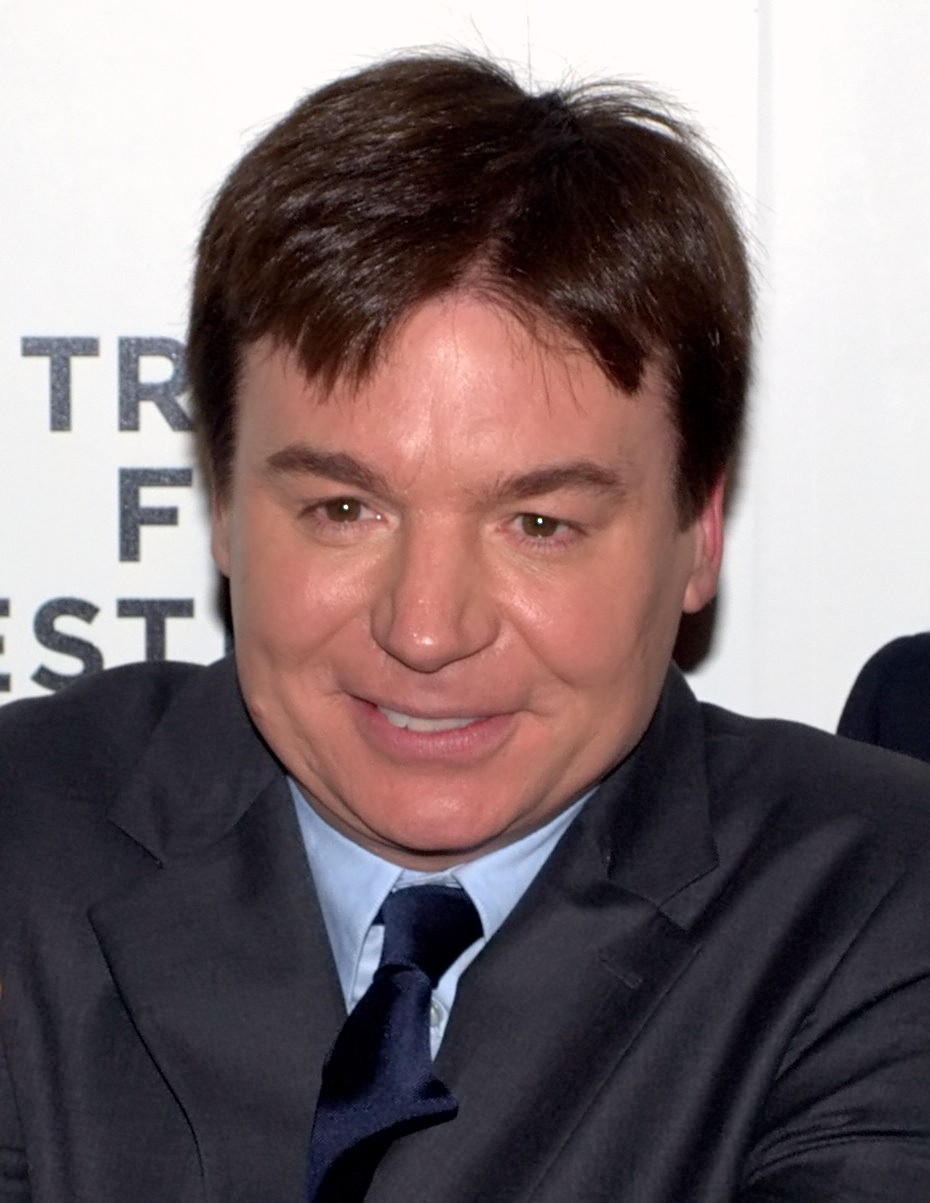
- Mike Myers has won four MTV Movie Awards for his roles in the Austin Powers series
Awards and nominations
Award	Wins	Nominations
Academy Awards	0	1
American Comedy Awards	1	0
BMI Awards	2	0
Blockbuster Entertainment Awards	3	3
Brit Awards	1	0
Canadian Comedy Awards	4	1
Costume Designers Guild	0	1
Empire Awards	0	2
Golden Globe Awards	0	1
Golden Trailer Awards	1	2
Grammy Awards	1	1
Make-Up Artists and Hair Stylists Guild	0	6
Kids' Choice Awards	1	7
Las Vegas Film Critics Society	2	0
MTV Movie Awards	4	8
Satellite Awards	0	3
Saturn Awards	1	4
Teen Choice Awards	2	2
- Total number of wins and nominations
Totals	22	42
- Footnotes

The Austin Powers franchise is a series of action-comedy films consisting of International Man of Mystery (1997), The Spy Who Shagged Me (1999) and Austin Powers in Goldmember (2002). Each film starred and was written by Canadian-English actor Mike Myers, who portrayed the titular character along with several other roles, such as Dr. Evil, Fat Bastard and Goldmember. The series has also featured Basil Exposition (Michael York), Number 2 (Robert Wagner and Rob Lowe), Frau Farbissina (Mindy Sterling), Scott Evil (Seth Green) and Vanessa Kensington (Elizabeth Hurley). The franchise was directed by Jay Roach and distributed by New Line Cinema.

The films have received mixed to positive reviews: International Man of Mystery earned a 70% "fresh" score on Rotten Tomatoes, The Spy Who Shagged Me gained 52%, and In Goldmember 55%. The films are parodies of the earlier features in the James Bond series as well as other 1960s spy films.

Austin Powers has received over 40 award nominations and over 20 wins, with one Academy Award nomination for The Spy Who Shagged Me under the category of Best Makeup and one Grammy Award nomination for Best Soundtrack Album and one Grammy win for Best Song Written for a Motion Picture, Television or Other Visual Media for Madonna's 1999 song "Beautiful Stranger". Other awards for the franchise include four MTV Movie Award wins (with eight nominations), two Teen Choice Awards (two nominations), one Saturn Award (four nominations), one Golden Globe Award nomination, three Satellite Award nominations and two Empire Award nominations.

== International Man of Mystery ==
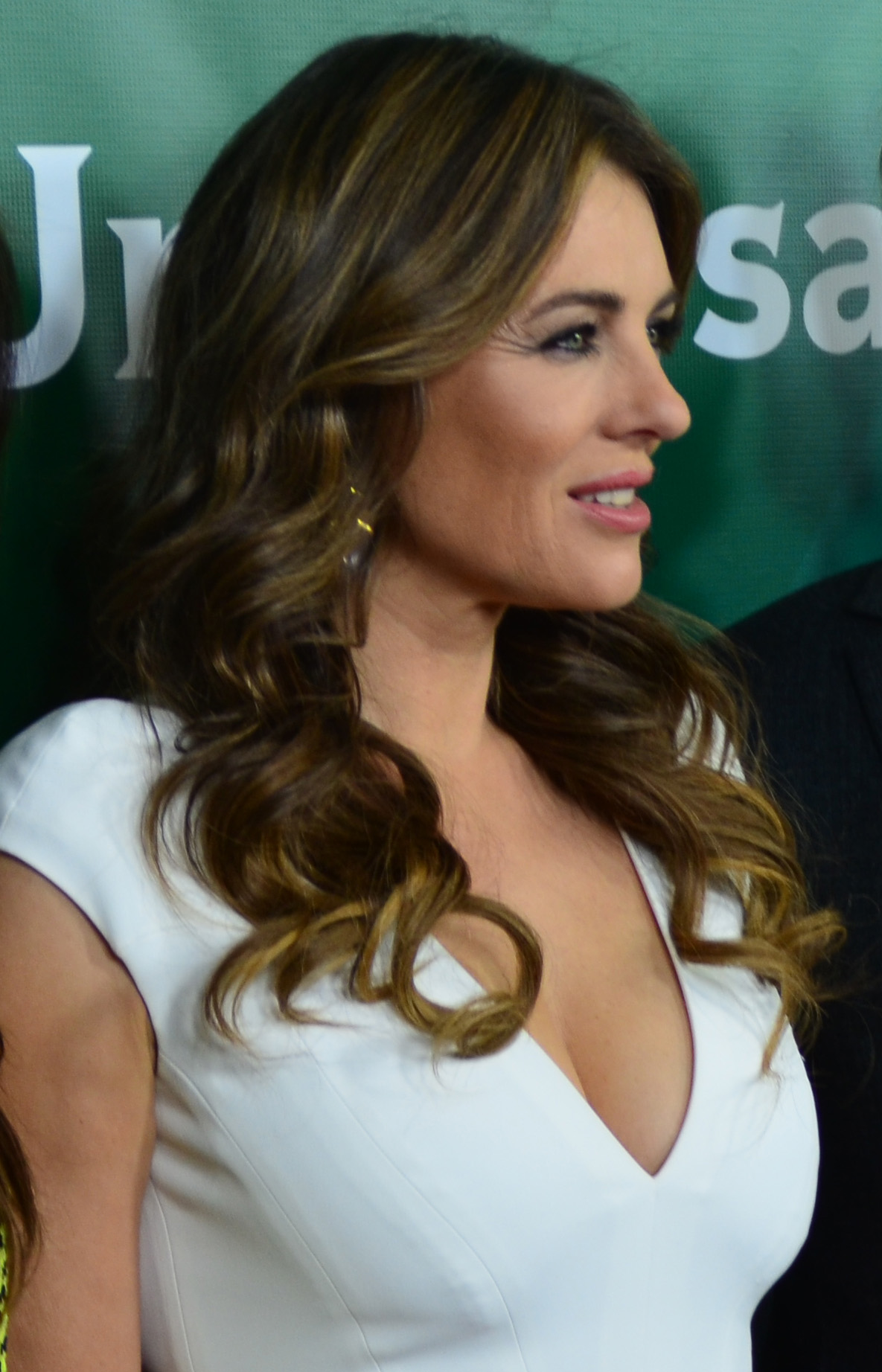
Elizabeth Hurley was nominated for a Blockbuster Entertainment Award for her portrayal of Vanessa Kensington

Award	Category	Recipients	Result
Blockbuster Entertainment Awards	Favorite Actor – Comedy	Mike Myers	Nominated
Blockbuster Entertainment Awards	Favorite Actress – Comedy	Elizabeth Hurley	Nominated
MTV Movie Awards	Best Dance Sequence	Mike Myers	Won
MTV Movie Awards	Best Villain	Mike Myers	Won
MTV Movie Awards	Best Comedic Performance	Mike Myers	Nominated
MTV Movie Awards	Best Movie		Nominated
Saturn Awards	Best Fantasy Film		Won
Saturn Awards	Best Costume Design	Deena Appel	Nominated

== The Spy Who Shagged Me ==
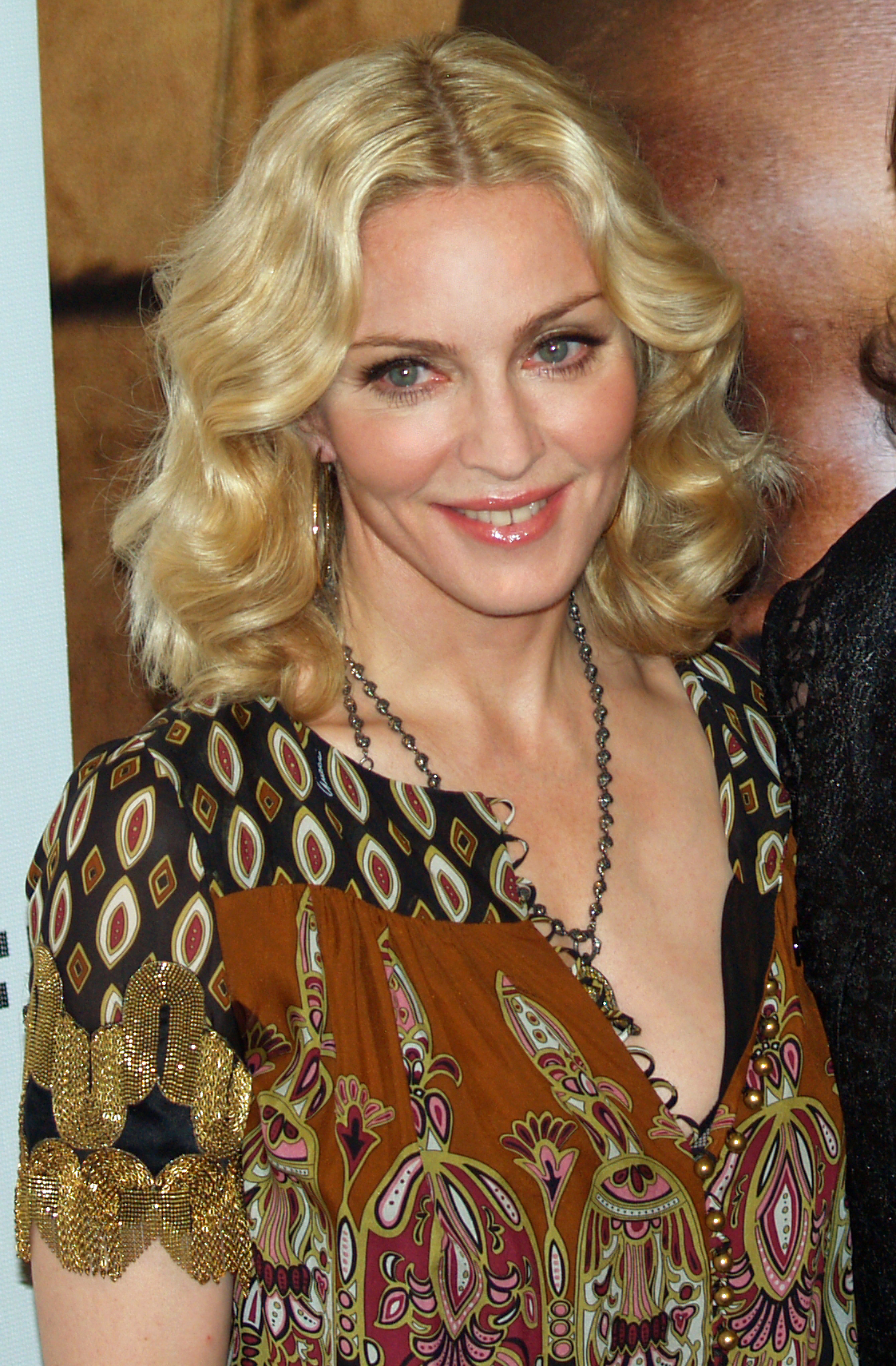
Madonna was nominated for a Golden Globe Award and won a Grammy Award for her song "Beautiful Stranger"

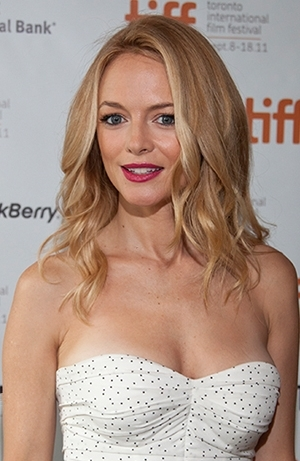
Heather Graham was nominated for a Saturn Award for Best Actress for her role as Felicity Shagwell

Award	Category	Recipients	Result
Academy Awards	Best Makeup	Michèle Burke & Mike Smithson	Nominated
American Comedy Awards	Funniest Actor in a Motion Picture in a Leading Role	Mike Myers	Won
Blockbuster Entertainment Awards	Favorite Actress – Comedy	Heather Graham	Won
Blockbuster Entertainment Awards	Favorite Soundtrack		Won
Blockbuster Entertainment Awards	Favorite Villain	Mike Myers	Won
Blockbuster Entertainment Awards	Favorite Actor – Comedy	Mike Myers	Nominated
Blockbuster Entertainment Awards	Favorite Supporting Actor – Comedy	Verne Troyer	Nominated
Blockbuster Entertainment Awards	Favorite Supporting Actress – Comedy	Mindy Sterling	Nominated
BMI Awards	BMI Film Music Award	George S. Clinton	Won
Brit Awards	Best Soundtrack		Won
Canadian Comedy Awards	Film – Performance – Male	Mike Myers	Won
Canadian Comedy Awards	Film – Writing – Original	Mike Myers	Won
Costume Designers Guild Awards	Excellence in Period/Fantasy Film	Deena Appel	Nominated
Golden Globe Awards	Best Original Song	"Beautiful Stranger" by Madonna & William Orbit	Nominated
Golden Trailer Awards	Best Comedy Trailer		Won
Golden Trailer Awards	Best of Show		Nominated
Grammy Awards	Best Song Written for a Motion Picture, Television, or Other Visual Media (for "Beautiful Stranger")	"Beautiful Stranger" by Madonna & William Orbit	Won
Grammy Awards	Best Soundtrack Album	Danny Bramson & Guy Oseary| style="background: #FFE3E3; color: black; vertical-align: middle; text-align: center; " class="no table-no2 notheme"|Nominated	
Make-Up Artists and Hair Stylists Guild	Best Period Hair Styling – Feature	Candy L. Walken, Jeri Baker, Jennifer Bower O'Halloran & Toni-Ann Walker	Nominated
Make-Up Artists and Hair Stylists Guild	Best Period Makeup – Feature	Patty York, Cheryl Ann Nick, Michèle Burke & Steve Artmont	Nominated
Make-Up Artists and Hair Stylists Guild	Best Special Effects Makeup – Feature	Michèle Burke, Kenny Myers, Will Huff & Kevin Haney	Nominated
Make-Up Artists and Hair Stylists Guild	Best Special Effects Makeup – Feature	Stan Winston & Mike Smithson	Nominated
Kids' Choice Awards	Favorite Movie		Nominated
Kids' Choice Awards	Favorite Movie Actor	Mike Myers	Nominated
Kids' Choice Awards	Favorite Movie Couple	Heather Graham & Mike Myers	Nominated
Kids' Choice Awards	Favorite Song from a Movie	"Beautiful Stranger" by Madonna & William Orbit	Nominated
Las Vegas Film Critics Society	Best Home Video Packaging		Won
Las Vegas Film Critics Society	Best Song	"Beautiful Stranger" by Madonna & William Orbit	Won
MTV Movie Awards	Best Villain	Mike Myers	Won
MTV Movie Awards	Best Comedic Performance	Mike Myers	Nominated
MTV Movie Awards	Best Fight	Mike Myers & Verne Troyer	Nominated
MTV Movie Awards	Best Movie		Nominated
MTV Movie Awards	Best Musical Performance	Mike Myers & Verne Troyer	Nominated
Saturn Awards	Best Actress	Heather Graham	Nominated
Saturn Awards	Best Fantasy Film		Nominated
Teen Choice Awards	Choice Comedy Movie		Won
Teen Choice Awards	Choice Movie Villain	Mike Myers	Won
Teen Choice Awards	Choice Movie Chemistry	Mike Myers & Mindy Sterling	Nominated

== In Goldmember ==
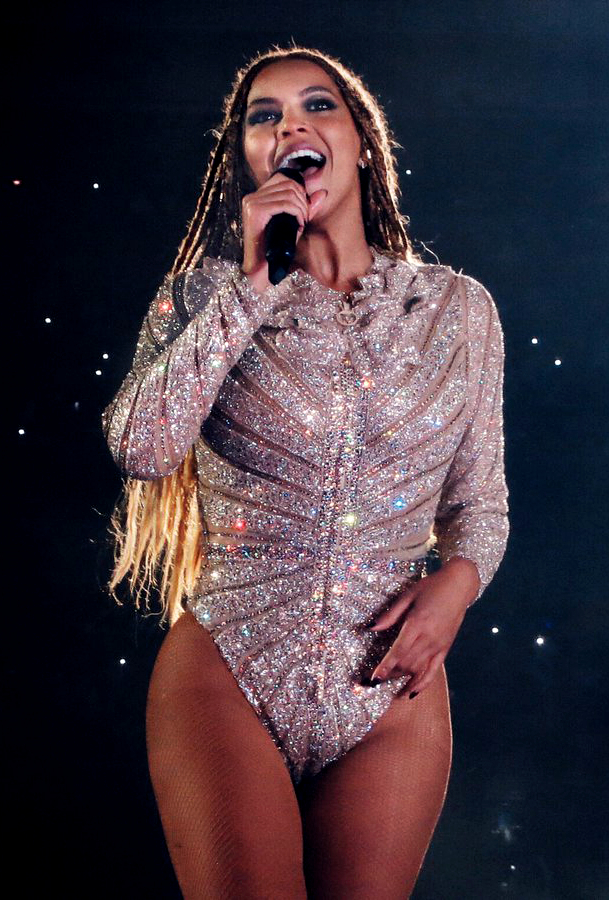
Beyoncé Knowles was nominated for an MTV Movie Award for Best Female Breakthrough Performance

Award	Category	Recipients	Result
BMI Film & Television Awards	BMI Film Music Award	George S. Clinton	Won
Canadian Comedy Awards	Film – Pretty Funny Male Performance	Mike Myers	Won
Canadian Comedy Awards	Film – Pretty Funny Writing	Mike Myers	Won
Empire Awards	Best Actor	Mike Myers	Nominated
Empire Awards	Scene of the Year	The opening sequence	Nominated
Make-Up Artists and Hair Stylists Guild	Best Character Hair Styling – Feature	Candy L. Walken, Jeri Baker & Susan V. Kalinowski	Nominated
Make-Up Artists and Hair Stylists Guild	Best Period Hair Styling – Feature	Candy L. Walken, Jeri Baker & Susan V. Kalinowski	Nominated
Kids' Choice Awards	Favorite Movie		Won
Kids' Choice Awards	Favorite Female Butt Kicker	Beyoncé Knowles	Nominated
Kids' Choice Awards	Favorite Movie Actor	Mike Myers	Nominated
Kids' Choice Awards	Favorite Fart in a Movie		Nominated
MTV Movie Awards	Best Comedic Performance	Mike Myers	Won
MTV Movie Awards	Best Villain	Mike Myers	Nominated
MTV Movie Awards	Best Female Breakthrough Performance	Beyoncé Knowles	Nominated
Satellite Awards	Best Costume Design	Deena Appel	Nominated
Satellite Awards	Best Original Song	"Work It Out" by Beyoncé Knowles, Pharrell Williams & Chad Hugo	Nominated
Satellite Awards	Best Overall DVD		Nominated
Saturn Awards	Best Costume Design	Deena Appel	Nominated
Teen Choice Awards	Choice Comedy Movie Actor	Mike Myers	Nominated
Teen Choice Awards	Choice Breakout Movie Actress	Beyoncé Knowles	Nominated
