= Fourth Empire =

Fourth Empire may refer to:

- Fourth British Empire, a concept in the historiography of the British Empire
- Fourth world-empire, the last of the four kingdoms of Daniel
  - Roman Empire, the traditional interpretation of the fourth kingdom of Daniel in Christian eschatology
- Fourth Reich, a hypothetical successor of Nazi Germany
- Fourth Empire, a fictional organization in Star Gladiator
- Fourth Empire, the main antagonists of Galaxy Force (video game)

== See also ==
- First Empire (disambiguation)
- Second Empire (disambiguation)
- Third Empire (disambiguation)
- Fifth Empire
