= 5th Empire Awards =

2000 British film awards ceremony

- The logo for the 5th Empire Awards
- Date: 17 February 2000
- Site: Park Lane Hotel, London, England
- Empire issue: #130 (April 2000)

Highlights
- Best Film: The Matrix
- Best British Film: Notting Hill
- Most awards: Notting Hill (3)
- Most nominations: The Sixth Sense (6)

The 5th Empire Awards ceremony, presented by the British film magazine Empire, honored the best films of 1999 and took place on 17 February 2000 at the Park Lane Hotel in London, England. During the ceremony, Empire presented Empire Awards in nine categories as well as five honorary awards. The honorary Contribution to Cinema award was introduced and presented for the only time this year. The honorary Movie Masterpiece Award was presented for the last time, having been presented for the first and only other time at the 4th Empire Awards in 1999. The awards were sponsored by Stella Artois for the third consecutive year.

Notting Hill won the most awards with three including Best British Film and Best British Director for Roger Michell. Other winners included The Matrix with two awards including Best Film and East Is East, Fight Club, Shakespeare in Love, The Sixth Sense and The World Is Not Enough with one. Kenneth Branagh received the Empire Inspiration Award, Michael Caine received the Lifetime Achievement Award, Industrial Light & Magic received the Contribution to Cinema award and Oliver Stone received the Movie Masterpiece Award for JFK.

== Winners and nominees ==
Winners are listed first and highlighted in boldface.

**Best Film**: **The Matrix**; Austin Powers: The Spy Who Shagged Me; Fight Club; Notting Hill; The Sixth Sense	**Best British Film**: **Notting Hill**; East Is East; Human Traffic; Little Voice; Shakespeare in Love
**Best Director**: **M. Night Shyamalan — The Sixth Sense**; Ang Lee — Ride with the Devil; Andy and Lana Wachowski — The Matrix; David Fincher — Fight Club; George Lucas — Star Wars: Episode I – The Phantom Menace	**Best British Director**: **Roger Michell — Notting Hill**; Damien O'Donnell — East Is East; John Madden — Shakespeare in Love; Justin Kerrigan — Human Traffic; Mark Herman — Little Voice
**Best Actor**: **Pierce Brosnan — The World Is Not Enough**; Brad Pitt — Fight Club; Bruce Willis — The Sixth Sense; Keanu Reeves — The Matrix; Tom Cruise — Eyes Wide Shut	**Best British Actor**: **Hugh Grant — Notting Hill**; Ewan McGregor — Star Wars: Episode I – The Phantom Menace; Ian McKellen — Gods and Monsters; Joseph Fiennes — Shakespeare in Love; Rhys Ifans — Notting Hill
**Best Actress**: **Gwyneth Paltrow — Shakespeare in Love**; Nicole Kidman — Eyes Wide Shut; Rene Russo — The Thomas Crown Affair; Sophie Marceau — The World Is Not Enough; Toni Collette — The Sixth Sense	**Best British Actress**: **Helena Bonham Carter — Fight Club**; Brenda Blethyn — Little Voice; Kate Winslet — Hideous Kinky; Minnie Driver — An Ideal Husband; Olivia Williams — Rushmore and The Sixth Sense
**Best Debut**: **Carrie-Anne Moss — The Matrix** (tied with the crew of East Is East); **The crew of East Is East** (tied with Carrie-Anne Moss) (Note: East Is East is not listed on the official nomination post on Empire's website, however it is listed as a winner in several other references.); Eduardo Sánchez and Daniel Myrick — The Blair Witch Project; Haley Joel Osment — The Sixth Sense; Jewel — Ride with the Devil; Tim Roth — The War Zone	**Honorary Awards**: Empire Inspiration Award: **Kenneth Branagh**; Lifetime Achievement Award: **Michael Caine**; Movie Masterpiece Award: **Oliver Stone — JFK**; Contribution to Cinema: **Industrial Light & Magic**

=== Multiple awards ===
The following two films received multiple awards:

Awards	Film
3	Notting Hill
2	The Matrix

=== Multiple nominations ===
The following 12 films received multiple nominations:

Nominations	Film
6	The Sixth Sense
5	Notting Hill
4	Fight Club
4	Shakespeare in Love
4	The Matrix
3	East Is East
3	Little Voice
2	Eyes Wide Shut
2	Human Traffic
2	Ride with the Devil
2	Star Wars: Episode I – The Phantom Menace
2	The World Is Not Enough
