= Empire Award for Best Director =

Class of award for professionals in the British and global film industry

- Awarded for: Best film direction
- Country: United Kingdom
- Presented by: Empire magazine
- First award: 1996
- Currently held by: Rian Johnson - Star Wars: The Last Jedi (2018)

The Empire Award for Best Director was an Empire Award presented annually by the British film magazine Empire to honor directors working within the film industry.

== History ==
The Empire Award for Best Director was one of five awards which were first introduced at the 1st Empire Awards ceremony in 1996 (the others being Best Actor, Best Actress, Best Film and Best British Film) with Danny Boyle receiving the award for his direction of Shallow Grave. Winners were chosen by the readers of Empire magazine.

Since its inception, the award was given to 16 directors. Christopher Nolan has received the most awards in this category with three awards. Christopher Nolan and Peter Jackson were nominated on seven occasions, more than any other director. Kathryn Bigelow and Patty Jenkins are the only female directors to be nominated for the award. Rian Johnson was the most recent winner in this category for his direction of Star Wars: The Last Jedi.

== Winners and nominees ==
In the list below, winners are listed first in boldface, followed by the other nominees. The number of the ceremony (1st, 2nd, etc.) appears in parentheses after the awards year, linked to the article (if any) on that ceremony.

"†" indicates Academy Award for Best Director winner

"‡" indicates Academy Award for Best Director nominee

=== 1990s ===
| Year | Director | Film | Ref. |
|---|---|---|---|
| **1996** **(1st)** | **Danny Boyle** | **Shallow Grave** | |
| **1997** **(2nd)** | **Terry Gilliam** | **12 Monkeys** | |
| **1998** **(3rd)** | **Cameron Crowe** | **Jerry Maguire** | |
| **1999** **(4th)** | **Steven Spielberg** † | **Saving Private Ryan** | |
| **1999** **(4th)** | Ang Lee | The Ice Storm | |
| **1999** **(4th)** | James Cameron † | Titanic | |
| **1999** **(4th)** | Peter Weir ‡ | The Truman Show | |
| **1999** **(4th)** | Steven Soderbergh | Out of Sight | |

=== 2000s ===
| Year | Director | Film | Ref. |
|---|---|---|---|
| **2000** **(5th)** | **M. Night Shyamalan** ‡ | **The Sixth Sense** | |
| **2000** **(5th)** | Ang Lee | Ride with the Devil | |
| **2000** **(5th)** | Lily and Lana Wachowski | The Matrix | |
| **2000** **(5th)** | David Fincher | Fight Club | |
| **2000** **(5th)** | George Lucas | Star Wars: Episode I – The Phantom Menace | |
| **2001** **(6th)** | **Bryan Singer** | **X-Men** | |
| **2001** **(6th)** | Ang Lee ‡ | Crouching Tiger, Hidden Dragon | |
| **2001** **(6th)** | Christopher Nolan | Memento | |
| **2001** **(6th)** | Michael Mann ‡ | The Insider | |
| **2001** **(6th)** | Paul Thomas Anderson | Magnolia | |
| **2002** **(7th)** | **Baz Luhrmann** | **Moulin Rouge!** | |
| **2002** **(7th)** | Cameron Crowe | Almost Famous | |
| **2002** **(7th)** | Peter Jackson ‡ | The Lord of the Rings: The Fellowship of the Ring | |
| **2002** **(7th)** | Steven Soderbergh † | Traffic | |
| **2002** **(7th)** | Steven Spielberg | A.I. Artificial Intelligence | |
| **2003** **(8th)** | **Steven Spielberg** | **Minority Report** | |
| **2003** **(8th)** | M. Night Shyamalan | Signs | |
| **2003** **(8th)** | Peter Jackson | The Lord of the Rings: The Two Towers | |
| **2003** **(8th)** | Sam Raimi | Spider-Man | |
| **2003** **(8th)** | Steven Soderbergh | Ocean's Eleven | |
| **2004** **(9th)** | **Quentin Tarantino** | **Kill Bill: Volume 1** | |
| **2004** **(9th)** | Anthony Minghella | Cold Mountain | |
| **2004** **(9th)** | Joel Coen and Ethan Coen | Intolerable Cruelty | |
| **2004** **(9th)** | Peter Jackson † | The Lord of the Rings: The Return of the King | |
| **2004** **(9th)** | Peter Weir | Master and Commander: The Far Side of the World | |
| **2005** **(10th)** | **Sam Raimi** | **Spider-Man 2** | |
| **2005** **(10th)** | M. Night Shyamalan | The Village | |
| **2005** **(10th)** | Michael Mann | Collateral | |
| **2005** **(10th)** | Michel Gondry | Eternal Sunshine of the Spotless Mind | |
| **2005** **(10th)** | Quentin Tarantino | Kill Bill: Volume 2 | |
| **2006** **(11th)** | **Nick Park and Steve Box** | **Wallace & Gromit: The Curse of the Were-Rabbit** | (Note: The 11th Empire Awards in 2006 had six nominees (instead of the usual five) for Best Director.) |
| **2006** **(11th)** | Christopher Nolan | Batman Begins | (Note: The 11th Empire Awards in 2006 had six nominees (instead of the usual five) for Best Director.) |
| **2006** **(11th)** | Joe Wright | Pride & Prejudice | (Note: The 11th Empire Awards in 2006 had six nominees (instead of the usual five) for Best Director.) |
| **2006** **(11th)** | Peter Jackson | King Kong | (Note: The 11th Empire Awards in 2006 had six nominees (instead of the usual five) for Best Director.) |
| **2006** **(11th)** | Ron Howard | Cinderella Man | (Note: The 11th Empire Awards in 2006 had six nominees (instead of the usual five) for Best Director.) |
| **2006** **(11th)** | Steven Spielberg | War of the Worlds | (Note: The 11th Empire Awards in 2006 had six nominees (instead of the usual five) for Best Director.) |
| **2007** **(12th)** | **Christopher Nolan** | **The Prestige** | |
| **2007** **(12th)** | Bryan Singer | Superman Returns | |
| **2007** **(12th)** | George Clooney ‡ | Good Night, and Good Luck | |
| **2007** **(12th)** | Guillermo del Toro | Pan's Labyrinth | |
| **2007** **(12th)** | Martin Scorsese † | The Departed | |
| **2008** **(13th)** | **David Yates** | **Harry Potter and the Order of the Phoenix** | |
| **2008** **(13th)** | David Fincher | Zodiac | |
| **2008** **(13th)** | Edgar Wright | Hot Fuzz | |
| **2008** **(13th)** | Joe Wright | Atonement | |
| **2008** **(13th)** | Paul Greengrass | The Bourne Ultimatum | |
| **2009** **(14th)** | **Christopher Nolan** | **The Dark Knight** | |
| **2009** **(14th)** | Andrew Stanton | WALL-E | |
| **2009** **(14th)** | Joel Coen and Ethan Coen † | No Country for Old Men | |
| **2009** **(14th)** | Paul Thomas Anderson ‡ | There Will Be Blood | |
| **2009** **(14th)** | Tim Burton | Sweeney Todd: The Demon Barber of Fleet Street | |

=== 2010s ===
| Year | Director | Film | Ref. |
|---|---|---|---|
| **2010** **(15th)** | **James Cameron** ‡ | **Avatar** | |
| **2010** **(15th)** | J. J. Abrams | Star Trek | |
| **2010** **(15th)** | Kathryn Bigelow † | The Hurt Locker | |
| **2010** **(15th)** | Neill Blomkamp | District 9 | |
| **2010** **(15th)** | Quentin Tarantino ‡ | Inglourious Basterds | |
| **2011** **(16th)** | **Edgar Wright** | **Scott Pilgrim vs. the World** | |
| **2011** **(16th)** | Christopher Nolan | Inception | |
| **2011** **(16th)** | David Fincher ‡ | The Social Network | |
| **2011** **(16th)** | Matthew Vaughn | Kick-Ass | |
| **2011** **(16th)** | Tom Hooper † | The King's Speech | |
| **2012** **(17th)** | **David Yates** | **Harry Potter and the Deathly Hallows – Part 2** | |
| **2012** **(17th)** | Nicolas Winding Refn | Drive | |
| **2012** **(17th)** | Rupert Wyatt | Rise of the Planet of the Apes | |
| **2012** **(17th)** | Steven Spielberg | War Horse | |
| **2012** **(17th)** | Tomas Alfredson | Tinker Tailor Soldier Spy | |
| **2013** **(18th)** | **Sam Mendes** | **Skyfall** | |
| **2013** **(18th)** | Christopher Nolan | The Dark Knight Rises | |
| **2013** **(18th)** | Joss Whedon | The Avengers | |
| **2013** **(18th)** | Peter Jackson | The Hobbit: An Unexpected Journey | |
| **2013** **(18th)** | Quentin Tarantino | Django Unchained | |
| **2014** **(19th)** | **Alfonso Cuarón** † | **Gravity** | |
| **2014** **(19th)** | Edgar Wright | The World's End | |
| **2014** **(19th)** | Paul Greengrass | Captain Phillips | |
| **2014** **(19th)** | Peter Jackson | The Hobbit: The Desolation of Smaug | |
| **2014** **(19th)** | Steve McQueen ‡ | 12 Years a Slave | |
| **2015** **(20th)** | **Christopher Nolan** | **Interstellar** | |
| **2015** **(20th)** | Matt Reeves | Dawn of the Planet of the Apes | |
| **2015** **(20th)** | Morten Tyldum ‡ | The Imitation Game | |
| **2015** **(20th)** | Peter Jackson | The Hobbit: The Battle of the Five Armies | |
| **2015** **(20th)** | Richard Linklater ‡ | Boyhood | |
| **2016** **(21st)** | **J. J. Abrams** | **Star Wars: The Force Awakens** | |
| **2016** **(21st)** | Ryan Coogler | Creed | |
| **2016** **(21st)** | Alejandro G. Iñárritu † | The Revenant | |
| **2016** **(21st)** | George Miller ‡ | Mad Max: Fury Road | |
| **2016** **(21st)** | Ridley Scott | The Martian | |
| **2017** **(22nd)** | **Gareth Edwards** | **Rogue One: A Star Wars Story** | |
| **2017** **(22nd)** | Taika Waititi | Hunt for the Wilderpeople | |
| **2017** **(22nd)** | Denis Villeneuve ‡ | Arrival | |
| **2017** **(22nd)** | Ken Loach | I, Daniel Blake | |
| **2017** **(22nd)** | Andrea Arnold | American Honey | |
| **2018** **(23rd)** | **Rian Johnson** | **Star Wars: The Last Jedi** | |
| **2018** **(23rd)** | Edgar Wright | Baby Driver | |
| **2018** **(23rd)** | Jordan Peele ‡ | Get Out | |
| **2018** **(23rd)** | Patty Jenkins | Wonder Woman | |
| **2018** **(23rd)** | Taika Waititi | Thor: Ragnarok | |

== Multiple awards and nominations ==
=== Multiple awards ===
The following individuals received two or more Best Director awards:

| Awards | Film |
|---|---|
| 3 | Christopher Nolan |
| 2 | David Yates |
| 2 | Steven Spielberg |

=== Multiple nominations ===
The following individuals received two or more Best Director nominations:

| Nominations | Film |
|---|---|
| 7 | Christopher Nolan |
| 7 | Peter Jackson |
| 5 | Steven Spielberg |
| 4 | Quentin Tarantino |
| 4 | Edgar Wright |
| 3 | Ang Lee |
| 3 | David Fincher |
| 3 | M. Night Shyamalan |
| 3 | Steven Soderbergh |
| 2 | Bryan Singer |
| 2 | Cameron Crowe |
| 2 | David Yates |
| 2 | J. J. Abrams |
| 2 | James Cameron |
| 2 | Joel Coen and Ethan Coen |
| 2 | Joe Wright |
| 2 | Michael Mann |
| 2 | Paul Greengrass |
| 2 | Paul Thomas Anderson |
| 2 | Peter Weir |
| 2 | Sam Raimi |
| 2 | Taika Waititi |
