= Second Empire =

Second Empire may refer to:

- Second British Empire, used by some historians to describe the British Empire after 1783
- Second Bulgarian Empire (1185–1396)
- Second French Empire (1852–1870)
  - Second Empire architecture, an architectural style associated with the Second French Empire
- Second German Empire, sometimes used to describe the German Empire between 1871 and 1918
- Second Empire of Haiti (1849–1859)
- Second Mexican Empire (1864–1867)
- Second Persian Empire, sometimes used to describe the Parthian Empire (ca. 247 BC – 224 AD) or the Sasanian Empire 224 CE - 651 CE)
- 2nd Empire Awards, film awards held in 1997

== See also ==
- First Empire (disambiguation)
- Third Empire (disambiguation)
