= Empire Award for Best Actress =

Former annual British film award

- Awarded for: Best performance by an actress in a leading role
- Country: United Kingdom
- Presented by: Empire magazine
- First award: 1996
- Currently held by: Daisy Ridley – Star Wars: The Last Jedi (2018)

The Empire Award for Best Actress was an Empire Award presented annually by the British film magazine Empire to honor an actress who has delivered an outstanding performance in a leading role, while working within the film industry. The Empire Award for Best Actress was one of five ongoing awards which were first introduced at the 1st Empire Awards ceremony in 1996 (the others being Best Actor, Best Director, Best Film, and Best British Film), with Nicole Kidman receiving the award for her role in To Die For. Winners were chosen by the readers of Empire magazine.

Since its inception, the award was given to 20 actresses. Nicole Kidman has received the most awards in this category, with two awards. Cate Blanchett and Nicole Kidman were nominated on five occasions, more than any other actress. Daisy Ridley was the most recent winner in this category, for her role in Star Wars: The Last Jedi.

== Winners and nominees ==
In the list below, winners are listed first in the colored row in boldface, followed by the other nominees. The number of the ceremony (1st, 2nd, etc.) appears in parentheses after the awards year, linked to the article (if any) on that ceremony.

Table key
Key	Description
	Indicates the winner

=== 1990s ===
Year	Actress	Character	Film	Ref.
**1996** **(1st)**	**Nicole Kidman**	**Suzanne Stone-Maretto**	**To Die For**	
**1997** **(2nd)**	**Frances McDormand**	**Marge Gunderson**	**Fargo**	
**1998** **(3rd)**	**Joan Allen**	**Elizabeth Proctor**	**The Crucible**	
**1999** **(4th)**	**Cate Blanchett**	**Queen Elizabeth I**	**Elizabeth**	
**1999** **(4th)**	Gwyneth Paltrow	Helen Quilley	Sliding Doors	
**1999** **(4th)**	Helen Hunt	Carol Connelly	As Good as It Gets	
**1999** **(4th)**	Jennifer Lopez	Karen Sisco	Out of Sight	
**1999** **(4th)**	Pam Grier	Jackie Brown	Jackie Brown	

=== 2000s ===
Year	Actress	Character	Film	Ref.
**2000** **(5th)**	**Gwyneth Paltrow**	**Viola de Lesseps**	**Shakespeare in Love**	
**2000** **(5th)**	Nicole Kidman	Alice Harford	Eyes Wide Shut	
**2000** **(5th)**	Rene Russo	Catherine Banning	The Thomas Crown Affair	
**2000** **(5th)**	Sophie Marceau	Elektra King	The World Is Not Enough	
**2000** **(5th)**	Toni Collette	Lynn Sear	The Sixth Sense	
**2001** **(6th)**	**Connie Nielsen**	**Lucilla**	**Gladiator**	
**2001** **(6th)**	Angelina Jolie	Lisa Rowe	Girl, Interrupted	
**2001** **(6th)**	Hilary Swank	Brandon Teena	Boys Don't Cry	
**2001** **(6th)**	Julia Roberts	Erin Brockovich	Erin Brockovich	
**2001** **(6th)**	Kate Winslet	Madeleine "Maddy" LeClerc	Quills	
**2002** **(7th)**	**Nicole Kidman**	**Satine**	**Moulin Rouge!**	
**2002** **(7th)**	Audrey Tautou	Amélie Poulain	Amélie	
**2002** **(7th)**	Frances O'Connor	Monica Swinton	A.I. Artificial Intelligence	
**2002** **(7th)**	Nicole Kidman	Grace Stewart	The Others	
**2002** **(7th)**	Renée Zellweger	Bridget Jones	Bridget Jones's Diary	
**2003** **(8th)**	**Kirsten Dunst**	**Mary Jane Watson**	**Spider-Man**	
**2003** **(8th)**	Halle Berry	Giacinta "Jinx" Johnson	Die Another Day	
**2003** **(8th)**	Hilary Swank	Det. Ellie Burr	Insomnia	
**2003** **(8th)**	Jennifer Connelly	Alicia Nash	A Beautiful Mind	
**2003** **(8th)**	Miranda Otto	Éowyn	The Lord of the Rings: The Two Towers	
**2004** **(9th)**	**Uma Thurman**	**The Bride**	**Kill Bill: Volume 1**	
**2004** **(9th)**	Cate Blanchett	Veronica Guerin	Veronica Guerin	
**2004** **(9th)**	Julianne Moore	Cathy Whitaker	Far from Heaven	
**2004** **(9th)**	Maggie Gyllenhaal	Lee Holloway	Secretary	
**2004** **(9th)**	Nicole Kidman	Ada Monroe	Cold Mountain	
**2005** **(10th)**	**Julie Delpy**	**Céline**	**Before Sunset**	
**2005** **(10th)**	Bryce Dallas Howard	Ivy Elizabeth Walker	The Village	
**2005** **(10th)**	Cate Blanchett	Katharine Hepburn	The Aviator	
**2005** **(10th)**	Kirsten Dunst	Mary Jane Watson	Spider-Man 2	
**2005** **(10th)**	Uma Thurman	The Bride / Beatrix Kiddo	Kill Bill: Volume 2	
**2006** **(11th)**	**Thandiwe Newton**	**Christine Thayer**	**Crash**	
**2006** **(11th)**	Hilary Swank	Mary Margaret "Maggie" Fitzgerald	Million Dollar Baby	
**2006** **(11th)**	Keira Knightley	Elizabeth Bennet	Pride & Prejudice	
**2006** **(11th)**	Naomi Watts	Ann Darrow	King Kong	
**2006** **(11th)**	Renée Zellweger	Mae Braddock	Cinderella Man	
**2007** **(12th)**	**Penélope Cruz**	**Raimunda**	**Volver**	
**2007** **(12th)**	Helen Mirren	Queen Elizabeth II	The Queen	
**2007** **(12th)**	Kate Winslet	Sarah Pierce	Little Children	
**2007** **(12th)**	Keira Knightley	Elizabeth Swann	Pirates of the Caribbean: Dead Man's Chest	
**2007** **(12th)**	Reese Witherspoon	June Carter	Walk the Line	
**2008** **(13th)**	**Keira Knightley**	**Cecilia Tallis**	**Atonement**	
**2008** **(13th)**	Angelina Jolie	Mariane Pearl	A Mighty Heart	
**2008** **(13th)**	Cate Blanchett	Queen Elizabeth I	Elizabeth: The Golden Age	
**2008** **(13th)**	Emma Watson	Hermione Granger	Harry Potter and the Order of the Phoenix	
**2008** **(13th)**	Katherine Heigl	Alison Scott	Knocked Up	
**2009** **(14th)**	**Helena Bonham Carter**	**Mrs. Lovett**	**Sweeney Todd: The Demon Barber of Fleet Street**	
**2009** **(14th)**	Angelina Jolie	Christine Collins	Changeling	
**2009** **(14th)**	Elliot Page (Note: Credited as Ellen Page; Juno was released before Page came out as transgender.)	Juno MacGuff	Juno	
**2009** **(14th)**	Olga Kurylenko	Camille Montes	Quantum of Solace	
**2009** **(14th)**	Sally Hawkins	Pauline "Poppy" Cross	Happy-Go-Lucky	

=== 2010s ===
Year	Actress	Character	Film	Ref.
**2010** **(15th)**	**Zoe Saldaña**	**Neytiri**	**Avatar**	
**2010** **(15th)**	Anne-Marie Duff	Julia Lennon	Nowhere Boy	
**2010** **(15th)**	Carey Mulligan	Jenny Mellor	An Education	
**2010** **(15th)**	Emily Blunt	Queen Victoria	The Young Victoria	
**2010** **(15th)**	Mélanie Laurent	Shosanna Dreyfus / Emmanuelle Mimieux	Inglourious Basterds	
**2011** **(16th)**	**Noomi Rapace**	**Lisbeth Salander**	**The Girl with the Dragon Tattoo**	
**2011** **(16th)**	Emma Watson	Hermione Granger	Harry Potter and the Deathly Hallows: Part 1	
**2011** **(16th)**	Helena Bonham Carter	Queen Elizabeth	The King's Speech	
**2011** **(16th)**	Natalie Portman	Nina Sayers / The Swan Queen	Black Swan	
**2011** **(16th)**	Olivia Williams	Ruth Lang	The Ghost Writer	
**2012** **(17th)**	**Olivia Colman**	**Hannah**	**Tyrannosaur**	
**2012** **(17th)**	Carey Mulligan	Irene	Drive	
**2012** **(17th)**	Meryl Streep	Margaret Thatcher	The Iron Lady	
**2012** **(17th)**	Michelle Williams	Marilyn Monroe	My Week with Marilyn	
**2012** **(17th)**	Rooney Mara	Lisbeth Salander	The Girl with the Dragon Tattoo	
**2013** **(18th)**	**Jennifer Lawrence**	**Katniss Everdeen**	**The Hunger Games**	
**2013** **(18th)**	Anne Hathaway	Selina Kyle / Catwoman	The Dark Knight Rises	
**2013** **(18th)**	Jessica Chastain	Maya	Zero Dark Thirty	
**2013** **(18th)**	Judi Dench	M	Skyfall	
**2013** **(18th)**	Naomi Watts	Maria Bennett	The Impossible	
**2014** **(19th)**	**Emma Thompson**	**P. L. Travers**	**Saving Mr. Banks**	
**2014** **(19th)**	Amy Adams	Sydney Prosser	American Hustle	
**2014** **(19th)**	Cate Blanchett	Jeanette "Jasmine" Francis	Blue Jasmine	
**2014** **(19th)**	Jennifer Lawrence	Katniss Everdeen	The Hunger Games: Catching Fire	
**2014** **(19th)**	Sandra Bullock	Dr. Ryan Stone	Gravity	
**2015** **(20th)**	**Rosamund Pike**	**Amy Elliott Dunne**	**Gone Girl**	
**2015** **(20th)**	Alicia Vikander	Ava	Ex Machina	
**2015** **(20th)**	Emily Blunt	Sergeant Rita Vrataski	Edge of Tomorrow	
**2015** **(20th)**	Felicity Jones	Jane Hawking	The Theory of Everything	
**2015** **(20th)**	Keira Knightley	Joan Clarke	The Imitation Game	
**2016** **(21st)**	**Alicia Vikander**	**Gerda Wegener**	**The Danish Girl**	
**2016** **(21st)**	Emily Blunt	Kate Macer	Sicario	
**2016** **(21st)**	Brie Larson	Joy "Ma" Newsome	Room	
**2016** **(21st)**	Jennifer Lawrence	Katniss Everdeen	The Hunger Games: Mockingjay – Part 2	
**2016** **(21st)**	Charlize Theron	Imperator Furiosa	Mad Max: Fury Road	
**2017** **(22nd)**	**Felicity Jones**	**Jyn Erso**	**Rogue One: A Star Wars Story**	
**2017** **(22nd)**	Emma Stone	Mia Dolan	La La Land	
**2017** **(22nd)**	Ruth Negga	Mildred Loving	Loving	
**2017** **(22nd)**	Natalie Portman	Jacqueline "Jackie" Kennedy	Jackie	
**2017** **(22nd)**	Amy Adams	Louise Banks	Arrival	
**2018** **(23rd)**	**Daisy Ridley**	**Rey**	**Star Wars: The Last Jedi**	
**2018** **(23rd)**	Gal Gadot	Diana Prince / Wonder Woman	Wonder Woman	
**2018** **(23rd)**	Frances McDormand	Mildred Hayes	Three Billboards Outside Ebbing, Missouri	
**2018** **(23rd)**	Tiffany Haddish	Dina	Girls Trip	
**2018** **(23rd)**	Emma Watson	Belle	Beauty and the Beast	

== Multiple awards and nominations ==
=== Multiple awards ===
The following individual received two or more Best Actress awards:

Awards	Film
2	Nicole Kidman

=== Multiple nominations ===
The following individuals received two or more Best Actress nominations:

Nominations	Film
5	Cate Blanchett
5	Nicole Kidman
4	Keira Knightley
3	Angelina Jolie
3	Emily Blunt
3	Emma Watson
3	Hilary Swank
3	Jennifer Lawrence
2	Alicia Vikander
2	Amy Adams
2	Carey Mulligan
2	Felicity Jones
2	Frances McDormand
2	Gwyneth Paltrow
2	Helena Bonham Carter
2	Kate Winslet
2	Kirsten Dunst
2	Naomi Watts
2	Natalie Portman
2	Renée Zellweger
2	Uma Thurman
