= Empire Award for Best British Director =

Former annual British film award

Empire Award for British Best Director
- Awarded for: Best film direction by a British director
- Country: United Kingdom
- Presented by: Empire magazine
- First award: 1996
- Final award: 2005
- Currently held by: Matthew Vaughn - Layer Cake (2005)

The Empire Award for Best British Director was an Empire Award presented annually by the British film magazine Empire to honor a British director working within the film industry.

== History ==
The Empire Award for Best British Director was first introduced at the 2nd Empire Awards ceremony in 1997 with Danny Boyle receiving the award for his direction of Trainspotting and last presented as an annual award at the 6th Empire Awards ceremony in 2001 with it returning for a final time at the 10th Empire Awards ceremony in 2005. It was one of three Best British awards retired that year (the others being Best British Actor and Best British Actress). Winners were voted by the readers of Empire magazine.

Since its inception, the award has been given to six directors. Guy Ritchie, Roger Michell and Shane Meadows were nominated on two occasions each, more than any other director. Matthew Vaughn was the last winner in this category for his role in Layer Cake.

== Winners and nominees ==
In the list below, winners are listed first in bold, followed by the other nominees. The number of the ceremony (1st, 2nd, etc.) appears in parentheses after the awards year, linked to the article (if any) on that ceremony.

=== 1990s ===
Year	Director	Film	Ref.
**1997** **(2nd)**	**Danny Boyle**	**Trainspotting**	
**1998** **(3rd)**	**Anthony Minghella**	**The English Patient**	
**1999** **(4th)**	**Peter Howitt**	**Sliding Doors**	
**1999** **(4th)**	Guy Ritchie	Lock, Stock and Two Smoking Barrels	
**1999** **(4th)**	Ken Loach	My Name Is Joe	
**1999** **(4th)**	Nick Hamm	Martha, Meet Frank, Daniel and Laurence	
**1999** **(4th)**	Shane Meadows	Twenty Four Seven	

=== 2000s ===
Year	Director	Film	Ref.
**2000** **(5th)**	**Roger Michell**	**Notting Hill**	
**2000** **(5th)**	Damien O'Donnell	East Is East	
**2000** **(5th)**	John Madden	Shakespeare in Love	
**2000** **(5th)**	Justin Kerrigan	Human Traffic	
**2000** **(5th)**	Mark Herman	Little Voice	
**2001** **(6th)**	**Guy Ritchie**	**Snatch**	
**2001** **(6th)**	Nick Park and Peter Lord	Chicken Run	
**2001** **(6th)**	Ridley Scott	Gladiator	
**2001** **(6th)**	Sam Mendes	American Beauty	
**2001** **(6th)**	Stephen Daldry	Billy Elliot	
**2005** **(10th)**	**Matthew Vaughn**	**Layer Cake**	
**2005** **(10th)**	Edgar Wright	Shaun of the Dead	
**2005** **(10th)**	Paul Greengrass	The Bourne Supremacy	
**2005** **(10th)**	Roger Michell	Enduring Love	
**2005** **(10th)**	Shane Meadows	Dead Man's Shoes	

== Multiple awards and nominations ==
No individual received more than one Best British Director award.

=== Multiple nominations ===
The following individuals received two or more Best British Director nominations:

Nominations	Film
2	Guy Ritchie
2	Roger Michell
2	Shane Meadows
