= Third Empire =

Third Empire may refer to:

- Third Bulgarian Empire, occasionally used to describe the Kingdom of Bulgaria (1908–1946)
- Third German Empire or Third Reich, a common name for Nazi Germany (1933–1945)
  - Das Dritte Reich ("The Third Empire"), a 1923 novel by A. Moeller-Bruck which influenced the Nazi Party
- The Ming Dynasty, also known as the Ming Empire of China, is considered by American scholar Ray Huang to be the "Third Empire of China".
- Third Persian Empire, sometimes used to describe the Sassanid Empire (ca. AD 224–651)
- 3rd Empire Awards, film awards held in 1998

== See also ==
- First Empire (disambiguation)
- Second Empire (disambiguation)
