= 12th Empire Awards =

2007 British film awards ceremony

- The logo for the 12th Empire Awards
- Date: 27 March 2007
- Site: No award ceremony
- Empire issue: 1. 215 (May 2007)

Highlights
- Best Film: Casino Royale
- Best British Film: United 93
- Most awards: Casino Royale (3)
- Most nominations: The Departed (6)

The 12th Empire Awards ceremony (also known as the Empire Readers Awards), presented by the British film magazine Empire, honored the best films of 2006 and took place on 27 March 2007. During the ceremony, Empire presented Empire Awards in 12 categories. The Best Newcomer was split this year into two awards, "Best Male Newcomer" and "Best Female Newcomer" awards. Other changes include Best British Film being renamed this year only to "Sky Movies Best British Film" and the Scene of the Year Award losing the "Sony Ericsson" prefix; The award was presented for the last time. No honorary awards were presented this year. As an exception to previous years, this year had no award ceremony.

Casino Royale won the most awards with three including Best Film. Other winners included Hostel, Little Miss Sunshine, Mission: Impossible III, Pan's Labyrinth, Superman Returns, The Departed, The Prestige, United 93 and Volver with one.

== Winners and nominees ==
Winners are listed first and highlighted in boldface.

| **Best Film**: **Casino Royale**; Pan's Labyrinth; Superman Returns; The Departed; United 93 | **Best British Film**: **United 93**; A Cock and Bull Story; Confetti; Starter for 10; The Queen |
| **Best Director**: **Christopher Nolan — The Prestige**; Bryan Singer — Superman Returns; George Clooney — Good Night, and Good Luck; Guillermo del Toro — Pan's Labyrinth; Martin Scorsese — The Departed | |
| **Best Actor**: **Daniel Craig — Casino Royale**; Christian Bale — The Prestige; Johnny Depp — Pirates of the Caribbean: Dead Man's Chest; Leonardo DiCaprio — The Departed; Sacha Baron Cohen — Borat | **Best Actress**: **Penélope Cruz — Volver**; Helen Mirren — The Queen; Kate Winslet — Little Children; Keira Knightley — Pirates of the Caribbean: Dead Man's Chest; Reese Witherspoon — Walk the Line |
| **Best Comedy**: **Little Miss Sunshine**; A Cock and Bull Story; Borat; Clerks II; Nacho Libre | **Best Horror**: **Hostel**; Slither; The Hills Have Eyes; The Host; The Texas Chainsaw Massacre: The Beginning |
| **Best Sci-Fi/Fantasy**: **Pan's Labyrinth**; Children of Men; Pirates of the Caribbean: Dead Man's Chest; Superman Returns; X-Men: The Last Stand | **Best Thriller**: **The Departed**; Caché; Inside Man; Mission: Impossible III; Munich |
| **Best Male Newcomer**: **Brandon Routh — Superman Returns**; Alex Pettyfer — Stormbreaker; Dominic Cooper — Starter for 10 and The History Boys; Paul Dano — Little Miss Sunshine; Rian Johnson — Brick | **Best Female Newcomer**: **Eva Green — Casino Royale**; Abigail Breslin — Little Miss Sunshine; Elliot Page (Note: Credited as Ellen Page; Hard Candy was released before Page came out as transgender.) — Hard Candy; Rebecca Hall — Starter for 10 and The Prestige; Vera Farmiga — The Departed |
| **Scene of the Year**: **Mission: Impossible III: The bridge attack**; Borat: Borat's naked scrap with Azamat; Brick: The foot chase; Casino Royale: The parkour chase; Children of Men: Attack on the car; Little Miss Sunshine: Olive's dance routine; Pirates of the Caribbean: Dead Man's Chest: The waterwheel sword fight; Superman Returns: The Space Shuttle rescue; The Departed: Frank and Mr. French interrogate Costigan; X-Men: The Last Stand: The Phoenix and Professor X showdown | |

=== Multiple awards ===
The following film received multiple awards:

| Awards | Film |
|---|---|
| 3 | Casino Royale |

=== Multiple nominations ===
The following 15 films received multiple nominations:

| Nominations | Film |
|---|---|
| 6 | The Departed |
| 5 | Superman Returns |
| 4 | Casino Royale |
| 4 | Little Miss Sunshine |
| 4 | Pirates of the Caribbean: Dead Man's Chest |
| 3 | Borat |
| 3 | Starter for 10 |
| 3 | The Prestige |
| 2 | A Cock and Bull Story |
| 2 | Brick |
| 2 | Children of Men |
| 2 | Mission: Impossible III |
| 2 | The Queen |
| 2 | X-Men: The Last Stand |
| 2 | United 93 |
