= Empire Award for Best Film =

Annual British film award

- Awarded for: Best Film of the Year
- Country: United Kingdom
- Presented by: Empire magazine
- First award: 1996
- Currently held by: Star Wars: The Last Jedi (2018)

The Empire Award for Best Film was an Empire Award presented annually by the British film magazine Empire to honor the best film of the previous year.

== History ==
The Empire Award for Best Film was one of five ongoing awards which were first introduced at the 1st Empire Awards ceremony in 1996 (the others being Best Actor, Best Actress, Best Director and Best British Film) with Braveheart receiving the award. Star Wars: The Last Jedi was the most recent winner in this category. Winners were chosen by the readers of Empire magazine.

== Winners and nominees ==
In the list below, winners are listed first in boldface, followed by the other nominees. The number of the ceremony (1st, 2nd, etc.) appears in parentheses after the awards year, linked to the article (if any) on that ceremony.

=== Notes ===
"†" indicates the film won the Academy Award for Best Picture. "≠" indicates the film was nominated in the same category

=== 1990s ===
| Year | Film | Ref. |
|---|---|---|
| **1996** **(1st)** | **Braveheart** † | |
| **1997** **(2nd)** | **Seven** | |
| **1998** **(3rd)** | **Men in Black** | |
| **1999** **(4th)** | **Titanic** † | |
| **1999** **(4th)** | Good Will Hunting ≠ | |
| **1999** **(4th)** | Saving Private Ryan ≠ | |
| **1999** **(4th)** | The Big Lebowski | |
| **1999** **(4th)** | The Truman Show | |

=== 2000s ===
| Year | Film | Ref. |
|---|---|---|
| **2000** **(5th)** | **The Matrix** | |
| **2000** **(5th)** | Austin Powers: The Spy Who Shagged Me | |
| **2000** **(5th)** | Fight Club | |
| **2000** **(5th)** | Notting Hill | |
| **2000** **(5th)** | The Sixth Sense ≠ | |
| **2001** **(6th)** | **Gladiator** † | |
| **2001** **(6th)** | American Beauty † | |
| **2001** **(6th)** | Crouching Tiger, Hidden Dragon ≠ | |
| **2001** **(6th)** | High Fidelity | |
| **2001** **(6th)** | Magnolia | |
| **2002** **(7th)** | **The Lord of the Rings: The Fellowship of the Ring** ≠ | |
| **2002** **(7th)** | A.I. Artificial Intelligence | |
| **2002** **(7th)** | Harry Potter and the Philosopher's Stone | |
| **2002** **(7th)** | Moulin Rouge! ≠ | |
| **2002** **(7th)** | The Others | |
| **2003** **(8th)** | **The Lord of the Rings: The Two Towers** ≠ | |
| **2003** **(8th)** | Die Another Day | |
| **2003** **(8th)** | Minority Report | |
| **2003** **(8th)** | Road to Perdition | |
| **2003** **(8th)** | Spider-Man | |
| **2004** **(9th)** | **The Lord of the Rings: The Return of the King** † | |
| **2004** **(9th)** | Cold Mountain ≠ | |
| **2004** **(9th)** | Kill Bill: Volume 1 | |
| **2004** **(9th)** | Pirates of the Caribbean: The Curse of the Black Pearl | |
| **2004** **(9th)** | X2 | |
| **2005** **(10th)** | **The Bourne Supremacy** | |
| **2005** **(10th)** | Collateral | |
| **2005** **(10th)** | Kill Bill: Volume 2 | |
| **2005** **(10th)** | Spider-Man 2 | |
| **2005** **(10th)** | The Incredibles | |
| **2006** **(11th)** | **King Kong** | |
| **2006** **(11th)** | Crash † | |
| **2006** **(11th)** | Sin City | |
| **2006** **(11th)** | Star Wars: Episode III – Revenge of the Sith | |
| **2006** **(11th)** | War of the Worlds | |
| **2007** **(12th)** | **Casino Royale** | |
| **2007** **(12th)** | Pan's Labyrinth | |
| **2007** **(12th)** | Superman Returns | |
| **2007** **(12th)** | The Departed † | |
| **2007** **(12th)** | United 93 | |
| **2008** **(13th)** | **The Bourne Ultimatum** | |
| **2008** **(13th)** | Harry Potter and the Order of the Phoenix | |
| **2008** **(13th)** | Ratatouille | |
| **2008** **(13th)** | The Assassination of Jesse James by the Coward Robert Ford | |
| **2008** **(13th)** | Zodiac | |
| **2009** **(14th)** | **The Dark Knight** | |
| **2009** **(14th)** | Iron Man | |
| **2009** **(14th)** | No Country For Old Men † | |
| **2009** **(14th)** | There Will Be Blood ≠ | |
| **2009** **(14th)** | WALL-E | |

=== 2010s ===
| Year | Film | Ref. |
|---|---|---|
| **2010** **(15th)** | **Avatar** ≠ | |
| **2010** **(15th)** | District 9 ≠ | |
| **2010** **(15th)** | Inglourious Basterds ≠ | |
| **2010** **(15th)** | Star Trek | |
| **2010** **(15th)** | The Hurt Locker † | |
| **2011** **(16th)** | **Inception** ≠ | |
| **2011** **(16th)** | Kick-Ass | |
| **2011** **(16th)** | Scott Pilgrim vs. the World | |
| **2011** **(16th)** | The King's Speech † | |
| **2011** **(16th)** | The Social Network ≠ | |
| **2012** **(17th)** | **Harry Potter and the Deathly Hallows – Part 2** | |
| **2012** **(17th)** | Drive | |
| **2012** **(17th)** | Rise of the Planet of the Apes | |
| **2012** **(17th)** | The Girl with the Dragon Tattoo | |
| **2012** **(17th)** | Tinker Tailor Soldier Spy ≠ | |
| **2013** **(18th)** | **Skyfall** | |
| **2013** **(18th)** | Django Unchained ≠ | |
| **2013** **(18th)** | The Avengers | |
| **2013** **(18th)** | The Dark Knight Rises | |
| **2013** **(18th)** | The Hobbit: An Unexpected Journey | |
| **2014** **(19th)** | **Gravity** ≠ | |
| **2014** **(19th)** | 12 Years a Slave † | |
| **2014** **(19th)** | Captain Phillips ≠ | |
| **2014** **(19th)** | The Hobbit: The Desolation of Smaug | |
| **2014** **(19th)** | The Hunger Games: Catching Fire | |
| **2015** **(20th)** | **Interstellar** | |
| **2015** **(20th)** | Boyhood ≠ | |
| **2015** **(20th)** | Dawn of the Planet of the Apes | |
| **2015** **(20th)** | The Hobbit: The Battle of the Five Armies | |
| **2015** **(20th)** | The Imitation Game ≠ | |
| **2016** **(21st)** | **The Revenant** ≠ | |
| **2016** **(21st)** | The Hateful Eight ≠ | |
| **2016** **(21st)** | Mad Max: Fury Road ≠ | |
| **2016** **(21st)** | The Martian ≤ | |
| **2016** **(21st)** | Star Wars: The Force Awakens | |
| **2017** **(22nd)** | **Rogue One: A Star Wars Story** | |
| **2017** **(22nd)** | Arrival ≠ | |
| **2017** **(22nd)** | Deadpool | |
| **2017** **(22nd)** | La La Land ≠ | |
| **2017** **(22nd)** | Hunt for the Wilderpeople | |
| **2018** **(23rd)** | **Star Wars: The Last Jedi** | |
| **2018** **(23rd)** | Call Me by Your Name ≠ | |
| **2018** **(23rd)** | Get Out ≠ | |
| **2018** **(23rd)** | Thor: Ragnarok | |
| **2018** **(23rd)** | Wonder Woman | |
