= 9th Empire Awards =

2004 British film awards ceremony

- The logo for the 9th Empire Awards
- Date: 4 February 2004
- Site: The Dorchester Hotel, London, England
- Hosted by: Bill Bailey
- Empire issue: #178 (April 2004)

Highlights
- Best Film: The Lord of the Rings: The Return of the King
- Best British Film: Love Actually
- Most awards: Love Actually and The Lord of the Rings: The Return of the King (3)
- Most nominations: The Lord of the Rings: The Return of the King (8)

Television coverage
- Channel: Sky Movies 1

The 9th Empire Awards ceremony (officially known as the Sony Ericsson Empire Awards), presented by the British film magazine Empire, honored the best films of 2003 and took place on 4 February 2004 at The Dorchester Hotel in London, England. During the ceremony, Empire presented Empire Awards in nine categories as well as three honorary awards. The Lifetime Achievement Award was renamed to Career Achievement Award this year but was reverted to its former name at its next and last presentation. The ceremony was televised live in the United Kingdom by Sky Movies 1 with highlights and exclusive backstage interviews airing on Sky One Mix on 5 February. English actor Bill Bailey hosted the show for the first time. The awards were sponsored by Sony Ericsson for the second consecutive year.

Love Actually and The Lord of the Rings: The Return of the King were tied for most awards won with three awards apiece. Love Actually won the award for Best British Film, while The Lord of the Rings: The Return of the King won the award for Best Film. Other winners included Kill Bill: Volume 1 with two awards and Pirates of the Caribbean: The Curse of the Black Pearl with one. Ray Harryhausen received the Empire Inspiration Award, Sigourney Weaver received the Career Achievement Award and Roger Corman received the Independent Spirit Award.

== Winners and nominees ==
Winners are listed first and highlighted in boldface.

**Best Film**: **The Lord of the Rings: The Return of the King**; Cold Mountain; Kill Bill: Volume 1; Pirates of the Caribbean: The Curse of the Black Pearl; X2	**Best British Film**: **Love Actually**; Bright Young Things; Calendar Girls; Johnny English; Young Adam
**Best Director**: **Quentin Tarantino — Kill Bill: Volume 1**; Anthony Minghella — Cold Mountain; Joel and Ethan Coen — Intolerable Cruelty; Peter Jackson — The Lord of the Rings: The Return of the King; Peter Weir — Master and Commander: The Far Side of the World	
**Best Actor**: **Johnny Depp — Pirates of the Caribbean: The Curse of the Black Pearl**; Daniel Day-Lewis — Gangs of New York; Hugh Jackman — X2; Sean Astin — The Lord of the Rings: The Return of the King; Viggo Mortensen — The Lord of the Rings: The Return of the King	**Best British Actor**: **Andy Serkis — The Lord of the Rings: The Return of the King**; Ewan McGregor — Young Adam; Ian McKellen — The Lord of the Rings: The Return of the King; Jude Law — Cold Mountain; Orlando Bloom — The Lord of the Rings: The Return of the King
**Best Actress**: **Uma Thurman — Kill Bill: Volume 1**; Cate Blanchett — Veronica Guerin; Julianne Moore — Far from Heaven; Maggie Gyllenhaal — Secretary; Nicole Kidman — Cold Mountain	**Best British Actress**: **Emma Thompson — Love Actually**; Emily Mortimer — Young Adam; Helen Mirren — Calendar Girls; Julie Walters — Calendar Girls; Keira Knightley — Pirates of the Caribbean: The Curse of the Black Pearl
**Best Newcomer**: **Martine McCutcheon — Love Actually**; Andrew Lincoln — Love Actually; Eli Roth — Cabin Fever; Fenella Woolgar — Bright Young Things; Mackenzie Crook — Pirates of the Caribbean: The Curse of the Black Pearl	**Sony Ericsson Scene of the Year**: **The Lord of the Rings: The Return of the King: The ride of the Rohirrim**; Gangs of New York: The flag speech; Kill Bill: Volume 1: The House of Blue Leaves; Master and Commander: The Far Side of the World: The opening battle; Pirates of the Caribbean: The Curse of the Black Pearl: The rum scene
**Honorary Awards**: Empire Inspiration Award: **Ray Harryhausen**; Career Achievement Award: **Sigourney Weaver**; Independent Spirit Award: **Roger Corman**	

=== Multiple awards ===
The following three films received multiple awards:

Awards	Film
3	Love Actually
3	The Lord of the Rings: The Return of the King
2	Kill Bill: Volume 1

=== Multiple nominations ===
The following 11 films received multiple nominations:

Nominations	Film
8	The Lord of the Rings: The Return of the King
5	Pirates of the Caribbean: The Curse of the Black Pearl
4	Cold Mountain
4	Kill Bill: Volume 1
4	Love Actually
3	Calendar Girls
3	Young Adam
2	Bright Young Things
2	Gangs of New York
2	Master and Commander: The Far Side of the World
2	X2
