= First Empire =

First Empire may refer to:

- First British Empire, sometimes used to describe the British Empire between 1583 and 1783
- First Bulgarian Empire (680–1018)
- First French Empire (1804–1814/1815)
- First German Empire or "First Reich", sometimes used to describe the Holy Roman Empire (962–1806)
- First Empire of Haiti (1804–1806)
- First Mexican Empire (1821–1823)
- First Persian Empire, sometimes used to describe the Achaemenid Empire (ca. 550 BCE – 336 BCE)
- 1st Empire Awards, film awards held in 1996
- Galactic Empire, when first established by Palpatine

== See also ==
- Second Empire (disambiguation)
- Third Empire (disambiguation)
