= Empire Award for Best British Actor =

Former annual British film award

- Awarded for: Best performance by a British actor in a leading role
- Country: United Kingdom
- Presented by: Empire magazine
- First award: 1996
- Final award: 2005
- Currently held by: Paddy Considine - Dead Man's Shoes (2005)

The Empire Award for Best British Actor was an Empire Award presented annually by the British film magazine Empire to honor a British actor who has delivered an outstanding performance in a leading role while working within the film industry. The Empire Award for Best British Actor was first introduced at the 1st Empire Awards ceremony in 1996 with Ewan McGregor receiving the award for his role in Shallow Grave and last presented at the 10th Empire Awards ceremony in 2005. It was one of three Best British awards retired that year (the others being Best British Actress and Best British Director). Winners were voted by the readers of Empire magazine.

Since its inception, the award has been given to six actors. Ewan McGregor had received the most awards in this category with four awards and was nominated on seven occasions, more than any other actor. Paddy Considine was the last winner in this category for his role in Dead Man's Shoes.

== Winners and nominees ==
In the list below, winners are listed first in boldface, followed by the other nominees. The number of the ceremony (1st, 2nd, etc.) appears in parentheses after the awards year, linked to the article (if any) on that ceremony.

=== 1990s ===
Year	Actor	Film	Ref.
**1996** **(1st)**	**Ewan McGregor**	**Shallow Grave**	
**1997** **(2nd)**	**Ewan McGregor**	**Trainspotting**	
**1998** **(3rd)**	**Ewan McGregor**	**A Life Less Ordinary**	
**1999** **(4th)**	**Peter Mullan**	**My Name Is Joe**	
**1999** **(4th)**	Bob Hoskins	Twenty Four Seven	
**1999** **(4th)**	Ewan McGregor	Velvet Goldmine	
**1999** **(4th)**	Gary Oldman	Lost in Space	
**1999** **(4th)**	Joseph Fiennes	Elizabeth	

=== 2000s ===
Year	Actor	Film	Ref.
**2000** **(5th)**	**Hugh Grant**	**Notting Hill**	
**2000** **(5th)**	Ewan McGregor	Star Wars: Episode I – The Phantom Menace	
**2000** **(5th)**	Ian McKellen	Gods and Monsters	
**2000** **(5th)**	Joseph Fiennes	Shakespeare in Love	
**2000** **(5th)**	Rhys Ifans	Notting Hill	
**2001** **(6th)**	**Vinnie Jones**	**Snatch**	
**2001** **(6th)**	Christian Bale	American Psycho	
**2001** **(6th)**	Jude Law	The Talented Mr. Ripley	
**2001** **(6th)**	Michael Caine	The Cider House Rules	
**2001** **(6th)**	Robert Carlyle	Angela’s Ashes	
**2002** **(7th)**	**Ewan McGregor**	**Moulin Rouge!**	
**2002** **(7th)**	Hugh Grant	Bridget Jones's Diary	
**2002** **(7th)**	Ian McKellen	The Lord of the Rings: The Fellowship of the Ring	
**2002** **(7th)**	Sean Bean	The Lord of the Rings: The Fellowship of the Ring	
**2002** **(7th)**	Tim Roth	Planet of the Apes	
**2003** **(8th)**	**Hugh Grant**	**About a Boy**	
**2003** **(8th)**	Andy Serkis	The Lord of the Rings: The Two Towers	
**2003** **(8th)**	Ian McKellen	The Lord of the Rings: The Two Towers	
**2003** **(8th)**	Jude Law	Road to Perdition	
**2003** **(8th)**	Steve Coogan	24 Hour Party People	
**2004** **(9th)**	**Andy Serkis**	**The Lord of the Rings: The Return of the King**	
**2004** **(9th)**	Ewan McGregor	Young Adam	
**2004** **(9th)**	Ian McKellen	The Lord of the Rings: The Return of the King	
**2004** **(9th)**	Jude Law	Cold Mountain	
**2004** **(9th)**	Orlando Bloom	The Lord of the Rings: The Return of the King	
**2005** **(10th)**	**Paddy Considine**	**Dead Man's Shoes**	
**2005** **(10th)**	Daniel Craig	Layer Cake	
**2005** **(10th)**	Paul Bettany	Wimbledon	
**2005** **(10th)**	Rhys Ifans	Enduring Love	
**2005** **(10th)**	Simon Pegg	Shaun of the Dead	

== Multiple awards and nominations ==
=== Multiple awards ===
The following individuals received two or more Best British Actor awards:

Awards	Film
4	Ewan McGregor
2	Hugh Grant

=== Multiple nominations ===
The following individuals received two or more Best British Actor nominations:

Nominations	Film
7	Ewan McGregor
4	Ian McKellen
3	Hugh Grant
3	Jude Law
2	Andy Serkis
2	Joseph Fiennes
2	Rhys Ifans
