= 7th Empire Awards =

2002 British film awards ceremony

- The logo for the 7th Empire Awards
- Date: 5 February 2002
- Site: The Dorchester Hotel, London, England
- Hosted by: Phill Jupitus
- Empire issue: #154 (April 2002)

Highlights
- Best Film: The Lord of the Rings: The Fellowship of the Ring
- Best British Film: Bridget Jones's Diary
- Most awards: Moulin Rouge! and The Lord of the Rings: The Fellowship of the Ring (3)
- Most nominations: The Lord of the Rings: The Fellowship of the Ring (8)

The 7th Empire Awards ceremony, presented by the British film magazine Empire, honored the best films of 2001 and took place on 5 February 2002 at The Dorchester Hotel in London, England. During the ceremony, Empire presented Empire Awards in eight categories as well as three honorary awards. The honorary Independent Spirit Award was first introduced this year. English comedian Phill Jupitus hosted the show for the first time.

The Lord of the Rings: The Fellowship of the Ring and Moulin Rouge! were tied for most awards won with three awards apiece. The Lord of the Rings: The Fellowship of the Ring won the award for Best Film, while Moulin Rouge! won the award for Best Director for Baz Luhrmann. Other winners included Bridget Jones's Diary who won the award for Best British Film and Enigma with one award apiece. Michael Mann received the Empire Inspiration Award, Christopher Lee received the Lifetime Achievement Award and Alejandro Amenábar received the Independent Spirit Award for The Others.

== Winners and nominees ==
Winners are listed first and highlighted in boldface.

**Best Film**: **The Lord of the Rings: The Fellowship of the Ring**; A.I. Artificial Intelligence; Harry Potter and the Philosopher's Stone; Moulin Rouge!; The Others	**Best British Film**: **Bridget Jones's Diary**; Enigma; Lucky Break; Mike Bassett: England Manager; The Parole Officer
**Best Director**: **Baz Luhrmann — Moulin Rouge!**; Cameron Crowe — Almost Famous; Peter Jackson — The Lord of the Rings: The Fellowship of the Ring; Steven Soderbergh — Traffic; Steven Spielberg — A.I. Artificial Intelligence	
**Best Actor**: **Elijah Wood — The Lord of the Rings: The Fellowship of the Ring**; Benicio del Toro — Traffic; Billy Bob Thornton — The Man Who Wasn't There; Haley Joel Osment — A.I. Artificial Intelligence; Viggo Mortensen — The Lord of the Rings: The Fellowship of the Ring	**Best British Actor**: **Ewan McGregor — Moulin Rouge!**; Hugh Grant — Bridget Jones's Diary; Ian McKellen — The Lord of the Rings: The Fellowship of the Ring; Sean Bean — The Lord of the Rings: The Fellowship of the Ring; Tim Roth — Planet of the Apes
**Best Actress**: **Nicole Kidman — Moulin Rouge!**; Audrey Tautou — Amélie; Frances O'Connor — A.I. Artificial Intelligence; Nicole Kidman — The Others; Renée Zellweger — Bridget Jones's Diary	**Best British Actress**: **Kate Winslet — Enigma**; Catherine Zeta-Jones — Traffic; Helena Bonham Carter — Planet of the Apes; Olivia Williams — Lucky Break; Rachel Weisz — The Mummy Returns
**Best Debut**: **Orlando Bloom — The Lord of the Rings: The Fellowship of the Ring**; Billy Boyd and Dominic Monaghan — The Lord of the Rings: The Fellowship of the Ring; Daniel Radcliffe, Rupert Grint and Emma Watson — Harry Potter and the Philosopher's Stone; Keira Knightley — The Hole; Sharon Maguire — Bridget Jones's Diary	**Honorary Awards**: Empire Inspiration Award: **Michael Mann**; Lifetime Achievement Award: **Christopher Lee**; Independent Spirit Award: **Alejandro Amenábar — The Others**; Alejandro González Iñárritu — Amores perros; Jean-Pierre Jeunet — Amélie; Terry Zwigoff — Ghost World

=== Multiple awards ===
The following two films received multiple awards:

Awards	Film
3	Moulin Rouge!
3	The Lord of the Rings: The Fellowship of the Ring

=== Multiple nominations ===
The following 11 films received multiple nominations:

Nominations	Film
8	The Lord of the Rings: The Fellowship of the Ring
4	A.I. Artificial Intelligence
4	Bridget Jones's Diary
4	Moulin Rouge!
3	The Others
3	Traffic
2	Amélie
2	Enigma
2	Harry Potter and the Philosopher's Stone
2	Lucky Break
2	Planet of the Apes
