= Empire Award for Best British Film =

Former annual British film award

- Awarded for: Best British film of the year
- Country: United Kingdom
- Presented by: Empire magazine
- First award: 1996
- Currently held by: God's Own Country (2018)

The Empire Award for Best British Film was an Empire Award presented annually by the British film magazine Empire to honour the best British film of the previous year. The Empire Award for Best British Film was one of five ongoing awards which were first introduced at the 1st Empire Awards ceremony in 1996 (the others being Best Actor, Best Actress, Best Director and Best Film) with Shallow Grave receiving the award. God's Own Country was the most recent winner in this category. Winners were chosen by the readers of Empire magazine.

== Winners and nominees ==
In the list below, winners are listed first in boldface, followed by the other nominees. The number of the ceremony (1st, 2nd, etc.) appears in parentheses after the awards year, linked to the article (if any) on that ceremony.

=== 1990s ===
Year	Film	Ref.
**1996** **(1st)**	**Shallow Grave**	
**1997** **(2nd)**	**Trainspotting**	
**1998** **(3rd)**	**The Full Monty**	
**1999** **(4th)**	**Lock, Stock and Two Smoking Barrels**	
**1999** **(4th)**	Elizabeth	
**1999** **(4th)**	My Name Is Joe	
**1999** **(4th)**	Sliding Doors	
**1999** **(4th)**	Twenty Four Seven	

=== 2000s ===
Year	Film	Ref.
**2000** **(5th)**	**Notting Hill**	
**2000** **(5th)**	East Is East	
**2000** **(5th)**	Human Traffic	
**2000** **(5th)**	Little Voice	
**2000** **(5th)**	Shakespeare in Love	
**2001** **(6th)**	**Billy Elliot**	
**2001** **(6th)**	Angela’s Ashes	
**2001** **(6th)**	Chicken Run	
**2001** **(6th)**	Snatch	
**2001** **(6th)**	Topsy-Turvy	
**2002** **(7th)**	**Bridget Jones's Diary**	
**2002** **(7th)**	Enigma	
**2002** **(7th)**	Lucky Break	
**2002** **(7th)**	Mike Bassett: England Manager	
**2002** **(7th)**	The Parole Officer	
**2003** **(8th)**	**28 Days Later**	(Note: The official name of the award at the 8th Empire Awards in 2003 was "Sky Movies Best British Film".)
**2003** **(8th)**	24 Hour Party People	(Note: The official name of the award at the 8th Empire Awards in 2003 was "Sky Movies Best British Film".)
**2003** **(8th)**	About a Boy	(Note: The official name of the award at the 8th Empire Awards in 2003 was "Sky Movies Best British Film".)
**2003** **(8th)**	Bend It Like Beckham	(Note: The official name of the award at the 8th Empire Awards in 2003 was "Sky Movies Best British Film".)
**2003** **(8th)**	The Guru	(Note: The official name of the award at the 8th Empire Awards in 2003 was "Sky Movies Best British Film".)
**2004** **(9th)**	**Love Actually**	
**2004** **(9th)**	Bright Young Things	
**2004** **(9th)**	Calendar Girls	
**2004** **(9th)**	Johnny English	
**2004** **(9th)**	Young Adam	
**2005** **(10th)**	**Shaun of the Dead**	
**2005** **(10th)**	Bridget Jones: The Edge of Reason	
**2005** **(10th)**	Dead Man's Shoes	
**2005** **(10th)**	Enduring Love	
**2005** **(10th)**	Layer Cake	
**2006** **(11th)**	**Pride & Prejudice**	(Note: The 11th Empire Awards in 2006 had six nominees (instead of the usual five) for Best British Film.)
**2006** **(11th)**	Harry Potter and the Goblet of Fire	(Note: The 11th Empire Awards in 2006 had six nominees (instead of the usual five) for Best British Film.)
**2006** **(11th)**	Stoned	(Note: The 11th Empire Awards in 2006 had six nominees (instead of the usual five) for Best British Film.)
**2006** **(11th)**	The Descent	(Note: The 11th Empire Awards in 2006 had six nominees (instead of the usual five) for Best British Film.)
**2006** **(11th)**	The Hitchhiker's Guide to the Galaxy	(Note: The 11th Empire Awards in 2006 had six nominees (instead of the usual five) for Best British Film.)
**2006** **(11th)**	Wallace & Gromit: The Curse of the Were-Rabbit	(Note: The 11th Empire Awards in 2006 had six nominees (instead of the usual five) for Best British Film.)
**2007** **(12th)**	**United 93**	
**2007** **(12th)**	A Cock and Bull Story	
**2007** **(12th)**	Confetti	
**2007** **(12th)**	Starter for 10	
**2007** **(12th)**	The Queen	
**2008** **(13th)**	**Atonement**	
**2008** **(13th)**	Control	
**2008** **(13th)**	Hot Fuzz	
**2008** **(13th)**	Sunshine	
**2008** **(13th)**	This Is England	
**2009** **(14th)**	**RocknRolla**	
**2009** **(14th)**	Eden Lake	
**2009** **(14th)**	Hunger	
**2009** **(14th)**	In Bruges	
**2009** **(14th)**	Son of Rambow	

=== 2010s ===
Year	Film	Ref.
**2010** **(15th)**	**Harry Brown**	
**2010** **(15th)**	An Education	
**2010** **(15th)**	In the Loop	
**2010** **(15th)**	Nowhere Boy	
**2010** **(15th)**	The Imaginarium of Doctor Parnassus	
**2011** **(16th)**	**Kick-Ass**	
**2011** **(16th)**	127 Hours	
**2011** **(16th)**	Four Lions	
**2011** **(16th)**	Monsters	
**2011** **(16th)**	The King's Speech	
**2012** **(17th)**	**Tinker Tailor Soldier Spy**	
**2012** **(17th)**	Attack the Block	
**2012** **(17th)**	Submarine	
**2012** **(17th)**	The Inbetweeners Movie	
**2012** **(17th)**	Tyrannosaur	
**2013** **(18th)**	**Sightseers**	
**2013** **(18th)**	Dredd	
**2013** **(18th)**	Les Misérables	
**2013** **(18th)**	Skyfall	
**2013** **(18th)**	The Woman in Black	
**2014** **(19th)**	**The World's End**	
**2014** **(19th)**	Alan Partridge: Alpha Papa	
**2014** **(19th)**	Filth	
**2014** **(19th)**	Rush	
**2014** **(19th)**	Sunshine on Leith	
**2015** **(20th)**	**Kingsman: The Secret Service**	
**2015** **(20th)**	Paddington	
**2015** **(20th)**	The Imitation Game	
**2015** **(20th)**	The Theory of Everything	
**2015** **(20th)**	Under the Skin	
**2016** **(21st)**	**Spectre**	
**2016** **(21st)**	45 Years	
**2016** **(21st)**	Legend	
**2016** **(21st)**	Macbeth	
**2016** **(21st)**	Suffragette	
**2017** **(22nd)**	**I, Daniel Blake**	
**2017** **(22nd)**	Eddie the Eagle	
**2017** **(22nd)**	Fantastic Beasts and Where to Find Them	
**2017** **(22nd)**	High-Rise	
**2017** **(22nd)**	The Girl with All the Gifts	
**2018** **(23rd)**	**God's Own Country**	
**2018** **(23rd)**	The Death of Stalin	
**2018** **(23rd)**	Dunkirk	
**2018** **(23rd)**	Darkest Hour	
**2018** **(23rd)**	Paddington 2	
