= Empire Award for Best Soundtrack =

Former annual British film award

- Awarded for: Best film soundtrack
- Country: United Kingdom
- Presented by: Empire magazine
- First award: 2008
- Currently held by: Baby Driver (2018)

The Empire Award for Best Soundtrack was an Empire Award presented annually by the British film magazine Empire to honor the best film soundtrack of the previous year. The Empire Award for Best Soundtrack was first introduced at the 13th Empire Awards ceremony in 2008 with the soundtrack from Control receiving the award and last presented at the 14th Empire Awards ceremony in 2009 with the soundtrack from Mamma Mia! receiving the award. The category was revived in 2016 when the Mad Max: Fury Road soundtrack received the award. The current winner of the award is the soundtrack from Baby Driver. Winners were voted by the readers of Empire magazine.

== Winners and nominees ==
In the list below, winners are listed first in boldface, followed by the other nominees. The number of the ceremony (1st, 2nd, etc.) appears in parentheses after the awards year, linked to the article (if any) on that ceremony.

=== 2000s ===
Year	Film	Ref.
**2008** **(13th)**	**Control**	
**2008** **(13th)**	Atonement	
**2008** **(13th)**	Hairspray	
**2008** **(13th)**	Harry Potter and the Order of the Phoenix	
**2008** **(13th)**	Once	
**2009** **(14th)**	**Mamma Mia!**	
**2009** **(14th)**	Quantum of Solace	
**2009** **(14th)**	RocknRolla	
**2009** **(14th)**	Sweeney Todd: The Demon Barber of Fleet Street	
**2009** **(14th)**	There Will Be Blood	

=== 2010s ===
Year	Film	Ref.
**2016** **(21st)**	**Mad Max: Fury Road**	
**2016** **(21st)**	The Hateful Eight	
**2016** **(21st)**	The Martian	
**2016** **(21st)**	Sicario	
**2016** **(21st)**	Straight Outta Compton	
**2017** **(22nd)**	**La La Land**	
**2017** **(22nd)**	Arrival	
**2017** **(22nd)**	The Greasy Strangler	
**2017** **(22nd)**	Moana	
**2017** **(22nd)**	Sing Street	
**2018** **(23rd)**	**Baby Driver**	
**2018** **(23rd)**	Beauty and the Beast	
**2018** **(23rd)**	Call Me by Your Name	
**2018** **(23rd)**	Guardians of the Galaxy Vol. 2	
**2018** **(23rd)**	Logan Lucky	
