= Empire Icon Award =

Former annual British film award

The Empire Icon Award is an honorary Empire Award presented by the British film magazine Empire. The Empire Icon Award was first introduced at the 11th Empire Awards ceremony in 2006 with Brian Cox receiving the award. The award was absent from the 12th, 17th and 18th Empire Awards ceremonies. Mark Hamill is the most recent winner in this category.

== Winners ==
In the list below, winners are listed first in boldface. The number of the ceremony (1st, 2nd, etc.) appears in parentheses after the awards year, linked to the article (if any) on that ceremony.

=== 2000s ===
Year	Winner	Ref.
**2006** **(11th)**	**Brian Cox**	
**2008** **(13th)**	**Ewan McGregor**	
**2009** **(14th)**	**Viggo Mortensen**	

=== 2010s ===
Year	Winner	Ref.
**2010** **(15th)**	**Ian McKellen**	
**2011** **(16th)**	**Gary Oldman**	
**2014** **(19th)**	**Hugh Jackman**	
**2018** **(23rd)**	**Mark Hamill**	
