= Empire Award for Best Newcomer =

Former annual British film award

- Awarded for: Best breakthrough film by a director or best breakthrough performance by an actor and actress
- Country: United Kingdom
- Presented by: Empire magazine
- First award: 1996
- Final award: 2011
- Currently held by: Chloë Grace Moretz - Kick-Ass and Let Me In (2011)

The Empire Award for Best Newcomer (formerly known as Best Debut) was an Empire Award presented annually by the British film magazine Empire to honor a director with a breakthrough film or an actor who has delivered a breakthrough performance while working within the film industry. The Empire Award for Best Newcomer was first introduced at the 1st Empire Awards ceremony in 1996 with Bryan Singer receiving the award for his direction of The Usual Suspects and last presented at the 16th Empire Awards ceremony in 2011. Winners were voted by the readers of Empire magazine.

Since its inception, the award has been given to two male directors, eight actors, seven actresses and one film crew. Gemma Arterton was the only individual to be nominated two times, at the 13th and 14th Empire Awards ceremonies in 2008 and 2009 respectively. Twice two awards were handed out at the same year. The first time was at the 5th Empire Awards ceremony in 2000 where there was a tie between Carrie-Anne Moss and the crew of East Is East and the second time was at the 12th Empire Awards ceremony in 2007 where the award was split to Best Male and Best Female newcomers. Chloë Grace Moretz was the last winner in this category for her roles in Kick-Ass and Let Me In.

== Award history ==
The award was named "Best Debut" between the 1st Empire Awards in 1996 and the 7th Empire Awards in 2002 and was changed to "Best Newcomer". In 2000, 2007 and 2012, the category was split to "Best Male Newcomer" and "Best Female Newcomer".

== Winners and nominees ==
In the list below, winners are listed first in boldface, followed by the other nominees. The number of the ceremony (1st, 2nd, etc.) appears in parentheses after the awards year, linked to the article (if any) on that ceremony.

=== 1990s ===
Year	Actor	Film	Ref.
**1996** **(1st)**	**Bryan Singer**	**The Usual Suspects**	
**1997** **(2nd)**	**Ewen Bremner**	**Trainspotting**	
**1998** **(3rd)**	**Gary Oldman**	**Nil by Mouth**	
**1999** **(4th)**	**Vinnie Jones**	**Lock, Stock and Two Smoking Barrels**	
**1999** **(4th)**	Cate Blanchett	Elizabeth	
**1999** **(4th)**	Charlize Theron	The Devil's Advocate	
**1999** **(4th)**	Denise Richards	Starship Troopers	
**1999** **(4th)**	Shane Meadows	Twenty Four Seven	

=== 2000s ===
Year	Actor	Film	Ref.
**2000** **(5th)**	**Carrie-Anne Moss**	**The Matrix**	
**2000** **(5th)**	**The crew of**	**East Is East**	
**2000** **(5th)**	Eduardo Sánchez and Daniel Myrick	The Blair Witch Project	
**2000** **(5th)**	Haley Joel Osment	The Sixth Sense	
**2000** **(5th)**	Jewel	Ride with the Devil	
**2000** **(5th)**	Tim Roth	The War Zone	
**2001** **(6th)**	**Jamie Bell**	**Billy Elliot**	
**2001** **(6th)**	Nick Park and Peter Lord	Chicken Run	
**2001** **(6th)**	Sam Mendes	American Beauty	
**2001** **(6th)**	Sofia Coppola	The Virgin Suicides	
**2001** **(6th)**	Spike Jonze	Being John Malkovich	
**2002** **(7th)**	**Orlando Bloom**	**The Lord of the Rings: The Fellowship of the Ring**	
**2002** **(7th)**	Billy Boyd and Dominic Monaghan	The Lord of the Rings: The Fellowship of the Ring	
**2002** **(7th)**	Daniel Radcliffe, Rupert Grint and Emma Watson	Harry Potter and the Philosopher's Stone	
**2002** **(7th)**	Keira Knightley	The Hole	
**2002** **(7th)**	Sharon Maguire	Bridget Jones's Diary	
**2003** **(8th)**	**Rosamund Pike**	**Die Another Day**	
**2003** **(8th)**	Cillian Murphy	28 Days Later	
**2003** **(8th)**	Neil Marshall	Dog Soldiers	
**2003** **(8th)**	Martin Compston	Sweet Sixteen	
**2003** **(8th)**	Parminder Nagra	Bend It Like Beckham	
**2004** **(9th)**	**Martine McCutcheon**	**Love Actually**	
**2004** **(9th)**	Andrew Lincoln	Love Actually	
**2004** **(9th)**	Eli Roth	Cabin Fever	
**2004** **(9th)**	Fenella Woolgar	Bright Young Things	
**2004** **(9th)**	Mackenzie Crook	Pirates of the Caribbean: The Curse of the Black Pearl	
**2005** **(10th)**	**Freddie Highmore**	**Finding Neverland**	
**2005** **(10th)**	Bryce Dallas Howard	The Village	
**2005** **(10th)**	Matthew Vaughn	Layer Cake	
**2005** **(10th)**	Sienna Miller	Alfie and Layer Cake	
**2005** **(10th)**	Zach Braff	Garden State	
**2006** **(11th)**	**Kelly Reilly**	**Mrs Henderson Presents**	
**2006** **(11th)**	Georgie Henley	The Chronicles of Narnia: The Lion, the Witch and the Wardrobe	
**2006** **(11th)**	James McAvoy	The Chronicles of Narnia: The Lion, the Witch and the Wardrobe	
**2006** **(11th)**	Leo Gregory	Stoned	
**2006** **(11th)**	Nathan Fillion	Serenity	
**2007** **(12th)**	**Brandon Routh**	**Superman Returns**	
**2007** **(12th)**	Alex Pettyfer	Stormbreaker	
**2007** **(12th)**	Dominic Cooper	Starter for 10 and The History Boys	
**2007** **(12th)**	Paul Dano	Little Miss Sunshine	
**2007** **(12th)**	Rian Johnson	Brick	
**2007** **(12th)**	**Eva Green**	**Casino Royale**	
**2007** **(12th)**	Abigail Breslin	Little Miss Sunshine	
**2007** **(12th)**	Elliot Page	Hard Candy	
**2007** **(12th)**	Rebecca Hall	Starter for 10 and The Prestige	
**2007** **(12th)**	Vera Farmiga	The Departed	
**2008** **(13th)**	**Sam Riley**	**Control**	
**2008** **(13th)**	Gemma Arterton	St Trinian's	
**2008** **(13th)**	Saoirse Ronan	Atonement	
**2008** **(13th)**	Shia LaBeouf	Transformers	
**2008** **(13th)**	Thomas Turgoose	This Is England	
**2009** **(14th)**	**Gemma Arterton**		
**2009** **(14th)**	Hayley Atwell		
**2009** **(14th)**	Jim Sturgess		
**2009** **(14th)**	Robert Pattinson		
**2009** **(14th)**	Toby Kebbell		

=== 2010s ===
Year	Actor	Film	Ref.
**2010** **(15th)**	**Aaron Johnson**	**Nowhere Boy**	
**2010** **(15th)**	Anna Kendrick	The Twilight Saga: New Moon and Up in the Air	
**2010** **(15th)**	Carey Mulligan	An Education	
**2010** **(15th)**	Katie Jarvis	Fish Tank	
**2010** **(15th)**	Sharlto Copley	District 9	
**2011** **(16th)**	**Chloë Grace Moretz**	**Kick-Ass and Let Me In**	
**2011** **(16th)**	Gareth Edwards	Monsters	
**2011** **(16th)**	Jaden Smith	The Karate Kid	
**2011** **(16th)**	Jennifer Lawrence	Winter's Bone	
**2011** **(16th)**	Mia Wasikowska	Alice in Wonderland	

== Gender and role superlatives ==
Role	Wins	Nominations
Male Directors	2	14 (+2) (Note: Twice a team of two directors have been nominated for the award.)
Female Directors	0	2
Actors	8	26
Actresses	7	29
Groups	1	3 (Note: The nominations for the cast of East Is East, The Lord of the Rings: The Fellowship of the Ring and Harry Potter and the Philosopher's Stone are counted as group nominations.)
