= 4th Empire Awards =

1999 Annual British film awards ceremony

- The logo for the 4th Empire Awards
- Date: 1999
- Site: Park Lane Hotel, London, England
- Empire issue: #119 (May 1999)

Highlights
- Best Film: Titanic
- Best British Film: Lock, Stock and Two Smoking Barrels
- Most awards: Lock, Stock and Two Smoking Barrels, Saving Private Ryan and Titanic (2)
- Most nominations: Elizabeth and Twenty Four Seven (4)

The 4th Empire Awards ceremony, presented by the British film magazine Empire, honored the best films of 1998 and took place in 1999 at the Park Lane Hotel in London, England. During the ceremony, Empire presented Empire Awards in nine categories as well as three honorary awards. The honorary Movie Masterpiece award was first introduced this year. The awards were sponsored by Stella Artois for the second consecutive year.

Lock, Stock and Two Smoking Barrels, Titanic and Saving Private Ryan were tied for most awards won with two awards apiece. Lock, Stock and Two Smoking Barrels won the award for Best British Film, while Titanic won the award for Best Film. Other winners included Elizabeth, My Name Is Joe and Sliding Doors with one award apiece. Spike Lee received the Empire Inspiration Award, Freddie Francis received the Lifetime Achievement Award and William Friedkin received the Movie Masterpiece Award for The Exorcist.

== Winners and nominees ==
Winners are listed first and highlighted in boldface.

**Best Film**: **Titanic**; Good Will Hunting; Saving Private Ryan; The Big Lebowski; The Truman Show	**Best British Film**: **Lock, Stock and Two Smoking Barrels**; Elizabeth; My Name Is Joe; Sliding Doors; Twenty Four Seven
**Best Director**: **Steven Spielberg — Saving Private Ryan**; Ang Lee — The Ice Storm; James Cameron — Titanic; Peter Weir — The Truman Show; Steven Soderbergh — Out of Sight	**Best British Director**: **Peter Howitt — Sliding Doors**; Guy Ritchie — Lock, Stock and Two Smoking Barrels; Ken Loach — My Name Is Joe; Nick Hamm — Martha, Meet Frank, Daniel and Laurence; Shane Meadows — Twenty Four Seven
**Best Actor**: **Tom Hanks — Saving Private Ryan**; Jeff Bridges — The Big Lebowski; Jim Carrey — The Truman Show; Matt Damon — Good Will Hunting; Samuel L. Jackson — Jackie Brown	**Best British Actor**: **Peter Mullan — My Name Is Joe**; Bob Hoskins — Twenty Four Seven; Ewan McGregor — Velvet Goldmine; Gary Oldman — Lost in Space; Joseph Fiennes — Elizabeth
**Best Actress**: **Cate Blanchett — Elizabeth**; Gwyneth Paltrow — Sliding Doors; Helen Hunt — As Good as It Gets; Jennifer Lopez — Out of Sight; Pam Grier — Jackie Brown	**Best British Actress**: **Kate Winslet — Titanic**; Anna Friel — The Land Girls; Catherine Zeta-Jones — The Mask of Zorro; Emily Watson — The Boxer; Minnie Driver — Good Will Hunting
**Best Debut**: **Vinnie Jones — Lock, Stock and Two Smoking Barrels**; Cate Blanchett — Elizabeth; Charlize Theron — The Devil's Advocate; Denise Richards — Starship Troopers; Shane Meadows — Twenty Four Seven	**Honorary Awards**: Empire Inspiration Award: **Spike Lee**; Lifetime Achievement Award: **Bob Hoskins**; Movie Masterpiece Award: **William Friedkin — The Exorcist**

=== Multiple awards ===
The following three films received multiple awards:

Awards	Film
2	Lock, Stock and Two Smoking Barrels
2	Saving Private Ryan
2	Titanic

=== Multiple nominations ===
The following 12 films received multiple nominations:

Nominations	Film
4	Elizabeth
4	Twenty Four Seven
3	Good Will Hunting
3	Lock, Stock and Two Smoking Barrels
3	My Name Is Joe
3	Saving Private Ryan
3	Sliding Doors
3	The Truman Show
3	Titanic
2	Jackie Brown
2	Out of Sight
2	The Big Lebowski
