= 8th Empire Awards =

2003 British film awards ceremony

- The logo for the 8th Empire Awards
- Date: 5 February 2003
- Site: The Dorchester Hotel, London, England
- Hosted by: Richard E. Grant
- Empire issue: #166 (April 2003)

Highlights
- Best Film: The Lord of the Rings: The Two Towers
- Best British Film: 28 Days Later
- Most awards: Minority Report (3)
- Most nominations: The Lord of the Rings: The Two Towers (7)

The 8th Empire Awards ceremony (officially known as the Sony Ericsson Empire Awards), presented by the British film magazine Empire, honored the best films of 2002 and took place on 5 February 2003 at The Dorchester Hotel in London, England. During the ceremony, Empire presented Empire Awards in nine categories as well as two honorary awards. The award for Sony Ericsson Scene of the Year was first introduced this year. The Best Debut award was renamed to "Best Newcomer". British actor Richard E. Grant hosted the show for the first time. The awards were sponsored by Sony Ericsson for the first time.

Minority Report won the most awards with three including Best Director for Steven Spielberg. Other winners included 28 Days Later, About a Boy, Die Another Day, Spider-Man, Star Wars: Episode II – Attack of the Clones and The Lord of the Rings: The Two Towers with one. Dustin Hoffman received the Lifetime Achievement Award and Michael Winterbottom and Andrew Eaton received the Independent Spirit Award for their role in the direction and production of 24 Hour Party People.

== Winners and nominees ==
Winners are listed first and highlighted in boldface.

**Best Film**: **The Lord of the Rings: The Two Towers**; Die Another Day; Minority Report; Road to Perdition; Spider-Man	**Best British Film**: **28 Days Later**; 24 Hour Party People; About a Boy; Bend It Like Beckham; The Guru
**Best Director**: **Steven Spielberg — Minority Report**; M. Night Shyamalan — Signs; Peter Jackson — The Lord of the Rings: The Two Towers; Sam Raimi — Spider-Man; Steven Soderbergh — Ocean's Eleven	
**Best Actor**: **Tom Cruise — Minority Report**; Colin Farrell — Minority Report; Mike Myers — Austin Powers in Goldmember; Tom Hanks — Road to Perdition; Viggo Mortensen — The Lord of the Rings: The Two Towers	**Best British Actor**: **Hugh Grant — About a Boy**; Andy Serkis — The Lord of the Rings: The Two Towers; Ian McKellen — The Lord of the Rings: The Two Towers; Jude Law — Road to Perdition; Steve Coogan — 24 Hour Party People
**Best Actress**: **Kirsten Dunst — Spider-Man**; Halle Berry — Die Another Day; Hilary Swank — Insomnia; Jennifer Connelly — A Beautiful Mind; Miranda Otto — The Lord of the Rings: The Two Towers	**Best British Actress**: **Samantha Morton — Minority Report**; Emily Watson — Red Dragon; Helen Mirren — Gosford Park; Keira Knightley — Bend It Like Beckham; Kelly Macdonald — Gosford Park
**Best Newcomer**: **Rosamund Pike — Die Another Day**; Cillian Murphy — 28 Days Later; Neil Marshall — Dog Soldiers; Martin Compston — Sweet Sixteen; Parminder Nagra — Bend It Like Beckham	**Sony Ericsson Scene of the Year**: **Star Wars: Episode II – Attack of the Clones: Yoda's duel**; Austin Powers in Goldmember: The opening sequence; Die Another Day: The sword fight; Minority Report: The spyders; The Lord of the Rings: The Two Towers: Gollum's debate
**Honorary Awards**: Lifetime Achievement Award: **Dustin Hoffman**; Independent Spirit Award: **Michael Winterbottom and Andrew Eaton Director & Producer of 24 Hour Party People**	

=== Multiple awards ===
The following film received multiple awards:

Awards	Film
3	Minority Report

=== Multiple nominations ===
The following 11 films received multiple nominations:

Nominations	Film
7	The Lord of the Rings: The Two Towers
6	Minority Report
4	Die Another Day
3	24 Hour Party People
3	Bend It Like Beckham
3	Road to Perdition
3	Spider-Man
2	28 Days Later
2	About a Boy
2	Austin Powers in Goldmember
2	Gosford Park
