= 3rd Empire Awards =

1998 British film awards ceremony

- Date: 1998
- Empire issue: #107 (May 1998)

Highlights
- Best Film: Men in Black
- Best British Film: The Full Monty

The 3rd Empire Awards ceremony, presented by the British film magazine Empire, honored the best films of 1997 and took place in 1998. During the ceremony, Empire presented Empire Awards in nine categories as well as one honorary award. The awards were sponsored by Stella Artois for the first time.

All of the winners this year won one award each. The Full Monty won the award for Best British Film, while Men in Black won the award for Best Film. Other winners included A Life Less Ordinary, Hamlet, Jerry Maguire, L.A. Confidential, Nil by Mouth, The Crucible and The English Patient. Dennis Hopper received the Lifetime Achievement Award.

== Winners and nominees ==
Winners are listed first and highlighted in boldface.

**Best Film**: **Men in Black**	**Best British Film**: **The Full Monty**
**Best Director**: **Cameron Crowe — Jerry Maguire**	**Best British Director**: **Anthony Minghella — The English Patient**
**Best Actor**: **Kevin Spacey — L.A. Confidential**	**Best British Actor**: **Ewan McGregor — A Life Less Ordinary**
**Best Actress**: **Joan Allen — The Crucible**	**Best British Actress**: **Kate Winslet — Hamlet**
**Best Debut**: **Gary Oldman — Nil by Mouth**	**Honorary Awards**: Lifetime Achievement Award: **Dennis Hopper**
