= Empire Award for Scene of the Year =

Former annual British film award

- Awarded for: Best film scene
- Country: United Kingdom
- Presented by: Empire magazine
- First award: 2003
- Final award: 2007
- Currently held by: "The bridge attack" from Mission: Impossible III (2007)

The Empire Award for Scene of the Year was an Empire Award presented annually by the British film magazine Empire to honor the best film scene of the previous year. The Empire Award for Scene of the Year was first introduced at the 8th Empire Awards ceremony in 2003 with "Yoda's duel" from Star Wars: Episode II – Attack of the Clones receiving the award and last presented at the 12th Empire Awards ceremony in 2007 with "The bridge attack" from Mission: Impossible III receiving the award. Winners were voted by the readers of Empire magazine.

== Winners and nominees ==
In the list below, winners are listed first in boldface, followed by the other nominees. The number of the ceremony (1st, 2nd, etc.) appears in parentheses after the awards year, linked to the article (if any) on that ceremony.

=== 2000s ===
Year	Film	Scene	Ref.
**2003** **(8th)**	**Star Wars: Episode II – Attack of the Clones**	**Yoda's duel**	
**2003** **(8th)**	Austin Powers in Goldmember	The opening sequence	
**2003** **(8th)**	Die Another Day	The sword fight	
**2003** **(8th)**	Minority Report	The spyders	
**2003** **(8th)**	The Lord of the Rings: The Two Towers	Gollum's debate	
**2004** **(9th)**	**The Lord of the Rings: The Return of the King**	**The Ride of the Rohirrim**	
**2004** **(9th)**	Gangs of New York	The flag speech	
**2004** **(9th)**	Kill Bill: Volume 1	The House of the Blue Leaves	
**2004** **(9th)**	Master and Commander: The Far Side of the World	The opening battle	
**2004** **(9th)**	Pirates of the Caribbean: The Curse of the Black Pearl	The rum scene	
**2005** **(10th)**	**Enduring Love**	**The balloon sequence**	
**2005** **(10th)**	Kill Bill: Volume 2	"The Bride" versus "Elle" sequence	
**2005** **(10th)**	Shaun of the Dead	The records and zombies scene	
**2005** **(10th)**	Spider-Man 2	Spider-Man battles Dr. Octopus on the train	
**2005** **(10th)**	The Bourne Supremacy	The Moscow car chase sequence	
**2006** **(11th)**	**Star Wars: Episode III – Revenge of the Sith**	**The birth of Vader**	
**2006** **(11th)**	Crash	The car rescue	
**2006** **(11th)**	The Descent	The attack of the crawlers	
**2006** **(11th)**	Wallace & Gromit: The Curse of the Were-Rabbit	The dogfight	
**2006** **(11th)**	War of the Worlds	The arrival	
**2007** **(12th)**	**Mission: Impossible III**	**The bridge attack**	
**2007** **(12th)**	Borat	Borat's naked scrap with Azamat	
**2007** **(12th)**	Brick	The foot chase	
**2007** **(12th)**	Casino Royale	The parkour chase	
**2007** **(12th)**	Children of Men	Attack on the car	
**2007** **(12th)**	Little Miss Sunshine	Olive's dance routine	
**2007** **(12th)**	Pirates of the Caribbean: Dead Man's Chest	The waterwheel swordfight	
**2007** **(12th)**	Superman Returns	The Space Shuttle rescue	
**2007** **(12th)**	The Departed	Frank and Mr. French interrogate Costigan	
**2007** **(12th)**	X-Men: The Last Stand	The Phoenix and Professor X showdown	
