= 2nd Empire Awards =

1997 British film awards ceremony

- The logo for the 2nd Empire Awards
- Date: 5 March 1997
- Site: Park Lane Hotel, London, England
- Empire issue: #95 (May 1997)

Highlights
- Best Film: Seven
- Best British Film: Trainspotting
- Most awards: Trainspotting (4)

The 2nd Empire Awards ceremony, presented by the British film magazine Empire, honored the best films of 1996 and took place on 5 March 1997 at the Park Lane Hotel in London, England. During the ceremony, Empire presented Empire Awards in nine categories as well as two honorary awards. The award for Best British Director and the honorary Empire Inspiration Award were first introduced this year. The awards were sponsored by Miller Brewing Company.

Trainspotting won the most awards with four including Best British Film, Best British Director for Danny Boyle and Best British Actor for Ewan McGregor. Other winners included Seven with two awards including Best Film and 12 Monkeys, Fargo and Secrets & Lies with one. The Monty Python team received the Empire Inspiration Award and Freddie Francis received the Lifetime Achievement Award.

== Winners and nominees ==
Winners are listed first and highlighted in boldface.

| **Best Film**: **Seven** | **Best British Film**: **Trainspotting** |
| **Best Director**: **Terry Gilliam — 12 Monkeys** | **Best British Director**: **Danny Boyle — Trainspotting** |
| **Best Actor**: **Morgan Freeman — Seven** | **Best British Actor**: **Ewan McGregor — Trainspotting** |
| **Best Actress**: **Frances McDormand — Fargo** | **Best British Actress**: **Brenda Blethyn — Secrets & Lies** |
| **Best Debut**: **Ewen Bremner — Trainspotting** | **Honorary Awards**: Empire Inspiration Award: **The Monty Python team**; Lifetime Achievement Award: **Freddie Francis** |

=== Multiple awards ===
The following two films received multiple awards:

| Awards | Film |
|---|---|
| 4 | Trainspotting |
| 2 | Seven |
