= Empire Award for Best Actor =

Former annual British film award

- Awarded for: Best performance by an actor in a leading role
- Country: United Kingdom
- Presented by: Empire magazine
- First award: 1996
- Currently held by: Hugh Jackman - Logan (2018)

The Empire Award for Best Actor was an Empire Award presented annually by the British film magazine Empire to honor an actor who has delivered an outstanding performance in a leading role while working within the film industry. The Empire Award for Best Actor was one of five ongoing awards which were first introduced at the 1st Empire Awards ceremony in 1996 (the others being Best Actress, Best Director, Best Film and Best British Film) with Nigel Hawthorne receiving the award for his role in The Madness of King George. Winners were chosen by the readers of Empire magazine.

Since its inception, the award was given to 18 actors. Johnny Depp and James McAvoy have received the most awards in this category with two awards each. Johnny Depp was nominated on five occasions, more than any other actor. Hugh Jackman was the most recent winner in this category for his role in Logan.

== Winners and nominees ==
In the list below, winners are listed first in the colored row in boldface, followed by the other nominees. The number of the ceremony (1st, 2nd, etc.) appears in parentheses after the awards year, linked to the article (if any) on that ceremony.

Table key
Key	Description
	Indicates the winner

=== 1990s ===
Year	Actor	Character	Film	Ref.
**1996**; **(1st)**	**Nigel Hawthorne**	**King George III**	**The Madness of King George**	
**1997**; **(2nd)**	**Morgan Freeman**	**Det. Lt. William Somerset**	**Seven**	
**1998**; **(3rd)**	**Kevin Spacey**	**Det. Sgt. Jack Vincennes**	**L.A. Confidential**	
**1999**; **(4th)**	**Tom Hanks**	**Captain John H. Miller**	**Saving Private Ryan**	
**1999**; **(4th)**	Jeff Bridges	Jeffrey "The Dude" Lebowski	The Big Lebowski	
**1999**; **(4th)**	Jim Carrey	Truman Burbank	The Truman Show	
**1999**; **(4th)**	Matt Damon	Will Hunting	Good Will Hunting	
**1999**; **(4th)**	Samuel L. Jackson	Ordell Robbie	Jackie Brown	

=== 2000s ===
Year	Actor	Character	Film	Ref.
**2000**; **(5th)**	**Pierce Brosnan**	**James Bond**	**The World Is Not Enough**	
**2000**; **(5th)**	Brad Pitt	Tyler Durden	Fight Club	
**2000**; **(5th)**	Bruce Willis	Malcolm Crowe	The Sixth Sense	
**2000**; **(5th)**	Keanu Reeves	Thomas Anderson / Neo	The Matrix	
**2000**; **(5th)**	Tom Cruise	Dr. William "Bill" Harford	Eyes Wide Shut	
**2001**; **(6th)**	**Russell Crowe**	**Maximus Decimus Meridius**	**Gladiator**	
**2001**; **(6th)**	George Clooney	Ulysses Everett McGill	O Brother, Where Art Thou?	
**2001**; **(6th)**	Jim Carrey	The Grinch	Dr. Seuss' How the Grinch Stole Christmas	
**2001**; **(6th)**	John Cusack	Rob Gordon	High Fidelity	
**2001**; **(6th)**	Kevin Spacey	Lester Burnham	American Beauty	
**2002**; **(7th)**	**Elijah Wood**	**Frodo Baggins**	**The Lord of the Rings: The Fellowship of the Ring**	
**2002**; **(7th)**	Benicio del Toro	Javier Rodriguez	Traffic	
**2002**; **(7th)**	Billy Bob Thornton	Ed Crane	The Man Who Wasn't There	
**2002**; **(7th)**	Haley Joel Osment	David	A.I. Artificial Intelligence	
**2002**; **(7th)**	Viggo Mortensen	Aragorn	The Lord of the Rings: The Fellowship of the Ring	
**2003**; **(8th)**	**Tom Cruise**	**Chief John Anderton**	**Minority Report**	
**2003**; **(8th)**	Colin Farrell	Danny Witwer	Minority Report	
**2003**; **(8th)**	Mike Myers	Austin Powers; Dr. Evil	Austin Powers in Goldmember	
**2003**; **(8th)**	Tom Hanks	Michael Sullivan, Sr.	Road to Perdition	
**2003**; **(8th)**	Viggo Mortensen	Aragorn	The Lord of the Rings: The Two Towers	
**2004**; **(9th)**	**Johnny Depp**	**Captain Jack Sparrow**	**Pirates of the Caribbean: The Curse of the Black Pearl**	
**2004**; **(9th)**	Daniel Day-Lewis	William "Bill the Butcher" Cutting	Gangs of New York	
**2004**; **(9th)**	Hugh Jackman	Logan / Wolverine	X2	
**2004**; **(9th)**	Sean Astin	Samwise "Sam" Gamgee	The Lord of the Rings: The Return of the King	
**2004**; **(9th)**	Viggo Mortensen	Aragorn	The Lord of the Rings: The Return of the King	
**2005**; **(10th)**	**Matt Damon**	**David Webb / Jason Bourne**	**The Bourne Supremacy**	
**2005**; **(10th)**	Jim Carrey	Joel Barish	Eternal Sunshine of the Spotless Mind	
**2005**; **(10th)**	Johnny Depp	J. M. Barrie	Finding Neverland	
**2005**; **(10th)**	Tobey Maguire	Peter Parker / Spider-Man	Spider-Man 2	
**2005**; **(10th)**	Tom Cruise	Vincent	Collateral	
**2006**; **(11th)**	**Johnny Depp**	**Willy Wonka**	**Charlie And The Chocolate Factory**	
**2006**; **(11th)**	Andy Serkis	Kong	King Kong	
**2006**; **(11th)**	Christian Bale	Bruce Wayne / Batman	Batman Begins	
**2006**; **(11th)**	Matt Dillon	Sgt. John Ryan	Crash	
**2006**; **(11th)**	Viggo Mortensen	Tom Stall / Joey Cusack	A History of Violence	
**2007**; **(12th)**	**Daniel Craig**	**James Bond**	**Casino Royale**	
**2007**; **(12th)**	Christian Bale	Alfred Borden (The Professor) / Fallon	The Prestige	
**2007**; **(12th)**	Johnny Depp	Captain Jack Sparrow	Pirates of the Caribbean: Dead Man's Chest	
**2007**; **(12th)**	Leonardo DiCaprio	William "Billy" Costigan, Jr.	The Departed	
**2007**; **(12th)**	Sacha Baron Cohen	Borat Sagdiyev	Borat	
**2008**; **(13th)**	**James McAvoy**	**Robbie Turner**	**Atonement**	
**2008**; **(13th)**	Daniel Radcliffe	Harry Potter	Harry Potter and the Order of the Phoenix	
**2008**; **(13th)**	Gerard Butler	Leonidas	300	
**2008**; **(13th)**	Matt Damon	David Webb / Jason Bourne	The Bourne Ultimatum	
**2008**; **(13th)**	Simon Pegg	Sgt. Nicholas "Nick" Angel	Hot Fuzz	
**2009**; **(14th)**	**Christian Bale**	**Bruce Wayne / Batman**	**The Dark Knight**	
**2009**; **(14th)**	Daniel Craig	James Bond	Quantum of Solace	
**2009**; **(14th)**	Daniel Day-Lewis	Daniel Plainview	There Will Be Blood	
**2009**; **(14th)**	Johnny Depp	Benjamin Barker / Sweeney Todd	Sweeney Todd: The Demon Barber of Fleet Street	
**2009**; **(14th)**	Robert Downey Jr.	Tony Stark / Iron Man	Iron Man	

=== 2010s ===
Year	Actor	Character	Film	Ref.
**2010**; **(15th)**	**Christoph Waltz**	**SS Colonel Hans Landa**	**Inglourious Basterds**	
**2010**; **(15th)**	Michael Caine	Harold "Harry" Brown	Harry Brown	
**2010**; **(15th)**	Robert Downey Jr.	Sherlock Holmes	Sherlock Holmes	
**2010**; **(15th)**	Robert Pattinson	Edward Cullen	The Twilight Saga: New Moon	
**2010**; **(15th)**	Sam Worthington	Jake Sully	Avatar	
**2011**; **(16th)**	**Colin Firth**	**King George VI**	**The King's Speech**	
**2011**; **(16th)**	Aaron Taylor-Johnson	Dave Lizewski / Kick-Ass	Kick-Ass	
**2011**; **(16th)**	James Franco	Aron Ralston	127 Hours	
**2011**; **(16th)**	Jesse Eisenberg	Mark Zuckerberg	The Social Network	
**2011**; **(16th)**	Leonardo DiCaprio	Dom Cobb	Inception	
**2012**; **(17th)**	**Gary Oldman**	**George Smiley**	**Tinker Tailor Soldier Spy**	
**2012**; **(17th)**	Andy Serkis	Caesar	Rise of the Planet of the Apes	
**2012**; **(17th)**	Daniel Craig	Mikael Blomkvist	The Girl with the Dragon Tattoo	
**2012**; **(17th)**	Daniel Radcliffe	Harry Potter	Harry Potter and the Deathly Hallows – Part 2	
**2012**; **(17th)**	Ryan Gosling	Driver	Drive	
**2013**; **(18th)**	**Martin Freeman**	**Bilbo Baggins**	**The Hobbit: An Unexpected Journey**	
**2013**; **(18th)**	Christoph Waltz	Dr. King Schultz	Django Unchained	
**2013**; **(18th)**	Daniel Craig	James Bond	Skyfall	
**2013**; **(18th)**	Daniel Day-Lewis	President Abraham Lincoln	Lincoln	
**2013**; **(18th)**	Robert Downey Jr.	Tony Stark / Iron Man	The Avengers	
**2014**; **(19th)**	**James McAvoy**	**DS / PC Bruce Robertson**	**Filth**	
**2014**; **(19th)**	Chiwetel Ejiofor	Solomon Northup	12 Years a Slave	
**2014**; **(19th)**	Leonardo DiCaprio	Jordan Belfort	The Wolf of Wall Street	
**2014**; **(19th)**	Martin Freeman	Bilbo Baggins	The Hobbit: The Desolation of Smaug	
**2014**; **(19th)**	Tom Hanks	Richard "Rich" Phillips	Captain Phillips	
**2015**; **(20th)**	**Andy Serkis**	**Caesar**	**Dawn of the Planet of the Apes**	
**2015**; **(20th)**	Benedict Cumberbatch	Alan Turing	The Imitation Game	
**2015**; **(20th)**	Bradley Cooper	Chris Kyle	American Sniper	
**2015**; **(20th)**	Eddie Redmayne	Stephen Hawking	The Theory of Everything	
**2015**; **(20th)**	Richard Armitage	Thorin Oakenshield	The Hobbit: The Battle of the Five Armies	
**2016**; **(21st)**	**Matt Damon**	**Mark Watney**	**The Martian**	
**2016**; **(21st)**	Leonardo DiCaprio	Hugh Glass	The Revenant	
**2016**; **(21st)**	Michael B. Jordan	Adonis Creed	Creed	
**2016**; **(21st)**	Michael Fassbender (Note: Academy Award nominated performance for Steve Jobs.)	Macbeth; Steve Jobs	Macbeth; Steve Jobs	
**2016**; **(21st)**	Tom Hardy	Ronald "Ronnie" Kray and Reginald "Reggie" Kray; Max Rockatansky	Legend & Mad Max: Fury Road	
**2017**; **(22nd)**	**Eddie Redmayne**	**Newton “Newt” Scamander**	**Fantastic Beasts and Where to Find Them**	
**2017**; **(22nd)**	Benedict Cumberbatch	Stephen Strange	Doctor Strange	
**2017**; **(22nd)**	Casey Affleck	Lee Chandler	Manchester by the Sea	
**2017**; **(22nd)**	Ryan Gosling	Sebastian Wilder	La La Land	
**2017**; **(22nd)**	Ryan Reynolds	Wade Wilson / Deadpool	Deadpool	
**2018**; **(23rd)**	**Hugh Jackman**	**James Howlett / Logan / Wolverine**	**Logan**	
**2018**; **(23rd)**	Andy Serkis	Caesar	War for the Planet of the Apes	
**2018**; **(23rd)**	Armie Hammer	Oliver	Call Me by Your Name	
**2018**; **(23rd)**	Gary Oldman	Winston Churchill	Darkest Hour	
**2018**; **(23rd)**	John Boyega	Finn	Star Wars: The Last Jedi	

== Multiple awards and nominations ==
=== Multiple awards ===
As of the 23rd Empire Awards, the following individuals received two or more Best Actor awards:

Awards	Film
2	James McAvoy
2	Johnny Depp
2	Matt Damon

=== Multiple nominations ===
As of the 23rd Empire Awards, the following individuals received two or more Best Actor nominations:

Nominations	Film
5	Johnny Depp
4	Andy Serkis
4	Daniel Craig
4	Leonardo DiCaprio
4	Matt Damon
4	Viggo Mortensen
3	Christian Bale
3	Daniel Day-Lewis
3	Jim Carrey
3	Robert Downey Jr.
3	Tom Cruise
3	Tom Hanks
2	Benedict Cumberbatch
2	Christoph Waltz
2	Daniel Radcliffe
2	Eddie Redmayne
2	Hugh Jackman
2	James McAvoy
2	Kevin Spacey
2	Martin Freeman
2	Ryan Gosling
