= Empire Special Honorary Awards =

Former annual British film award

The Empire Special Honorary Awards are honorary Empire Awards presented by the British film magazine Empire on special occasions such as an Empire anniversary milestone or a passing of an actor. The first special honorary award was the Icon of the Decade which was presented at the 10th Empire Awards ceremony in 2005 to director Quentin Tarantino. Actors Arnold Schwarzenegger and Tom Cruise are the most recent winners in this category, receiving the Action Hero of our Lifetime and Legend of our Lifetime awards, respectively, at the 19th Empire Awards ceremony in 2014. As of the 19th Empire Awards five such awards have been handed out.

== Awards ==
=== Actor of our Lifetime Award ===
The Actor Of Our Lifetime Award was a special honorary Empire Award that was presented by Empire only once, to mark the magazine's 20th anniversary, at the 14th Empire Awards in 2009, to Russell Crowe, to honour an actor who as Dara Ó Briain who introduced the award said "has delivered some of the finest big-screen performances, who has created some unforgettable movie moments and who has become a favourite of Empire and its readers"

==== Winner ====
Year	Icon	Ref
2009 (14th)
2009 (14th)	Russell Crowe	

=== Action Hero of our Lifetime Award ===
The Action Hero of Our Lifetime Award (AKA Empire 25th Award: Action Hero of Our Lifetime) was a special honorary Empire Award that was presented by Empire only once, to mark the magazine's 25th anniversary, at the 19th Empire Awards in 2014, to Arnold Schwarzenegger.

==== Winner ====
Year	Icon	Ref
2014 (19th)
2014 (19th)	Arnold Schwarzenegger	

=== Legend of our Lifetime ===
The Legend of Our Lifetime Award (AKA Empire 25th Award: Legend of Our Lifetime) was a special honorary Empire Award that was presented by Empire once, to mark the magazine's 25th anniversary, at the 19th Empire Awards in 2014, to Tom Cruise and was presented again at the 23rd Empire Awards to Steven Spielberg.

==== Winner ====
Year	Icon	Ref
2014 (19th)
2014 (19th)	Tom Cruise	
2018 (23rd)
2018 (23rd)	Steven Spielberg	

=== Icon of the Decade Award ===
The Icon of the Decade Award was a special honorary Empire Award that was presented by Empire only once, to mark the award's 10th anniversary, at the 10th Empire Awards in 2005 to Quentin Tarantino.

==== Winner ====
Year	Winner	Ref
2005 (10th)
2005 (10th)	Quentin Tarantino	

=== Heath Ledger Tribute Award ===
The Heath Ledger Tribute Award was a special honorary Empire Award that was presented by Empire magazine only once, at the 14th Empire Awards in 2009, to mark the sad loss of Heath Ledger, a great young talent and to acknowledge his outstanding work.

==== Winner ====
Year	Icon	Ref
2009 (14th)
2009 (14th)	Heath Ledger	
