= 1st Empire Awards =

1996 British film awards ceremony

- Date: 1996
- Empire issue: #82 (April 1996)

Highlights
- Best Film: Braveheart
- Best British Film: Shallow Grave
- Most awards: Shallow Grave (3)

The 1st Empire Awards ceremony, presented by the British film magazine Empire, honored the best films of 1995 and took place in 1996. During the ceremony, Empire presented Empire Awards in eight categories as well as one honorary award. The first award ceremony introduced eight award categories for Best Film, Best British Film, Best Actor, Best British Actor, Best Actress, Best British Actress, Best Director and Best Debut as well as the honorary Lifetime Achievement Award.

Shallow Grave won the most awards with three including Best British Film, Best Director for Danny Boyle and Best British Actor for Ewan McGregor. Other winners included Braveheart with one award for Best Film and Heavenly Creatures, The Madness of King George, The Usual Suspects and To Die For also with one. Mike Leigh received the Lifetime Achievement Award.

== Winners and nominees ==
Winners are listed first and highlighted in boldface.

**Best Film**: **Braveheart**	**Best British Film**: **Shallow Grave**
**Best Director**: **Danny Boyle — Shallow Grave**	
**Best Actor**: **Nigel Hawthorne — The Madness of King George**	**Best British Actor**: **Ewan McGregor — Shallow Grave**
**Best Actress**: **Nicole Kidman — To Die For**	**Best British Actress**: **Kate Winslet — Heavenly Creatures**
**Best Debut**: **Bryan Singer — The Usual Suspects**	**Honorary Awards**: Lifetime Achievement Award: **Mike Leigh**

=== Multiple awards ===
The following film received multiple awards:

Awards	Film
3	Shallow Grave
