= Empire Awards =

Award for professionals in the local and global film industry

Empire Award
- The Empire logo
- Awarded for: Excellence in cinematic achievements
- Country: United Kingdom
- Presented by: Empire
- First award: 1996
- Final award: 18 March 2018

The Empire Awards was an annual British awards ceremony honouring cinematic achievements in the local and global film industry. Winners were awarded the Empire Award statuette. The awards, first presented in 1996, were presented by the British film magazine Empire with the winners voted by the readers of the magazine.

The 23rd Empire Awards was the final ceremony, held on 18 March 2018 in London to honour films released in 2017. The awards were sponsored by Jameson Irish Whiskey from the 14th Empire Awards and were thenceforth officially called the Jameson Empire Awards. The official sponsor of the Awards changed to Rakuten TV for the 23rd Empire Awards. The Empire Awards ceremonies were discontinued after 2018 for unknown reasons.

== Empire Awards categories ==
=== Award categories ===
- Best Actor: 1996 to 2018
- Best Actress: 1996 to 2018
- Best Director: 1996 to 2018
- Best Male Newcomer: 2012 to 2018
- Best Female Newcomer: 2012 to 2018
- Best Film: 1996 to 2018
- Best British Film: 1996 to 2018; In 2002 it was known as "Sky Movies Best British Film"
- Best Comedy: 2006 to 2018
- Best Horror: 2006 to 2018
- Best Sci-Fi/Fantasy: 2006 to 2018; In 2009 it was known as "Best Sci-Fi/Superhero"
- Best Thriller: 2006 to 2018
- Best Soundtrack: 2008–2009, 2016–2018
- Best Animated Film: 2016 to 2018
- Best Documentary: 2016 to 2018
- Best Screenplay: 2016 to 2018
- Best Makeup And Hairstyling: 2016 to 2018
- Best Costume Design: 2016 to 2018
- Best Production Design: 2016 to 2018
- Best Visual Effects: 2016 to 2018
- Best TV Series: 2016 to 2018
- Best Actor in a TV Series: 2018
- Best Actress in a TV Series: 2018

=== Retired awards ===
- Best British Actor: 1996 to 2005
- Best British Actress: 1996 to 2005
- Best British Director: 1997 to 2001; 2005
- Best Supporting Actor: 2014
- Best Supporting Actress: 2014
- Best Newcomer: 1996 to 2011; From 1996 to 2002 it was known as "Best Debut" (was split into Male and Female Newcomer categories in 2012)
- Scene of the Year: 2003 to 2007; From 2003 to 2006 it was known as "Sony Ericsson Scene of the Year"; In 2007 it was known as "Scene of the Year"
- The Art of 3D: 2012 to 2013
- Done In 60 Seconds Award: 2008 to 2014
- Best Short Film: 2016 to 2017

== Honorary Empire Awards ==
=== Honorary awards ===
As of the 19th Empire Awards four honorary awards were handed out:

- Empire Hero Award: 2010 to 2018
- Empire Icon Award: 2006; 2008 to 2011; 2014
- Empire Inspiration Award: 1997; 1999 to 2002; 2004 to 2006; 2008; 2010 to 2018
- Empire Legend Award: 2012 to 2013; 2015 to 2017; Legend of our Lifetime Award: 2014; 2018

=== Retired honorary awards ===
- Contribution to Cinema Award: 2000 only
- Outstanding Contribution to British Cinema Award: 2005 to 2006; Outstanding Contribution To British Film: 2008 to 2010; Outstanding Contribution: 2013 only
- Independent Spirit Award: 2002 to 2005
- Lifetime Achievement Award: 1996 to 2003; 2006; Career Achievement Award: 2004 only
- Movie Masterpiece Award: 1999 to 2000

=== Empire Special Honorary Awards ===
- Actor Of Our Lifetime: 2009 only
- Action Hero of Our Lifetime: 2014 only
- Legend of Our Lifetime: 2014; 2018
- Icon of the Decade: 2005 only
- Heath Ledger Tribute: 2009 only
