= Michael Fassbender filmography =

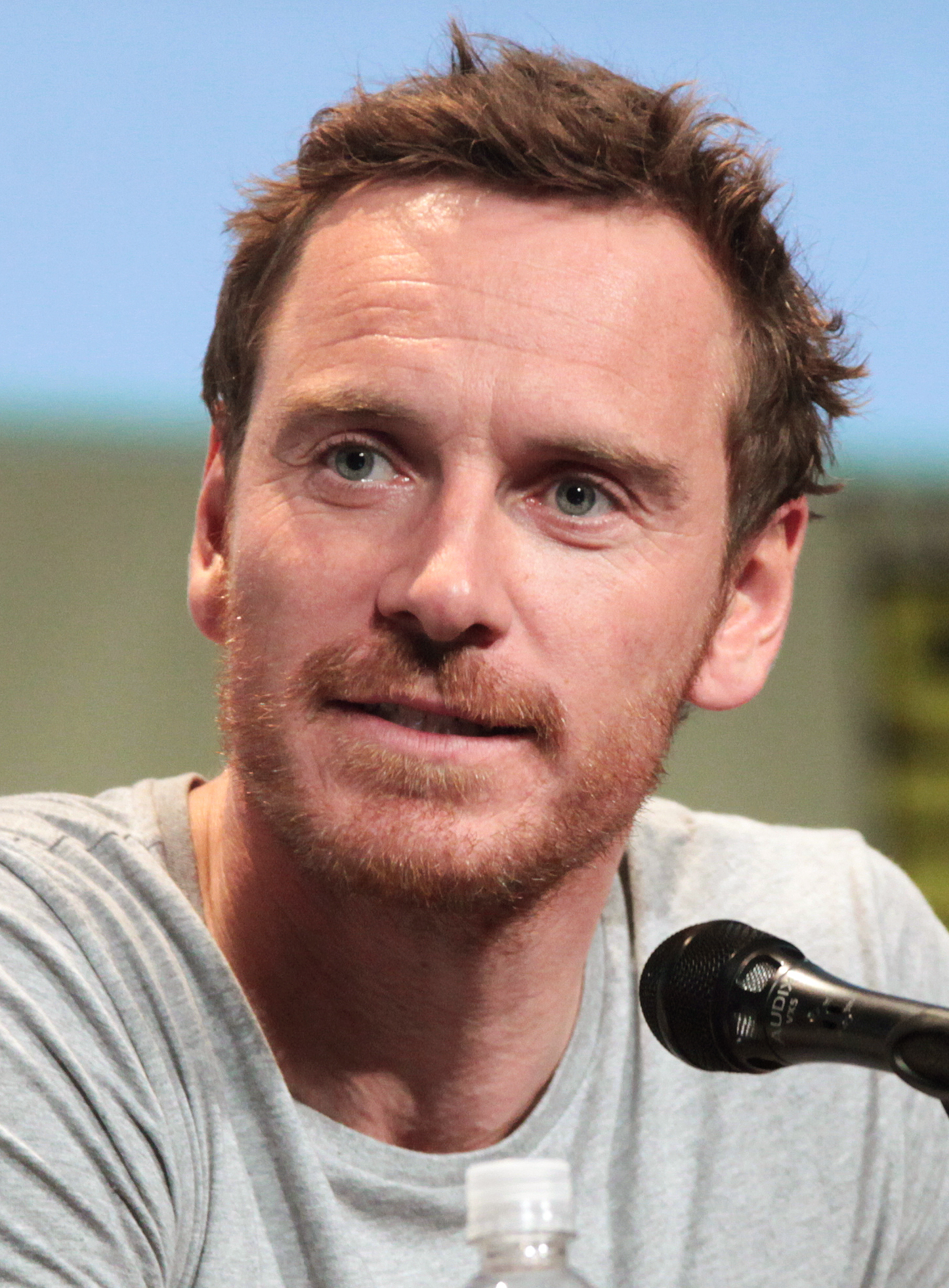
Fassbender in 2015

Michael Fassbender is a German-Irish actor who made his screen debut in the 2001 war drama miniseries Band of Brothers as Burton Christenson. Fassbender followed this with a number of television roles including a German motorcycle courier in the drama Hearts and Bones (2001), Guy Fawkes in the miniseries Gunpowder, Treason & Plot (2004), Lt. Harry Colebourn in the film A Bear Named Winnie (2004), and Azazeal in the series Hex (2004–05). He made his film debut playing a Spartan soldier in Zack Snyder's 300 (2007).

In 2008, Fassbender portrayed Irish republican Bobby Sands during the events of the 1981 Irish hunger strike in Steve McQueen's historical drama Hunger. His performance garnered him the Best Actor award at the British Independent Film Awards, and the Irish Film and Television Awards.

Fassbender appeared as a British soldier in Quentin Tarantino-directed film Inglourious Basterds (2009). In 2011, he played Carl Jung in David Cronenberg's A Dangerous Method, and a man suffering with sex addiction in McQueen's Shame. His performance in the latter earned him the Volpi Cup for Best Actor at the Venice Film Festival. In the same year he appeared in superhero film X-Men: First Class as young Magneto. In 2013, Fassbender reteamed with McQueen on the period drama 12 Years a Slave. For his role as a slave owner in the film he received a nomination for the Academy Award for Best Supporting Actor.

In 2014, he reprised his role as Magneto in the superhero sequel X-Men: Days of Future Past which grossed a box-office total of over $747 million—his highest grossing release as of September 2019. In 2015, he appeared as the title character in Justin Kurzel's film adaptation of the play Macbeth. In the same year, Fassbender's portrayal of Steve Jobs in Danny Boyle's eponymous film garnered him a nomination for the Academy Award for Best Actor.

== Film ==
Key
†	Denotes films that have not yet been released

Year	Title	Role(s)	Notes	Ref(s)
2007	300	Stelios		
2007	Angel	Esmé		
2008	Hunger	Bobby Sands		
2008	Eden Lake	Steve		
2009	Blood Creek	Richard Wirth		
2009	Fish Tank	Connor		
2009	Inglourious Basterds	Lt. Archie Hicox		
2009	Man on a Motorcycle	Man on a Motorcycle	Short film	
2010	Centurion	Quintus Dias		
2010	Jonah Hex	Burke		
2011	Jane Eyre	Edward Fairfax Rochester		
2011	X-Men: First Class	Erik Lehnsherr / Magneto (Note: Fassbender plays a character known by two different names in this film)		
2011	A Dangerous Method	Carl Jung		
2011	Shame	Brandon Sullivan		
2011	Pitch Black Heist	Michael	Short film; also executive producer	
2011	Haywire	Paul		
2012	Prometheus	David^{8}		
2013	12 Years a Slave	Edwin Epps		
2013	The Counselor	Counselor		
2013	1	Narrator	Documentary	
2014	Frank	Frank		
2014	X-Men: Days of Future Past	Erik Lehnsherr / Magneto	Shared role with Ian McKellen	
2015	Slow West	Silas Selleck	Also executive producer	
2015	Macbeth	Macbeth		
2015	Steve Jobs	Steve Jobs		
2016	X-Men: Apocalypse	Erik Lehnsherr / Magneto		
2016	The Light Between Oceans	Tom Sherbourne		
2016	Trespass Against Us	Chad Cutler		
2016	Assassin's Creed	Callum Lynch / Aguilar de Nerha (Note: Fassbender plays two different characters in this film)	Producer	
2017	Song to Song	Cook		
2017	Alien: Covenant	David^{8} / Walter One		
2017	The Snowman	Harry Hole		
2019	X-Men: Dark Phoenix	Erik Lehnsherr / Magneto		
2023	The Killer	The Killer		
2023	Next Goal Wins	Thomas Rongen		
2024	Kneecap	Arlo Ó Cairealláin		
2025	Black Bag	George Woodhouse		
2026	Hope	Ma'veyyo		
TBA	Kung Fury 2 †	Colt Magnum	Completed	
TBA	The Origin of the World †	TBA	Filming	

== Television ==
Key
†	Denotes titles that have not yet been released

Year(s)	Title	Role	Notes	Ref(s)
2001	Band of Brothers	Burton Christenson	7 episodes	
2001	Hearts and Bones	Hermann	3 episodes	
2002	NCS: Manhunt	Jack Silver	4 episodes	
2002	Holby City	Christian Connolly	Episode: "Ghosts"	
2003	Carla	Rob	Television film	
2004	Gunpowder, Treason & Plot	Guy Fawkes	Television film	
2004	Julian Fellowes Investigates: A Most Mysterious Murder	Charles Bravo	Television film	
2004	A Bear Named Winnie	Lt. Harry Colebourn	Television film	
2004	Sherlock Holmes and the Case of the Silk Stocking	Charles Allen	Television film	
2004–2005	Hex	Azazeal	12 episodes	
2005	Murphy's Law	Caz Miller	5 episodes	
2005	Our Hidden Lives	German POW	Television film	
2005	William and Mary	Lukasz	Episode #3.3	
2006	Agatha Christie's Poirot	George Abernethie	Episode: "After the Funeral"	
2006	Trial & Retribution	Douglas Nesbitt	2 episodes	
2007	Wedding Belles	Barney	Television film	
2008	The Devil's Whore	Thomas Rainsborough	4 episodes	
2019–2023	Michael Fassbender: Road to Le Mans	Self	Documentary series	
2024–present	The Agency	Brandon "Martian" Cunningham	Main cast; also executive producer	
TBA	Kennedy †	Joseph P. Kennedy, Sr.	Main cast	

== Music videos ==
Year	Song	Artist(s)	Role	Ref.
2003	"Blind Pilots"	The Cooper Temple Clause	Stag/Pan	

== Video games ==
Year	Title	Role	Ref.
2010	Fable III	Logan (voice)	

== See also ==
- List of awards and nominations received by Michael Fassbender

== Bibliography ==
- Maloney, Jim (3 September 2012). Michael Fassbender – The Biography. John Blake Publishing. ISBN 978-1-78219-075-2.
