= List of awards and nominations received by Michael Fassbender =

Michael Fassbender awards and nominations
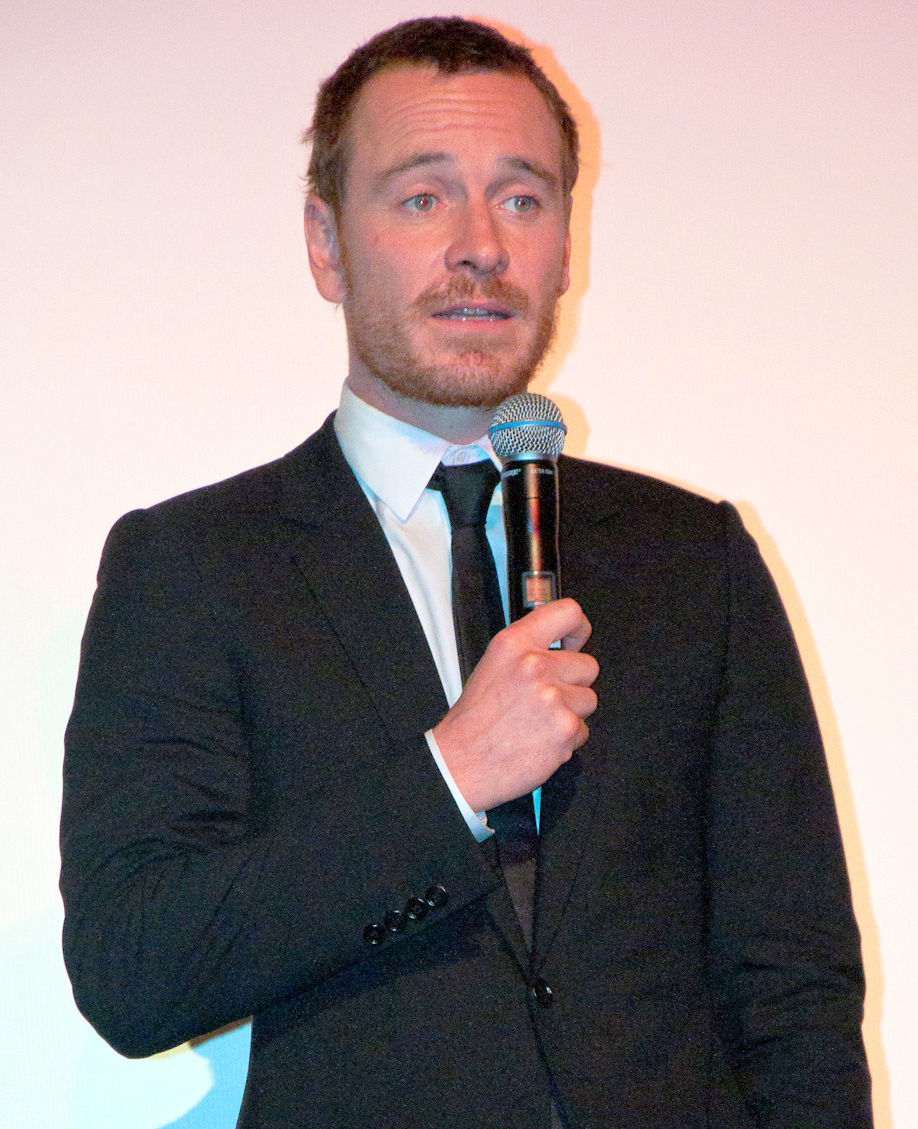
- Fassbender at the 2011 Toronto International Film Festival
Award	Wins	Nominations
Academy Awards	0	2
Actor Awards	1	4
British Academy Film Awards	0	4
Critics' Choice Movie Awards	1	4
Golden Globe Awards	0	3
Overall	76	141

The following is a list of awards and nominations received by German-Irish actor Michael Fassbender throughout his acting career.

== By award ==
=== Academy Awards ===
#	Year	Category	Film	Result
1	2014	Best Supporting Actor	12 Years a Slave	Nominated
2	2016	Best Actor	Steve Jobs	Nominated

=== AACTA International Awards ===
#	Year	Category	Film	Result
1	2012	Best Actor	Shame	Nominated
2	2014	Best Supporting Actor	12 Years a Slave	Won
3	2016	Best Actor	Steve Jobs	Nominated

=== British Academy Film Awards ===
#	Year	Category	Film	Result
1	2009	BAFTA Rising Star Award	—N/a	Nominated
2	2012	Best Actor in a Leading Role	Shame	Nominated
3	2014	Best Actor in a Supporting Role	12 Years a Slave	Nominated
4	2016	Best Actor in a Leading Role	Steve Jobs	Nominated

=== British Independent Film Awards ===
#	Year	Category	Film	Result
1	2008	Best Actor	Hunger	Won
2	2009	Best Supporting Actor	Fish Tank	Nominated
3	2011	Best Actor	Shame	Won
4	2014	Best Supporting Actor	Frank	Nominated
5	2015	Best Actor	Macbeth	Nominated

=== Critics' Choice Movie Awards ===
#	Year	Category	Film	Result
1	2010	Best Ensemble	Inglourious Basterds	Won
2	2011	Best Actor	Shame	Nominated
3	2013	Best Supporting Actor	12 Years a Slave	Nominated
4	2015	Best Actor	Steve Jobs	Nominated

=== Empire Awards ===
#	Year	Category	Film	Result
1	2012	Empire Hero Award	—N/a	Won
2	2014	Best Supporting Actor	12 Years a Slave	Won
3	2016	Best Actor	Macbeth and Steve Jobs	Won

=== European Film Awards ===
#	Year	Category	Film	Result
1	2008	Best Actor	Hunger	Nominated
2	2012	Best Actor	Shame	Nominated

=== Golden Globe Awards ===
#	Year	Category	Film	Result
1	2012	Best Actor – Motion Picture Drama	Shame	Nominated
2	2014	Best Supporting Actor – Motion Picture	12 Years a Slave	Nominated
3	2016	Best Actor – Motion Picture Drama	Steve Jobs	Nominated

=== Irish Film & Television Awards ===
#	Year	Category	Film	Result
1	2009	Rising Star Award	—N/a	Won
2	2009	Best Actor in a Lead Role in a Film	Hunger	Won
3	2009	Best Actor in a Supporting Role in Television	The Devil's Whore	Nominated
4	2010	Best Actor in a Supporting Role in a Film	Fish Tank	Nominated
5	2012	Best Actor in a Lead Role in a Film	Shame	Won
6	2014	Best Actor in a Supporting Role in a Film	12 Years a Slave	Won
7	2015	Best Actor in a Lead Role in a Film	Frank	Nominated
8	2016	Best Actor in a Lead Role in a Film	Steve Jobs	Won
9	2025	Best Actor in Drama	The Agency	Nominated
10	2025	Best Actor in a Supporting Role in a Film	Kneecap	Nominated

=== London Film Critics' Circle ===
#	Year	Category	Film	Result
1	2009	British Actor of the Year	Hunger	Won
2	2010	British Supporting Actor of the Year	Fish Tank	Won
3	2011	British Actor of the Year	Shame, A Dangerous Method	Won
4	2011	Actor of the Year	Shame	Nominated
5	2012	Supporting Actor of the Year	Prometheus	Nominated
6	2013	British Actor of the Year	12 Years a Slave	Nominated
7	2013	Supporting Actor of the Year	12 Years a Slave	Nominated
8	2015	British or Irish Actor of the Year	Macbeth, Slow West, Steve Jobs	Nominated
9	2015	Actor of the Year	Steve Jobs	Nominated

=== National Board of Review ===
#	Year	Category	Film	Result
1	2011	Spotlight Award	Shame, Jane Eyre, X-Men: First Class, A Dangerous Method	Won

=== Online Film Critics Society ===
#	Year	Category	Film	Result
1	2009	Best Actor	Shame	Won
2	2013	Best Supporting Actor	12 Years a Slave	Won
3	2015	Best Actor	Steve Jobs	Won

=== Satellite Awards ===
#	Year	Category	Film	Result
1	2011	Best Actor in a Motion Picture	Shame	Nominated
2	2013	Best Supporting Actor in a Motion Picture	12 Years a Slave	Nominated
2	2015	Best Actor in a Motion Picture	Steve Jobs	Nominated

=== Screen Actors Guild Awards ===
#	Year	Category	Film	Result
1	2010	Outstanding Performance by a Cast in a Motion Picture	Inglourious Basterds	Won
2	2014	Outstanding Performance by a Male Actor in a Supporting Role	12 Years a Slave	Nominated
3	2014	Outstanding Performance by a Cast in a Motion Picture	12 Years a Slave	Nominated
4	2016	Outstanding Performance by a Male Actor in a Leading Role	Steve Jobs	Nominated

=== Venice International Film Festival ===
#	Year	Category	Film	Result
1	2011	Volpi Cup for Best Actor	Shame	Won

== By film or TV series ==
=== Hunger (2008) ===
1. British Independent Film Award – 2008: Best Actor (won)
2. Chicago International Film Festival – 2008: Silver Hugo for Best Actor (won)
3. European Film Award – 2008: Best Actor (nominated)
4. Festival du nouveau cinéma – 2008: Acting Award (won)
5. Stockholm International Film Festival – 2008: Best Actor (won)
6. Evening Standard British Film Award – 2009: Best Actor (nominated)
7. Irish Film & Television Academy – 2009: Best Actor in a Lead Role in a Film (won)
8. London Film Critics' Circle – 2009: British Actor of the Year (won)
9. Toronto Film Critics Association – 2009: Best Actor (nominated)

=== The Devil's Whore (2008) ===
1. Irish Film & Television Academy – 2009: Best Actor in a Supporting Role in Television (nominated)

=== Fish Tank (2009) ===
1. British Independent Film Award – 2009: Best Supporting Actor (nominated)
2. Chicago International Film Festival – 2009: Gold Plaque for Best Supporting Actor (won)
3. Irish Film & Television Academy – 2010: Best Actor in a Supporting Role in a Film (nominated)
4. London Film Critics' Circle – 2010: British Supporting Actor of the Year (won)

=== Inglourious Basterds (2009) ===
1. Critics' Choice Movie Award – 2010: Best Acting Ensemble (won)
2. Screen Actors Guild Award – 2010: Outstanding Performance by a Cast in a Motion Picture (won)
3. San Diego Film Critics Society – 2010: Best Performance by an Ensemble (won)

=== X-Men: First Class (2011) ===
1. IGN Award – 2011: Best Ensemble Cast (won)
2. IGN Award – 2011: Best Villain (won)
3. Los Angeles Film Critics Association – 2011: Best Actor (won)
4. National Board of Review – 2011: Spotlight Award (won)
5. People's Choice Award – 2011: Favorite Ensemble Movie Cast (nominated)
6. Scream Award – 2011: Best Fantasy Actor (nominated)
7. Scream Award – 2011: Breakout Performance – Male (nominated)
8. Scream Award – 2011: Best Ensemble (nominated)

=== Jane Eyre (2011) ===
1. Los Angeles Film Critics Association – 2011: Best Actor (won)
2. National Board of Review – 2011: Spotlight Award (won)

=== A Dangerous Method (2011) ===
1. Los Angeles Film Critics Association – 2011: Best Actor (won)
2. National Board of Review – 2011: Spotlight Award (won)
3. Genie Award – 2012: Best Actor in a Leading Role (nominated)
4. London Film Critics' Circle – 2012: British Actor of the Year (won)

=== Shame (2011) ===
1. British Independent Film Award – 2011: Best Actor (won)
2. Chicago Film Critics Association – 2011: Best Actor (nominated)
3. Critics' Choice Movie Award – 2011: Best Actor (nominated)
4. Detroit Film Critics Society – 2011: Best Actor (won)
5. Florida Film Critics Circle – 2011: Best Actor (won)
6. Golden Globe Award – 2011: Best Actor – Motion Picture Drama (nominated)
7. Houston Film Critics – 2011: Best Actor (won)
8. Los Angeles Film Critics Association – 2011: Best Actor (won)
9. National Board of Review – 2011: Spotlight Award (won)
10. Online Film Critics Society – 2011: Best Actor (won)
11. Phoenix Film Critics Society – 2011: Best Actor (nominated)
12. Satellite Award – 2011: Best Actor in a Motion Picture (nominated)
13. Seville European Film Festival – 2011: Best Actor (won)
14. St. Louis Gateway Film Critics Association – 2011: Best Actor (nominated)
15. Venice Film Festival – 2011: Volpi Cup for Best Actor (won)
16. WAFCA Award – 2011: Best Actor (nominated)
17. Alliance of Women Film Journalists Award – 2012: Best Actor (won)
18. Australian Academy of Cinema and Television Arts Award – 2012: AACTA International Award for Best Actor (nominated)
19. BAFTA Award – 2012: Best Actor (nominated)
20. Capri Hollywood International Film Festival – 2011: Best Actor (won)
21. Evening Standard British Film Award – 2012: Best Actor (won)
22. Denver Film Critics Society – 2012: Best Actor (nominated)
23. Gay and Lesbian Entertainment Critics Association – 2012: Film Performance of the Year (nominated)
24. Gay and Lesbian Entertainment Critics Association – 2012: Rising Star (won)
25. IndieWire Critics Survey – 2012: Best Lead Performance (won)
26. Irish Film & Television Academy – 2012: Best Actor in a Lead Role in a Film (won)
27. London Film Critics' Circle – 2012: British Actor of the Year (won)
28. London Film Critics' Circle – 2012: Actor of the Year (nominated)
29. Richard Attenborough UK Regional Film Award – 2012: Best Actor (won)
30. Toronto Film Critics Association – 2012: Best Actor (nominated)
31. Vancouver Film Critics Circle – 2012: Best Actor (won)
32. European Film Award – 2012: European Actor 2012 (nominated)

=== Prometheus (2012) ===
1. London Film Critics' Circle – 2012: Supporting Actor of the Year (nominated)
2. Saturn Award – 2013: Best Supporting Actor (nominated)

=== 12 Years a Slave (2013) ===
1. Independent Spirit Award – 2013: Best Supporting Male (nominated)
2. Academy Award – 2014: Best Supporting Actor (nominated)
3. BAFTA Award – 2014: Best Actor in a Supporting Role (nominated)
4. Critics' Choice Movie Award – 2014: Best Supporting Actor (nominated)
5. Golden Globe Award – 2013: Best Supporting Actor – Motion Picture (nominated)
6. London Film Critics' Circle – 2013: British Actor of the Year (nominated)
7. London Film Critics' Circle – 2013: Supporting Actor of the Year (nominated)
8. Screen Actors Guild Award – 2013: Outstanding Performance by a Cast in a Motion Picture (nominated)
9. Screen Actors Guild Award – 2013: Outstanding Performance by a Supporting Actor in a Motion Picture (nominated)
10. Chicago Film Critics Association – 2013: Best Supporting Actor (nominated)
11. San Diego Film Critics Society – 2013: Best Supporting Actor (nominated)
12. San Francisco Film Critics Circle – 2013: Best Supporting Actor (nominated)
13. Satellite Award – 2014: Best Actor in a Supporting Role (nominated)
14. Vancouver Film Critics Circle – 2014: Best Supporting Actor (nominated)
15. Washington D.C. Area Film Critics Association – 2013: Best Supporting Actor (nominated)
16. Online Film Critics Society – 2014: Best Supporting Actor (won)
17. AACTA Award – 2014: Best Supporting Actor (won)
18. Empire Award – 2014: Best Supporting Actor (won)
19. Irish Film & Television Academy – 2014: Best Actor in a Supporting Role in a Film (won)

=== Frank (2014) ===
1. British Independent Film Award – 2014: Best Supporting Actor (nominated)
2. Chlotrudis Award – 2015: Best Supporting Actor (nominated)
3. Irish Film & Television Academy – 2015: Best Actor in a Lead Role in a Film (nominated)

=== X-Men: Days of Future Past (2014) ===
1. Teen Choice Award – 2014: Choice Movie Villain (nominated)

=== Macbeth (2015) ===
1. British Independent Film Award – 2015: Best Actor (nominated)

=== Steve Jobs (2015) ===
1. Washington D.C. Area Film Critics Association – 2015: Best Actor (nominated)
2. Los Angeles Film Critics Association – 2015: Best Actor (won)
3. Online Film Critics Society – 2015: Best Actor (won)
4. Austin Film Critics Association – 2015: Best Actor (won)
5. Satellite Award – 2015: Best Actor (nominated)
6. Screen Actors Guild Award – 2015: Outstanding Performance for an Actor in a Lead Role (nominated)
7. Golden Globe Award – 2015: Best Actor – Motion Picture Drama (nominated)
8. Houston Film Critics Society – 2015: Best Actor (won)
9. Critics' Choice Movie Award – 2015: Best Actor (nominated)

Award	Category	Result
Hunger (2008)		7 wins, 10 nominations
Stockholm International Film Festival	Best Actor	Won
Festival du nouveau cinéma	Acting Award	Won
European Film Award	Best Actor	Nominated
Evening Standard British Film Award	Best Actor	Nominated
Chicago International Film Festival	Silver Hugo for Best Actor	Won
British Independent Film Award	Best Actor	Won
Toronto Film Critics Association	Best Actor	Nominated
London Film Critics' Circle	British Actor of the Year	Won
Irish Film & Television Academy	Best Actor in a Lead Role in a Film	Won
The Devil's Whore (2008)		0 wins, 1 nomination
Irish Film & Television Academy	Best Actor in a Supporting Role in Television	Nominated
Fish Tank (2009)		2 wins, 5 nominations
Chicago International Film Festival	Gold Plaque for Best Supporting Actor	Won
British Independent Film Award	Best Supporting Actor	Nominated
London Film Critics' Circle	British Supporting Actor of the Year	Won
Irish Film & Television Academy	Best Actor in a Supporting Role in a Film	Nominated
Inglourious Basterds (2009)		5 wins, 5 nominations
Screen Actors Guild Award	Outstanding Performance by a Cast in a Motion Picture	Won
Critics' Choice Movie Award	Best Acting Ensemble	Won
Phoenix Film Critics Society	Best Cast	Won
San Diego Film Critics Society	Best Performance by an Ensemble	Won
X-Men: First Class (2011)		5 wins, 10 nominations
Scream Award	Best Fantasy Actor	Nominated
Scream Award	Breakout Performance – Male	Nominated
Scream Award	Best Ensemble	Nominated
IGN Award	Best Ensemble Cast	Won
IGN Award	Best Villain	Won
People's Choice Award	Favorite Ensemble Movie Cast	Nominated
National Board of Review	Spotlight Award	Won
Los Angeles Film Critics Association	Best Actor	Won
Jane Eyre (2011)		3 wins, 4 nominations
Los Angeles Film Critics Association	Best Actor	Won
National Board of Review	Spotlight Award	Won
A Dangerous Method (2011)		4 wins, 6 nominations
Genie Award	Best Actor in a Leading Role	Nominated
London Film Critics' Circle	British Actor of the Year	Won
Los Angeles Film Critics Association	Best Actor	Won
National Board of Review	Spotlight Award	Won
Shame (2011)		19 wins, 36 nominations
Venice Film Festival	Volpi Cup for Best Actor	Won
British Independent Film Award	Best Actor	Won
Seville European Film Festival	Best Actor	Won
National Board of Review	Spotlight Award	Won
Satellite Award	Best Actor in a Motion Picture	Nominated
Chicago Film Critics Association	Best Actor	Nominated
Washington D.C. Area Film Critics Association	Best Actor	Nominated
Houston Film Critics Society	Best Actor	Won
Detroit Film Critics Society	Best Actor	Won
Los Angeles Film Critics Association	Best Actor	Won
Florida Film Critics Circle	Best Actor	Won
St. Louis Gateway Film Critics Association	Best Actor	Nominated
Phoenix Film Critics Society	Best Actor	Nominated
Online Film Critics Society	Best Actor	Won
Critics' Choice Movie Award	Best Actor	Nominated
Golden Globe Award	Best Actor – Motion Picture Drama	Nominated
London Film Critics' Circle	British Actor of the Year	Won
London Film Critics' Circle	Actor of the Year	Nominated
Capri Hollywood International Film Festival	Best Actor	Won
Vancouver Film Critics Circle	Best Actor	Won
IndieWire Critics Survey	Best Lead Performance	Won
Denver Film Critics Society	Best Actor	Nominated
Village Voice Film Poll	Best Actor	Nominated
Toronto Film Critics Association	Best Actor	Nominated
Irish Film & Television Academy	Best Actor in a Lead Role in a Film	Won
Alliance of Women Film Journalists Award	Best Actor	Won
Gay and Lesbian Entertainment Critics Association	Film Performance of the Year	Nominated
Gay and Lesbian Entertainment Critics Association	Rising Star	Won
AACTA Award	Best Actor	Nominated
BAFTA Award	Best Actor	Nominated
Richard Attenborough UK Regional Film Award	Best Actor	Won
Evening Standard British Film Award	Best Actor	Won
European Film Award	European Actor 2012	Nominated
Prometheus (2012)		0 wins, 2 nominations
London Film Critics' Circle	Supporting Actor of the Year	Nominated
Saturn Award	Best Supporting Actor	Nominated
12 Years a Slave (2013)		6 wins, 23 nominations
Independent Spirit Award	Best Supporting Male	Nominated
Golden Globe Award	Best Supporting Actor – Motion Picture	Nominated
London Film Critics' Circle	British Actor of the Year	Nominated
London Film Critics' Circle	Supporting Actor of the Year	Nominated
Screen Actors Guild Award	Outstanding Performance by a Cast in a Motion Picture	Nominated
Screen Actors Guild Award	Outstanding Performance by a Supporting Actor in a Motion Picture	Nominated
Online Film Critics Society	Best Supporting Actor	Won
Chicago Film Critics Association	Best Supporting Actor	Nominated
San Diego Film Critics Society	Best Supporting Actor	Nominated
San Francisco Film Critics Circle	Best Supporting Actor	Nominated
Satellite Award	Best Actor in a Supporting Role	Nominated
Vancouver Film Critics Circle	Best Supporting Actor	Nominated
Washington D.C. Area Film Critics Association	Best Supporting Actor	Nominated
Critics' Choice Movie Award	Best Supporting Actor	Nominated
BAFTA Award	Best Actor in a Supporting Role	Nominated
Academy Award	Best Supporting Actor	Nominated
AACTA Award	Best Supporting Actor	Won
Empire Award	Best Supporting Actor	Won
Irish Film & Television Academy	Best Actor in a Supporting Role in Film	Won
Frank (2014)		0 wins, 3 nominations
British Independent Film Award	Best Supporting Actor	Nominated
Chlotrudis Award	Best Supporting Actor	Nominated
Irish Film & Television Academy	Best Actor in a Lead Role in Film	Nominated
X-Men: Days of Future Past (2014)		1 nomination
Teen Choice Award	Choice Movie Villain	Nominated
Steve Jobs (2015)		1 win
Los Angeles Film Critics Association	Best Actor	Won
