= Leo Burnett Kreasindo Indonesia =

- Company type: Wholly owned subsidiary
- Industry: Advertising agency
- Founded: 2000; 26 years ago
- Headquarters: Jakarta, Indonesia
- Key people: Brian Charles Capel (CEO)
- Parent: Leo Burnett Worldwide
- Website: leoburnett.co.id

Leo Burnett Kreasindo Indonesia, or also known as Leo Burnett Group Indonesia is the Indonesian office of Leo Burnett Worldwide. It is an advertising agency with expertise in advertising, digital, social media, reputation management shopper and retail marketing, activation and direct marketing.

== Overview ==
Leo Burnett Worldwide solidified their relationship with an Indonesian advertising agency PT. Kreasindo Ciptapariwara in 2000 to establish Leo Burnett Kreasindo Indonesia. The Company is currently under the name of PT. Star Reachers Indonesia. Its main office is located in Menara Thamrin, Central Jakarta

== Notable Clients ==
Among their clients are:

- McDonald's
- Coca-Cola
- Procter & Gamble
- Samsung
- Philip Morris
- Telkomsel

== Awards ==
Recent awards:

- Bronze winner of Spikes Asia 2013 in Singapore for "Holding Hands" TV Commercial.
- Grand Prix winner in the category Collateral & POS for the video "Small Currency" at the International Food & Beverage Awards 2013.

Previous awards:

- Silver Winner at the CLIO Awards 2005 for Jordan Dental Floss "Broccoli".
