= WMH =

WMH may refer to:

== Medicine ==
- White matter hyperintensity (leukoaraiosis), an abnormality within the white matter of the brain
- World Mental Health survey initiative, a project by the World Health Organization

== Places ==
- Wayne Memorial Hospital, Goldsboro, North Carolina
- Wayne Memorial Hospital, Honesdale, Pennsylvania
- William & Mary Hall, Williamsburg, Virginia

== Radio stations ==
- WMH (1921–1923), an AM station in Cincinnati, Ohio which operated from 1921-1923
- WKRC (AM), an AM station in Cincinnati, Ohio which was assigned these call letters in 1924-1925

== Other entities ==
- Williams Murray Hamm
