= Michael Fassbender =

German and Irish actor (born 1977)

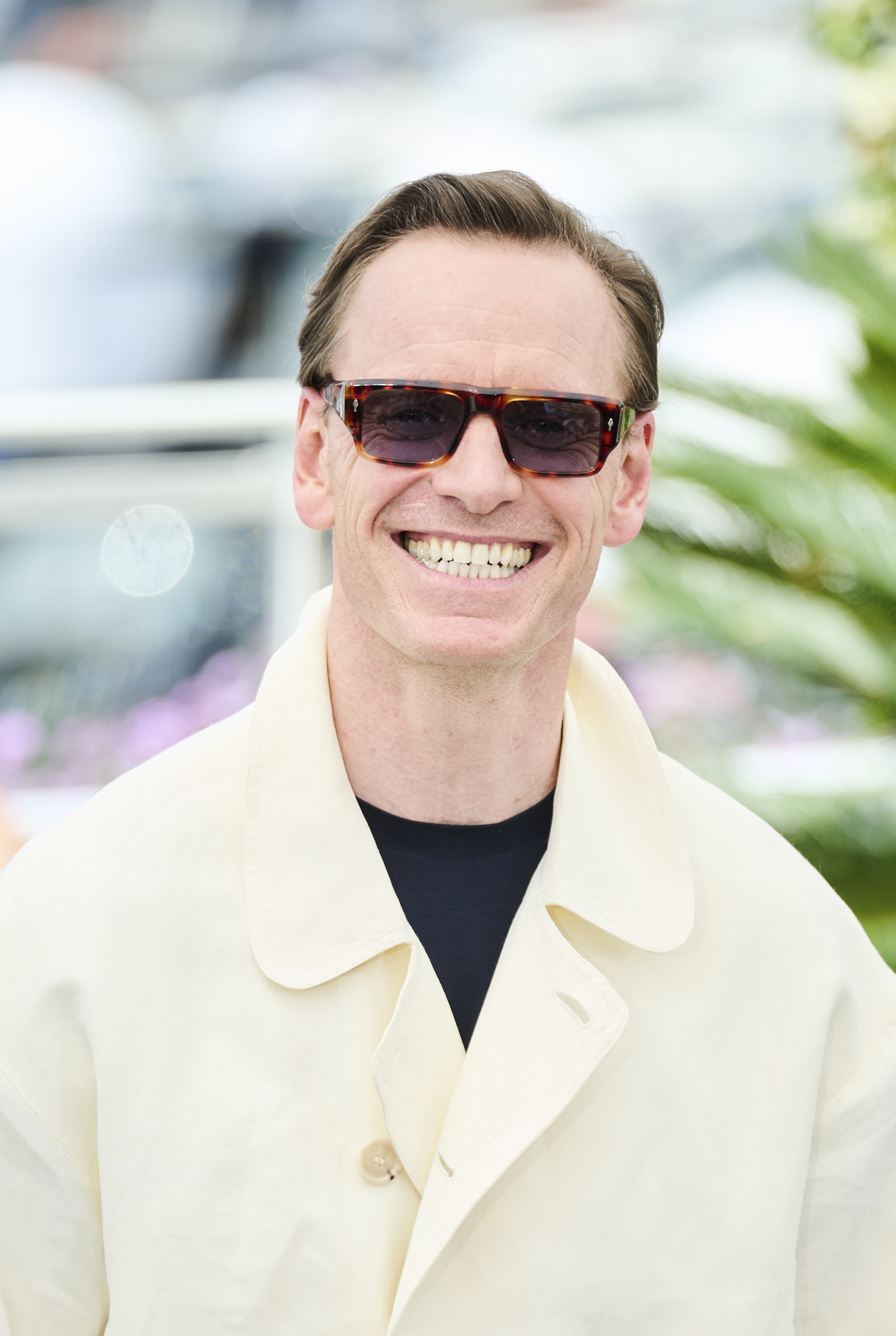
- Fassbender in 2026
- Born: 2 April 1977 (age 49); Heidelberg, West Germany
- Occupations: Actor; racing driver; producer
- Years active: 2001–present
- Works: Full list
- Spouse: Alicia Vikander (m. 2017)
- Children: 2
- Awards: Full list

Michael Fassbender (German pronunciation: [ˈmɪçaʔeːl ˈfasbɛndɐ]; born 2 April 1977) is a German and Irish actor, racing driver and producer. (Note: Fassbender is a German passport holder, who "never got around to" getting an Irish passport. He lived in Ireland until age 19 and has described himself as Irish, saying in 2016, "I definitely still consider myself Irish ... And I'm definitely European.") His accolades include a win for one Volpi Cup and nominations for two Academy Awards, four British Academy Film Awards and three Golden Globe Awards. In 2020, he was listed at number nine on The Irish Times list of Ireland's greatest film actors.

After studying at the Drama Centre London, Fassbender made his feature film debut in 300 (2006). Early roles include in the HBO miniseries Band of Brothers (2001) and the Sky One fantasy drama Hex (2004–2005). He first came to prominence playing Bobby Sands in the drama Hunger (2008). Subsequent roles include the 2009 films Fish Tank and Inglourious Basterds, the 2011 films Jane Eyre and A Dangerous Method, and lead roles in the films The Counselor (2013), Frank (2014), and Macbeth (2015). He gained mainstream success for playing Erik Lehnsherr / Magneto in the X-Men film series (2011–2019), and David 8/Walter One in two installments of the Alien film series (2012–2017).

For his portrayal of a sex addict in Steve McQueen's drama Shame (2011), he won the Volpi Cup for Best Actor. His portrayals of Edwin Epps in the historical drama 12 Years a Slave (2013) and the title role in the biographical drama Steve Jobs (2015), respectively, earned him Academy Award nominations for Best Supporting Actor and Best Actor. He took a four-year acting hiatus after 2019, during which he began competing in auto racing.

After driving for Proton Competition in the European Le Mans Series in 2023, Fassbender made a return to acting with the thrillers The Killer (2023) and Black Bag (2025), as well as starring in the spy series The Agency: Central Intelligence (2024–present). Married to Swedish actress Alicia Vikander since 2017, he has two sons.

== Early life and education ==
Fassbender was born on 2 April 1977 in Heidelberg, Baden-Württemberg, West Germany. His mother, Adele, is from Larne, Northern Ireland, and his father, Josef Fassbender, is German. Fassbender has an elder sister, Catherine, a neuropsychologist. According to lore on her side of family, Adele is the great-grandniece of Michael Collins, an Irish leader during the War of Independence.

When Fassbender was two years old, the family moved to Killarney, County Kerry, Ireland, where his parents were to operate a restaurant named the West End House. Josef also worked as a chef in the restaurant. The couple chose Killarney because they wanted their children to grow up in the countryside, in contrast to the industrial backdrop of their previous German residence.

Raised Catholic, Fassbender served as an altar boy at the church his family attended. He and Catherine spent summer holidays in Germany. He attended Fossa National School in Fossa and St Brendan's College in Killarney. At the age of 17, Fassbender decided to become an actor when he was cast in a play. He left home at the age of 19 to study at the Drama Centre London. In 1999, Fassbender dropped out of the Drama Centre and toured with the Oxford Stage Company to perform the Anton Chekhov play Three Sisters. Before finding steady work as an actor, he worked as a bartender, postman, manual labourer, market researcher for Royal Mail and Dell employee.

== Acting career ==
=== 2001–2005: Television work ===
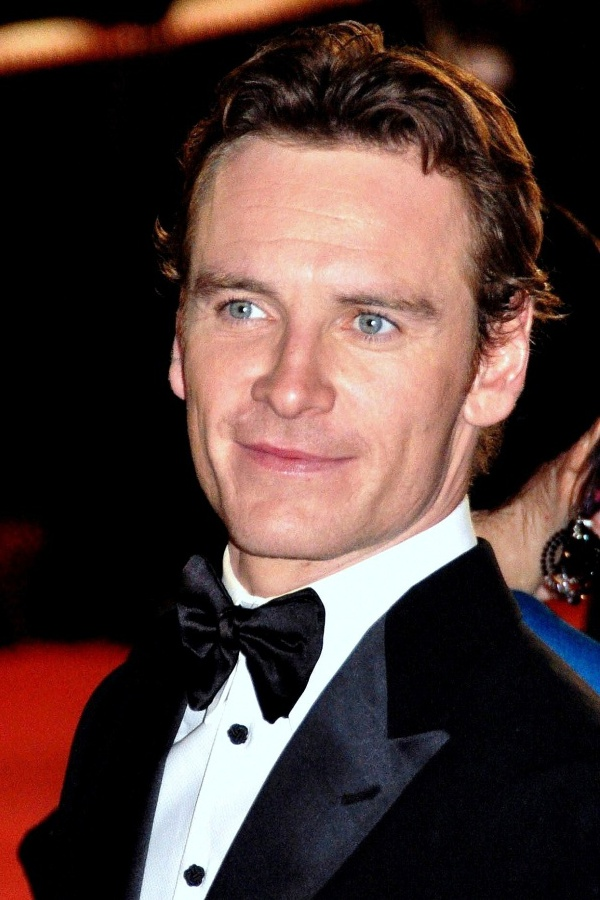
Fassbender at the 2009 Cannes Film Festival

Fassbender's first screen role was as Pat Christenson in Tom Hanks and Steven Spielberg's award-winning television miniseries Band of Brothers (2001). He played Azazeal in both series of Hex on Sky One and starred in the video for the song "Blind Pilots" by the British band The Cooper Temple Clause. In the video, he plays a man out with friends on a stag night who slowly transforms into a goat. In 2003, Fassbender played Jonathan Harker in a ten-part radio serialisation of Dracula produced by BBC Northern Ireland and broadcast in the Book at Bedtime series. He was also seen in early 2004 in a Guinness television commercial, The Quarrel, playing a man who swims across the ocean from Ireland to apologise personally to his brother in New York; this commercial won a gold medal at the 2005 FAB Awards.

On the 2006 Edinburgh Festival Fringe, Fassbender played Michael Collins, his great-great-granduncle, in Allegiance, a play by Mary Kenny based on the meeting between Collins and Winston Churchill. In addition, Fassbender produced, directed, and starred in a stage version of Quentin Tarantino's Reservoir Dogs, along with his production company. He appeared in Angel (UK title: The Real Life of Angel Deverell), about the rise and fall of an eccentric young British writer (played by Romola Garai) in the early 20th century. Fassbender plays her love interest, an average painter named Esmé. The drama—the first English-language effort by French director François Ozon and based on the novel by Elizabeth Taylor—premiered on 17 February 2007 at the Berlin International Film Festival and on 14 March 2007 in Paris. He then made a brief appearance in Dean Cavanagh and Irvine Welsh's Wedding Belles as Barney, speaking with a Scottish accent.

=== 2006–2010: Early film roles ===
In 2006, Fassbender played Stelios, a young Spartan warrior, in 300, a fantasy action film directed by Zack Snyder. The film was a commercial success. In preparation for his role as Provisional Irish Republican Army prisoner Bobby Sands in Steve McQueen's historical drama film Hunger (2008), Fassbender adopted a diet that restricted him to 600 calories a day, weighing 125 pounds (57 kg) as Sands. Regarded as his breakthrough, his performance earned him the British Independent Film Award. Film critic Peter Bradshaw of The Guardian wrote, "As Sands, Fassbender gives another ferociously convincing performance and his emaciated appearance is, finally, almost unwatchable."

In 2009, Fassbender appeared in Quentin Tarantino's revisionist World War II comedy-drama Inglourious Basterds as British officer Archie Hicox. Eric Kohn of IndieWire wrote, "Hell, it's one of the best films of the century. The cast is superb". The same year, Fassbender appeared in the British drama Fish Tank, directed by Andrea Arnold. Fassbender plays the boyfriend of a single mother with two children played by Kierston Wareing. Ray Bennett of The Hollywood Reporter wrote, "Fassbender and Wareing give honest and open performances as the conflicted adults". According to review aggregator Rotten Tomatoes, both films were mostly well-received by critics.

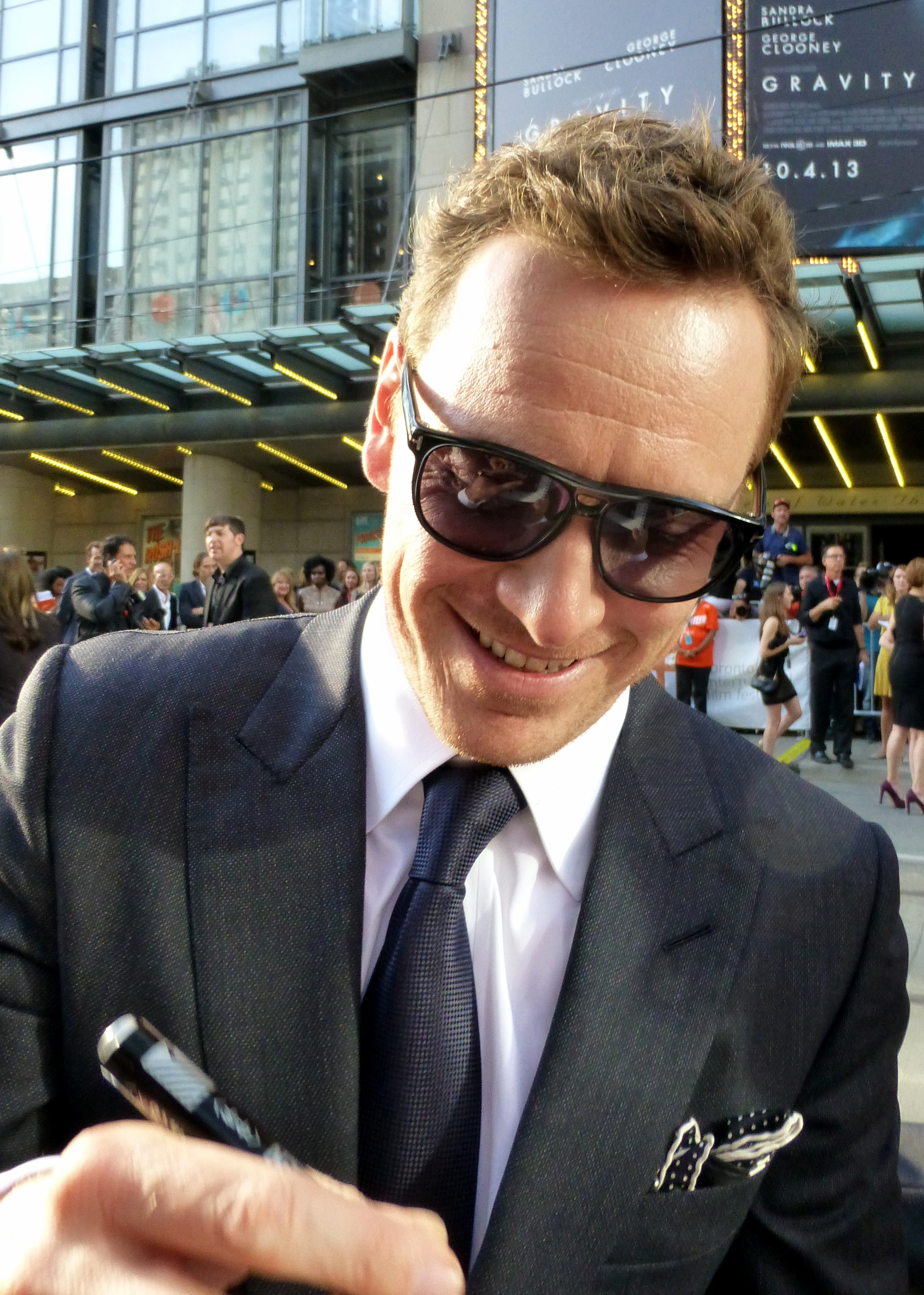
Fassbender at the premiere of 12 Years a Slave, 2013 Toronto International Film Festival

In 2010, Fassbender appeared as Burke in Jonah Hex, a Western film. In an interview at San Diego Comic-Con, a comic book convention, Fassbender said of the role: "I kind of developed this character and really pushed it – I'll see how far I pushed it ... I had this idea about the character, he's kind of psychotic, he gets his kicks in perverted ways. I didn't want to make it very obvious or like something you've seen before." Hex received predominantly negative reviews. Responding to criticism in 2011, Fassbender said: "Pretty awful, was it? I haven't seen it myself." He portrayed Quintus Dias in Neil Marshall's bloody Roman war-thriller-drama film Centurion, and was cast as Richard Wirth in the Joel Schumacher film Blood Creek alongside Dominic Purcell. The story centres on a West Virginia man who helps his brother wipe out a family that had been protecting a Nazi occultist and who had kept his brother captive for him to feed off for years.

=== 2011–2019: Mainstream success ===
2011 was a breakout year for Fassbender. He portrayed Edward Rochester in the period film Jane Eyre, featuring Mia Wasikowska in the title role, with Cary Fukunaga directing. He next portrayed Magneto in the superhero blockbuster X-Men: First Class, the prequel to X-Men. Set in 1962, it focuses on the friendship between Charles Xavier (played by James McAvoy) and Magneto and the origin of their groups, the X-Men and the Brotherhood of Mutants. The film was released on 3 June 2011 to general acclaim and financial success and promoted Fassbender to being more of a popular movie star. In 2011, Fassbender starred in A Dangerous Method by director David Cronenberg, playing Swiss psychiatrist Carl Jung. The film premiered at the 2011 Venice Film Festival. He also starred in Shame, as a man in his thirties struggling with his sexual addiction. Shame reunited him with director Steve McQueen and premiered at the 2011 Venice Film Festival, where Fassbender won the Volpi Cup for Best Actor Award for his portrayal of Brandon. Fassbender was a serious contender for an Academy Award for Best Actor, but he was not nominated, and according to various sources his full-frontal nudity and depiction of sexual encounters inspired voters "to fantasize, and not actually vote". Fassbender achieved critical acclaim for his portrayal in Shame and received nominations for the BAFTA Award for Best Actor in a Leading Role and the Golden Globe Award for Best Actor in a Motion Picture – Drama.

In 2012, he appeared as an MI6 agent in Haywire, an action-thriller directed by Steven Soderbergh, and in Ridley Scott's science fiction film Prometheus. Reviews praised both the film's visual aesthetic design and the acting, most notably Fassbender's performance as the android David 8. Fassbender played the title role in Ridley Scott's The Counselor, a 2013 film based on the Cormac McCarthy script. In 2013, he starred in 12 Years a Slave, his third collaboration with Steve McQueen. Fassbender's portrayal of Edwin Epps earned him an Academy Award nomination for Best Supporting Actor. Fassbender reprised the role of Magneto in X-Men: Days of Future Past (2014), the sequel to X-Men: First Class. Fassbender also stars in the title role of Frank (2014), a comedy loosely inspired by Frank Sidebottom, a comic persona created by English comedian Chris Sievey.

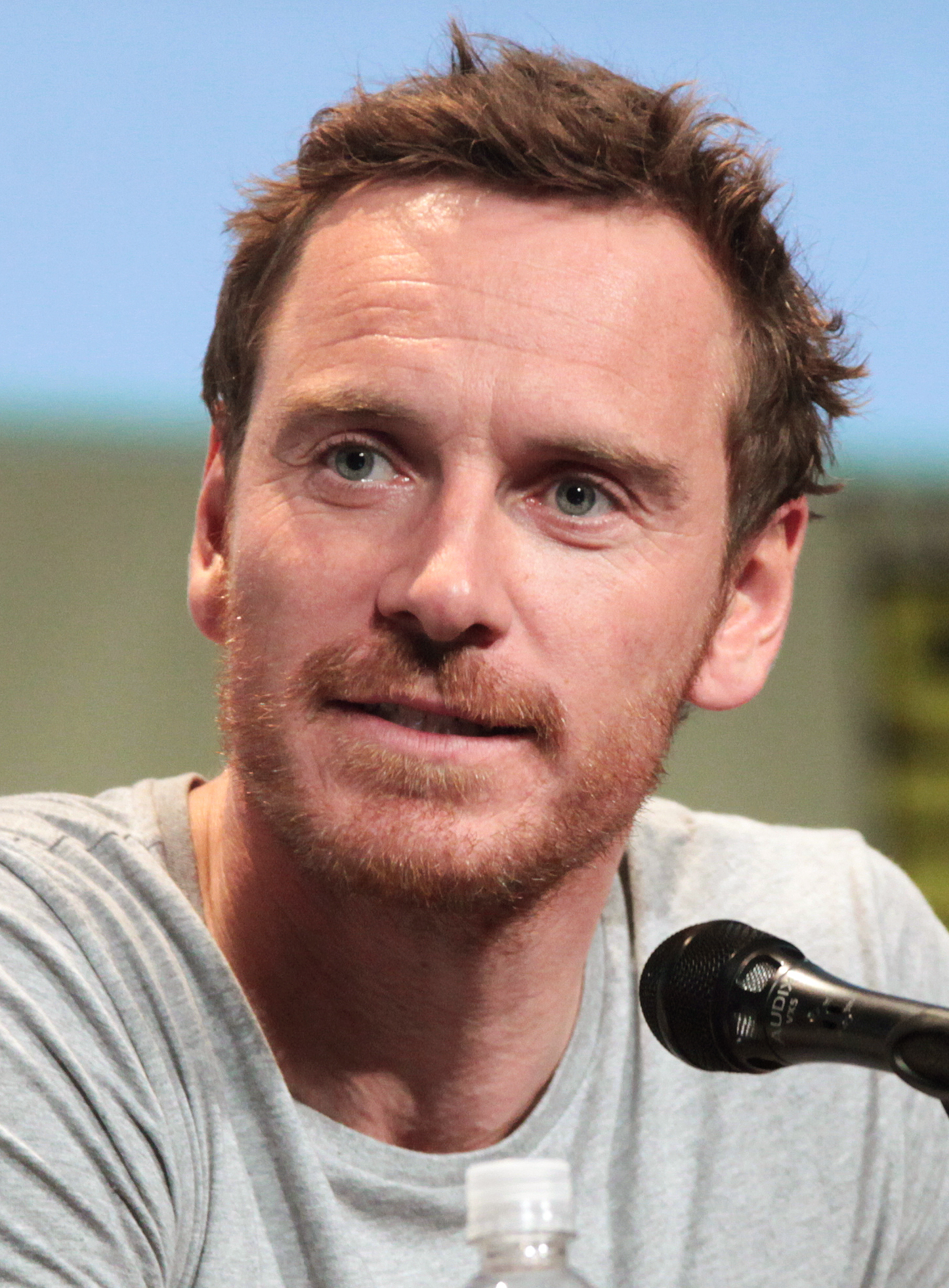
Fassbender in 2015

Fassbender co-starred in Slow West, a western starring Kodi Smit-McPhee and Ben Mendelsohn, in 2015. He played Silas, an enigmatic traveller. Fassbender played late Apple founder and CEO Steve Jobs in the Danny Boyle-directed film Steve Jobs, which began filming in January 2015 in San Francisco, and premiered in September of that year. The film is an adaptation of Walter Isaacson's book Steve Jobs. The screenplay was written by Aaron Sorkin. Fassbender became attached after Christian Bale dropped out of the project. Todd McCarthy of The Hollywood Reporter praised Fassbender writing, "while [he] doesn't closely physically resemble the man, he fully delivers the essentials of how we have come to perceive the man". His performance saw him nominated for the Academy Award, Actor Award, BAFTA Award, Critics' Choice Movie Award, and Golden Globe Award, all for Best Lead Actor.

Fassbender took on the role of Macbeth in a film directed by Justin Kurzel, with Marion Cotillard as Lady Macbeth and David Thewlis as King Duncan. Filming began in January 2014 and the film premiered at the 2015 Cannes Film Festival. In 2016, Fassbender again played Magneto in the film X-Men: Apocalypse. He next starred in The Light Between Oceans, based on the novel by M. L. Stedman, and directed by Derek Cianfrance; the film began filming in New Zealand in September 2014 and was released on 2 September 2016. Also in 2016, Fassbender starred in the thriller Trespass Against Us, with fellow Irishman Brendan Gleeson. His final film of the year was the adaptation of video game Assassin's Creed, which he co-produced through his DMC Film banner. It was released on 21 December 2016. Kurzel directed and Cotillard had a leading role.

In May 2017, Fassbender reprised his role as the android David and played another character in the sequel to Prometheus, Alien: Covenant. In 2015, he was cast as Harry Hole (becoming the first actor ever to portray the character) in The Snowman, an adaptation of Jo Nesbø's novel, directed by Tomas Alfredson and co-starring Rebecca Ferguson and Charlotte Gainsbourg. Filming began in January 2016 and the film was released in October 2017. Fassbender reprised his role as Magneto in the 2019 film Dark Phoenix, which garnered unfavorable reviews and had a commercially unsuccessful theatrical run.

=== 2020–present: Acting hiatus and return ===
After a four-year absence during which Fassbender pursued auto racing, he returned to film acting in David Fincher's action thriller The Killer (2023), which premiered at the Venice International Film Festival. Peter Bradshaw of The Guardian wrote, "Fassbender is perfect in the main role of a yoga-loving assassin". The same year he starred in Next Goal Wins, directed by Taika Waititi, based upon the documentary of the same name. Fassbender also helped produce The Kitchen, a dystopian drama for Netflix, written by Daniel Kaluuya and Joe Murtagh.

In 2024, Fassbender began starring in the action thriller series The Agency for Paramount+, and played a supporting role in the Irish comedy-drama Kneecap. In 2025, he starred opposite Cate Blanchett in Steven Soderbergh's spy thriller film Black Bag, which received critical acclaim. He also stars alongside his wife Alicia Vikander and Taylor Russell in Na Hong-jin's 2025 thriller Hope and alongside Arnold Schwarzenegger and David Hasselhoff in the martial arts comedy feature Kung Fury 2, a sequel to the 2015 short film. Principal photography on Kung Fury 2 was completed by 2019, but legal issues have so far prevented the film's release.

== Auto racing ==
Michael Fassbender
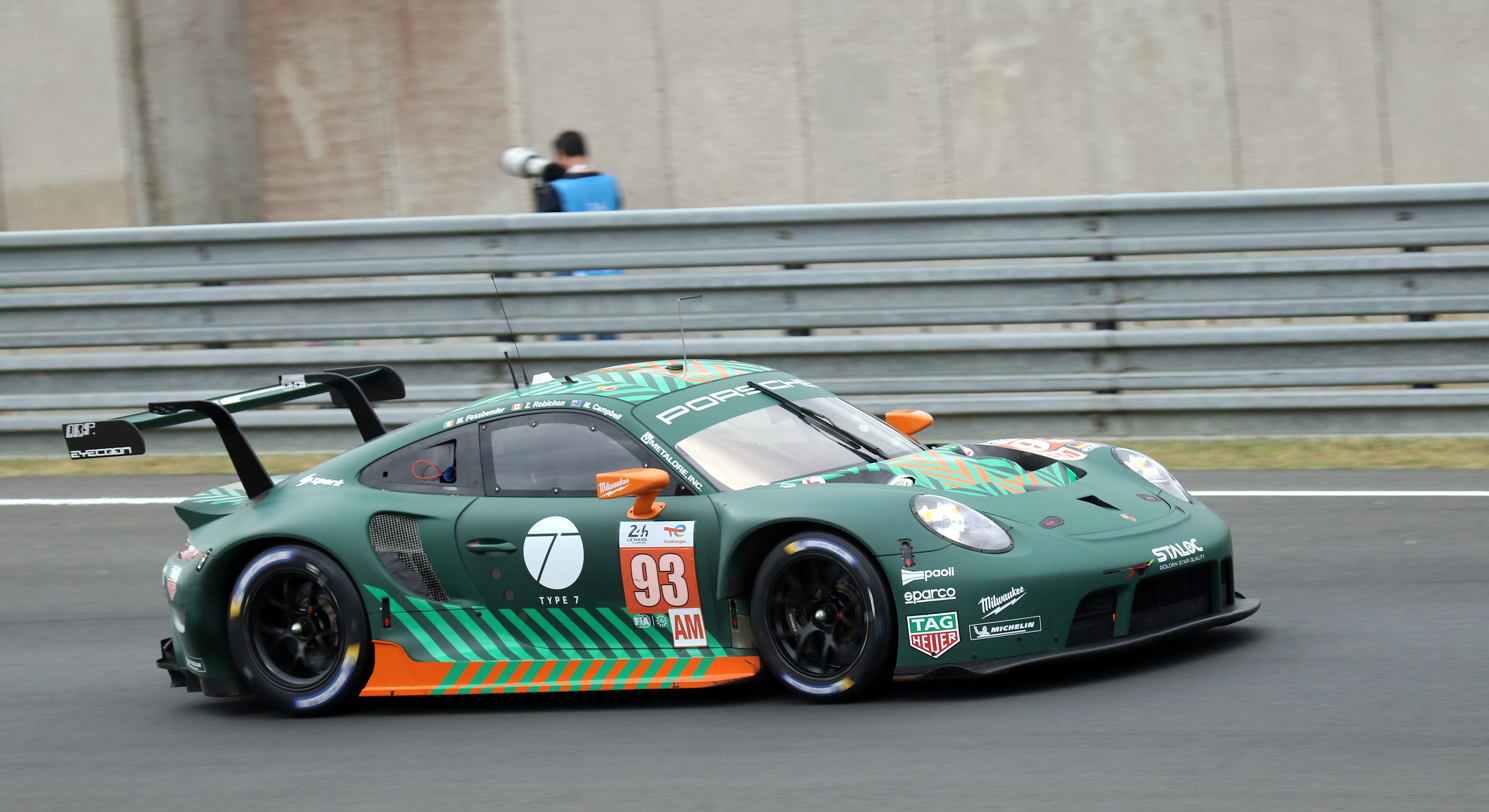
- Fassbender at the 2022 Le Mans 24 Hours
- Nationality: (Republic of Ireland) Irish

European Le Mans Series career
- Debut season: 2020
- Current team: Proton Competition
- Categorisation: FIA Bronze
- Car number: 93
- Engine: Porsche
- Starts: 22
- Championships: 0
- Wins: 0
- Podiums: 3
- Poles: 2
- Fastest laps: 0
- Best finish: 5th in 2021

Previous series
- 2020-2021 2019 2017–2018: Porsche Supercup; Porsche Driving Experience; Ferrari Challenge

Fassbender has expressed an interest in motorsport since his youth, stating in 2020, "Even before I started acting, I had a big dream to go racing." A fan of Formula One and Scuderia Ferrari, he was a member of the team's Corso Pilota training course in 2016.

Fassbender began racing in the Ferrari Challenge's Coppa Shell class in May 2017, finishing 15th in his debut at Mugello Circuit. He also raced in the Challenge's North American division, finishing sixth at Mazda Raceway Laguna Seca. In 2018, he ran the full Ferrari Challenge North America schedule, winning the season opener at Daytona International Speedway and finishing fifth in the standings.

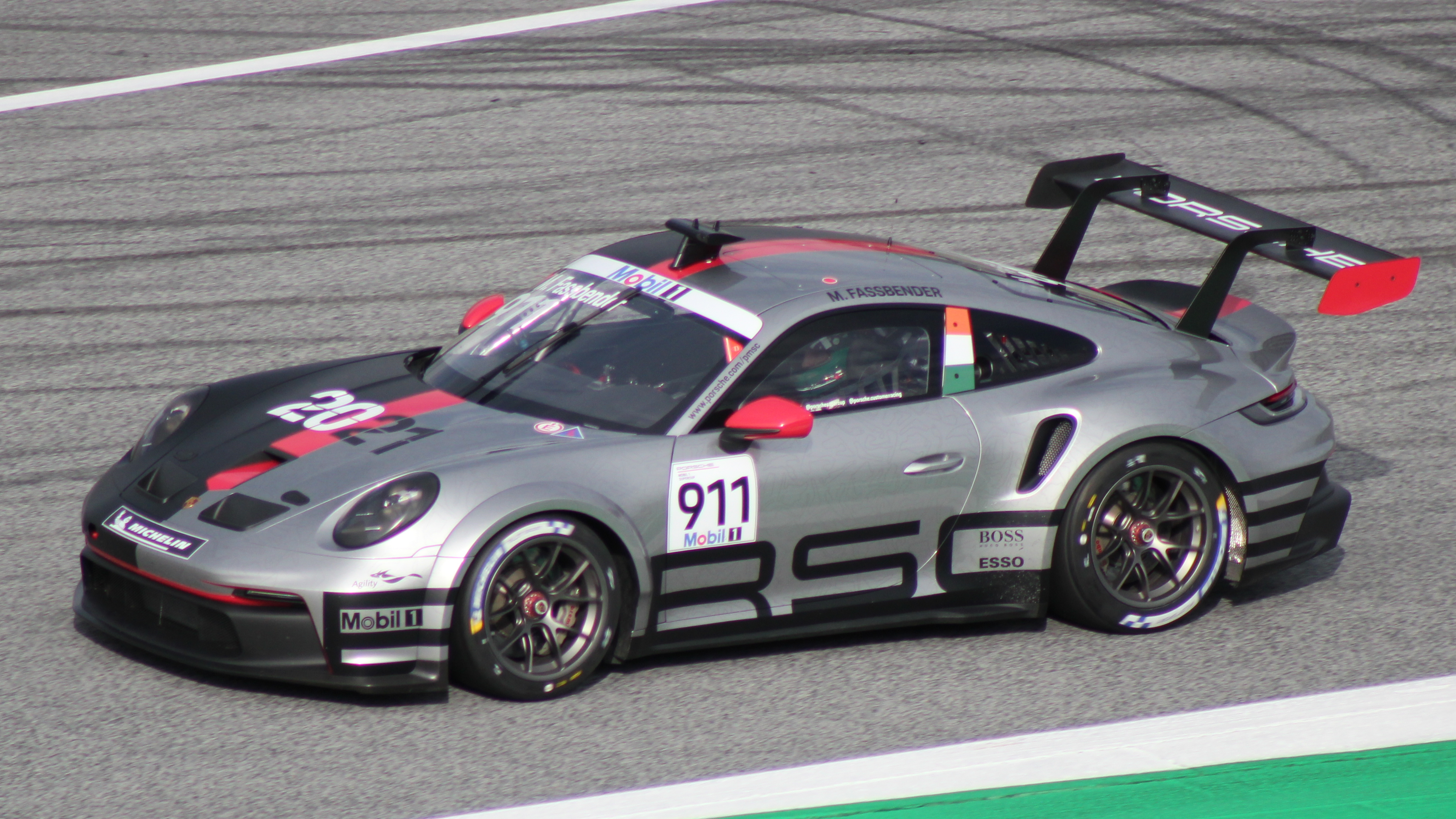
Fassbender driving at the Red Bull Ring during the 2021 Porsche Supercup season

Fassbender moved to Porsche in 2019, competing in Porsche Carrera Cup Germany with the German Porsche Racing Experience and being the subject of a YouTube series by Porsche, called Road to Le Mans. The next year, he joined Proton Competition for the full 2020 European Le Mans Series, sharing a 2017 Porsche 911 RSR with Richard Lietz and Felipe Fernández Laser. Later in the year, Fassbender raced a guest car in the Porsche Supercup at Circuit de Barcelona-Catalunya and was involved in a startline crash putting him out of the race within seconds.

In 2021, Fassbender continued to race with Proton Competition in the European Le Mans Series. Fassbender and his co-drivers scored fourth-place finishes at the Red Bull Ring and at Spa-Francorchamps, before achieving his best-ever finish and his first podium at the last race at Portimão, finishing second behind the No. 80 Iron Lynx, eventual LMGTE champion. The team finished fourth in the LMGTE teams championship, with 61 points.

=== Complete European Le Mans Series results ===
(key) (Races in bold indicate pole position; results in italics indicate fastest lap)

Year	Entrant	Class	Chassis	Engine	1	2	3	4	5	6	Rank	Points
2020	Proton Competition	LMGTE	Porsche 911 RSR	Porsche 4.0 L Flat-6	LEC; 7	**SPA**; 4	LEC; DNS	MNZ; 5	ALG; 4		6th	47
2021	Proton Competition	LMGTE	Porsche 911 RSR-19	Porsche 4.2 L Flat-6	CAT; 6	RBR; 4	LEC; 8	MNZ; 7	**SPA**; 4	ALG; 2	5th	61
2022	Proton Competition	LMGTE	Porsche 911 RSR-19	Porsche 4.2 L Flat-6	LEC; 3	IMO; 7	MNZ; Ret	CAT; 8	SPA; 7	ALG; 8	14th	35
2023	Proton Competition	LMGTE	Porsche 911 RSR-19	Porsche 4.2 L Flat-6	CAT; 8	LEC; 10	ARA; 3	SPA; Ret	ALG; 9	ALG; 11	13th	22

=== Complete 24 Hours of Le Mans results ===
Year	Team	Co-drivers	Car	Class	Laps	Pos.	Class pos.
2022	(Germany) Proton Competition	(Australia) Matt Campbell (Canada) Zacharie Robichon	Porsche 911 RSR-19	LMGTE; Am	329	51st	16th
2023	(Germany) Proton Competition	(Austria) Richard Lietz (Estonia) Martin Rump	Porsche 911 RSR-19	LMGTE; Am	246	DNF	DNF

== Personal life ==
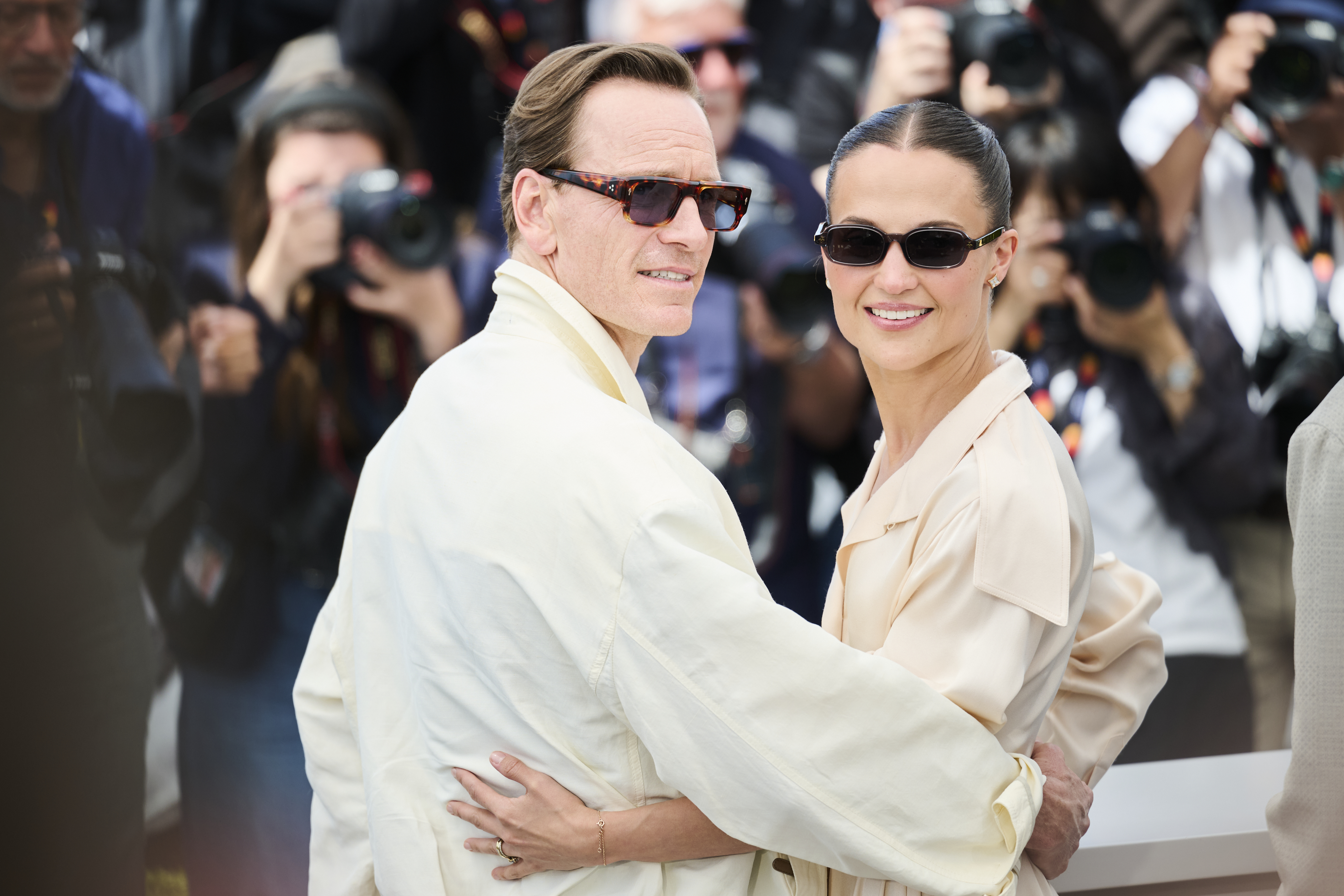
Fassbender and Alicia Vikander at the 2026 Cannes Film Festival

In June 2012, Fassbender told GQ magazine that he was dating American actress Nicole Beharie, with whom he had worked on Shame. In December 2014, he began dating Swedish actress Alicia Vikander, with whom he had worked on The Light Between Oceans. They married in Ibiza on 14 October 2017 and have two sons. They moved to Portugal in 2017 and purchased a home in the Alfama district of Lisbon. Fassbender sold the property in the Hackney area of London he had lived in since 1996.

Fassbender is known for preferring to keep his personal life private. He has said that he was an altar boy as a child and is now a lapsed Catholic, but still goes to church to light candles. He is a lifelong supporter of Liverpool F.C.. He holds a German passport, and has said he intended to get an Irish passport "for years and just never got around to it". He speaks German, but said he needed to brush up on it before filming Inglourious Basterds. He has expressed interest in performing in a German-language film or play.

In 2010, Fassbender's ex-girlfriend Sunawin Andrews accused him of two incidents of domestic abuse that had occurred the previous year. News reports cited a court petition and a restraining order Andrews filed alleging that Fassbender was screaming at her while driving recklessly; after she got out of the car, he allegedly drove forward and dragged her alongside it. This resulted in a hospital visit to treat "a twisted left ankle, blown out left knee cap, and a [burst] ovarian cyst", and "lots of internal bleeding". The second incident came when he allegedly returned to their hotel room from a film festival, inebriated and accompanied by a friend, and the two men tried to get into bed with her; after checking into another room for the night, she alleges that he threw her over a chair and broke her nose when she tried to wake him up after finding him asleep in his own urine. He has not publicly addressed the allegations, which resurfaced during the #MeToo movement in 2017.

== Acting credits and accolades ==
Fassbender has been recognised by the Academy of Motion Picture Arts and Sciences for two performances:

- 86th Academy Awards (2013): nomination for Best Supporting Actor, as Edwin Epps in 12 Years a Slave
- 88th Academy Awards (2015): nomination for Best Actor, as Steve Jobs in Steve Jobs

Fassbender has received an Actor Award, a Critics' Choice Movie Award, and the Venice International Film Festival's Volpi Cup for Best Actor. He has also received nominations for four BAFTAs, three Golden Globe Awards, and two European Film Awards.

== See also ==
- List of Academy Award winners and nominees from Ireland
