= The FAB Awards =

International food and beverage brands awards programme

FAB Awards logo

Established in 1998, the FAB Awards is an international awards program that focuses on food and beverage brands.

Some of the brands that have won the FAB Award include McDonald's, Coca-Cola, Skittles, James Ready Beer, Heineken, and Arla Foods.

Agencies that have previously won the FAB plate include BBDO, JWT, Leo Burnett, DDB, McCann Erickson, Razorfish, TBWA, Ogilvy & Mather, Lewis Moberly, Design Bridge, Pearlfisher, Landor, Turner Duckworth and Williams Murray Hamm.

== Awards ==
The Hurlingham Club in London has hosted the FAB Awards ceremony for all 21 years of its existence.

The ceremony, which usually takes place in May, is a formal event that includes dinner and drinks. It is attended by nominees, industry personalities, past judges, and other select invitees.

The ceremony showcases all the nominated work and hands out the awards to the respective winners. From 2016 onward all nominees were awarded Silver Awards.

There are two types of awards that can be won.

=== FAB Award ===
This is equivalent to a 'Gold' in other major award ceremonies. There can be multiple FABs across a single category.

=== Fabulous Award ===
These are the grand winners on the night and are awarded over a family of categories, such as Traditional Advertising (TV, Press, Posters, etc.) or Digital Advertising (Online, Website, Social Media, Viral, etc.)

A project must have won a FAB Award on the night to be considered for a Fabulous Award.

== FAB Brand of the Year ==
Introduced in 2013, this award is handed out to the brand that fares the best in the judging session. This includes the number of nominations, FAB, and Fabulous Awards it wins. This is also the only award that is announced before the actual awards ceremony. In 2015 and 2016, this award was sponsored by Google UK, with YouTube sponsoring it in 2017 and 2018.

=== Previous winners ===
Year	Brand
2018	Mars, Incorporated
2017	McDonald's
2016	Mars, Incorporated
2015	Mars, Incorporated
2014	Kit Kat
2013	McDonald's

== FAB Agency of the Year ==
Similar to the Brand of the Year Award, this award is given to the agency that performed the best during the judging session. The award was introduced in 2000. This award was also sponsored by Google UK in 2015 and 2016 with YouTube sponsoring it in 2017 and 2018.

Points are handed out for nominations, FAB Awards, and Fabulous Awards. The agency that amasses the most points is named Agency of the Year.

=== Previous winners ===
The following are the agencies that have won the Agency of the Year Award:

Year	Agency
2018	BBDO New York
2017	BBDO New York
2016	AMV BBDO London
2015	AMV BBDO London
2014	AMV BBDO London
2013	JWT London
2012	BBDO Toronto
2011	AMV BBDO London
2010	BBDO New York
2009	Williams Murray Hamm, London
2008	Turner Duckworth London & San Francisco
2007	AMV BBDO London
2006	AMV BBDO London
2005	BBDO New York
2004	CHI Advertising, London
2003	JWT London
2002	Leo Burnett Worldwide
2001	Adam&Eve DDB London
2000	JWT New York

== FAB Design Agency of the Year ==
Similar to the Agency of the Year Award, this award is given to the design house that performed the best during the judging session. The award was introduced in 2016.

Points are handed out for nominations, FAB Awards and Fabulous Awards. The agency that amasses the most points is named Design Agency of the Year.

=== Previous winners ===
The following are the design houses that have won the Design Agency of the Year Award:

Year	Agency
2018	Design Bridge & Turner Duckworth
2017	Jones Knowles Ritchie
2016	Horse

== FAB Food Fight ==
In 2013, The FAB Awards along with WCRS published seven print ads to promote the 15th edition of the awards. That was the first time FAB ran an advertising campaign to promote the event.

The campaign was created by former FAB winner and WCRS creative Naz Nazli. Nazli came up with the idea while judging the awards in 2011.

== 20 Years Young Campaign ==
To mark their 20th Anniversary, The FAB Awards unveiled a new campaign by Creative Directors, Naz Nazli and Alex Ball with the tag line “20 Years Young”.

Photographed by Andy Gallacher, it features some of the leading personalities from the Marketing, Design, and Advertising Industry, who have either picked up the FAB plate or have judged the program during its 20-year history.

The likes of Mary Lewis, Rodanthi Senduka, Graham Shearsby, Rosie Arnold, Bjorn Stahl, Peter Ignazi, Russell Ramsey, Karen Welman, Garrick Hamm, Paul Brazier, Donald Gunn and Michael Conrad (to name a few) are showcased in their youthful splendor, highlighting FAB's continued support from the cream of the Marketing, Design and Advertising Industry.
