= 21st Empire Awards =

2016 British film awards ceremony

- Date: 20 March 2016
- Site: London, England
- Hosted by: David Walliams
- Directed by: J. J. Abrams

Highlights
- Best Film: The Revenant
- Best British Film: Spectre
- Most awards: Star Wars: The Force Awakens (5)
- Most nominations: Mad Max: Fury Road (10)

The 21st Empire Awards ceremony (officially known as the Jameson Empire Awards), presented by the British film magazine Empire, honored the best films of 2015 and took place on 20 March 2016 in London, England. Star Wars: The Force Awakens was the most awarded film with five winnings, including Best Director. Other winners included Mad Max: Fury Road, with four awards, and the two times winner Spectre. The honorary awards were given to Alan Rickman, Stanley Tucci and Paddy Considine.

== Winners and nominees ==
Winners are listed first and highlighted in boldface.

**Best Film**: **The Revenant**; The Hateful Eight; Mad Max: Fury Road; The Martian; Star Wars: The Force Awakens	**Best British Film**: **Spectre**; 45 Years; Legend; Macbeth; Suffragette
**Best Director**: **J. J. Abrams — Star Wars: The Force Awakens**; Ryan Coogler — Creed; Alejandro G. Iñárritu — The Revenant; George Miller — Mad Max: Fury Road; Ridley Scott — The Martian	**Best Screenplay**: **Adam McKay, Charles Randolph — The Big Short**; Quentin Tarantino — The Hateful Eight; Tom McCarthy, Josh Singer — Spotlight; Aaron Sorkin — Steve Jobs; Amy Schumer — Trainwreck
**Best Actor**: **Matt Damon — The Martian**; Leonardo DiCaprio — The Revenant; Michael Fassbender — Macbeth & Steve Jobs; Tom Hardy — Legend & Mad Max: Fury Road; Michael B. Jordan — Creed	**Best Actress**: **Alicia Vikander — The Danish Girl**; Emily Blunt — Sicario; Brie Larson — Room; Jennifer Lawrence — The Hunger Games: Mockingjay – Part 2; Charlize Theron — Mad Max: Fury Road
**Best Male Newcomer**: **John Boyega — Star Wars: The Force Awakens**; Abraham Attah — Beasts of No Nation; Thomas Mann — Me and Earl and the Dying Girl; Jason Mitchell — Straight Outta Compton; Jacob Tremblay — Room	**Best Female Newcomer**: **Daisy Ridley — Star Wars: The Force Awakens**; Olivia Cooke — Me and Earl and the Dying Girl; Rebecca Ferguson — Mission: Impossible – Rogue Nation; Maika Monroe — It Follows; Bel Powley — The Diary of a Teenage Girl
**Best Comedy**: **Spy**; Ant-Man; Me and Earl and the Dying Girl; Trainwreck; Inside Out	**Best Horror**: **The Hallow**; Crimson Peak; Insidious: Chapter 3; It Follows; Krampus
**Best Sci-Fi/Fantasy**: **Star Wars: The Force Awakens**; The Hunger Games: Mockingjay – Part 2; Jurassic World; Mad Max: Fury Road; The Martian	**Best Thriller**: **Spectre**; Bridge Of Spies; The Gift; Mission: Impossible – Rogue Nation; Sicario
**Best Animated Film**: **Inside Out**; Minions; Shaun the Sheep Movie; Song of the Sea; The Tale of the Princess Kaguya	**Best Documentary**: **Amy**; Going Clear: Scientology and the Prison of Belief; He Named Me Malala; The Jinx: The Life and Deaths of Robert Durst; Making a Murderer
**Best Short Film**: **World of Tomorrow**; Kung Fury; Lava; Sanjay's Super Team; Stutterer	**Best Soundtrack**: **Mad Max: Fury Road**; The Hateful Eight; The Martian; Sicario; Straight Outta Compton
**Best Production Design**: **Mad Max: Fury Road**; Crimson Peak; The Hunger Games: Mockingjay – Part 2; The Martian; Star Wars: The Force Awakens	**Best Costume Design**: **Mad Max: Fury Road**; Carol; Cinderella; Crimson Peak; Star Wars: The Force Awakens
**Best Makeup and Hair Styling**: **Mad Max: Fury Road**; Crimson Peak; The Danish Girl; The Revenant; Star Wars: The Force Awakens	**Best Visual Effects**: **Star Wars: The Force Awakens**; Ant-Man; Jurassic World; Mad Max: Fury Road; The Revenant
**Best TV Series**: **This Is England '90**; Marvel's Daredevil; Fargo; Game of Thrones; Marvel's Jessica Jones	**Best Game**: **Batman: Arkham Knight**; Bloodborne; Fallout 4; Metal Gear Solid V: The Phantom Pain; The Witcher 3: Wild Hunt
**Honorary Awards**: Empire Hero Award: **Stanley Tucci**; Empire Inspiration Award: **Paddy Considine**; Empire Legend Award: **Alan Rickman**

=== Multiple awards ===
The following films received multiple awards:

Awards	Film
5	Star Wars: The Force Awakens
4	Mad Max: Fury Road
2	Spectre

=== Multiple nominations ===
The following films received multiple nominations:

Awards	Film
10	Mad Max: Fury Road
9	Star Wars: The Force Awakens
6	The Martian
5	The Revenant
4	Crimson Peak
3	Me and Earl and the Dying Girl
3	Sicario
3	The Hateful Eight
3	The Hunger Games: Mockingjay – Part 2
2	Ant-Man
2	Creed
2	Inside Out
2	It Follows
2	Jurassic World
2	Legend
2	Macbeth
2	Mission: Impossible – Rogue Nation
2	Room
2	Spectre
2	Steve Jobs
2	Straight Outta Compton
2	The Danish Girl
2	Trainwreck
