= Leo Burnett Worldwide =

American advertising company

Leo Burnett Worldwide, Inc.
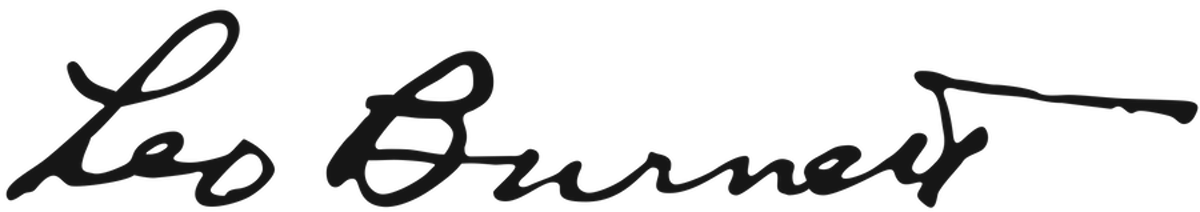
- Type: Subsidiary
- Industry: Advertising
- Founded: August 5, 1935; 91 years ago
- Founder: Leo Burnett
- Headquarters: Leo Burnett Building; Chicago, Illinois, United States
- Number of locations: 85 offices worldwide
- Number of employees: 9,000+
- Parent: Publicis Groupe
- Divisions: Arc Worldwide; ROKKAN; Turner Duckworth
- Website: leoburnett.com

Leo Burnett Worldwide, Inc., also known as Leo Burnett Company, Inc., is an American advertising company, founded on August 5, 1935, in Chicago by Leo Burnett.

In September 2002, the company was acquired by Publicis Groupe, the world's third largest advertising agency holding group and one of the largest agency networks.

== History ==
Leo Burnett Company, Inc., was founded on August 5, 1935, in Chicago by Leo Burnett, who had three accounts to start. In 1944, the agency opened a branch office in New York City. In February 1967, the founder transferred all of his voting stock to a charitable organization, by which time, billings were then "nearing $250 million".

On March 20, 1967, the agency completed its acquisition of D.P. Brother & Co.

On June 8, 1971, founder Leo Burnett died at the age of 79. During the early 1990s, Leo Burnett Worldwide operated a regional design group in Hong Kong as part of its international expansion into the Asia‑Pacific market. Among the designers who worked in the Hong Kong office was Austrian graphic designer Stefan Sagmeister, who joined the firm in 1991 and remained there until 1993, contributing to creative work for regional advertising clients and industry awards.

On November 3, 1999, Burnett and D'Arcy Masius Benton & Bowles announced the creation of BDM. BDM was quickly renamed Bcom3. Roy Bostock was named chairman and Roger Haupt was named CEO.

In 2000, Leo Burnett Kreasindo Indonesia is founded. In September 2002, Bcom3 was acquired by Publicis Groupe.

Brazil-based independent advertising agency Tailor Made was acquired by Publicis in 2011 and merged with Leo Burnett Brazil to form Leo Burnett Tailor Made. At that time, clients included Fiat, Procter & Gamble, Emirates and Chrysler.

Andrew Swinand became CEO in 2017.

== Clients ==
=== Foods ===
The Pillsbury Doughboy was created for the Pillsbury Company by Rudy Perz, a copywriter for Leo Burnett.

Agency employee Tom Rogers created the character Charlie the Tuna for StarKist Tuna. The ad campaign added the phrase "Sorry, Charlie" to the American lexicon. StarKist still uses the spokesfish to represent the brand.

StarKist's relationship with the Leo Burnett Company began in 1958 and continued after Heinz bought StarKist in 1963. For Heinz, the agency produced a series of television ads emphasizing the thickness of their ketchup brand, including a memorable ad featuring the Carly Simon song "Anticipation".

The Jolly Green Giant and Sprout advertising icons came out of the agency. The Minnesota Valley Canning Company originally created the Jolly Green giant character as a large, cave-man looking character to draw attention to the size of their Le Sueur peas. The Leo Burnett agency was hired to make the Jolly Green Giant more friendly-looking. In 1972, the Jolly Green Giant was joined by Sprout to appeal to children.

Hamburger giant McDonald's began operations in India in 1996 and recruited Leo Burnett (India).

=== Other products ===
In 1961, the agency created the "Dependability" campaign for the Maytag brand. The campaign featured actual consumer testimonials on the reliability of their appliances. The campaign evolved into a radio call-in show in Canada where an appliance repairman would offer advice to customers. In 1967, the 'Ol Lonely character debuted on television. Jesse White played the role of the lonely Maytag repairman until 1989 when he was replaced by actor Gordon Jump.

The agency guided Philip Morris (now part of Altria Group) in building Marlboro into a global brand, with an emphasis on manliness as typified by the image of the Marlboro Man on the American Frontier. Previously the brand was "a feminine brand."

Burnett created the popular brand mascot Morris the Cat for 9Lives cat food. Several dozen television commercials featuring the "finicky" eater were produced from 1969 until Burnett ended their relationship with parent company Heinz in 1994.

== Controversy ==
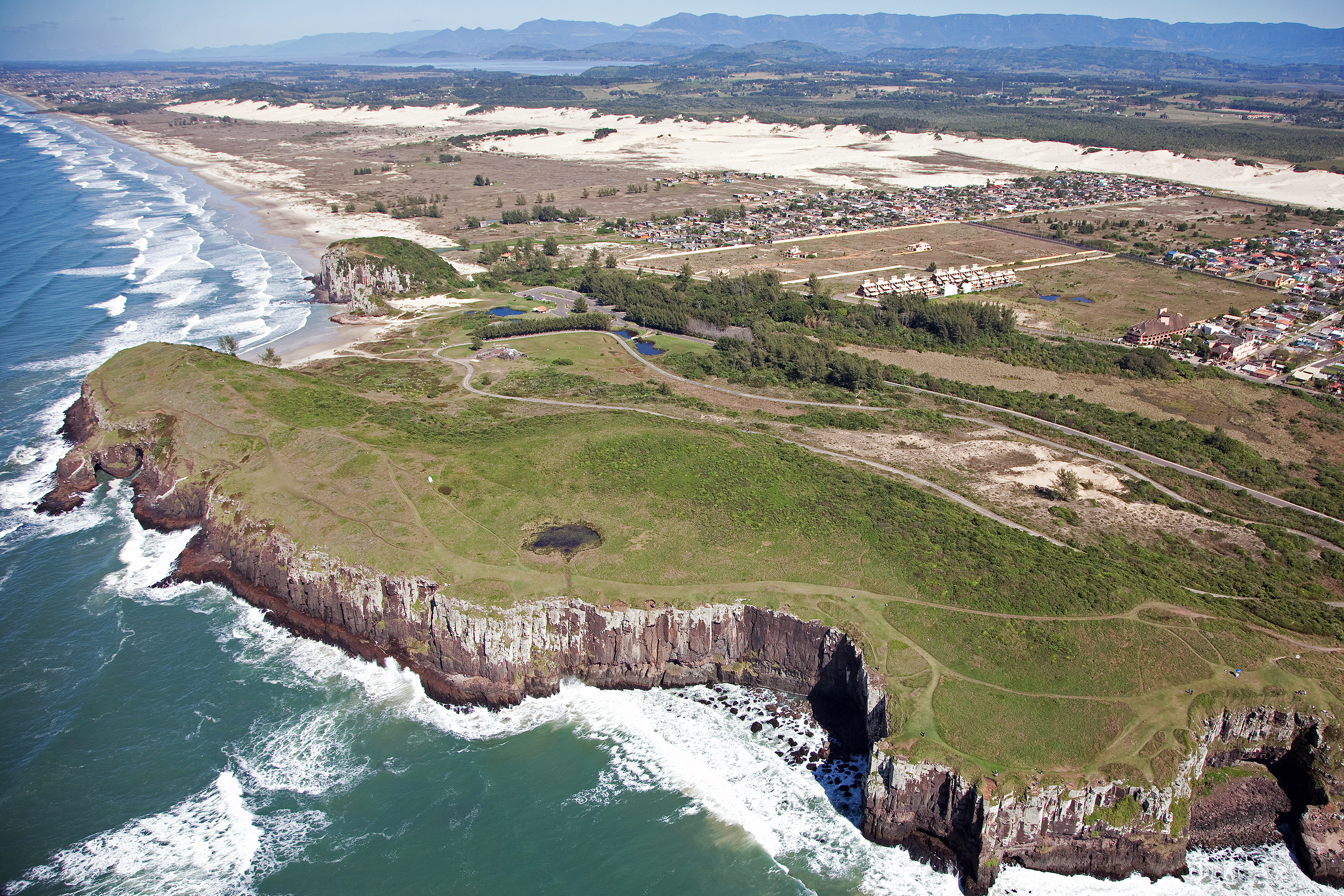
Guarita State Park was one of several articles affected by a covert advertising campaign. The article's previous main image was briefly replaced by one prominently featuring a man in a North Face jacket.

=== Pokémon ===
In the English dub of the Pokémon: The Johto Journeys episode "The Whistle Stop", originally aired December 2, 2000, the character James gets partially swallowed by his Victreebel, and while struggling utters garbled dialogue consisting of the phrase "Leo Burnett and 4Kids are the Devil!" backmasked. Eric Stuart, James' English voice actor at the time, later explained that this was in protest of the companies' decision to stop compensating Pokémon voice actors for the use of their audio clips in promos for the show. This scene was redubbed in later home releases.

=== North Face ===
In 2019, Brazilian-based subsidiary Leo Burnett Tailor Made engaged in product placement on Wikipedia, in which they placed images advertising The North Face products on Wikipedia, and advertised that they had done so in a video posted on YouTube. Once this was discovered, Wikipedia volunteers removed the images, and the Wikimedia Foundation released a statement condemning Leo Burnett Tailor Made's use of Wikipedia for product placement.

The North Face posted a response as a reply on Twitter, stating that they had ended the campaign and that "We believe deeply in Wikipedia’s mission and apologize for engaging in activity inconsistent with those principles."

== See also ==
- History of advertising
