= WMH&I =

Design company in London, England

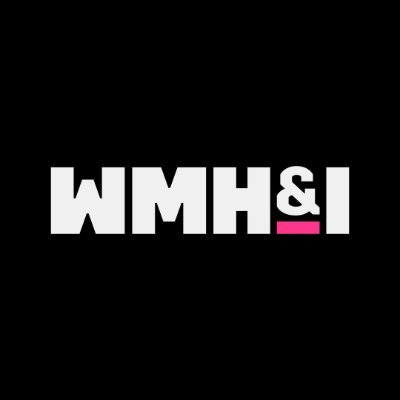
- Type: Subsidiary
- Industry: Advertising, marketing
- Founded: 1997
- Headquarters: London, England
- Key people: Daisy Benn (managing director); Wybe Magermans (director of growth & strategy); Mark Nichols (creative director)
- Services: Brand strategy and design
- Number of employees: 30
- Parent: Writtle Holdings
- Website: wmh-i.com

WMH&I (an acronym of Williams Murray Hamm & Identica), formerly known as Williams Murray Hamm (WMH), is a British brand innovation, design, and strategy agency based in London.

== History ==
Williams Murray Hamm (WMH) was founded in 1997 by Richard Williams and Richard Murray. Garrick Hamm joined the firm a year later. WMH was acquired in 2006 by Loewy Group, a business that was itself acquired by Writtle Holdings in 2011.

Richard Murray died in 2010. Wybe Magermans was appointed to the board in 2016 and became the agency's Managing Director in 2019.

In 2021, WMH merged with Identica, another design and branding agency, to form WMH&I. Following the retirement of Richard Williams in 2016 and Garrick Hamm in 2021, Daisy Benn was appointed to the board, and promoted to Managing Director in 2023 with Mark Nichols joining the Benn and Magermans on the board as Creative Director in 2023.

In June 2024, WMH&I become a B-Corp Certified company.

== Work and accolades ==
WMH's work in Fast-moving Consumer Goods (FMCG) packaging for GSK's Horlicks, Hovis, McVitie's Jaffa Cakes and Sainsbury's SO organics and Sainsbury's Basics led to the business being named Design Agency of the Year by Marketing Magazine in 2002 and 2004.

WMH has won DBA Design Effectiveness Awards for its work on Here Organics, Sainsbury's SO organic, Wild Brew (which also won a D&AD yellow pencil), while Hovis and Clipper Teas won the DBA Design Effectiveness Grand Prix in 2002 and 2004 respectively.

Other work includes 2003's redesign of the Barclays Bank identity, 2004's relaunch for Fortnum & Mason, via a brand book and repackaging exercise. The company has maintained an eight-year relationship with Syngenta, the Swiss agrochemicals business. Other WMH clients include Beazley, Way to Blue and Jamie Oliver's store Recipease venture, Burger delivery start-up Chosen Bun, Magic Me, JuiceBurst (Purity Soft Drinks), Syngenta, charity Ella's Home,.

More recent work includes the launch of Waitrose & Partners Free From range of foods, creation of completely new container shipping company, Ocean Network Express (ONE), and USA-based food producer Lamb Weston.

In 2015, the agency was awarded the top prize at The Drum's inaugural Dream Awards and gold at the Fresh Awards for its packaging design for UK erotica brand Coco de Mer. Additionally, WMH won gold in the body category at the celebrated Pentawards for its work with beauty brand Prismologie.

2016 saw WMH's return to win gold at the Design Effectiveness Awards (Design Business Association) for their interactive brand design work with JuiceBurst (Purity Soft Drinks). The award-winning continued for its brand identity and packaging work for Coco de Mer winning the coveted D&AD Yellow Pencil Award, the Drum Design Award, Design Week Award (Package Design Category) and Creative Review Annual where it was awarded 'Best in Book: Design'.

Led by Benn, Magermans and Nichols, the agency’s approach is centred on the 'power of creativity' in shaping brand identity and communication. This has led to well received work for the likes of GameStop with the creation of Candy Con, Vetoquinol and its Drontal brand, London professional dominatrix Jane Grey, Redbreast whiskey rebrand for Pernod Ricard, and pro bono work to raise awareness of Ehler-Danlos Syndroms.

In 2025, the agency also was recognised for the changes it made to internal culture and won Best Agency to Work For at Creativepool.
