= Macbeth (2015 film) =

Film directed by Justin Kurzel

- Theatrical release poster
- Directed by: Justin Kurzel
- Screenplay by: Todd Louiso; Jacob Koskoff; Michael Lesslie
- Based on: Macbeth by William Shakespeare
- Produced by: Iain Canning; Emile Sherman; Laura Hastings-Smith
- Starring: Michael Fassbender; Marion Cotillard; Paddy Considine; Sean Harris; Jack Reynor; Elizabeth Debicki; David Thewlis
- Cinematography: Adam Arkapaw
- Edited by: Chris Dickens
- Music by: Jed Kurzel
- Production companies: StudioCanal; Film4 Productions; DMC Film; Anton Capital Entertainment; Creative Scotland; See-Saw Films
- Distributed by: StudioCanal
- Release dates: 23 May 2015 (Cannes); 2 October 2015 (United Kingdom); 18 November 2015 (France)
- Running time: 113 minutes
- Countries: United Kingdom; France
- Budget: $15–20 million
- Box office: $16.3 million

Macbeth is a 2015 epic historical drama film directed by Justin Kurzel from a screenplay by Todd Louiso, Jacob Koskoff, and Michael Lesslie, based on William Shakespeare's eponymous play. The film is a co-production between the United Kingdom and France and stars Michael Fassbender in the title role and Marion Cotillard as Lady Macbeth, with Paddy Considine, Sean Harris, David Hayman, Jack Reynor, Elizabeth Debicki and David Thewlis in supporting roles. The story follows the Scottish lord's rise to power after receiving a prophecy from a trio of witches that one day he will become king of Scotland. Like the play it was adapted from, the film dramatises the damaging physical and psychological effects of political ambition on those who seek power for its own sake.

Macbeth premiered on 23 May 2015 at the Cannes Film Festival where it competed for the Palme d'Or. The film was released theatrically by StudioCanal on 2 October 2015 in the United Kingdom and on 18 November 2015 in France. It received generally positive reviews from film critics who praised both Fassbender and Cotillard's performances, as well as those of the rest of the cast, visual style, script, direction and war sequences. Despite the positive critical reaction, the film had a limited theatrical release and grossed $16 million worldwide against its production budget of $20 million.

== Plot ==
=== Act I ===
The film starts with the Macbeths grieving at their child's funeral. Then, Macbeth leads King Duncan's troops into a civil war battle. He emerges victorious, despite losses, including boy soldiers. Three women with a girl and infant approach Macbeth and Banquo, hailing Macbeth as Thane of Cawdor and future king, and Banquo as a father of kings, before disappearing.

=== Act II ===
Duncan hears of Macbeth's victory and executes the Thane of Cawdor for traitorously allying with Norse invaders, giving Macbeth his title. Macbeth tells his wife of the prophecies. Lady Macbeth prays to the dark spirits for guidance. When Macbeth says Duncan will stay overnight, she urges him to kill the King to fulfill the prophecy. A feast is held, where the King pronounces Malcolm his heir. Macbeth hesitates but Lady Macbeth persuades him to kill Duncan while she drugs his servants. After the feast, Macbeth sees a boy soldier's ghost, who gives him a dagger and leads him towards the tent of Duncan whom Macbeth slays. Malcolm enters and, seeing the body, flees. Shaken, Macbeth goes to his wife, giving her two daggers. Lady Macbeth rebukes him for not leaving them and puts them in the sleeping servants' hands. She meets Macbeth in the church where they wash their hands, saying they have washed their deed away.

=== Act III ===
In the morning, Macduff finds Duncan dead and Macbeth slaughters the servants to prevent their denial. Macduff and Noble Lennox believe Malcolm's flight is suspicious and admire Macbeth's summary justice. With Malcolm gone, Macbeth is crowned. Afterward, he sourly complains to his wife that killing Duncan was for nothing as Macbeth has no heirs, so the crown will pass to Banquo and his son, Fleance, as prophesied. He invites them to a banquet but discovers they plan to leave, as Banquo is suspicious. Macbeth sends assassins: Banquo is killed, but Fleance escapes. During the evening, Macbeth mentions Banquo not attending as promised. Macbeth asks the assassins for news and is enraged that Fleance has escaped. Then, Macbeth sees Banquo's ghost. Afraid, he talks to it. Lady Macbeth says her husband is unwell, but Macbeth continues to rave, prompting Macduff and his wife to leave. Lady Macbeth dismisses the guests and takes Macbeth away.

=== Act IV ===
Macbeth talks to the witches. They show him a vision of slain soldiers who tell him to beware Macduff, and that Macbeth shall be King until Great Birnam Wood comes to the royal castle at Dunsinane Hill. The boy soldier's ghost who gave him the dagger tells Macbeth that he will not be slain by man born of a woman. The King is found wandering by Lennox who tells him that Macduff has fled. Anxious and enraged, Macbeth orders the death of Macduff's family and servants. The family are burned at the stake, while a distraught Lady Macbeth watches. Afterwards, she washes the daggers. Meanwhile, Macduff meets Malcolm, who is gathering troops. Ross and Angus inform Macduff about his household's murder. Grief-stricken and angry, Macduff swears revenge.

=== Act V ===
Guilt-ridden, Lady Macbeth returns to the church, lamenting their deeds and her bloody hands. She sees her child's ghost, which she urges to sleep. Then she wanders in the hills and sees the witches.

In the castle, Macbeth is rumoured mad, and all fear his anger and tyranny. He is told of his wife's death. Speaking the famous soliloquy, starting "tomorrow and tomorrow and tomorrow" (also known by the lines in it beginning "Out, out, brief candle!"), he carries her body in despair. Seyton brings news that Malcolm is leading an army and Macbeth demands his armour.

Macduff fires Birnam Wood: with smoke blowing towards them, the prophecy is fulfilled. Macbeth sallies out and duels with Macduff. Macbeth is confident, as "no man born of woman" can kill him, and he defeats Macduff, a dagger at his throat. Macduff states he was untimely ripped from his mother's womb and Macbeth drops his dagger, saying he won't fight (the prophecy). Macbeth regrets his mistakes, knowing redemption is impossible. Macbeth refuses to bow before Malcolm and goads Macduff into killing him. The witches, observing, leave. Malcolm is hailed King and all go to his castle. Malcolm leaves the throne room while Fleance takes Macbeth's sword and charges through the empty battlefield, disappearing into the smoke.

== Cast ==
- Michael Fassbender as Macbeth
- Marion Cotillard as Lady Macbeth
- Paddy Considine as Banquo
- Sean Harris as Macduff
- Jack Reynor as Malcolm
- Elizabeth Debicki as Lady Macduff
- David Thewlis as King Duncan
- David Hayman as Lennox
- Maurice Roëves as Menteith
- Brian Nickels as Thane of Cawdor
- Ross Anderson as Ross
- James Harkness as Angus
- Seylan Mhairi Baxter, Lynn Kennedy, Kayla Fallon and Amber Rissmann as the Witches
- Lochlann Harris as Fleance
- Hilton McRae as Macdonwald
- Scott Dymond as Seyton
- Rebecca Benson as Maidservant
- Gerard Miller as Macbeth's messenger
- Roy Sampson as Doctor

== Production ==
=== Development ===
Circa 2001, producer Iain Canning was working as a sort of copy-making tea maker at Renaissance Films, a London-based company that produced Kenneth Branagh's William Shakespeare films, when he read the script that was the basis for Macbeth while he was photocopying it for the executives in the company, and Canning thought if he ever became a producer, he would love to be a part of that film. After leaving the company, Canning became a producer and produced films such as Steve McQueen's Hunger (2008) and Shame (2011), both starring Michael Fassbender, who later asked Canning to help him fund his film Slow West (2015). Canning then approached Fassbender with Macbeth. Fassbender took the project to Australian director Justin Kurzel after seeing his film Snowtown (2011). Kurzel had spent 18 months working on another film that did not get made when Canning offered him Macbeth. Kurzel accepted the project because he was a big fan of Fassbender and wanted to work with him. Kurzel and Fassbender had been trying to work together on another project that did not work out prior to Macbeth.

On 29 April 2013, it was reported that Fassbender would star in the title role of a film adaptation of William Shakespeare's play Macbeth, with Justin Kurzel attached to direct from a screenplay written by Todd Louiso and Jacob Koskoff, with See-Saw Films and Film4 attached to produce the film, whose shooting was expected to begin later that year. It was also reported that at least one Hollywood leading actress was in talks to play the role of Lady Macbeth.

On 1 May 2013, it was reported that Natalie Portman had been cast as Lady Macbeth. Portman had wanted to play Lady Macbeth for a long time and even considered performing in a stage production of the play; she was also looking forward to collaborating with Fassbender again following their work on the then-recently wrapped film Song to Song (2017). Portman later dropped out due to scheduling conflicts—she began filming her directorial debut, A Tale of Love and Darkness (2015), at the same time as shooting for Macbeth began—and was replaced by Marion Cotillard in August 2013. Cotillard was chosen by both Kurzel and Fassbender. Filming for Macbeth was scheduled to begin in January 2014. Michael Lesslie later joined as screenwriter. Adam Arkapaw served as director of photography. The score was composed by Jed Kurzel.

Kurzel and Fassbender decided to re-interpret Macbeth as a man suffering from post-traumatic stress disorder, as opposed to a power-hungry King. Kurzel thought it would be interesting to see how Macbeth's ambition and power could arise from trauma and grief, such as through the loss of a child or due to post-traumatic stress after all the battles he had been through. Kurzel avoided watching previous adaptations of Macbeth before directing this film, while Fassbender chose to watch the films to prepare himself to play the role.

Kurzel included a prologue in which the Macbeths bury their dead child, which does not exist in the play. Kurzel said that his father's death was an underlying influence in both Macbeth and Snowtown. He told The Guardian: "I've had a difficult time decoding my grief, working out what do with it. That's what I saw in Macbeth. They use ambition to replace grief. And that's what I did with Snowtown."

Cotillard suffered panic attacks for the first time during her preparation to play Lady Macbeth. She said it was due to being hard to live with such a dark character and finding the right accent. She recognized the symptoms because she had studied it during her research for the film Two Days, One Night (2014), in which she played a factory worker struggling with depression.

Cotillard recalled that her interest in portraying Lady Macbeth originated when she was in acting school watching another student playing the character. The experience prompted her to envision herself playing the role, drawn to the character's dark, turbulent yet deeply human nature. Although Cotillard had previously studied the play in French, preparing for the film required her to overcome the challenges of learning Shakespearean English, including its distinctive expressions and double meanings. She nevertheless welcomed the opportunity, expressing happiness at discovering the play in its original language. Cotillard said it was hard to get rid of the images of actresses such as Judi Dench playing Lady Macbeth, but then she stopped comparing herself to the other actresses who played the character before her job was done. Rather than seeking to emulate or distinguish her portrayal from those of previous actresses, Cotillard allowed Kurzel's vision to guide her interpretation of Lady Macbeth. This involved deconstructing the character's image as monster and not just show the Macbeths as monsters who do horrible things, as there's a reason why they became monsters and descended into madness. Cotillard also found that the harsh weather conditions during filming in Scotland, particularly the hail, fog and strong winds, helped her connect with the atmosphere of the story and incorporate its sense of adversity into her performance. Cotillard considered playing Lady Macbeth on stage at one point, but after her intense experience in this film she gave up on that idea, saying she was done with playing the character.

Shakespeare expert Neil Swain was the cast's dialect coach. The director and the cast rehearsed for a month and a half before shooting in a theatrical rehearsal process where they explored different choices they could make for the scenes. Fassbender read the script more than 200 times before the first read-through with the director and the cast. Fassbender said he is "a little dyslexic" with the iambic pentameter and focused on understanding the intent behind the words when learning the dialogue for Macbeth.

The film's production budget was estimated between $15–20 million. France's StudioCanal financed most of the production along with United Kingdom's Film4, and bought distribution rights for the film in the UK, France and Germany and also handled international sales.

After working together on Macbeth, Kurzel, Fassbender and Cotillard collaborated together again a year later in Assassin's Creed (2016).

=== Filming ===
Principal photography took place over seven weeks in England and Scotland, beginning on 6 February 2014 in Scotland. On 21 February, filming took place at Hankley Common in Elstead, Surrey. On 26 February, the cast and crew were spotted on set at Bamburgh Castle in Northumberland with almost 200 extras. Other locations used include Quiraing in Skye, and Ely Cathedral in Ely, Cambridgeshire.

During filming, the cast and crew began referring to Macbeth as "The Scottish Film" after a series of strange incidents happened on set. Kurzel said he tried to dismiss the superstition, however, a number of things happened on set that made him question the history of the play. Kurzel later acknowledged that he hoped the name change would improve their luck, referring to the infamous "Macbeth curse", a theatrical superstition that holds that uttering the name Macbeth inside a theatre brings bad luck, leading actors to refer to it as "The Scottish Play" to avoid the supposed curse. Fassbender kept the tradition even after filming had wrapped, referring to it as "The Scottish Film" in interviews during the film's promo tour. Fassbender said the worst luck they had was the weather, which was terrible. Kurzel said that there was "a supernatural element to filming in Skye in January, it seemed to be a place where spirits walk".

While filming on the Isle of Skye, Cotillard fell into a bog and submerged up to her neck. Kurzel said Cotillard disappeared, and for a moment he thought they had lost her. It took two crew members to pull Cotillard out as her feet sank into the mud. Kurzel said that filming Macbeth felt like playing with a Ouija board. "After 18 takes of Marion doing "Come you spirits..." the atmosphere gets pretty weird. Once you start invoking certain things, it is like you're getting close to...evil, really." However, Cotillard said she is not superstitious and was fine with saying the "M" word, and that nothing happened during filming that validated the "curse".

Some members of the cast suffered from hypothermia while filming on Skye under heavy rain, sleet and snow. While filming on Skye in February 2014, the temperature was 10 degrees below freezing by midmorning, and the hail was so strong that Kurzel had to fasten industrial fans to the fronts of the cameras to blow it out of shot. After Kurzel called "action", him and the crew were watching the scenes on a monitor under a flapping tarpaulin, while Fassbender had to stand there with no protection with his face turned towards the storm.

Fassbender told during a Q&A with the National Board of Review in December 2015 that when they were filming the scorpion scene, he put his hand underneath Cotillard's dress without telling her that he was going to do that, and then she went with it and pulled him away. "She's got this sort of repulsion, and then she reengages, and she's like, "I love this man, I feel him, he's sick." All these things are happening on her face. That's when you realize you're in the presence of somebody great. I knew when she came on board I was just so happy, I knew she would nail it. And she brings this sort of royal quality. I love the idea that he's more rough, sort of from the gutter-type character, and she's regal, she's got royal blood. It's the dichotomy between them. It's pretty cool", Fassbender said. Cotillard confirmed the story during a Q&A with the SAG-AFTRA Foundation in January 2016, saying she was surprised by Fassbender putting his hand underneath her dress.

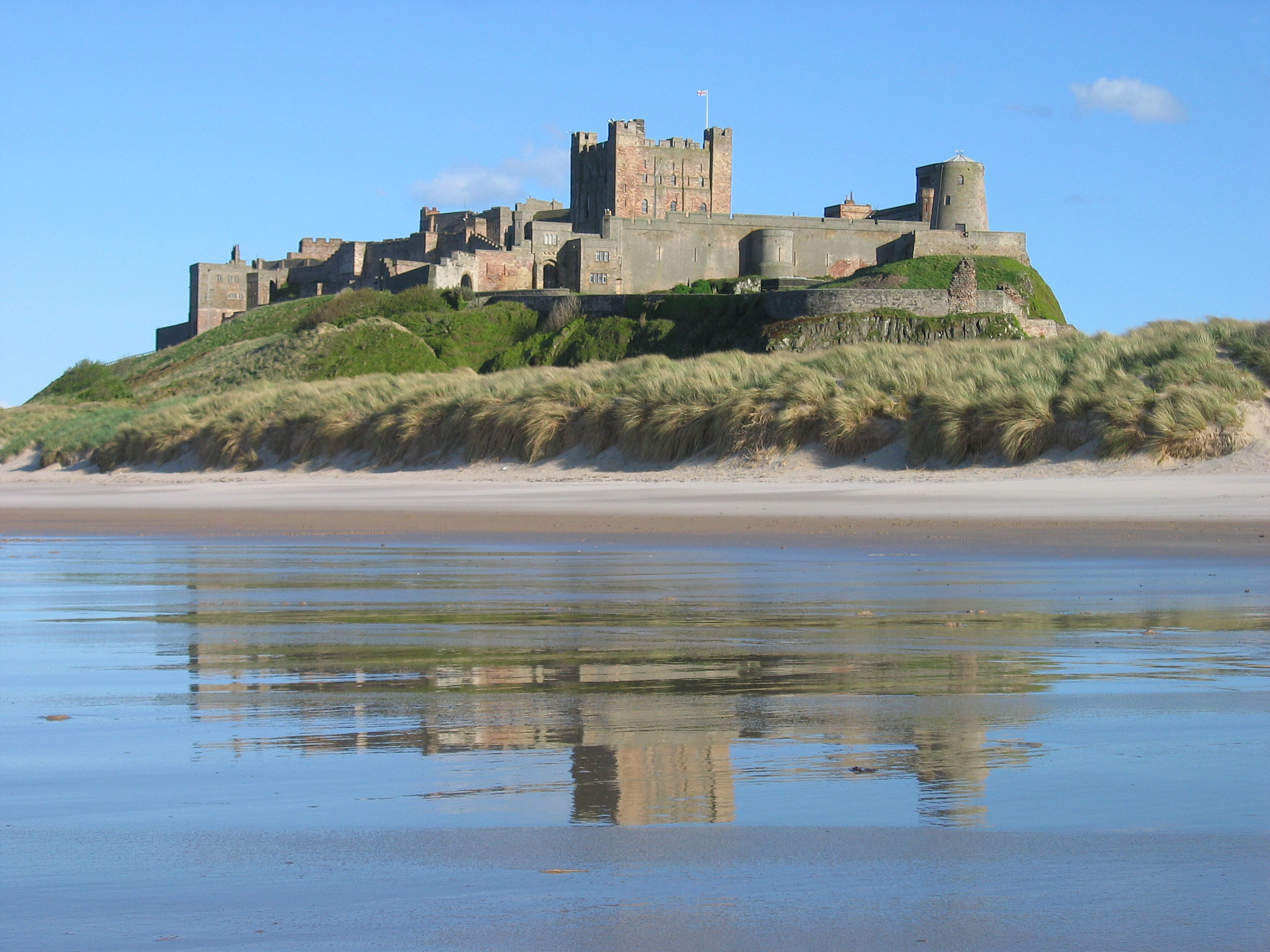
Bamburgh Castle.

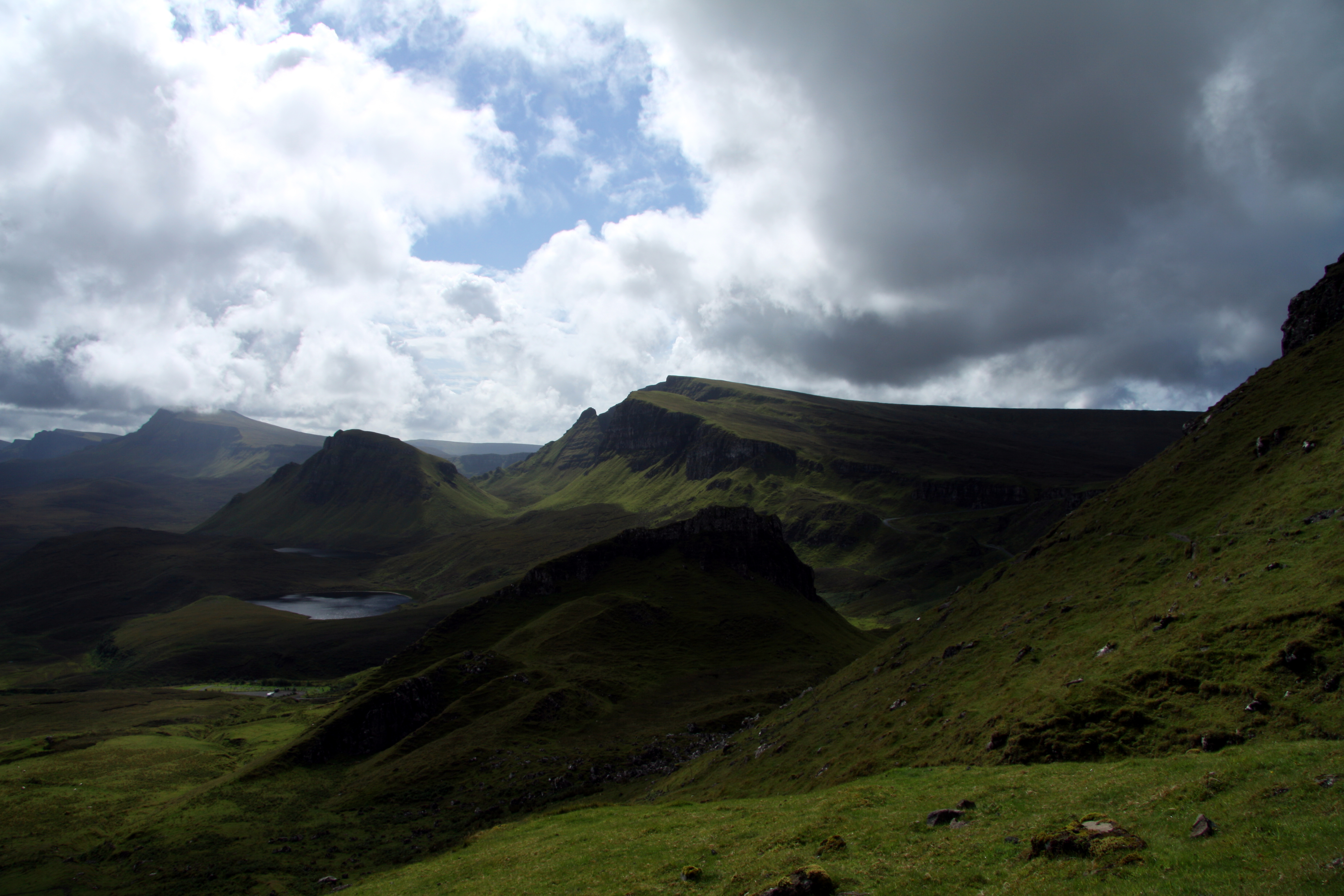
Quiraing.

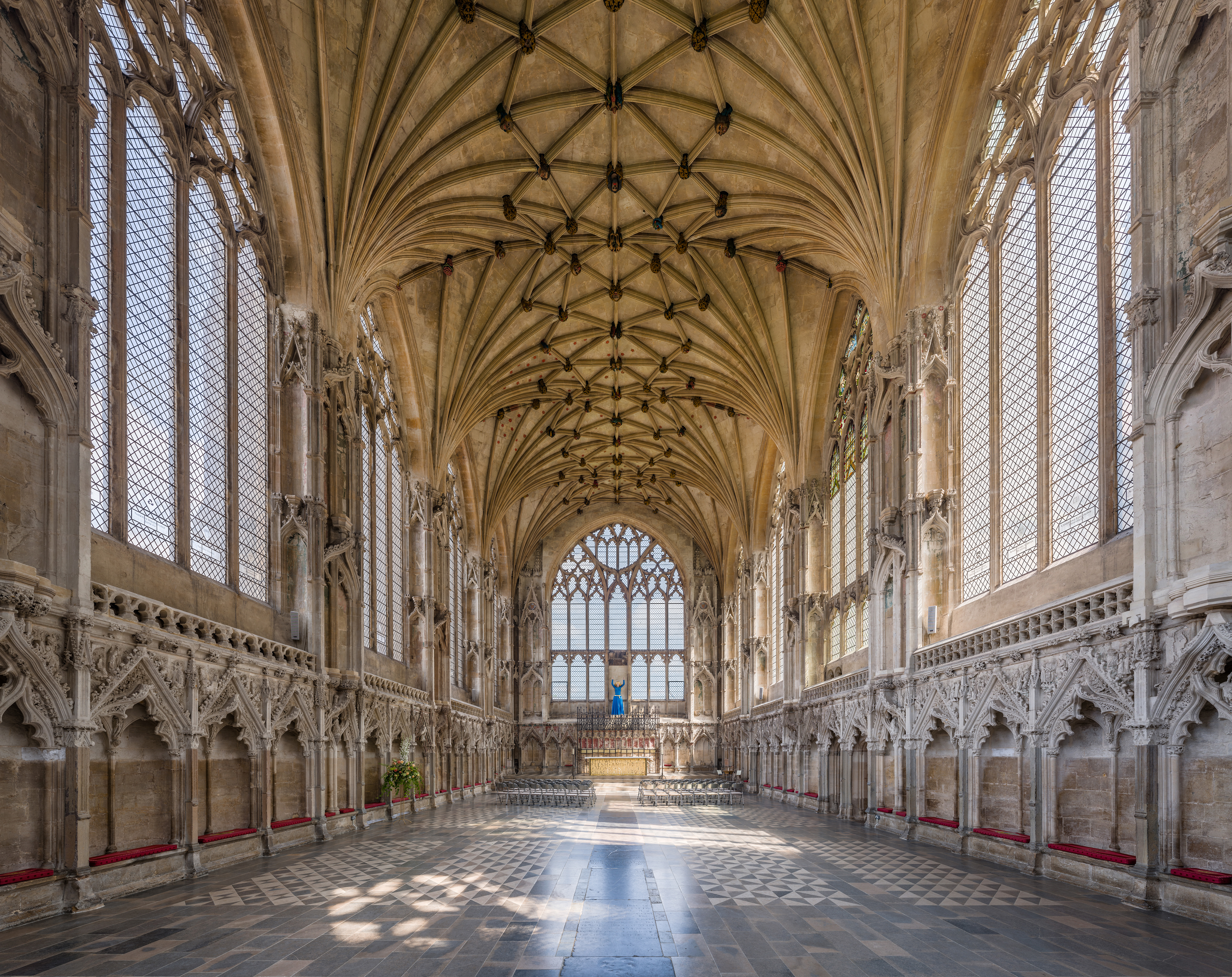
Interior of Ely Cathedral.

=== Costumes ===
Costume designer Jacqueline Durran was in charge of the costumes for the film. Durran took reference from a book called the Tilke, which is a sort of encyclopaedia of folk costume, compiled and illustrated in the 1920s by a German artist and ethnographer, Max Tilke.

== Release ==
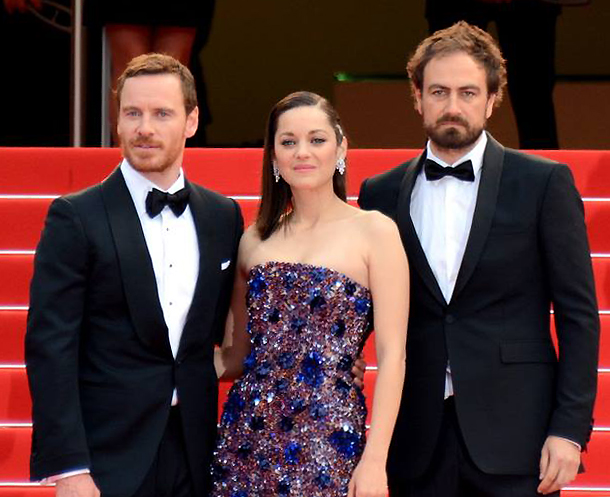
Director and stars promoting the film at the 2015 Cannes Film Festival.

In October 2013, The Weinstein Company acquired North American distribution rights to the film after a bidding war with Fox Searchlight. StudioCanal handled the distribution in the United Kingdom and France.

=== Theatrical ===
Macbeth premiered at the 2015 Cannes Film Festival on 23 May 2015, where it competed for the Palme d'Or, and was released in the United Kingdom on 2 October 2015, and in France in 98 theaters on 18 November. The film had a limited release in the United States across five theatres in New York, Los Angeles and San Francisco on 4 December 2015, before expanding to a total of 108 theaters on 11 December. The film was released in the Philippines by Pioneer Films on 13 January 2016. Macbeth grossed a total of $16.3 million worldwide.

=== Home media ===
The film was released on Blu-Ray in the U.K. by StudioCanal on 1 February 2016. It was released on DVD and Blu-Ray in the U.S. by Anchor Bay Entertainment on 8 March 2016. Extras include a Q&A with Michael Fassbender and "Making Macbeth" featurette.

== Reception ==
=== Critical response ===
Macbeth has received positive reviews from critics. On the review aggregator Rotten Tomatoes, the film has an approval rating of 79% based on 193 reviews, with an average rating of 7.3/10. The site's critical consensus reads, "Faithful to the source material without sacrificing its own cinematic flair, Justin Kurzel's Macbeth rises on the strength of a mesmerizing Michael Fassbender performance to join the upper echelon of big-screen Shakespeare adaptations." Metacritic gives the film a weighted average score of 71 out of 100, based on 35 critics, indicating "generally favorable reviews".

Writing for The New York Times on 3 December 2015, Manohla Dargis complimented Fassbender's performance in the lead role, stating:

Kenneth Tynan once wrote that 'nobody has ever succeeded as Macbeth' because the character shrinks from a complex figure into a cowering thug. The exception, Tynan continued, immediately contradicting his claim, was Laurence Olivier, who in a 1955 production 'shook hands with greatness.' With his Macbeth, Mr. Fassbender, who routinely shakes hands with greatness in films that don't remotely do the same, produces a man whose anguish eventually becomes a powerful counterpoint to his deeds, partly because he's already dead by the time he utters his first word. Mr. Fassbender gives you a reason to see this Macbeth, although the writing isn't bad, either.

Cotillard's performance also earned high praise from critics, particularly for her rendition of the famous "Out damned spot" monologue. Guy Lodge from Variety stated that "Cotillard electrically conveys misdirected sexual magnetism, but also a poignantly defeated sense of decency," and noted that it was a performance that "contains both the woman's abandoned self and her worst-case incarnation, often in the space of a single scene," and remarked that "Her deathless sleepwalking scene, staged in minimalist fashion under a gauze of snowflakes in a bare chapel, is played with tender, desolate exhaustion; it deserves to be viewed as near-definitive."

Luke Buckmaster of The Daily Review rated the film four out of five stars, calling it "bold" and "fearless" and praising the production values as well as Fassbender and Cotillard's performances, but criticised the actors' poor enunciation or peculiar accents, which distracted from the film's other qualities.

=== Accolades ===
Year	Award / Festival	Category	Recipient(s)	Result	Ref.
2015	Cannes Film Festival	Palme d'Or	Justin Kurzel	Nominated	
2015	British Independent Film Awards	Best British Independent Film	Macbeth	Nominated	
2015	British Independent Film Awards	Best Director	Justin Kurzel	Nominated	
2015	British Independent Film Awards	Best Actor	Michael Fassbender	Nominated	
2015	British Independent Film Awards	Best Actress	Marion Cotillard	Nominated	
2015	British Independent Film Awards	Best Supporting Actor	Sean Harris	Nominated	
2015	British Independent Film Awards	Best Technical Achievement	Adam Arkapaw	Nominated	
2016	Empire Awards	Best British Film	Macbeth	Nominated	
2016	Empire Awards	Best Actor	Michael Fassbender	Nominated	
2016	Goya Awards	Best European Film	Justin Kurzel	Nominated	
2016	Satellite Awards	Best Art Direction and Production Design	Fiona Crombie	Nominated	
2016	Satellite Awards	Best Costume Design	Jacqueline Durran	Nominated	
