= Best Supporting Actor =

Best Supporting Actor may refer to any one of many different awards, including:

- AACTA International Award for Best Supporting Actor
- AVN Award for Best Supporting Actor
- Academy Award for Best Supporting Actor
- Bengal Film Journalists' Association – Best Supporting Actor Award
- Black Reel Award: Best Supporting Actor
- Bollywood Movie Award – Best Supporting Actor
- Boston Society of Film Critics Award for Best Supporting Actor
- British Academy Television Award for Best Supporting Actor
- Broadcast Film Critics Association Award for Best Supporting Actor
- Chicago Film Critics Association Award for Best Supporting Actor
- César Award for Best Supporting Actor
- Dallas-Fort Worth Film Critics Association Award for Best Supporting Actor
- David di Donatello for Best Supporting Actor
- Empire Award for Best Supporting Actor
- Filmfare Award for Best Supporting Actor
  - Filmfare Award for Best Supporting Actor – Kannada
  - Filmfare Award for Best Supporting Actor – Malayalam
  - Filmfare Award for Best Supporting Actor – Marathi
  - Filmfare Award for Best Supporting Actor – Tamil
  - Filmfare Award for Best Supporting Actor – Telugu
- Florida Film Critics Circle Award for Best Supporting Actor
- GIFA Best Supporting Actor Award (Global Indian Film Awards)
- Golden Calf Award for Best Supporting Actor
- Golden Globe Award for Best Supporting Actor – Motion Picture
- Golden Globe Award for Best Supporting Actor – Series, Miniseries or Television Film
- Goya Award for Best Supporting Actor
- Hong Kong Film Award for Best Supporting Actor
- Hundred Flowers Award for Best Supporting Actor
- Independent Spirit Award for Best Supporting Male
- IIFA Award for Best Supporting Actor (International Indian Film Academy)
- ITFA Best Supporting Actor Award (International Tamil Film Awards)
- Karnataka State Film Award for Best Supporting Actor
- Kerala Film Critics Association Award for Best Supporting Actor
- Los Angeles Film Critics Association Award for Best Supporting Actor
- Maharashtra State Film Award for Best Supporting Actor
- MFK Award for Favourite Supporting Actor (Maharashtracha Favourite Kon?)
- Nandi Award for Best Supporting Actor
- National Board of Review Award for Best Supporting Actor
- National Film Award for Best Supporting Actor
- National Society of Film Critics Award for Best Supporting Actor
- New York Film Critics Circle Award for Best Supporting Actor
- Norway Tamil Film Festival Award for Best Supporting Actor
- Odisha State Film Award for Best Supporting Actor
- Online Film Critics Society Award for Best Supporting Actor
- Polish Academy Award for Best Supporting Actor
- San Diego Film Critics Society Award for Best Supporting Actor
- Satellite Award for Best Supporting Actor – Motion Picture
- Satellite Award for Best Supporting Actor – Series, Miniseries or Television Film
- Satellite Award for Best Supporting Actor – Television Series
- Saturn Award for Best Supporting Actor on Television
- Saturn Award for Best Supporting Actor
- Screen Award for Best Supporting Actor
- St. Louis Gateway Film Critics Association Award for Best Supporting Actor
- Stardust Award for Best Supporting Actor
- Tamil Nadu State Film Award for Best Supporting Actor
- TVB Anniversary Award for Best Supporting Actor
- Toronto Film Critics Association Award for Best Supporting Actor
- Vancouver Film Critics Circle Award for Best Supporting Actor
- Vijay Award for Best Supporting Actor
- Washington D.C. Area Film Critics Association Award for Best Supporting Actor
- Zee Chitra Gaurav Puraskar for Best Supporting Actor

== See also ==
- Best Supporting Actress (disambiguation)
- Best Actor in a Supporting Role (disambiguation)
- Supporting actor
- List of awards for supporting actor
