= List of accolades received by 12 Years a Slave (film) =

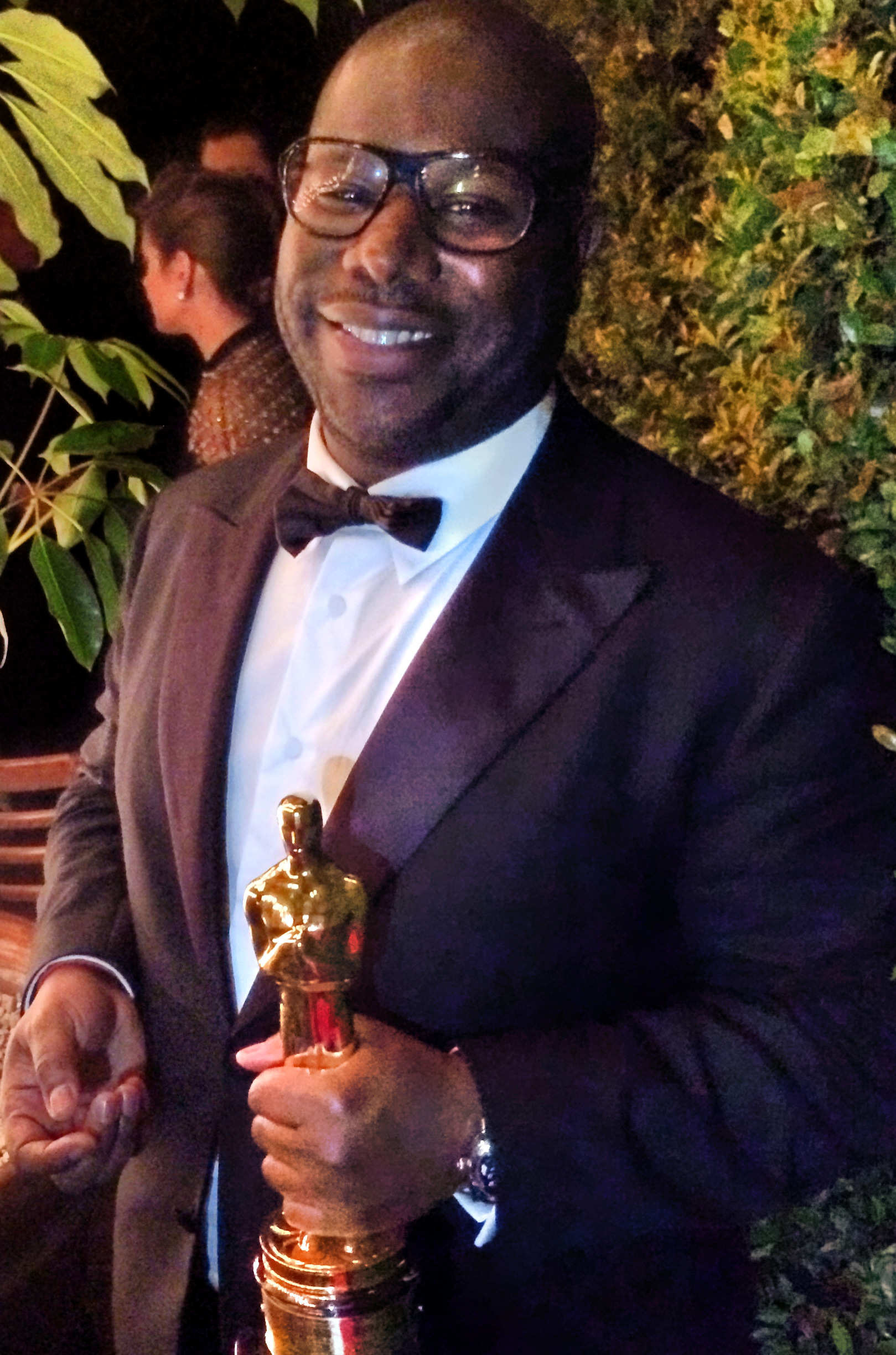
- Director and producer Steve McQueen holding the Academy Award for Best Picture trophy for the film at the 86th Academy Awards on March 2, 2014
Accolades
Award	Won	Nominated
AARP Annual Movies for Grownups Awards	1	1
Academy Awards	3	9
African-American Film Critics Association	4	4
Alliance of Women Film Journalists	6	13
American Black Film Festival	4	7
American Cinema Editors	0	1
American Film Institute	1	1
American Society of Cinematographers	0	1
Art Directors Guild	0	1
Austin Film Critics Association	4	4
Australian Academy of Cinema and Television Arts Awards	2	6
Black Reel Awards	8	9
Boston Society of Film Critics	3	4
Britannia Awards	1	1
British Academy Film Awards	2	11
Broadcast Film Critics Association	3	13
Camerimage	0	1
Casting Society of America	1	1
César Award	0	1
Chicago Film Critics Association	5	11
Costume Designers Guild	1	1
Dallas–Fort Worth Film Critics Association	7	7
David di Donatello	0	1
Detroit Film Critics Society	0	4
Directors Guild of America Award	0	1
Dublin Film Festival	3	3
Empire Awards	1	6
Florida Film Critics Circle	4	5
Gay and Lesbian Entertainment Critics Association	1	5
Golden Globe Awards	1	7
Golden Tomato Awards	1	2
Gotham Awards	0	4
Guardian Film Awards	1	8
Guldbagge Awards	0	1
Hamptons International Film Festival	1	1
Hollywood Film Festival	2	2
Houston Film Critics Society	4	8
Independent Spirit Awards	5	7
Irish Film & Television Academy	2	3
London Film Critics' Circle	3	9
Los Angeles Film Critics Association	2	3
Mill Valley Film Festival	2	2
Motion Picture Sound Editors	0	3
MTV Movie & TV Awards	0	4
NAACP Image Awards	4	6
National Board of Review	1	1
National Society of Film Critics	0	4
New York Film Critics Circle	1	5
New York Film Critics Online	4	4
Online Film Critics Society	5	8
Palm Springs International Film Festival	2	2
Producers Guild of America Awards	1	1
San Diego Film Critics Society	0	10
San Francisco Film Critics Circle	3	9
Satellite Awards	2	10
Saturn Awards	1	1
Screen Actors Guild Awards	1	4
Screen Nation Awards	3	3
St. Louis Film Critics Association	7	10
Stockholm International Film Festival	2	2
Toronto Film Critics Association	0	5
Toronto International Film Festival	1	1
USC Scripter Award	1	1
Vancouver Film Critics Circle	1	6
Village Voice Film Poll	3	4
Washington D.C. Area Film Critics Association	6	11
Women Film Critics Circle	3	3
- Total number of awards and nominations
Totals	145	315
- References

12 Years a Slave is a 2013 historical drama film directed and produced by Steve McQueen. It is an adaptation of the 1853 autobiographical slave narrative memoir of the same name by Solomon Northup, a New York-born free negro who was kidnapped in Washington, D.C. in 1841 and sold into slavery. The film stars Chiwetel Ejiofor as the protagonist, Northup. Michael Fassbender, Benedict Cumberbatch, Paul Dano, Paul Giamatti, Lupita Nyong'o, Sarah Paulson, Brad Pitt (also a producer of the film), and Alfre Woodard feature in supporting roles. The screenplay based on the aforementioned memoir was written by John Ridley.

Following successful screenings at the Telluride Film Festival and New York Film Festival, the film held its public premiere at the 2013 Toronto International Film Festival, where it won the People's Choice Award. Fox Searchlight Pictures initially gave the film a limited release at nineteen theaters on October 18, aimed primarily towards art house and African American patrons. The film was later given a wide release at over 1,100 theaters in the United States and Canada on November 8. 12 Years a Slave has grossed a worldwide total of over $187 million on a production budget of $20 million. As of 2019, it is McQueen's highest-grossing film. Rotten Tomatoes, a review aggregator, surveyed 358 reviews and judged 95% to be positive.

12 Years a Slave garnered awards and nominations in a variety of categories with particular praise for its direction, screenplay and the acting of its cast. At the 86th Academy Awards, the film received nine nominations including Best Picture and Best Director for McQueen; it went on to win three awards: Best Picture, Best Adapted Screenplay for Ridley, and Best Supporting Actress for Nyong'o. McQueen was the first black director to direct a Best Picture winning film as well as the first black producer to win Best Picture. The film earned seven nominations at the 71st Golden Globe Awards, winning for Best Motion Picture – Drama. At the 67th British Academy Film Awards, the film garnered ten nominations and went on to win two awards: Best Film and Best Actor for Ejiofor.

At the Producers Guild of America Awards, 12 Years a Slave, tied with Gravity for Best Theatrical Motion Picture. The film received four nominations at the 20th Screen Actors Guild Awards, with Nyong'o winning the award for Outstanding Performance by a Female Actor in a Supporting Role. McQueen was also nominated at the Directors Guild of America Awards. Both the American Film Institute and National Board of Review included the film in their list of top ten films of 2013.

== Accolades ==
Award	Date of ceremony	Category	Recipient(s)	Result	Ref(s)
AACTA Awards	January 10, 2014	Best International Film	12 Years a Slave	Nominated	
AACTA Awards	January 10, 2014	Best International Direction	Steve McQueen	Nominated	
AACTA Awards	January 10, 2014	Best International Screenplay	John Ridley	Nominated	
AACTA Awards	January 10, 2014	Best International Actor	Chiwetel Ejiofor	Won	
AACTA Awards	January 10, 2014	Best International Supporting Actor	Michael Fassbender	Won	
AACTA Awards	January 10, 2014	Best International Supporting Actress	Lupita Nyong'o	Nominated	
AARP Annual Movies for Grownups Awards	February 10, 2014	Best Movie for Grownups	12 Years a Slave	Won	
Academy Awards	March 2, 2014	Best Picture	Brad Pitt, Dede Gardner, Jeremy Kleiner, Steve McQueen, and Anthony Katagas	Won	
Academy Awards	March 2, 2014	Best Director	Steve McQueen	Nominated	
Academy Awards	March 2, 2014	Best Actor	Chiwetel Ejiofor	Nominated	
Academy Awards	March 2, 2014	Best Supporting Actor	Michael Fassbender	Nominated	
Academy Awards	March 2, 2014	Best Supporting Actress	Lupita Nyong'o	Won	
Academy Awards	March 2, 2014	Best Adapted Screenplay	John Ridley	Won	
Academy Awards	March 2, 2014	Best Costume Design	Patricia Norris	Nominated	
Academy Awards	March 2, 2014	Best Film Editing	Joe Walker	Nominated	
Academy Awards	March 2, 2014	Best Production Design	Production Design: Adam Stockhausen; Set Decoration: Alice Baker	Nominated	
African-American Film Critics Association	December 13, 2013	Best Film of the Year	12 Years a Slave	Won	
African-American Film Critics Association	December 13, 2013	Best Director	Steve McQueen	Won	
African-American Film Critics Association	December 13, 2013	Best Breakout Performance	Lupita Nyong'o	Won	
African-American Film Critics Association	December 13, 2013	Best Screenplay	John Ridley	Won	
Alliance of Women Film Journalists	December 19, 2013	Best Film	12 Years a Slave	Won	
Alliance of Women Film Journalists	December 19, 2013	Best Director (Female or Male)	Steve McQueen	Won	
Alliance of Women Film Journalists	December 19, 2013	Best Actor	Chiwetel Ejiofor	Nominated	
Alliance of Women Film Journalists	December 19, 2013	Best Actor in a Supporting Role	Michael Fassbender	Nominated	
Alliance of Women Film Journalists	December 19, 2013	Best Actress in a Supporting Role	Lupita Nyong'o	Won	
Alliance of Women Film Journalists	December 19, 2013	Best Screenplay, Adapted	John Ridley	Won	
Alliance of Women Film Journalists	December 19, 2013	Best Ensemble Cast	12 Years a Slave	Nominated	
Alliance of Women Film Journalists	December 19, 2013	Best Cinematography	Sean Bobbitt	Nominated	
Alliance of Women Film Journalists	December 19, 2013	Best Editing	Joe Walker	Nominated	
Alliance of Women Film Journalists	December 19, 2013	Best Music or Score	Hans Zimmer	Nominated	
Alliance of Women Film Journalists	December 19, 2013	Best Breakthrough Performance	Lupita Nyong'o	Won	
Alliance of Women Film Journalists	December 19, 2013	Unforgettable Moment Award	Chiwetel Ejiofor ("Solomon Northup hanging")	Won	
Alliance of Women Film Journalists	December 19, 2013	Unforgettable Moment Award	Lupita Nyong'o ("Patsy pleads for soap")	Nominated	
American Black Film Festival	February 19, 2014	Movie of the Year	12 Years a Slave	Nominated	
American Black Film Festival	February 19, 2014	Best Director	Steve McQueen	Won	
American Black Film Festival	February 19, 2014	Best Actor	Chiwetel Ejiofor	Won	
American Black Film Festival	February 19, 2014	Best Supporting Actress	Lupita Nyong'o	Won	
American Black Film Festival	February 19, 2014	Best Screenplay	John Ridley	Won	
American Black Film Festival	February 19, 2014	Breakout Performance	Lupita Nyong'o	Nominated	
American Black Film Festival	February 19, 2014	Studio of the Year	20th Century Fox/Fox Searchlight Pictures (12 Years a Slave, Baggage Claim, and Black Nativity)	Nominated	
American Cinema Editors	February 7, 2014	Best Edited Feature Film – Dramatic	Joe Walker	Nominated	
American Film Institute	December 9, 2013	Top 10 Movies of the Year	12 Years a Slave	Won	
American Society of Cinematographers	February 2, 2014	Outstanding Achievement in Cinematography in Theatrical Releases	Sean Bobbitt	Nominated	
Art Directors Guild	February 8, 2014	Excellence in Production Design – Period Film	Adam Stockhausen	Nominated	
Austin Film Critics Association	December 17, 2013	AFCA 2013 Top Ten Films	12 Years a Slave	2nd Place	
Austin Film Critics Association	December 17, 2013	Best Actor	Chiwetel Ejiofor	Won	
Austin Film Critics Association	December 17, 2013	Best Supporting Actress	Lupita Nyong'o	Won	
Austin Film Critics Association	December 17, 2013	Best Adapted Screenplay	John Ridley	Won	
Black Reel Awards	February 13, 2014	Best Film	12 Years a Slave	Won	
Black Reel Awards	February 13, 2014	Best Director	Steve McQueen	Won	
Black Reel Awards	February 13, 2014	Best Actor	Chiwetel Ejiofor	Won	
Black Reel Awards	February 13, 2014	Best Supporting Actress	Lupita Nyong'o	Won	
Black Reel Awards	February 13, 2014	Best Screenplay, Adapted or Original	John Ridley	Won	
Black Reel Awards	February 13, 2014	Best Ensemble	The cast of 12 Years a Slave	Won	
Black Reel Awards	February 13, 2014	Best Original Score	Hans Zimmer	Won	
Black Reel Awards	February 13, 2014	Best Original or Adapted Song	Alicia Keys for "Queen of the Field (Patsey’s Song)"	Nominated	
Black Reel Awards	February 13, 2014	Outstanding Breakthrough Actress Performance	Lupita Nyong'o	Won	
Boston Society of Film Critics	December 8, 2013	Best Film	12 Years a Slave	Won	
Boston Society of Film Critics	December 8, 2013	Best Director	Steve McQueen	Won	
Boston Society of Film Critics	December 8, 2013	Best Actor	Chiwetel Ejiofor	Won	
Boston Society of Film Critics	December 8, 2013	Best Supporting Actress	Lupita Nyong'o	Runner-up	
Britannia Awards	November 9, 2013	British Artist of the Year	Benedict Cumberbatch (12 Years a Slave, August: Osage County, The Fifth Estate, The Hobbit: The Desolation of Smaug, and Star Trek Into Darkness)	Won	
British Academy Film Awards	February 16, 2014	Best Film	12 Years a Slave	Won	
British Academy Film Awards	February 16, 2014	Best Director	Steve McQueen	Nominated	
British Academy Film Awards	February 16, 2014	Best Actor	Chiwetel Ejiofor	Won	
British Academy Film Awards	February 16, 2014	Best Supporting Actor	Michael Fassbender	Nominated	
British Academy Film Awards	February 16, 2014	Best Supporting Actress	Lupita Nyong'o	Nominated	
British Academy Film Awards	February 16, 2014	Best Adapted Screenplay	John Ridley	Nominated	
British Academy Film Awards	February 16, 2014	Best Cinematography	Sean Bobbitt	Nominated	
British Academy Film Awards	February 16, 2014	Best Original Music	Hans Zimmer	Nominated	
British Academy Film Awards	February 16, 2014	Best Production Design	Adam Stockhausen, and Alice Baker	Nominated	
British Academy Film Awards	February 16, 2014	Best Editing	Joe Walker	Nominated	
British Academy Film Awards	February 16, 2014	Rising Star	Lupita Nyong'o	Nominated	
Broadcast Film Critics Association	January 16, 2014	Best Picture	12 Years a Slave	Won	
Broadcast Film Critics Association	January 16, 2014	Best Director	Steve McQueen	Nominated	
Broadcast Film Critics Association	January 16, 2014	Best Actor	Chiwetel Ejiofor	Nominated	
Broadcast Film Critics Association	January 16, 2014	Best Supporting Actor	Michael Fassbender	Nominated	
Broadcast Film Critics Association	January 16, 2014	Best Supporting Actress	Lupita Nyong'o	Won	
Broadcast Film Critics Association	January 16, 2014	Best Acting Ensemble	12 Years a Slave	Nominated	
Broadcast Film Critics Association	January 16, 2014	Best Adapted Screenplay	John Ridley	Won	
Broadcast Film Critics Association	January 16, 2014	Best Art Direction	Adam Stockhausen, and Alice Baker	Nominated	
Broadcast Film Critics Association	January 16, 2014	Best Cinematography	Sean Bobbitt	Nominated	
Broadcast Film Critics Association	January 16, 2014	Best Costume Design	Patricia Norris	Nominated	
Broadcast Film Critics Association	January 16, 2014	Best Editing	Joe Walker	Nominated	
Broadcast Film Critics Association	January 16, 2014	Best Makeup	Ma Kalaadevi Ananda	Nominated	
Broadcast Film Critics Association	January 16, 2014	Best Score	Hans Zimmer	Nominated	
Camerimage	November 23, 2013	Golden Frog Award	12 Years a Slave	Nominated	
Casting Society of America	January 22, 2015	Big Budget Drama	Francine Maisler, Meagan Lewis, Melissa Kostenbauder	Won	
César Award	February 20, 2015	Best Foreign Film	12 Years a Slave	Nominated	
Chicago Film Critics Association	December 16, 2013	Best Film	12 Years a Slave	Won	
Chicago Film Critics Association	December 16, 2013	Best Director	Steve McQueen	Won	
Chicago Film Critics Association	December 16, 2013	Best Actor	Chiwetel Ejiofor	Won	
Chicago Film Critics Association	December 16, 2013	Best Supporting Actor	Michael Fassbender	Nominated	
Chicago Film Critics Association	December 16, 2013	Best Supporting Actress	Lupita Nyong'o	Won	
Chicago Film Critics Association	December 16, 2013	Best Adapted Screenplay	John Ridley	Won	
Chicago Film Critics Association	December 16, 2013	Best Original Score	Hans Zimmer	Nominated	
Chicago Film Critics Association	December 16, 2013	Best Cinematography	Sean Bobbitt	Nominated	
Chicago Film Critics Association	December 16, 2013	Best Art Direction/Production Design	Adam Stockhausen, and Alice Baker	Nominated	
Chicago Film Critics Association	December 16, 2013	Best Editing	Joe Walker	Nominated	
Chicago Film Critics Association	December 16, 2013	Most Promising Performer	Lupita Nyong'o	Nominated	
Costume Designers Guild	February 22, 2014	Excellence in Period Film	Patricia Norris	Won	
Dallas–Fort Worth Film Critics Association	December 16, 2013	Top 10 Films	12 Years a Slave	1st Place	
Dallas–Fort Worth Film Critics Association	December 16, 2013	Best Director	Steve McQueen	2nd Place	
Dallas–Fort Worth Film Critics Association	December 16, 2013	Best Actor	Chiwetel Ejiofor	2nd Place	
Dallas–Fort Worth Film Critics Association	December 16, 2013	Best Supporting Actor	Michael Fassbender	2nd Place	
Dallas–Fort Worth Film Critics Association	December 16, 2013	Best Supporting Actress	Lupita Nyong'o	1st Place	
Dallas–Fort Worth Film Critics Association	December 16, 2013	Best Screenplay	John Ridley	1st Place	
Dallas–Fort Worth Film Critics Association	December 16, 2013	Best Cinematography	Sean Bobbitt	2nd Place	
David di Donatello	June 10, 2014	Best Foreign Film	12 Years a Slave	Nominated	
Detroit Film Critics Society	December 13, 2013	Best Film	12 Years a Slave	Nominated	
Detroit Film Critics Society	December 13, 2013	Best Actor	Chiwetel Ejiofor	Nominated	
Detroit Film Critics Society	December 13, 2013	Best Supporting Actress	Lupita Nyong'o	Nominated	
Detroit Film Critics Society	December 13, 2013	Best Ensemble Cast	12 Years a Slave	Nominated	
Directors Guild of America Award	January 25, 2014	Outstanding Directing – Feature Film	Steve McQueen	Nominated	
Dublin Film Festival	December 17, 2014	Top 10 Films	12 Years a Slave	5th place	
Dublin Film Festival	December 17, 2014	Best Director	Steve McQueen	7th place	
Dublin Film Festival	December 17, 2014	Best Actor	Chiwetel Ejiofor (tied with Tom Hardy for Locke, Joaquin Phoenix for Her, and Bill Hader for The Skeleton Twins)	10th place	
Empire Awards	March 30, 2014	Best Film	12 Years a Slave	Nominated	
Empire Awards	March 30, 2014	Best Director	Steve McQueen	Nominated	
Empire Awards	March 30, 2014	Best Actor	Chiwetel Ejiofor	Nominated	
Empire Awards	March 30, 2014	Best Supporting Actor	Michael Fassbender	Won	
Empire Awards	March 30, 2014	Best Supporting Actress	Lupita Nyong'o	Nominated	
Empire Awards	March 30, 2014	Best Female Newcomer	Lupita Nyong'o	Nominated	
Florida Film Critics Circle	December 18, 2013	Best Film	12 Years a Slave	Won	
Florida Film Critics Circle	December 18, 2013	Best Director	Steve McQueen	Won	
Florida Film Critics Circle	December 18, 2013	Best Actor	Chiwetel Ejiofor	Won	
Florida Film Critics Circle	December 18, 2013	Best Supporting Actor	Michael Fassbender	Runner-up	
Florida Film Critics Circle	December 18, 2013	Best Supporting Actress	Lupita Nyong'o	Won	
Florida Film Critics Circle	December 18, 2013	Best Adapted Screenplay	John Ridley	Won	
Florida Film Critics Circle	December 18, 2013	Pauline Kael Breakout Award	Lupita Nyong'o	Won	
Gay and Lesbian Entertainment Critics Association	January 21, 2014	Film of the Year	12 Years a Slave	Won	
Gay and Lesbian Entertainment Critics Association	January 21, 2014	Film Performance of the Year – Actor	Chiwetel Ejiofor	Nominated	
Gay and Lesbian Entertainment Critics Association	January 21, 2014	Film Performance of the Year – Actress	Lupita Nyong'o	Nominated	
Gay and Lesbian Entertainment Critics Association	January 21, 2014	Rising Star Award	Lupita Nyong'o	Nominated	
Gay and Lesbian Entertainment Critics Association	January 21, 2014	Wilde Artist of the Year	Steve McQueen	Nominated	
Golden Globe Awards	January 12, 2014	Best Motion Picture – Drama	12 Years a Slave	Won	
Golden Globe Awards	January 12, 2014	Best Director – Motion Picture	Steve McQueen	Nominated	
Golden Globe Awards	January 12, 2014	Best Performance by an Actor in a Motion Picture – Drama	Chiwetel Ejiofor	Nominated	
Golden Globe Awards	January 12, 2014	Best Performance by an Actor in a Supporting Role – Motion Picture	Michael Fassbender	Nominated	
Golden Globe Awards	January 12, 2014	Best Performance by an Actress in a Supporting Role – Motion Picture	Lupita Nyong'o	Nominated	
Golden Globe Awards	January 12, 2014	Best Screenplay – Motion Picture	John Ridley	Nominated	
Golden Globe Awards	January 12, 2014	Best Original Score – Motion Picture	Hans Zimmer	Nominated	
Golden Tomato Awards	January 9, 2014	Wide Release	12 Years a Slave	Runner-up	
Golden Tomato Awards	January 9, 2014	Drama	12 Years a Slave	Won	
Gotham Awards	December 2, 2013	Audience Award	12 Years a Slave	Nominated	
Gotham Awards	December 2, 2013	Best Feature	12 Years a Slave	Nominated	
Gotham Awards	December 2, 2013	Best Actor	Chiwetel Ejiofor	Nominated	
Gotham Awards	December 2, 2013	Breakthrough Actor	Lupita Nyong'o	Nominated	
Guardian Film Awards	March 6, 2014	Best Film	12 Years a Slave	Nominated	
Guardian Film Awards	March 6, 2014	Best Director	Steve McQueen	Won	
Guardian Film Awards	March 6, 2014	Best Actor	Chiwetel Ejiofor	Nominated	
Guardian Film Awards	March 6, 2014	Best Supporting Actor	Michael Fassbender	Nominated	
Guardian Film Awards	March 6, 2014	Best Supporting Actor	Lupita Nyong'o	Nominated	
Guardian Film Awards	March 6, 2014	Best Scene	"Patsy returning with the soap"	Nominated	
Guardian Film Awards	March 6, 2014	Best Dialogue	Liza J Bennett	Nominated	
Guardian Film Awards	March 6, 2014	Biggest game-changer	12 Years a Slave	Nominated	
Guldbagge Awards	January 20, 2014	Best Foreign Film	12 Years a Slave	Nominated	
Hamptons International Film Festival	October 20, 2013	Breakthrough Performer	Lupita Nyong'o	Won	
Hollywood Film Festival	October 20, 2013	Breakthrough Directing	Steve McQueen	Won	
Hollywood Film Festival	October 20, 2013	New Hollywood Award	Lupita Nyong'o	Won	
Houston Film Critics Society	December 15, 2013	Best Picture	12 Years a Slave	Won	
Houston Film Critics Society	December 15, 2013	Best Director	Steve McQueen	Nominated	
Houston Film Critics Society	December 15, 2013	Best Actor	Chiwetel Ejiofor	Won	
Houston Film Critics Society	December 15, 2013	Best Supporting Actor	Michael Fassbender	Nominated	
Houston Film Critics Society	December 15, 2013	Best Supporting Actress	Lupita Nyong'o	Won	
Houston Film Critics Society	December 15, 2013	Best Screenplay	John Ridley	Won	
Houston Film Critics Society	December 15, 2013	Best Cinematography	Sean Bobbitt	Nominated	
Houston Film Critics Society	December 15, 2013	Best Original Score	Hans Zimmer	Nominated	
Independent Spirit Awards	March 1, 2014	Best Feature	12 Years a Slave	Won	
Independent Spirit Awards	March 1, 2014	Best Director	Steve McQueen	Won	
Independent Spirit Awards	March 1, 2014	Best Male Lead	Chiwetel Ejiofor	Nominated	
Independent Spirit Awards	March 1, 2014	Best Supporting Female	Lupita Nyong'o	Won	
Independent Spirit Awards	March 1, 2014	Best Supporting Male	Michael Fassbender	Nominated	
Independent Spirit Awards	March 1, 2014	Best Screenplay	John Ridley	Won	
Independent Spirit Awards	March 1, 2014	Best Cinematography	Sean Bobbitt	Won	
Irish Film & Television Academy	April 5, 2014	Best Supporting Actor	Michael Fassbender	Won	
Irish Film & Television Academy	April 5, 2014	Best International Film	12 Years a Slave	Nominated	
Irish Film & Television Academy	April 5, 2014	Best International Actor	Chiwetel Ejiofor	Won	
London Film Critics' Circle	February 2, 2014	Film of the Year	12 Years a Slave	Won	
London Film Critics' Circle	February 2, 2014	Director of the Year	Steve McQueen	Nominated	
London Film Critics' Circle	February 2, 2014	Actor of the Year	Chiwetel Ejiofor	Won	
London Film Critics' Circle	February 2, 2014	Supporting Actor of the Year	Michael Fassbender	Nominated	
London Film Critics' Circle	February 2, 2014	Supporting Actress of the Year	Lupita Nyong'o	Won	
London Film Critics' Circle	February 2, 2014	British Actor of the Year	Chiwetel Ejiofor	Nominated	
London Film Critics' Circle	February 2, 2014	British Actor of the Year	Michael Fassbender (12 Years a Slave and The Counselor)	Nominated	
London Film Critics' Circle	February 2, 2014	Screenwriter of the Year	John Ridley	Nominated	
London Film Critics' Circle	February 2, 2014	Technical Achievement Award	Sean Bobbitt (cinematography)	Nominated	
Los Angeles Film Critics Association	December 8, 2013	Best Actor	Chiwetel Ejiofor	Runner-up	
Los Angeles Film Critics Association	December 8, 2013	Best Supporting Actress	Lupita Nyong'o	Won	
Los Angeles Film Critics Association	December 8, 2013	Special Citation	The Creative Team of 12 Years a Slave	Won	
Mill Valley Film Festival	October 11, 2013	Overall Audience Favorite	12 Years a Slave	Won	
Mill Valley Film Festival	October 11, 2013	MVFF Award	Steve McQueen, and Chiwetel Ejiofor	Won	
Motion Picture Sound Editors Golden Reel Awards	February 16, 2014	Best Sound Editing: Music Score in a Feature Film	Katrina Schiller	Nominated	
Motion Picture Sound Editors Golden Reel Awards	February 16, 2014	Best Sound Editing: Sound Effects & Foley in a Feature Film	Ryan Collins, and Robert Jackson	Nominated	
Motion Picture Sound Editors Golden Reel Awards	February 16, 2014	Best Sound Editing: Dialogue & ADR in a Feature Film	Ryan Collins	Nominated	
MTV Movie & TV Awards	April 13, 2014	Movie of the Year	12 Years a Slave	Nominated	
MTV Movie & TV Awards	April 13, 2014	Best Male Performance	Chiwetel Ejiofor	Nominated	
MTV Movie & TV Awards	April 13, 2014	Best Female Performance	Lupita Nyong'o	Nominated	
MTV Movie & TV Awards	April 13, 2014	Best Villain	Michael Fassbender	Nominated	
NAACP Image Awards	February 22, 2014	Outstanding Motion Picture	12 Years a Slave	Won	
NAACP Image Awards	February 22, 2014	Directing in a Motion Picture	Steve McQueen	Won	
NAACP Image Awards	February 22, 2014	Writing in a Motion Picture	John Ridley	Won	
NAACP Image Awards	February 22, 2014	Outstanding Actor in a Motion Picture	Chiwetel Ejiofor	Nominated	
NAACP Image Awards	February 22, 2014	Supporting Actress in a Motion Picture	Alfre Woodard	Nominated	
NAACP Image Awards	February 22, 2014	Supporting Actress in a Motion Picture	Lupita Nyong'o	Won	
National Board of Review	December 4, 2013	Top Ten Films	12 Years a Slave	Won	
National Society of Film Critics	January 4, 2014	Best Picture	12 Years a Slave	Runner-up	
National Society of Film Critics	January 4, 2014	Best Director	Steve McQueen	Runner-up	
National Society of Film Critics	January 4, 2014	Best Actor	Chiwetel Ejiofor	Runner-up	
National Society of Film Critics	January 4, 2014	Best Supporting Actress	Lupita Nyong'o	Runner-up	
New York Film Critics Circle	December 3, 2013	Best Film	12 Years a Slave	Runner-up	
New York Film Critics Circle	December 3, 2013	Best Director	Steve McQueen	Won	
New York Film Critics Circle	December 3, 2013	Best Actor	Chiwetel Ejiofor	Runner-up	
New York Film Critics Circle	December 3, 2013	Best Supporting Actor	Michael Fassbender	Runner-up	
New York Film Critics Circle	December 3, 2013	Best Supporting Actress	Lupita Nyong'o	Runner-up	
New York Film Critics Online	December 8, 2013	Top Films	12 Years a Slave	Won	
New York Film Critics Online	December 8, 2013	Best Picture	12 Years a Slave	Won	
New York Film Critics Online	December 8, 2013	Best Actor	Chiwetel Ejiofor	Won	
New York Film Critics Online	December 8, 2013	Best Supporting Actress	Lupita Nyong'o	Won	
Online Film Critics Society	December 16, 2013	Best Picture	12 Years a Slave	Won	
Online Film Critics Society	December 16, 2013	Best Director	Steve McQueen	Nominated	
Online Film Critics Society	December 16, 2013	Best Actor	Chiwetel Ejiofor	Won	
Online Film Critics Society	December 16, 2013	Best Supporting Actor	Michael Fassbender	Won	
Online Film Critics Society	December 16, 2013	Best Supporting Actress	Lupita Nyong'o	Won	
Online Film Critics Society	December 16, 2013	Best Adapted Screenplay	John Ridley	Won	
Online Film Critics Society	December 16, 2013	Best Cinematography	Sean Bobbitt	Nominated	
Online Film Critics Society	December 16, 2013	Best Editing	Joe Walker	Nominated	
Palm Springs International Film Festival	January 13, 2014	Director of the Year Award	Steve McQueen	Won	
Palm Springs International Film Festival	January 13, 2014	Breakthrough Performance	Lupita Nyong'o	Won	
Producers Guild of America Award	January 19, 2014	Best Theatrical Motion Picture	Anthony Katagas, Jeremy Kleiner, Steve McQueen, Brad Pitt, and Dede Gardner (tied with Alfonso Cuarón and David Heyman for Gravity)	Won (Tied)	
San Diego Film Critics Society	December 11, 2013	Best Film	12 Years a Slave	Nominated	
San Diego Film Critics Society	December 11, 2013	Best Director	Steve McQueen	Nominated	
San Diego Film Critics Society	December 11, 2013	Best Actor	Chiwetel Ejiofor	Nominated	
San Diego Film Critics Society	December 11, 2013	Best Supporting Actor	Michael Fassbender	Nominated	
San Diego Film Critics Society	December 11, 2013	Best Supporting Actress	Lupita Nyong'o	Nominated	
San Diego Film Critics Society	December 11, 2013	Best Adapted Screenplay	John Ridley	Nominated	
San Diego Film Critics Society	December 11, 2013	Best Ensemble	12 Years a Slave	Nominated	
San Diego Film Critics Society	December 11, 2013	Best Editing	Joe Walker	Nominated	
San Diego Film Critics Society	December 11, 2013	Best Original Score	Hans Zimmer	Nominated	
San Diego Film Critics Society	December 11, 2013	Best Production Design	Adam Stockhausen, and Alice Baker	Nominated	
San Francisco Film Critics Circle	December 15, 2013	Best Picture	12 Years a Slave	Won	
San Francisco Film Critics Circle	December 15, 2013	Best Director	Steve McQueen	Nominated	
San Francisco Film Critics Circle	December 15, 2013	Best Actor	Chiwetel Ejiofor	Won	
San Francisco Film Critics Circle	December 15, 2013	Best Supporting Actor	Michael Fassbender	Nominated	
San Francisco Film Critics Circle	December 15, 2013	Best Supporting Actress	Lupita Nyong'o	Nominated	
San Francisco Film Critics Circle	December 15, 2013	Best Adapted Screenplay	John Ridley	Won	
San Francisco Film Critics Circle	December 15, 2013	Best Cinematography	Sean Bobbitt	Nominated	
San Francisco Film Critics Circle	December 15, 2013	Best Editing	Joe Walker	Nominated	
San Francisco Film Critics Circle	December 15, 2013	Best Production Design	Adam Stockhausen	Nominated	
Satellite Awards	February 23, 2014	Best Motion Picture	12 Years a Slave	Won	
Satellite Awards	February 23, 2014	Best Director	Steve McQueen	Won	
Satellite Awards	February 23, 2014	Best Actor – Motion Picture	Chiwetel Ejiofor	Nominated	
Satellite Awards	February 23, 2014	Best Supporting Actor – Motion Picture	Michael Fassbender	Nominated	
Satellite Awards	February 23, 2014	Best Supporting Actress – Motion Picture	Lupita Nyong'o	Nominated	
Satellite Awards	February 23, 2014	Best Adapted Screenplay	John Ridley	Nominated	
Satellite Awards	February 23, 2014	Best Cinematography	Sean Bobbitt	Nominated	
Satellite Awards	February 23, 2014	Best Costume Design	Patricia Norris	Nominated	
Satellite Awards	February 23, 2014	Best Editing	Joe Walker	Nominated	
Satellite Awards	February 23, 2014	Best Original Score	Hans Zimmer	Nominated	
Saturn Awards	June 26, 2014	Best Independent Film	12 Years a Slave	Won	
Screen Actors Guild Awards	January 18, 2014	Outstanding Performance by a Cast in a Motion Picture	Benedict Cumberbatch, Paul Dano, Garret Dillahunt, Chiwetel Ejiofor, Michael Fassbender, Paul Giamatti, Scoot McNairy, Lupita Nyong'o, Adepero Oduye, Sarah Paulson, Brad Pitt, Michael Kenneth Williams, and Alfre Woodard	Nominated	
Screen Actors Guild Awards	January 18, 2014	Outstanding Performance by a Male Actor in a Leading Role	Chiwetel Ejiofor	Nominated	
Screen Actors Guild Awards	January 18, 2014	Outstanding Performance by a Male Actor in a Supporting Role	Michael Fassbender	Nominated	
Screen Actors Guild Awards	January 18, 2014	Outstanding Performance by a Female Actor in a Supporting Role	Lupita Nyong'o	Won	
Screen Nation Awards	February 23, 2014	Favourite International Movie	12 Years a Slave	Won	
Screen Nation Awards	February 23, 2014	Male Performance in Film	Chiwetel Ejiofor	Won	
Screen Nation Awards	February 23, 2014	Favourite Female African Rising Screen Talent	Lupita Nyong'o	Won	
St. Louis Film Critics Association	December 16, 2013	Best Film	12 Years a Slave	Won	
St. Louis Film Critics Association	December 16, 2013	Best Director	Steve McQueen	Won	
St. Louis Film Critics Association	December 16, 2013	Best Actor	Chiwetel Ejiofor	Won	
St. Louis Film Critics Association	December 16, 2013	Best Supporting Actor	Michael Fassbender	Nominated	
St. Louis Film Critics Association	December 16, 2013	Best Supporting Actress	Lupita Nyong'o	Won	
St. Louis Film Critics Association	December 16, 2013	Best Adapted Screenplay	John Ridley, and Solomon Northup	Won	
St. Louis Film Critics Association	December 16, 2013	Best Art Direction	Adam Stockhausen (production designer), and Alice Baker (set decorator)	Nominated	
St. Louis Film Critics Association	December 16, 2013	Best Cinematography	Sean Bobbitt	Won	
St. Louis Film Critics Association	December 16, 2013	Best Musical Score	Hans Zimmer	Nominated	
St. Louis Film Critics Association	December 16, 2013	Best Scene	"The hanging scene"	Won	
Stockholm International Film Festival	November 14, 2013	Bronze Horse for Best Film – Special Mention	Steve McQueen	Won	
Stockholm International Film Festival	November 14, 2013	Best Film Music	Hans Zimmer	Won	
Toronto Film Critics Association	December 17, 2013	Best Film	12 Years a Slave	Runner-up	
Toronto Film Critics Association	December 17, 2013	Best Director	Steve McQueen	Runner-up	
Toronto Film Critics Association	December 17, 2013	Best Actor	Chiwetel Ejiofor	Runner-up	
Toronto Film Critics Association	December 17, 2013	Best Supporting Actor	Michael Fassbender	Runner-up	
Toronto Film Critics Association	December 17, 2013	Best Supporting Actress	Lupita Nyong'o	Runner-up	
Toronto International Film Festival	September 15, 2013	People's Choice Award	Steve McQueen	Won	
USC Libraries Scripter Award	February 8, 2014	Best Adapted Screenplay	John Ridley (screenwriter), and Solomon Northup (author)	Won	
Vancouver Film Critics Circle	January 7, 2014	Best Film	12 Years a Slave	Won	
Vancouver Film Critics Circle	January 7, 2014	Best Actor	Chiwetel Ejiofor	Nominated	
Vancouver Film Critics Circle	January 7, 2014	Best Supporting Actor	Michael Fassbender	Nominated	
Vancouver Film Critics Circle	January 7, 2014	Best Supporting Actress	Lupita Nyong'o	Nominated	
Vancouver Film Critics Circle	January 7, 2014	Best Director	Steve McQueen	Nominated	
Vancouver Film Critics Circle	January 7, 2014	Best Screenplay	John Ridley	Nominated	
Village Voice Film Poll	December 22, 2013	Best Director	Steve McQueen	Won	
Village Voice Film Poll	December 22, 2013	Best Actor	Chiwetel Ejiofor	Won	
Village Voice Film Poll	December 22, 2013	Best Supporting Actor	Michael Fassbender	Runner-up	
Village Voice Film Poll	December 22, 2013	Best Supporting Actress	Lupita Nyong'o	Won	
Washington D.C. Area Film Critics Association	December 9, 2013	Best Film	12 Years a Slave	Won	
Washington D.C. Area Film Critics Association	December 9, 2013	Best Director	Steve McQueen	Nominated	
Washington D.C. Area Film Critics Association	December 9, 2013	Best Actor	Chiwetel Ejiofor	Won	
Washington D.C. Area Film Critics Association	December 9, 2013	Best Supporting Actor	Michael Fassbender	Nominated	
Washington D.C. Area Film Critics Association	December 9, 2013	Best Supporting Actress	Lupita Nyong'o	Won	
Washington D.C. Area Film Critics Association	December 9, 2013	Best Acting Ensemble	12 Years a Slave	Won	
Washington D.C. Area Film Critics Association	December 9, 2013	Best Adapted Screenplay	John Ridley	Won	
Washington D.C. Area Film Critics Association	December 9, 2013	Best Art Direction	Adam Stockhausen (production designer), and Alice Baker (set decorator)	Nominated	
Washington D.C. Area Film Critics Association	December 9, 2013	Best Cinematography	Sean Bobbitt	Nominated	
Washington D.C. Area Film Critics Association	December 9, 2013	Best Editing	Joe Walker	Nominated	
Washington D.C. Area Film Critics Association	December 9, 2013	Best Score	Hans Zimmer	Won	
Women Film Critics Circle	December 17, 2013	Best Actor	Chiwetel Ejiofor	Won	
Women Film Critics Circle	December 17, 2013	Best Male Images in a Movie	Chiwetel Ejiofor	Won	
Women Film Critics Circle	December 17, 2013	Josephine Baker Award	12 Years a Slave	Won	

== See also ==
- 2013 in film
