= Outstanding Supporting Actor =

Outstanding supporting actor may refer one of several different awards, including:

- Daytime Emmy Award for Outstanding Supporting Actor in a Drama Series
- NAACP Image Award for Outstanding Supporting Actor in a Motion Picture
- Primetime Emmy Award for Outstanding Supporting Actor in a Comedy Series
- Primetime Emmy Award for Outstanding Supporting Actor in a Drama Series
- Primetime Emmy Award for Outstanding Supporting Actor in a Limited Series or Movie
- Screen Actors Guild Award for Outstanding Performance by a Male Actor in a Supporting Role

== See also ==
- Supporting actor
- List of awards for supporting actor
