= Best Supporting Actress =

Best Supporting Actress may refer to one of many awards, including:

- Academy Award for Best Supporting Actress
- AACTA International Award for Best Supporting Actress
- Bengal Film Journalists' Association – Best Supporting Actress Award
  - BFJA Awards for Best Supporting Actress (Hindi)
- Black Reel Award: Best Supporting Actress
- Blue Dragon Film Award for Best Supporting Actress
- Bollywood Movie Award – Best Supporting Actress
- Boston Society of Film Critics Award for Best Supporting Actress
- Broadcast Film Critics Association Award for Best Supporting Actress
- César Award for Best Supporting Actress
- Citra Award for Best Supporting Actress
- Chicago Film Critics Association Award for Best Supporting Actress
- Dallas-Fort Worth Film Critics Association Award for Best Supporting Actress
- David di Donatello for Best Supporting Actress
- Empire Award for Best Supporting Actress
- Filmfare Award for Best Supporting Actress
  - Filmfare Award for Best Supporting Actress – Kannada
  - Filmfare Award for Best Supporting Actress – Malayalam
  - Filmfare Award for Best Supporting Actress – Marathi
  - Filmfare Award for Best Supporting Actress – Tamil
  - Filmfare Award for Best Supporting Actress – Telugu
- Florida Film Critics Circle Award for Best Supporting Actress
- GIFA Best Supporting Actress Award (Global Indian Film Awards)
- Golden Calf Award for Best Supporting Actress
- Golden Globe Award for Best Supporting Actress – Motion Picture
- Golden Horse Award for Best Supporting Actress
- Best Supporting Actress (Golden Rooster Awards)
- Goya Award for Best Supporting Actress
- Hong Kong Film Award for Best Supporting Actress
- Hundred Flowers Award for Best Supporting Actress
- IIFA Award for Best Supporting Actress (International Indian Film Academy)
- ITFA Best Supporting Actress Award (International Tamil Film Awards)
- Karnataka State Film Award for Best Supporting Actress
- Kerala Film Critics Association Award for Best Supporting Actress
- Los Angeles Film Critics Association Award for Best Supporting Actress
- Luna Award for Best Supporting Actress
- Maharashtra State Film Award for Best Supporting Actress
- MFK Award for Favourite Supporting Actress (Maharashtracha Favourite Kon?)
- Nandi Award for Best Supporting Actress
- National Board of Review Award for Best Supporting Actress
- National Film Award for Best Supporting Actress
- National Society of Film Critics Award for Best Supporting Actress
- New York Film Critics Circle Award for Best Supporting Actress
- Norway Tamil Film Festival Award for Best Supporting Actress
- Odisha State Film Award for Best supporting Actress
- Online Film Critics Society Award for Best Supporting Actress
- Polish Academy Award for Best Supporting Actress
- San Diego Film Critics Society Award for Best Supporting Actress
- San Francisco Film Critics Circle Award for Best Supporting Actress
- Satellite Award for Best Supporting Actress – Motion Picture
- Saturn Award for Best Supporting Actress
- Screen Award for Best Supporting Actress
- St. Louis Gateway Film Critics Association Award for Best Supporting Actress
- Stardust Award for Best Supporting Actress
- Tamil Nadu State Film Award for Best Supporting Actress
- Toronto Film Critics Association Award for Best Supporting Actress
- Vancouver Film Critics Circle Award for Best Supporting Actress
- Vijay Award for Best Supporting Actress
- Washington D.C. Area Film Critics Association Award for Best Supporting Actress
- Zee Chitra Gaurav Puraskar for Best Supporting Actress

== See also ==
- Best Supporting Actor (disambiguation)
- Best Actress in a Supporting Role (disambiguation)
- List of awards for supporting actor#Female
