= Best Actress in a Supporting Role =

Best Actress in a Supporting Role may refer to:

- AACTA Award for Best Actress in a Supporting Role
- BAFTA Award for Best Actress in a Supporting Role
- Fakt Marathi Cine Sanman for Best Actress in a Supporting Role (India)
- Gold Award for Best Actress in a Supporting Role (by Zee TV for Indian television)
- Indian Telly Award for Best Actress in a Supporting Role
- ITA Award for Best Actress in a Supporting Role (Indian Television Academy)
- National Film Award for Best Actress in a Supporting Role (India)
- Producers Guild Film Award for Best Actress in a Supporting Role (India)
- West Bengal Film Journalists' Association Award for Best Actress in a Supporting Role (India)

== See also ==
- Best Actor in a Supporting Role (disambiguation)
- Best Supporting Actress (disambiguation)
- List of awards for supporting actor#Female
