= Siesta Key (TV series) =

2017 American reality television series

- Genre: Reality television
- Created by: Mark Ford; Warren Skeels
- Starring: Alex Kompothecras; Juliette Porter; Brandon Gomes; Madisson Hausburg; Garrett Miller; Kelsey Owens; Chloe Trautman-Long; Amanda Miller; Sam Logan; Cara Geswelli; Jordana Barnes
- Opening theme: "Cut to the Feeling" by Carly Rae Jepsen
- Country of origin: United States
- Original language: English
- No. of seasons: 5
- No. of episodes: 91

Production
- Executive producers: Gary Kompothecras; Mark Ford; Tara Long; Kevin Lopez; Tom Danon; Cecily Deutsch; Warren Skeels; Elizabeth Jones
- Producers: Sam Wasserman; Phil LaCroix
- Running time: 42 minutes
- Production company: Entertainment One Television

Original release
- Network: MTV
- Release: July 31, 2017 – January 19, 2023

Siesta Key is an American reality television series that premiered on MTV from July 31, 2017 to January 19, 2023. The show is inspired by the mid-2000s reality television series Laguna Beach: The Real Orange County. The fifth season, subtitled Miami Moves, premiered on October 27, 2022.

== Synopsis ==
Following an exclusive group of friends as they come of age in Siesta Key, Florida, confronting issues of love, betrayal, class and adulthood.

== Production ==
On October 2, 2017, MTV ordered eight additional episodes, bringing the first season to a total of 18 episodes. The episodes premiered on January 15, 2018. On December 17, 2018, it was announced that the show would be returning for a second season, which premiered with two episodes on January 22, 2019. On May 13, 2019, MTV announced that the show had been renewed for a third season, which premiered on January 7, 2020. On November 18, 2020, the series was renewed for a fourth season, which premiered on May 12, 2021.

The first four seasons were filmed in Sarasota, Florida. The fifth season, filmed in Miami and subtitled Miami Moves, premiered on MTV on October 27, 2022.

== Cast ==
=== Timeline of cast members ===
Cast member	Seasons				
Cast member	1	2	3	4	5
Alex Kompothecras	Main	Main	Main		
Juliette Porter	Main	Main	Main	Main	Main
Brandon Gomes	Main	Main	Main	Main	Main
Madisson Hausburg	Main	Main	Main	Main	Main
Garrett Miller	Main	Main	Main	Main	
Kelsey Owens	Main	Main	Main	Main	Friend
Chloe Trautman-Long	Main	Main	Main	Main	Main
Amanda Miller	Friend	Friend	Friend	Main	Main
Sam Logan			Friend	Main	Main
Cara Geswelli		Friend	Friend	Friend	Main
Jordana Barnes				Friend	Main
Recurring cast members
Paul Apostolides	Friend	Friend	Friend		
Canvas Brummel	Friend	Friend			
Paige Hausburg	Friend		Friend		
Tarik Jenkins	Friend				
Ben Riney	Friend	Friend	Friend		
Alex Rubino	Friend				
Lexie Salameh	Friend	Friend	Friend	Friend	Friend
Hannah Starr	Friend		Friend	Friend	
Carson Wall	Friend	Friend	Friend		
Camilla Cattaneo		Friend	Friend	Friend	
Jared Kelderman		Friend	Friend		
Tawni Nix		Friend			
Alana Sherman		Friend			
Kelly Firek			Friend	Friend	
Robby Hayes			Friend		
Joe Jenkins			Friend	Friend	
JJ Mizell			Friend		
Ashley Nichols			Friend		
Jake Petersen			Friend		
Alyssa Salerno			Friend		
Ish Soto			Friend	Friend	Friend
Tate Sweatt			Friend	Friend	
Mike Vazquez			Friend	Friend	Friend
Meghan Bischoff				Friend	Friend
Clark Drum				Friend	Friend
Will Gray				Friend	
Serena Kerrigan				Friend	
Chris Long				Friend	Friend
Kenna Quesenberry				Friend	
Max Strong				Friend	
Michael Wheary				Friend	Friend
Teenear Lucas					Friend
Christine Pierre					Friend

== Episodes ==
=== Series overview ===
Season	Episodes	Originally released	
Season	Episodes	First released	Last released
1	18	July 31, 2017	March 5, 2018
2	12	January 22, 2019	April 2, 2019
3	24	January 7, 2020	August 25, 2020
4	25	May 12, 2021	May 26, 2022
5	12	October 27, 2022	January 19, 2023

=== Season 1 (2017–18) ===
No. overall	No. in season	Title	Original release date	U.S. viewers (millions)
1	1	"Romeo and Juliette"	July 31, 2017	0.67
Siesta Key's biggest heartthrob Alex finds himself torn between choosing his high school sweetheart Madisson or his last summer fling Juliette.
2	2	"We Need to Talk About Chloe"	August 7, 2017	0.61
Chloe has an unexpected turn taken around her when one of her best friends steals her crush, Brandon. However, little did they know, neither of them would last for long.
3	3	"Kelsey's New Crew"	August 14, 2017	0.57
Siesta's newest couple Garrett and Kelsey's relationship gets tested when Alex tries to make a move on his girl. Kelsey accepts with open arms, causing her to question her relationship with Garrett. Chloe takes actions upon herself to try to fix her anger and destructive behavior.
4	4	"Alex's Kingdom"	August 21, 2017	0.44
After a one-time thing with Amanda, Alex is unsure if he should tell Juliette. Kelsey and Garrett grow farther apart just in time for Alex to slip in and steal Garrett's girl. Madisson is over the Alex drama and begins to catch feels for Brandon... Alex's best friend.
5	5	"Madisson's Avenues"	August 28, 2017	0.54
Alex and Kelsey start to spice things up in the hot tub at Alex's, leaving Garrett unsure of what to believe or do. A little fire begins between Brandon and Madisson, and Chloe is still unsure about where she and Amanda stand in their friendship after all the drama.
6	6	"Juliette's Bahama Drama"	September 4, 2017	0.60
The group takes a little vacation to Bimini, yet Juliette cannot help but feel jealous when she sees Kelsey and Alex together, as they become a little less secretive. Brandon and Madisson are growing hotter and hotter the more they are together.
7	7	"Messy Messy Kelsey"	September 11, 2017	0.54
Kelsey keeps complicating things between Alex and Garrett just as Juliette is through with feeling like the second option. Chloe decides to distance herself a bit. Madisson is proposed with an offer from an old love, leaving her wondering about Brandon and if they would actually work.
8	8	"Garrett Gets a Girl"	September 18, 2017	0.65
Chloe throws a huge celebration at her new apartment, and things get heated with Juliette and Garrett. Switch of relationships? Pauly spends a night in jail after Chloe doesn't invite some of the group to her party trying to avoid drama.
9	9	"Chloe at a Crossroads"	September 25, 2017	0.60
Juliette and Garrett grow closer as Alex begins to pull away from Kelsey, leaving her stunned and wondering if she made the right choice. Alex tries to fix his friendship with Chloe after their falling-out, while Madisson and Brandon begin their relationship at a new level.
10	10	"Juliette's Midsummer Dream"	October 2, 2017	0.52
What Juliette thought was only to make Alex and Kelsey jealous starts to turn into more than that. Alex confronts one of the girls as he realized he lost one of the best things he has ever had... but it is not Juliette.
11	11	"Much Ado About Juliette"	January 15, 2018	0.61
A new girl comes into the picture, leaving Brandon not being a good boyfriend, or so we think. Boyfriend-flirting Canvas couldn't care less about Madisson and is strictly all about herself. Alex gets into a bad fight that leaves his jaw wired shut. Juliette hears some new information, causing her to make a scene after hearing it.
12	12	"Chloe's Birthday Battle Royale"	January 22, 2018	0.62
After finally having enough, Madisson confronts boyfriend-flirting Canvas at Chloe's birthday party. Garrett cannot seem to get Kelsey off his mind, sending Juliette right back to the familiarity of Alex again.
13	13	"Juliette, Interrupted"	January 29, 2018	0.62
Madisson and Brandon try to rekindle their relationship as Juliette heads happily back to school being back with Alex. The emotion changes quick when Alex surprise visits her causing some drama between Juliette and her bff Hannah.
14	14	"Kelsey's Reality Bites"	February 5, 2018	0.59
Finally it has come out about Juliette and Alex. While both Kelsey and Madisson take a journey to NYC for some interviews, Brandon is not being the boyfriend Madisson thought she left back in Siesta. This night forever changed their relationship.
15	15	"Nightmare on Bradisson Street"	February 12, 2018	0.60
Juliette tries to come back into the group and Kelsey and Garrett are discussing working on things. Brandon tries to hide his mistakes as Chloe and boyfriend-flirting Canvas will not let it die until they know the truth.
16	16	"Take a Paige from Canvas"	February 19, 2018	0.55
After a charity event, Garrett meets a new girl taking the attention back off Kelsey just as she thought she was winning him back. Hannah and Juliette continue to fight over Alex, of course. A new romance has sparked although Madisson will not be happy about it.
17	17	"Alex Won't Kompomise"	February 26, 2018	0.49
After breaking the news to Madisson, her sister Paige and boyfriend-flirting Canvas are slowly starting to spend more time together. Madisson brings over her new interest and Brandon is not happy to see them. Alex and Hannah keep butting heads making Juliette choose between the boy or her best friend.
18	18	"Juliette's Great Expectations"	March 5, 2018	0.54
Brandon puts everything into the last try of getting Madisson back, while Kelsey finally tells Garrett exactly how she feels yet the result may not have been the one she wanted. Juliette and Alex have a fight leaving us wondering what their fate would be after season 1 ends.

=== Season 2 (2019) ===
No. overall	No. in season	Title	Original release date	U.S. viewers (millions)
19	1	"Born a King."	January 22, 2019	0.53
Juliette's parents and Alex's parents meet, Madisson is unsure about her future with Ben, and Alex's birthday party goes off the rails when uninvited guests show up.
20	2	"Your Own Hairdresser!"	January 22, 2019	0.54
21	3	"Sorry! I Don't Owe You Anything"	January 29, 2019	0.62
22	4	"Don't Come to My Trip!"	February 5, 2019	0.52
23	5	"How Am I a Lot to Handle?!"	February 12, 2019	0.62
24	6	"A Second Tier Friend"	February 19, 2019	0.53
25	7	"It's Been a Day."	February 26, 2019	0.55
26	8	"Deflect, Deflect, Deflect."	March 5, 2019	0.47
27	9	"Cheers to Sunday Funday!"	March 12, 2019	0.44
28	10	"I Had High Hopes for You."	March 19, 2019	0.64
29	11	"I Want Him (Without the Cheating)."	March 26, 2019	0.54
30	12	"Cheers to the End of Summer!"	April 2, 2019	0.52

=== Season 3 (2020) ===
No. overall	No. in season	Title	Original release date	U.S. viewers (millions)
31	1	"What Are Your Real Intentions with Juliette?"	January 7, 2020	0.43
32	2	"New Man, Who Dis?"	January 14, 2020	0.47
33	3	"Where's My Apology?"	January 21, 2020	0.45
34	4	"Are You Offended? Because You Should Be!"	January 28, 2020	0.48
35	5	"Why Are You with Somebody Who Doesn't Deserve You?"	February 4, 2020	0.59
36	6	"Are You Happy with Her?"	February 11, 2020	0.50
37	7	"What's Really Going on with You and Alex?"	February 18, 2020	0.62
38	8	"So You're the Ex-Wife?"	February 25, 2020	0.47
39	9	"Why Don't You Just Mind Your Own Damn Business?"	March 3, 2020	0.43
40	10	"Are You Stalking Me?"	March 3, 2020	0.39
41	11	"What If It Goes Completely South?"	March 10, 2020	0.40
42	12	"Where Did You Sleep Last Night?"	March 10, 2020	0.42
43	13	"I'm Not Letting Him Get Away with It"	June 16, 2020	0.59
44	14	"I'm Not Asking for Any Judgment"	June 23, 2020	0.56
45	15	"I'm Ready for a Good Guy"	June 30, 2020	0.47
46	16	"I'm Gonna Be Drunk for the Next Week"	July 7, 2020	0.52
47	17	"I Just Didn't Think It Was Going to Happen So Fast"	July 14, 2020	0.50
48	18	"I'm Thankful"	July 21, 2020	0.51
49	19	"I Want Him to Have a Girl"	July 28, 2020	0.46
50	20	"Can I Talk to You for a Second?"	August 4, 2020	0.49
51	21	"I Didn't Even Know That You Were That Into Bathing Suits"	August 11, 2020	0.51
52	22	"I'm Falling for Sam"	August 18, 2020	0.55
53	23	"I'm Actually Like Happy"	August 25, 2020	0.50
54	24	"Reunion"	August 25, 2020	0.45

=== Season 4 (2021–22) ===
No. overall	No. in season	Title	Original release date	U.S. viewers (millions)
55	1	"Let's Be Healthy and Get Drunk"	May 12, 2021	0.43
56	2	"It's a Nasty, Low Vibrational Thing to Say"	May 19, 2021	N/A
57	3	"Here's the Thing With the Prenup..."	May 26, 2021	N/A
58	4	"I Can't Help if Someone Is Attracted to Me"	June 2, 2021	N/A
59	5	"Happy to See Me, Right?"	June 16, 2021	0.32
60	6	"You Don't Seem Like the Caring Type"	June 23, 2021	0.38
61	7	"Things Will Never Be the Same"	June 30, 2021	0.38
62	8	"That Girl Is Lost"	July 7, 2021	0.43
63	9	"Compassion and Kindness Is the Way to Go"	July 14, 2021	0.33
64	10	"I'm Truly, Truly, Very, Very Sorry"	July 21, 2021	0.31
65	11	"We Can All Use a Little Empathy"	July 28, 2021	N/A
66	12	"I Just Want to Move On/We Just Stay Separate"	August 4, 2021	0.30
67	13	"Reunion"	August 4, 2021	0.24
68	14	"24 and Still a Mess"	March 10, 2022	0.40
69	15	"You ARE the Rich Husband!"	March 17, 2022	0.24
70	16	"Do You Even Want to Try?"	March 24, 2022	0.19
71	17	"He Doesn't See a Future"	March 31, 2022	0.24
72	18	"Deux Chardonnay"	April 7, 2022	0.26
73	19	"Stop Texting Me, Stop Calling Me"	April 14, 2022	0.22
74	20	"Stop Videotaping"	April 21, 2022	0.28
75	21	"I Was Living a Lie with Him"	April 28, 2022	0.23
76	22	"Someone Sent a Video"	May 5, 2022	0.23
77	23	"Where's the Popcorn?"	May 12, 2022	0.28
78	24	"You're Moving?"	May 19, 2022	0.27
79	25	"Tiny"	May 26, 2022	0.26

=== Season 5: Miami Moves (2022–23) ===
No. overall	No. in season	Title	Original release date	U.S. viewers (millions)
80	1	"Welcome to Miami"	October 27, 2022	0.28
81	2	"You Are in a Huge Pond Now"	November 3, 2022	0.23
82	3	"Ask Your Best Friend"	November 10, 2022	0.25
83	4	"He Was Flirting with Her"	November 17, 2022	0.26
84	5	"We Gotta Put on a Good Show"	December 1, 2022	0.26
85	6	"This TV Show Changed You"	December 8, 2022	0.23
86	7	"Our Best Friend's Ex-Boyfriend's Shirt"	December 15, 2022	0.24
87	8	"He's Never Picked You"	December 22, 2022	0.24
88	9	"How Do You Know It's Toxic?"	December 29, 2022	0.23
89	10	"It's Not About the Bathing Suit"	January 5, 2023	0.25
90	11	"Is It Worth the Risk?"	January 12, 2023	0.27
91	12	"I'm Not Going Back to Siesta Key"	January 19, 2023	0.27

== Controversy and criticism ==
The series was controversial prior to airing, due to star Alex Kompothecras being a friend of four Florida men who engaged in a viral act of animal cruelty by dragging a live shark behind a boat. Kompothecras was caught on camera shooting a shark, and also had uploaded racist posts to Instagram. The premiere party was cancelled after death threats were made against the cast.

On June 16, 2020, MTV announced that they parted ways with Alex Kompothecras and that the second half of season 3 would be re-edited to reflect that.
