= Satellite Award for Best Supporting Actor =

Satellite Award for Best Supporting Actor may refer to:

- Satellite Award for Best Supporting Actor – Motion Picture or
- Satellite Award for Best Supporting Actor – Series, Miniseries or Television Film
- Satellite Award for Best Supporting Actor – Television Series (2002–2006)
