= Outstanding Supporting Actress =

Outstanding Supporting Actress may refer to one of several awards, including:

- Daytime Emmy Award for Outstanding Supporting Actress in a Drama Series
- NAACP Image Award for Outstanding Supporting Actress in a Motion Picture
- Primetime Emmy Award for Outstanding Supporting Actress in a Comedy Series
- Primetime Emmy Award for Outstanding Supporting Actress in a Drama Series
- Primetime Emmy Award for Outstanding Supporting Actress in a Limited Series or Movie
- Screen Actors Guild Award for Outstanding Performance by a Female Actor in a Supporting Role

== See also ==
- List of awards for supporting actor
