= Under-five =

TV or film actor whose character has fewer than five lines of dialogue

An under-five, also known as an under-5 or a U/5, is a television or film actor whose character has fewer than five lines of dialogue. The term is used in SAG-AFTRA contracts and has been used when referring to performers in a daytime soap opera.

== SAG-AFTRA rules ==
An under-five role falls between an extra (a nonspeaking role) and a day player (a full part). Per SAG-AFTRA, for an under-five the total number of words in the five lines or less must be below 50. Exceeding this reclassifies the role as a full part, which constitutes a substantial rise in pay. An extra may be upgraded to under-five status if they interact with principals or are given direction in a way that furthers the plot.

Prior to the 2012 merger of the Screen Actors Guild (SAG) and the American Federation of Television and Radio Artists (AFTRA), actors performing as under-fives as members of AFTRA became eligible for SAG membership after one year. Post merger, actors performing with an under-five contract operate as members of the consolidated union.

Through November 16, 2016, the minimum pay rate for an under-five actor on a soap opera is $451 for a one-hour show, and $369 for a 1/2-hour show. By comparison, the minimum pay rate for a principal on a soap opera is $1,038 for a one-hour show, and $778 for a 1/2-hour show. The pay rate for a background actor on a soap opera is $150 for a 1-hour show, and $115 for a 1/2-hour show.

== Under-five work ==
An under-five role can be a stepping stone to bigger roles. However, with the general decline of American soap operas, the number of under-fives, extras, and even day players employed has declined, due to reductions of production budgets.

== See also ==
- Bit part
