= Extra (acting) =

Nonspeaking or nonsinging acting role

An extra or background actor is a performer in a film, television show, stage, musical, opera, or ballet production who appears in a nonspeaking or nonsinging (silent) capacity, usually in the background (for example, in an audience or busy street scene). War films and epic films often employ background actors in large numbers: some films have featured hundreds or even thousands of paid background actors as cast members (hence the term "cast of thousands"). Likewise, grand opera can involve many background actors appearing in spectacular productions.

On a film or TV set, background actors are usually referred to as "supporting artists", "junior artists", "atmosphere", "background talent", "background performers", "background artists", "background cast members", "talent", "background friends", or simply "background", while the term "extra" is rarely used and is often considered derogatory. In a stage production, background actors are commonly referred to as "supernumeraries". A more archaic theatre term is "sword carriers". In opera and ballet, they are called either "extras" or "supers".

== Casting ==
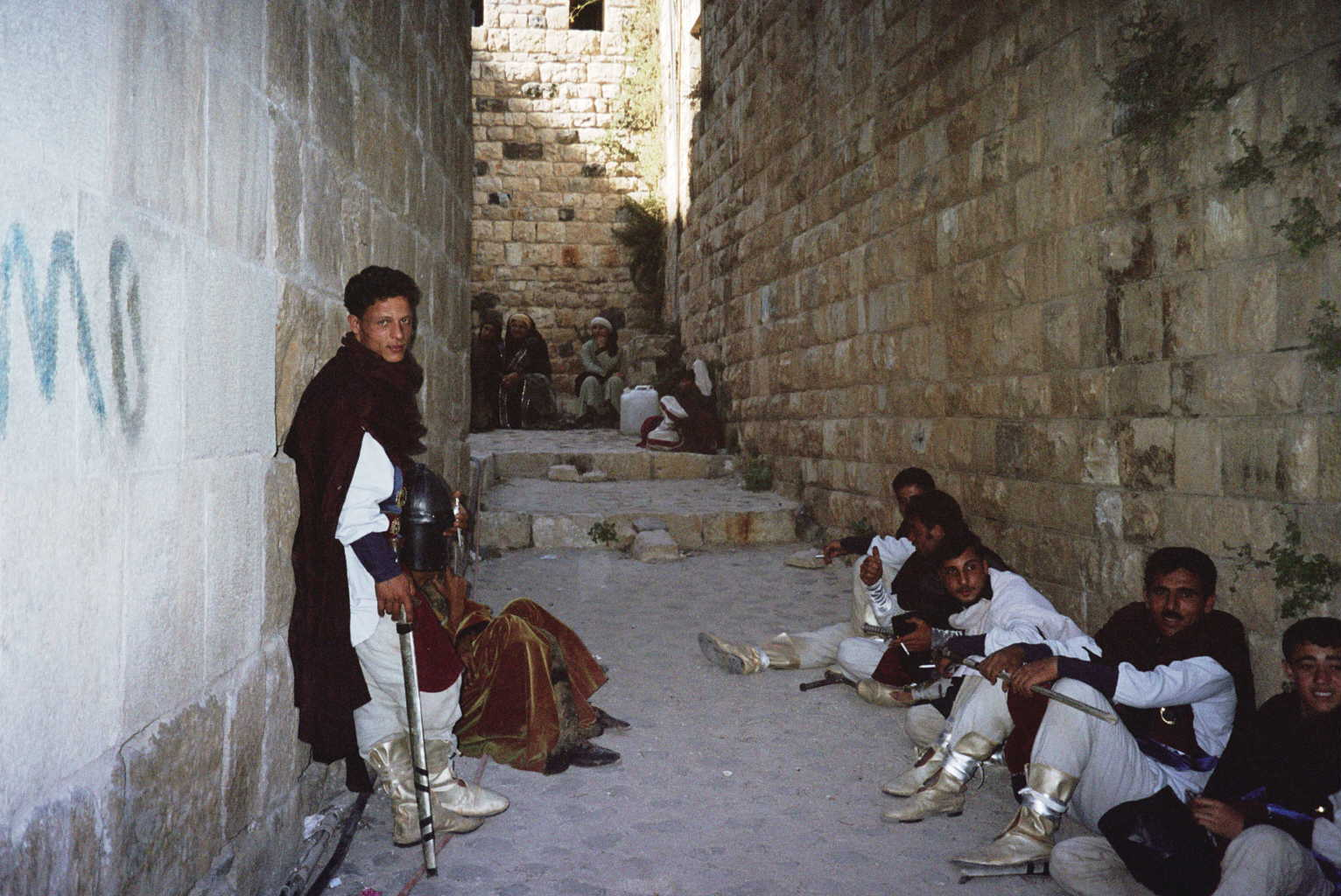
Background actors in the Krak des Chevaliers castle, Syria

Casting criteria for background actors depend on the production. It is not entirely true that background cast members require little or no acting experience, as any type of unrealistic portrayal must include some form of imagination and acting. Punctuality, reliability and the ability to take direction also figure prominently for these cast members. Background actors are generally selected on short notice, after all other preparations for the shoot have been finalized.

Several casting agencies specialize only in background work, while in the UK the directory Contacts published annually by Spotlight lists all accredited agencies and productions. Some agencies charge a registration fee, and some (mostly commercial background casting) will take between 10% and 15% commission from any booked work. Artists may be required to provide a basic one-page A4 sized CV/resume, that states basic personal details and dimensions, any significant skills (e.g. stage combat), and includes two 8×10-inch photographs on the rear: one head shot; one full body shot.

When hiring background actors, casting directors generally seek those with a specific "look", such as "high school students" or "affluent senior citizens", consistent with the context of the film. Casting directors may also look for background actors with a special skill for the scene, such as rollerblading, bike riding, skiing or dancing. A background actor is often expected to bring his or her own wardrobe to the set, although there are also "fittings" for a specific scene or period. A casting director may favor the one who already has the required costume or prop, such as a police uniform, or a musical instrument. On other occasions, where a costume has already been prepared (for example, to fit another actor who is now unavailable), a background actor may be selected as a "costume double" simply because they are the right size to fit it. On smaller productions or student films, background actors may be hired en masse with little formality.

The length of a background actor's employment on a production largely depends on the needs of the director and the scenes being filmed. Some background actors are needed on the set only for a day or two and are paid on a daily basis, while others may remain with the film for an extended period. For instance, on James Cameron's film Titanic, a group of 150 "core background actors" was hired to play the ship's passengers, and employed throughout the filming.

== Salary and working conditions ==
=== United Kingdom ===
In the United Kingdom, the distinction between an actor and an extra is defined by agreements between the actors' trade unions Broadcasting Entertainment Cinematograph and Theatre Union (BECTU) and Equity, and the various commercial trade and production bodies. These state that once a performer says 13 or more words in any scene, they must become a contracted actor in that production. Minimum pay rates are defined by UK Government minimum wage regulations, and both BECTU and Equity have agreed rates with each body. However, even on non-union productions, an extra's pay is an agreed day-rate for ten hours of production time. Actors who are recognisable or "featured" in a commercial under agreement with BECTU/Equity are paid on-going royalties. Hence on many advertisements, which are often shown multiple times and distributed internationally, while the extra is paid a contracted day-rate, the largest payment is from ongoing royalties. Due to the resultant complex calculations from multiple international showings, performers are often bought-out of their advertisement royalties with a one-off payment called a "buyout". Notable British extras of the modern era include Jill Goldston.

=== United States ===
Since 2012, in the US, most major film and television productions fall under the jurisdiction of the SAG-AFTRA union; previously, before SAG-AFTRA was AFL–CIO's affiliate, the two unions were separately named as Screen Actors Guild (SAG) and American Federation of Television and Radio Artists (AFTRA).

SAG-AFTRA signatory AMPTP producers are allowed to hire non-union background actors after a certain number of SAG performers have been cast; non-union background actors are usually paid the minimum wage. On productions outside of union jurisdiction, payment for background actors is at the discretion of the producers, and ranges from union-scale rates to "copy and credit" (i.e., no pay). Those producers who do not pay their actors may be in violation of state and federal laws about minimum wage for a job.

From 1946 until 1992, background actors (in film and television) were largely represented by the Screen Extras Guild. The Screen Extras Guild was dissolved in 1992 (legally dissolved in 1994) and its portrayal was transferred back to SAG as "West Coast extras".

During the Studio Era, many former silent-film stars worked during the sound era as minor actors or extras, including King Baggot, Maurice Costello, Florence Lawrence, Flora Finch and May McAvoy. Notable extras of the modern era include Jesse Heiman.

== Cultural references ==
Charles Chaplin tackled the subject of film extra work in three of his early short comedies: The Masquerader (1914), His New Job (1915), and Behind the Screen (1916).

The 1922 novel Merton of the Movies by Harry Leon Wilson depicts the tribulations of a male extra.

The silent film The Extra Girl (1923) portrays a small-town girl who comes to Hollywood and becomes a background actor in her attempt to achieve stardom. Souls for Sale (also 1923) depicts a young woman's career trajectory from extra to leading lady, though her progress is more haphazard.

The novels Extra-Girl by Stella G.S. Perry (1929) and I Should Have Stayed Home by Horace McCoy (1938) depict the working lives of Hollywood extras during the Great Depression.

The feature film Movie Crazy depicts a would-be actor (Harold Lloyd) working as an extra.

The quasi-documentary Hollywood Extra Girl, directed by Herbert Moulton, depicts the experience of a young female extra working on The Crusades (1935).

In his novel Infinite Jest (1996), David Foster Wallace refers to silent extras in sitcoms as "figurants", commenting that the need to include them is a concession to reality, even while their complete silence is unrealistic.

The British television sitcom Extras (2005–07) follows the exploits of two professional background actors, Andy and Maggie. They spend most of their time on set looking for a speaking role and a boyfriend, respectively.

In the Hindi black comedy film Mithya (2008), the protagonist is a background actor whose facial similarity to an underworld crime boss lands him in trouble.

The Filipino comedy-drama film Ekstra (The Bit Player) (2013) centers around the life of a divorcee named Loida Malabanan, whose odd job as a bit player for various acting roles enabled her to send her daughter to college. The movie is a social commentary on the exploitation and mistreatment of the marginalized sector in the television production industry in the Philippines.

The Chinese-Hong Kong film I Am Somebody (2015) is about extras working at the Hengdian World Studios.

== See also ==
- Background dancer
- Bit part
- Cameo appearance
- Central Casting
- Character actor
- Supporting actor
- Under-five
