= Bit part =

Small acting role

In acting, a bit part is a role in which there is direct interaction with the principal actors and no more than five lines of dialogue, often referred to as a five-or-less or under-five in the United States, or under sixes in British television, or a walk-on part with no dialogue.

A bit part is a credited higher billing than that of an extra and lower than that of a supporting actor. An actor who regularly performs in bit roles, either as a hobby or to earn a living, is referred to as a bit player, which is also a term to describe an aspiring actor who has not yet broken into supporting or leading roles.

Unlike extras, who do not typically interact with principals, actors in bit parts are sometimes listed in the credits. An exception to this practice is the cameo appearance, wherein a well-known actor or other celebrity appears in a bit part; it is common for such appearances to be uncredited.

In MGM's 1951 screen version of the musical Show Boat, the role of the cook Queenie (Frances E. Williams) was reduced from a significant supporting role in the stage version to a bit part in the film. Williams, whose appearance was not intended as a cameo, was not listed at all in the credits. On the other hand, William Warfield, whose role as Joe, Queenie's husband, was also drastically shortened in the film from the stage original, did receive screen credit because he sang "Ol' Man River".

Bit parts are often significant in the story line and sometimes pivotal, as in Jack Albertson's role as a postal worker in the 1947 feature film Miracle on 34th Street. Some characters with bit parts attract significant attention. Konstantin Stanislavski remarked that "there are no small parts, only small actors".

Dabbs Greer, a bit actor, once said: "Every character actor, in their own little sphere, is the lead".

== See also ==
- "Ready When You Are, Mr. McGill", a television episode about a bit actor
