= Alice Baker (set decorator) =

American set decorator

- Occupation: Set decorator
- Years active: 1987-present

Alice Baker is a set decorator best known for her work on the film 12 Years a Slave. With production designer Adam Stockhausen, Baker was nominated for an Academy Award for Best Production Design for her work on the period drama.

== Career ==
=== 12 Years a Slave ===
Baker served as set decorator on the film 12 Years a Slave, Steve McQueen's 2013 adaptation of Solomon Northup's 1853 memoir. As the historical drama was shot in New Orleans, but took place in Saratoga Springs, New York and on a ship as well as in Louisiana, Baker and Stockhausen used stereoscopic images and other historical documents to guide their development of sets that resembled the Northeast and steamships in the 1830s, in addition to using Louisiana plantations with some original buildings still in place. Faced with a limited budget as well as recently released films dealing with the same historical era that had just used many of the available sets (for example, Django Unchained and Abraham Lincoln: Vampire Hunter), Baker and Stockenhausen were challenged to develop an aesthetic authentic to the period, but visually distinct from the other films. They collected original items from antique shops, museums, and personal homes, in Mississippi and Louisiana, to decorate the sets.

In addition to the Academy Award nomination, Baker and Stockhausen were also nominated for a BAFTA Award for Best Production Design, a Critics' Choice Movie Award Best Art Direction, and the Art Directors Guild Award for Excellence in Production Design for a Period Film, among other awards.

=== I Saw the Light ===
Baker also served as set decorator on the 2015 Hank Williams biopic, I Saw the Light, starring Tom Hiddleston. Shot in Shreveport, Louisiana, Baker worked with production designer Merideth Boswell and another limited budget that nevertheless used 62 different locations to recreate the environment of Williams's life and career.
