= Satellite Award for Best Supporting Actor – Television Series =

Retired annual television award

The Satellite Award for Best Actor in a Supporting Role in a Series – Drama and Musical/Comedy were two awards given in 2003 and 2004.

== Winners and nominees ==
=== 2000s ===
Television Series – Drama

2003: Victor Garber – Alias

- Dennis Haysbert – 24
- Anthony Heald – Boston Public
- James Marsters – Buffy the Vampire Slayer
- Ron Rifkin – Alias

2004: Neal McDonough – Boomtown

- Andy Hallett – Angel
- Hill Harper – The Handler
- Anthony Heald – Boston Public
- Michael Rosenbaum – Smallville
- Gregory Smith – Everwood

Television Series – Musical or Comedy

2003: Eric Roberts – Less Than Perfect

- Sean Hayes – Will & Grace
- Peter MacNicol – Ally McBeal
- Chris Noth – Sex and the City
- David Hyde Pierce – Frasier

2004: Jeffrey Tambor – Arrested Development

- David Cross – Arrested Development
- David Alan Grier – Life with Bonnie
- Sean Hayes – Will & Grace
- Matt LeBlanc – Friends
- David Hyde Pierce – Frasier
