= Empire Award for Best Supporting Actor =

Former annual British film award

- Awarded for: Best performance by an actor in a supporting role
- Country: United Kingdom
- Presented by: Empire magazine
- First award: 2014
- Final award: 2014
- Currently held by: Michael Fassbender - 12 Years a Slave (2014)

The Empire Award for Best Supporting Actor is an Empire Award presented annually by the British film magazine Empire to honor an actor who has delivered an outstanding performance in a supporting role while working within the film industry. The Empire Award for Best Supporting Actor is one of two ongoing awards which were first introduced at the 19th Empire Awards ceremony in 2014 (along with Best Supporting Actress) with Michael Fassbender receiving the award for his role in 12 Years a Slave. Winners are voted by the readers of Empire magazine.

== Winners and nominees ==
In the list below, winners are listed first in boldface, followed by the other nominees. The number of the ceremony (1st, 2nd, etc.) appears in parentheses after the awards year, linked to the article (if any) on that ceremony.

=== 2010s ===
Year	Actor	Film	Ref.
**2014** **(19th)**	**Michael Fassbender**	**12 Years a Slave**	
**2014** **(19th)**	Daniel Brühl	Rush	
**2014** **(19th)**	Richard Armitage	The Hobbit: The Desolation of Smaug	
**2014** **(19th)**	Sam Claflin	The Hunger Games: Catching Fire	
**2014** **(19th)**	Tom Hiddleston	Thor: The Dark World	
