= Empire Award for Best Supporting Actress =

Former annual British film award

- Awarded for: Best performance by an actress in a supporting role
- Country: United Kingdom
- Presented by: Empire magazine
- First award: 2014
- Final award: 2014
- Currently held by: Sally Hawkins - Blue Jasmine (2014)

The Empire Award for Best Supporting Actress is an Empire Award presented annually by the British film magazine Empire to honor an actress who has delivered an outstanding performance in a supporting role while working within the film industry. The Empire Award for Best Supporting Actress is one of two ongoing awards first introduced at the 19th Empire Awards ceremony in 2014 (along with Best Supporting Actor) with Sally Hawkins receiving the award for her role in Blue Jasmine. Winners are voted upon by the readers of Empire magazine.

== Winners and nominees ==
Winners are listed first in boldface, followed by the other nominees. The number of the ceremony (1st, 2nd, etc.) appears in parentheses after the awards year, linked to the article (if any) on that ceremony.

=== 2010s ===
Year	Actor	Film	Ref.
**2014** **(19th)**	**Sally Hawkins**	**Blue Jasmine**	
**2014** **(19th)**	Evangeline Lilly	The Hobbit: The Desolation of Smaug	
**2014** **(19th)**	Jennifer Lawrence	American Hustle	
**2014** **(19th)**	Lupita Nyong'o	12 Years a Slave	
**2014** **(19th)**	Mia Wasikowska	Stoker	
