= Supporting actor =

Actor who performs a less-important role than that of the leading actor

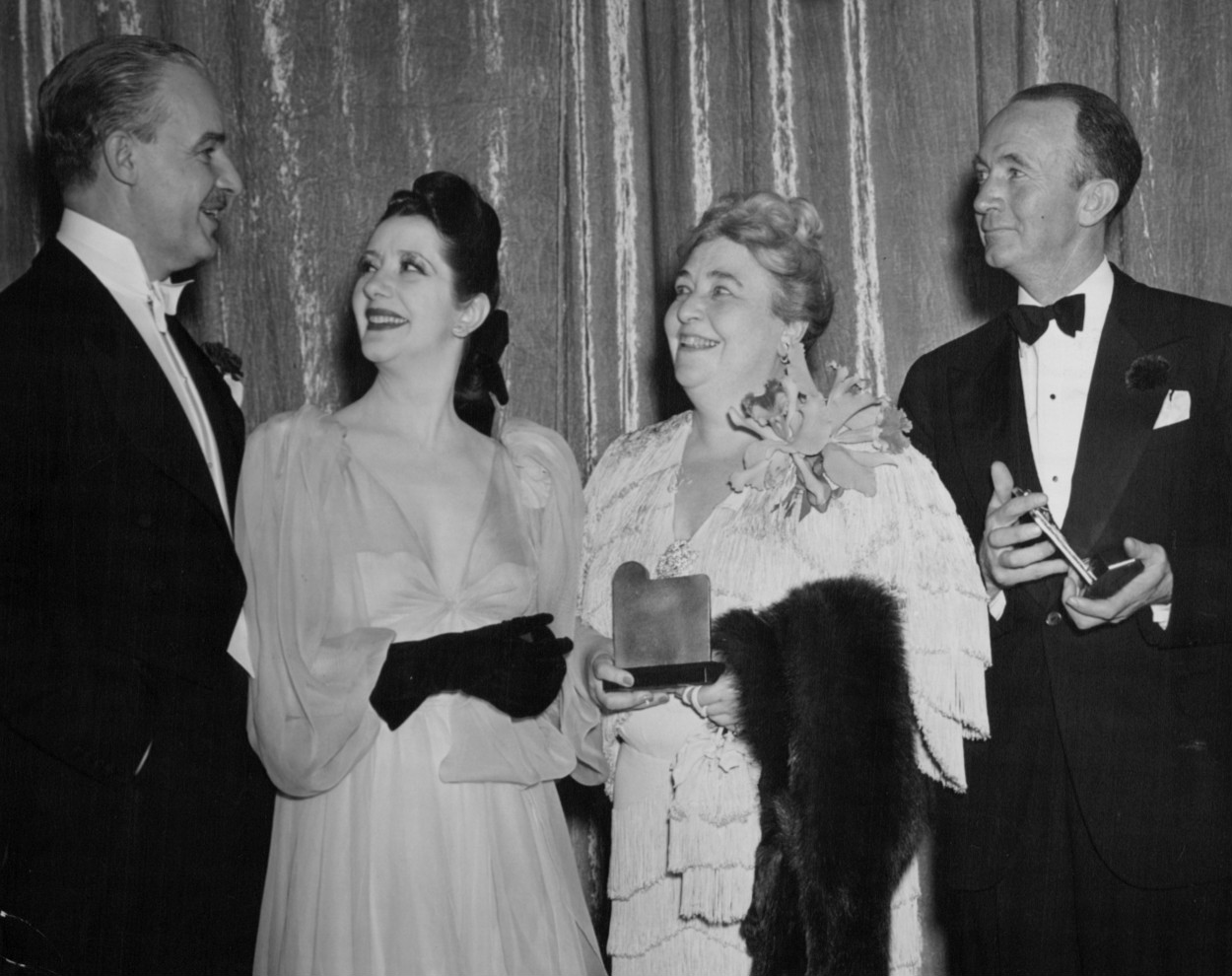
Alfred Lunt and Lynn Fontanne congratulating Jane Darwell and Walter Brennan for their Academy Award wins of Best Supporting Actress and Actor for the year 1940.

A supporting actor or supporting actress is an actor who performs a role in a play or film below that of the leading actor(s), and above that of a bit part. In recognition of the important nature of this work, the theater and film industries give separate awards to the best supporting actors and actresses.

These range from minor roles to principal players and are often pivotal or vital to the story as in a best friend, love interest, sidekick (such as Robin in the Batman series), or antagonist (such as the villain). They are sometimes but not necessarily character roles. In earlier times, these could often be ethnic stereotypes.

In television, the term day player is used to refer to most performers with supporting speaking roles hired daily without long-term contracts.

In Academy Awards, an annual award is given for the Best Performance by an actor/ actress in a supporting role. There is currently no specific criteria for the difference between nominations for supporting or lead actor/actress roles, so long as the actor's dialogue has not been dubbed. Determination of supporting and lead roles are determined by the members of the academy. Critics have pointed out that the leading/supporting roles have "no set rules, no general rational, just vibes" that may stem from racial, social, or gender identity bias.

== See also ==
- List of awards for supporting actor
- Academy Award for Best Supporting Actor (Oscar)
- BAFTA Award for Best Actor in a Supporting Role
- Golden Raspberry Award for Worst Supporting Actor (Razzie)
- Extra (acting)
- Supernumerary actor
- Under-five
