= List of awards for supporting actor =

Best Supporting Actor or Actress are accolades given by a group of film, television and stage professionals in recognition of the work of supporting actors. Most awards for supporting actors are gender-specific.

== Film ==
=== Male ===
- Academy Award for Best Supporting Actor
- AACTA Award for Best Actor in a Supporting Role
- AACTA International Award for Best Supporting Actor
- AVN Award for Best Supporting Actor
- BAFTA Award for Best Actor in a Supporting Role
- Black Reel Award: Best Supporting Actor
- Boston Society of Film Critics Award for Best Supporting Actor
- Broadcast Film Critics Association Award for Best Supporting Actor
- Canadian Screen Award for Best Supporting Actor
- César Award for Best Supporting Actor
- Chicago Film Critics Association Award for Best Supporting Actor
- Citra Award for Best Supporting Actor
- Dallas-Fort Worth Film Critics Association Award for Best Supporting Actor
- David di Donatello for Best Supporting Actor
- Empire Award for Best Supporting Actor
- Filmfare Award for Best Supporting Actor -Hindi
- Filmfare Award for Best Supporting Actor – Telugu
- Florida Film Critics Circle Award for Best Supporting Actor
- Genie Award for Best Performance by an Actor in a Supporting Role
- Golden Calf Award for Best Supporting Actor
- Golden Globe Award for Best Supporting Actor – Motion Picture
- Golden Raspberry Award for Worst Supporting Actor
- Goya Award for Best Supporting Actor
- Hong Kong Film Award for Best Supporting Actor
- Hundred Flowers Award for Best Supporting Actor
- Independent Spirit Award for Best Supporting Male
- Los Angeles Film Critics Association Award for Best Supporting Actor
- NAACP Image Award for Outstanding Supporting Actor in a Motion Picture
- National Board of Review Award for Best Supporting Actor
- National Film Award for Best Supporting Actor
- National Society of Film Critics Award for Best Supporting Actor
- New York Film Critics Circle Award for Best Supporting Actor
- Online Film Critics Society Award for Best Supporting Actor
- Polish Academy Award for Best Supporting Actor
- Prix Iris for Best Supporting Actor
- San Diego Film Critics Society Award for Best Supporting Actor
- San Francisco Film Critics Circle Award for Best Supporting Actor
- Satellite Award for Best Supporting Actor – Motion Picture
- Saturn Award for Best Supporting Actor
- Screen Actors Guild Award for Outstanding Performance by a Male Actor in a Supporting Role
- SIIMA Award for Best Supporting Actor – Telugu
- St. Louis Gateway Film Critics Association Award for Best Supporting Actor
- Toronto Film Critics Association Award for Best Supporting Actor
- Vancouver Film Critics Circle Award for Best Supporting Actor
- Washington D.C. Area Film Critics Association Award for Best Supporting Actor
- Zee Cine Award for Best Actor in a Supporting Role – Male

=== Female ===
- Academy Award for Best Supporting Actress
- AACTA Award for Best Actress in a Supporting Role
- AACTA International Award for Best Supporting Actress
- BAFTA Award for Best Actress in a Supporting Role
- Black Reel Award: Best Supporting Actress
- Boston Society of Film Critics Award for Best Supporting Actress
- Broadcast Film Critics Association Award for Best Supporting Actress
- Canadian Screen Award for Best Supporting Actress
- César Award for Best Supporting Actress
- Citra Award for Best Supporting Actress
- Chicago Film Critics Association Award for Best Supporting Actress
- Dallas-Fort Worth Film Critics Association Award for Best Supporting Actress
- David di Donatello for Best Supporting Actress
- Empire Award for Best Supporting Actress
- Filmfare Award for Best Supporting Actress - Hindi
- Filmfare Award for Best Supporting Actress – Telugu
- Florida Film Critics Circle Award for Best Supporting Actress
- Genie Award for Best Performance by an Actress in a Supporting Role
- Golden Calf Award for Best Supporting Actress
- Golden Globe Award for Best Supporting Actress – Motion Picture
- Golden Horse Award for Best Supporting Actress
- Golden Raspberry Award for Worst Supporting Actress
- Goya Award for Best Supporting Actress
- Hong Kong Film Award for Best Supporting Actress
- Hundred Flowers Award for Best Supporting Actress
- Independent Spirit Award for Best Supporting Female
- Los Angeles Film Critics Association Award for Best Supporting Actress
- NAACP Image Award for Outstanding Supporting Actress in a Motion Picture
- National Board of Review Award for Best Supporting Actress
- National Film Award for Best Supporting Actress
- National Society of Film Critics Award for Best Supporting Actress
- New York Film Critics Circle Award for Best Supporting Actress
- Online Film Critics Society Award for Best Supporting Actress
- Polish Academy Award for Best Supporting Actress
- Prix Iris for Best Supporting Actress
- San Diego Film Critics Society Award for Best Supporting Actress
- San Francisco Film Critics Circle Award for Best Supporting Actress
- Satellite Award for Best Supporting Actress – Motion Picture
- Saturn Award for Best Supporting Actress
- Screen Actors Guild Award for Outstanding Performance by a Female Actor in a Supporting Role
- SIIMA Award for Best Supporting Actress – Telugu
- St. Louis Gateway Film Critics Association Award for Best Supporting Actress
- Toronto Film Critics Association Award for Best Supporting Actress
- Vancouver Film Critics Circle Award for Best Supporting Actress
- Washington D.C. Area Film Critics Association Award for Best Supporting Actress
- Zee Cine Award for Best Actor in a Supporting Role – Female

== Television ==
=== Male ===
- AACTA Award for Best Guest or Supporting Actor in a Television Drama
- British Academy Television Award for Best Supporting Actor
- Canadian Screen Award for Best Supporting Actor in a Comedy Series
- Canadian Screen Award for Best Supporting Actor in a Drama Program or Series
- Daytime Emmy Award for Outstanding Supporting Actor in a Drama Series
- Primetime Emmy Award for Outstanding Supporting Actor in a Comedy Series
- Primetime Emmy Award for Outstanding Supporting Actor in a Miniseries or a Movie
- Primetime Emmy Award for Outstanding Supporting Actor in a Drama Series
- Golden Globe Award for Best Supporting Actor – Series, Miniseries or Television Film
- Satellite Award for Best Supporting Actor – Series, Miniseries or Television Film
- Satellite Award for Best Supporting Actor – Television Series
- Saturn Award for Best Supporting Actor on Television
- TVB Anniversary Award for Best Supporting Actor

=== Female ===
- AACTA Award for Best Guest or Supporting Actress in a Television Drama
- Canadian Screen Award for Best Supporting Actress in a Comedy Series
- Canadian Screen Award for Best Supporting Actress in a Drama Program or Series
- Daytime Emmy Award for Outstanding Supporting Actress in a Drama Series
- Primetime Emmy Award for Outstanding Supporting Actress in a Comedy Series
- Primetime Emmy Award for Outstanding Supporting Actress in a Drama Series
- Primetime Emmy Award for Outstanding Supporting Actress in a Miniseries or a Movie
- Golden Globe Award for Best Supporting Actress – Series, Miniseries or Television Film
- Satellite Award for Best Supporting Actress – Series, Miniseries or Television Film
- Satellite Award for Best Supporting Actress – Television Series
- Saturn Award for Best Supporting Actress on Television
- TVB Anniversary Award for Best Supporting Actress

== Theatre ==
=== Male ===
- Tony Award for Best Featured Actor in a Play
- Tony Award for Best Featured Actor in a Musical
- Laurence Olivier Award for Best Actor in a Supporting Role
- Laurence Olivier Award for Best Actor in a Musical

=== Female ===
- Tony Award for Best Featured Actress in a Play
- Tony Award for Best Featured Actress in a Musical
- Laurence Olivier Award for Best Actress in a Supporting Role
- Laurence Olivier Award for Best Actress in a Supporting Role in a Musical

== See also ==
- Lists of awards
- List of television awards
- Lists of acting awards
