= 1994 in science fiction =

The year 1994 was marked, in science fiction, by the following:

== Events ==
- The 52nd annual Worldcon, ConAdian, is held in Winnipeg, Canada

== Births and deaths ==
=== Deaths ===
- Robert Bloch
- Raymond Z Gallun
- Jack Kirby

== Literary releases ==
=== Novels ===
- Gun, with Occasional Music, by Jonathan Lethem
- Heavy Weather, by Bruce Sterling

=== Comics ===
- The Invisibles, created by Grant Morrison, debuts
- Scud: The Disposable Assassin #1, by Rob Schrab
- THB #1, by Paul Pope

== Movies ==
- Stargate, dir. by Roland Emmerich
- Timecop, dir. by Peter Hyams

== Television ==
- ReBoot

== Video games ==
- Beneath a Steel Sky
- Earthworm Jim
- Marathon
- Policenauts

== Awards ==
=== Hugos ===
- Best novel: Green Mars, by Kim Stanley Robinson
- Best novella: Down in the Bottomlands, by Harry Turtledove
- Best novelette: "Georgia on My Mind", by Charles Sheffield
- Best short story: "Death on the Nile", by Connie Willis
- Best related work: The Encyclopedia of Science Fiction, by Peter Nicholls and John Clute
- Best dramatic presentation: Jurassic Park, dir. by Steven Spielberg; screenplay by Michael Crichton and David Koepp; based on the novel by Michael Crichton
- Best professional editor: Kristine Kathryn Rusch
- Best professional artist: Bob Eggleton
- Best original art work: Space Fantasy commemorative stamp booklet by Stephen Hickman
- Best Semiprozine: Science Fiction Chronicle, ed. by Andrew I. Porter
- Best fanzine: Mimosa, ed. by Dick Lynch and Nicki Lynch
- Best fan writer: Dave Langford
- Best fan artist: Brad W. Foster

=== Nebulas ===
- Best novel: Moving Mars, by Greg Bear
- Best novella: Seven Views of Olduvai Gorge, by Mike Resnick
- Best novelette: "The Martian Child", by David Gerrold
- Best short story: "A Defense of the Social Contracts", by Martha Soukup

=== Other awards ===
- BSFA Award for Best Novel: Feersum Endjinn, by Iain M. Banks
- Locus Award for Best Science Fiction Novel: Green Mars, by Kim Stanley Robinson
- Saturn Award for Best Science Fiction Film: Stargate
