= Dangler (narrative) =

Type of plot device

Dangler is a narrative term meaning a plotline that remains unresolved or is metaphorically left to "dangle" or "hang": a type of major plothole. A dangler, or dangling plotline, is an unanticipated (and thus, usually, unintended) feature in fiction where a plotline is forgotten, phased out, or eventually dropped, thus a resolution is never achieved. The reason may vary: forgetfulness or lack of attention on the part of the creator, the firing or death of the creator, the inability of the creator to resolve details while under a deadline, the corporate termination of the creative project, etc. Although dangling plotlines can occur in all forms of media, they typically appear in comic books, movies, and book sequels, where the original writer or creative team is frequently replaced.

== Reasons for danglers ==
Typically, a writer will pepper the main story with smaller back-stories. It then becomes evident to the reader that these smaller back-stories have the potential to build up into a bigger story and reach a conclusion of some sort.

Editorial mandate can also force a writer to drop a building plotline due to fan backlash or an editor's lack of interest to pursue such a plot.

== Examples of danglers ==
In television, when a creative team fears that their show may not be picked up for another season, they will end the season finale with a cliffhanger in order to conjure a fan outcry and interest to continue the series. When the series is not picked up for another season, the cliffhanger creates a dangling plotline. Usually the original writer, fan of the series, or the company who produced the series, will look to another form of media to continue the story. Twin Peaks was able to resolve some dangling plotlines due to the release of the theatrical film. Buffy the Vampire Slayer got its own comic book series appropriately named Buffy the Vampire Slayer Season Eight, which was written by series creator Joss Whedon. In an extremely rare occasion, Futurama was continued six years later through direct-to-DVD films, which eventually led to the resurrection of the series in its original television format.

In comic books, it is a common practice for writers to resolve their own dangling plotlines in other comic books within the shared universe. A good example is Frank Tieri, who started a Weapon X story in Wolverine, who then later became the writer of his own Weapon X series and as the series ended abruptly, was forced to continue some of his side-stories in a miniseries called Weapon X: Days of Future Now. One lingering plotline left a character in limbo from the Weapon X series until Frank Tieri took the reins of New Excalibur, where he proceeded to close this character's storyline, five years later. Chris Claremont and Warren Ellis are also known for continuing their own stories throughout other books they write for. In a similar fashion, Mark Millar has continued the story of an ever-dangling character, Clyde Wyncham, all throughout his runs on Marvel 1985, Kick-Ass, Fantastic Four and Old Man Logan.

Because of the unsatisfying nature of having a plotline dangle, fans sometimes take matters into their own hands. One famous example of this, the numerous directors and writers in the Halloween series each had different directions for their story of Michael Myers. This left many plot holes and dangling storylines after each movie. Seemingly unconnected, the movies would end with a cliffhanger and continue with absolutely no mention of the previous movie's occurrences. To remedy this mess of continuity, Chaos Comics published a comic book series to bridge the gaps between all the movies into one continuous canon.

== See also ==
- Back to back film production
- Cliffhanger
- Plot hole
- Subplot
- Zeigarnik effect
