= Steve Horton =

American cartoonist

Steve Horton (born 1977) is a New York Times bestselling comic book writer and graphic novelist with credits at Image Comics, IDW, Dark Horse Comics, and Insight Comics.

Horton graduated from Purdue University with a BA in professional writing in 2002. He first wrote for Strongarm #1 for Image (2007). Since then he has written for various comics, including Amala's Blade: Spirits of Naamaron with Michael Dialynas (2013) and Satellite Falling with Stephen Thompson (2018).

In 2020 Horton authored Bowie: Stardust, Rayguns, and Moonage Daydreams with Michael Allred (illustrator) and Laura Allred (colorist). The graphic novel was widely received with praise and in 2021 won two Eisner Awards.

== Media Appearances ==
In 2013 Horton was interviewed about Amala's Blade by Comicosity.

In 2014 Horton was interviewed about Amala's Blade by Bloody Disgusting.

In 2016 Horton was interviewed about Satellite Falling by Westfield Comics Blog.

In 2019 Horton was interviewed about Bowie: Stardust, Rayguns, and Moonage Daydreams by Comic Beat and by First Comics News.

In 2020 Horton was interviewed about Bowie: Stardust, Rayguns, and Moonage Daydreams on the Wit's End Podcast.
