= Jersey Gods =

Publication information
- Publisher: Image Comics
- Publication date: February 2009 – May 2010
- No. of issues: 12

Creative team
- Written by: Glen Brunswick
- Artist: Dan McDaid
- Colorist: Rachelle Rosenberg

Jersey Gods is a comic book published by Image Comics. It was written by Glen Brunswick, pencilled and inked by Dan McDaid, with colors by Rachelle Rosenberg. The covers were drawn by Mike Allred and coloured by Laura Allred. Alternative covers were also provided by Dan McDaid, Darwyn Cooke, Paul Pope and Whilce Porticio. A back-up strip, Tales from the Great War, was written by Mark Waid and drawn by Joe Infurnari. Prior to publication, teaser strips appeared in Popgun volume 2 and Invincible #55.

== Plot ==
The central story concerns the romantic relationship between Zoe, an ordinary resident of New Jersey, and Barock, a God from the fictional world of Neboron.

== Collected editions ==
- Volume 1: I'd Live and I'd Die for You ISBN 1607060639
- Volume 2: And This is Home ISBN 1607061171
- Volume 3: Thunder Road ISBN 1607062623
