= Turf (Image Comics) =

Comic book series

- Cover of Turf 1 (April 2010), art by Tommy Lee Edwards

Publication information
- Publisher: Image Comics
- Schedule: Monthly
- Format: Limited series
- Genre: Gothic science fiction
- Publication date: April 2010 – June 2011
- No. of issues: 5

Creative team
- Created by: Jonathan Ross; Tommy Lee Edwards
- Written by: Jonathan Ross
- Artist: Tommy Lee Edwards
- Letterer: John Workman
- Colorist: Tommy Lee Edwards
- Editor: John Barber

Collected editions
- Hardcover: ISBN 1-60706-400-6

Turf is a five-issue comic book limited series, written by Jonathan Ross, illustrated by Tommy Lee Edwards and published by American company Image Comics. It was later serialised in CLiNT, before being collected.

== Plot summary ==
The narrative is set in 1920s Prohibition-era New York and features period typical gangsters alongside vampires and aliens. Ross himself, describes the comic as "An intelligent popcorn movie. Lots of action, lots of setting, lots of cool ideas, but with an emotional heart to it".

== Reception ==
The first 20,000 copies of issue 1 sold out on pre-orders alone. In interview, Ross said that he intended the mini-series to run for five issues, eventually being released in a hardback collection and potentially a film adaptation, to be made by Matthew Vaughn.

== Film adaptation ==
In 2011, Benderspink has optioned a film adaptation of Turf.

== Collected editions ==
The series was collected into a single volume:

- Turf (180 pages, hardcover, Images Comics, August 2011, ISBN 1-60706-400-6, Titan Books, September 2011, ISBN 1-84856-895-9)

== Sources ==
- Turf at the Grand Comics Database
- Turf at the Comic Book DB (archived from the original)
