= 100% (comics) =

Comic book by Paul Pope

- Artwork for the wraparound cover of 100% #1 by Paul Pope.

Publication information
- Publisher: Vertigo
- Schedule: Monthly
- Format: Limited series
- Genre: Cyberpunk, romance
- Publication date: August 2002 – July 2003
- No. of issues: 5
- Main character(s): Kim; Strel; Daisy; Haitous; Eloy; John

Creative team
- Created by: Paul Pope
- Written by: Paul Pope
- Artist: Paul Pope
- Letterer: John Workman
- Colorist(s): Paul Pope; Lee Loughridge

100% is a black-and-white comic book with gray tones written and drawn by Paul Pope. It was published by American company DC Comics' Vertigo imprint in five issues between 2002 and 2003, then collected as a trade paperback in 2005.

The plot concerns six main characters in Manhattan, New York City in January 2038. Though the interweaving stories are romantic in nature, they are steeped in science fiction and cyberpunk environments.

== Themes and plot elements ==
=== Manga influence ===
Before making 100%, Pope was employed for about five years by Kodansha, Japan's leading manga publisher. In an interview, he described the experience as "the equivalent of a grad school education in 'how to tell stories the manga way'". One concept he derived from his employment was the company's insistence on the importance of characters' internal conflict above all else. In this sense, Pope cites this book in particular as his attempt at making an "American Manga".

=== Form ===
In the index of the trade paperback edition, Pope explains:

I first conceived of what eventually would become 100% as a series of loosely connected short stories, each maybe 20 to 50 pages in length. These would secretly be old-fashioned romance comics of the boy-meets-girl-boy-loses-girl type, disguised as low-voltage science fiction stories.

Pope took this idea to Vertigo, who asked him make it into one story with a beginning, middle and end. He took elements he already had and wove them together into the final treatment, to be developed into the comic book.

=== Back story ===
Much of 100%'s backstory has been left ambiguous, but certain details emerge. There has been a war or wars, as main characters make reference to bombing near Istanbul and an Indian Ocean military landing. The United Nations and United States have combined (as the UN/USA), and Che Guevara's face is on the 100 dollar bill (actually marked as United Nations currency). The streets are patrolled by USPD officers in ubiquitous lurking patrol vehicles.

=== Science fiction elements ===
Pope invents and creatively christens several technological and cultural elements for the dystopian future in which 100% takes place:

- Gastro clubs are a few steps beyond a strip club. Using MRI-Tek, monitors record and project 3D images of dancers' internal organs for a paying audience. This is accompanied by elaborate stage personae, makeup, and even accessories like the Firecoat worn by Daisy in one scene, which simulates lighting her on fire as she dances. The gastro club in the book is called the Cathouse, though the supplemental text in the book refer to it as the Catshack.
- Another application of MRI-Tek is in Gastro-Fight, a sport most resembling boxing, which uses the same invasive technology on its fighters.
- Communications technology has advanced: Telephony and video communication seem to have been consolidated to threads, which can patch between mobile devices or any of the many-sized video screens present, which may also serve as news or video feeds (V-Jak). One video screen in the comic also responds to voice activation; this is reminiscent of a scene in the film Blade Runner, which shares several other themes and visual elements with 100%.
- Drugs have become progressively more accepted, and GRAZ is America's first brand of legal marijuana cigarette.
- The police pilot flying cars just like in Blade Runner.
- Daisy and John have a date in a four-dee, a virtual reality room, programmable at the push of a button to simulate any surrounding.
- Light Pollution Indicators, or Flatshade, is technology which acts as smart sunglasses. An adhesive dot is placed beneath each eye, and they minimize the effects of rapid changes in light, e.g. strobe lights or halogen flashes. Daisy wears these throughout the book, and the cover of the trade paperback depict her putting on LPI's in a mirror.

== Characters ==
- Kim tends bar at the gastro club. She fears for her personal safety after a girl is murdered behind the club, and buys a gun.
- Strel is the dance manager of the club. She is friends with Kim, and very protective and motherly. She is, in fact, a mother.
- Daisy is a new stripper at the gastro club. She is something of a loner, and is uncomfortable staying in one place too long. Her stage persona is Dollar Bill.
- Haitous, a monstrous gastro fighter and former Navy man who fought in the war, is revealed to be Strel's estranged husband, returning after a year of travelling the fight circuit to make amends for past differences.
- Strel's cousin Eloy is a struggling artist, and Strel introduces him to Kim, who is taken by his passion for his art. He is working on a project in the grain silo where he lives: he wants to collect 100 tea kettles and tune them all to whistle exactly the same note, creating "one hundred percent sound". His nickname is Kettlehead.
- John works as a bus boy below the club, and develops a relationship with Daisy that could be described as either a crush or an obsession.

== Collected editions ==
Title	Material collected	Format	Publication date	ISBN	Publisher
100%	100% #1–5	Trade paperback	March 16, 2005	978-1401203498	Vertigo
100%	100% #1–5	Hardcover	April 15, 2009	978-1401221331	Vertigo
100%	100% #1–5	Trade paperback	April 21, 2010	978-1401224615	Vertigo
100%	100% #1–5	Trade paperback	March 4, 2020	978-1534313613	Image Comics
