= Ralph Niese =

German comic artist, graphic artist, and illustrator (1983–2020)

Ralph Niese (* March 14, 1983 in Leipzig; † November 23, 2020) was a German comic artist, graphic artist and illustrator.

== Life ==
Niese attended the Max Klinger School, a secondary school in the Leipzig district of Grünau, and then studied at the Academy of Fine Arts Leipzig. Through a contact at the booth belonging to the comic publisher Extrem Erfolgreich Enterprises (EEE), Niese was able to publish his first work Wolfmen in the magazine series Extrem Illustrated at the age of 16. According to Bela B, the former owner of EEE, he was the youngest artist whose contributions were published in the series, but who as a minor was not allowed to buy the issues himself. This was followed by other publications in German comic magazines aimed at an adult audience, such as Menschenblut and U-Comix. As an illustrator and colorist, he contributed to several issues of the Perry - Our Man in Space series by Alligator Farm between 2007 and 2010. Niese also published some comic books under the label Fistful Fumetti, many of them in small format stapled by hand. For example, he self-published his own series Poly Chronos and Mekano Turbo together with Alexis Ziritt.

From 2008 to 2009 Niese was involved as an illustrator on publications for the US publisher Image Comics. He not only worked as an inker for two issues of the Noble Causes series, but also designed the covers of the issues. During this time Niese also published pages in the sixth issue of Madman Atomic Comics magazine and in two issues of the comic anthology Popgun. For the series Space Riders by Alexis Ziritt and Fabian Rangel Jr. he contributed a variant cover for the first issue. As part of the Glyos System Comic Series between 2011 and 2016, Niese illustrated several webcomics based on the English texts by Matt Doughty, including the titles Reflex, Volkria and Chariots Keep.

The Leipzig comic artist is described by his colleagues as a creative and sociable free spirit who often cooperated with other authors and artists. He was also counted as an integral part of the alternative comics scene internationally. In addition to his work as a comic artist, Niese was also artistically active in other areas. At the end of 2014 he published the calendar The Young Time Traveller, which also contains exclusive comic pages. In 2018, he contributed designs for various stickers for the eleventh issue of Klebstoff Magazine. As a part-time member of the small toy manufacturer Goodleg Toys, Niese designed several small-scale synthetic resin figures, including his figure Robert Cop. For October Toys he made the minifigure Phantom Outhouse based on the design by Kyle Thye as part of the OMFG! Series 1.

Starting in 2017, Niese collaborated with German hip-hop artist Morlockk Dilemma on album covers, illustrated lyrical comic books and action figures.

Ralph Niese lived and worked as a freelance illustrator and comic artist in Leipzig.
