= Vandroid =

Vandroid may refer to:

- Vandroid (comic book), a comic book limited series
- Vandroid (soundtrack), a 2014 album, the soundtrack to the comic book
