= Bowie: Stardust, Rayguns, and Moonage Daydreams =

2020 graphic novel

Bowie: Stardust, Rayguns, and Moonage Daydreams is a 2020 graphic novel that follows David Bowie's life through his Ziggy Stardust years up to his The Thin White Duke period. It was authored by Steve Horton (writer) and Mike Allred (illustrator), with coloring by Laura Allred.

== Plot ==
Bowie: Stardust, Rayguns, and Moonage Daydreams chronicles the rise of Bowie's career from obscurity to fame, and the rise and fall of Ziggy Stardust, Bowie's historic alter-ego. It ends with the “death” of Ziggy - the alter-ego's exit from Bowie's life, after accompanying Bowie on his vertiginous rise to fame and the rocky ride at the top. When the Spiders from Mars finally implode and Bowie leaves London for a new nomadic life abroad, he must lay the Ziggy persona to rest for good: the end of Ziggy will leave the world changed, Bowie himself a little emptier inside, but a little saner, a little more restored to the mortal realm.

== Reception ==
In 2020 Bowie: Stardust, Rayguns and Moonage Daydreams was widely received with praise. It reached No. 15 on the New York Times' Graphic Books and Manga best sellers list for 2020. It was referenced by the Washington Post as one of the 20 graphic novels that defined 2020. It was nominated by Comics Bookcase as one of the best graphic novels of 2020. It was nominated as one of Library of Philadelphia's 20 great graphic novels and comics from 2020. It was nominated as one of The Oklahoman's best graphic novels of 2020. It was one of MakeUseOf's 20 best books to read in 2020. It was listed on Wired's ultimate gift guide for 2020. Bowie: Stardust, Rayguns, and Moonage Daydreams was also runner up in both Publishers Weekly's top graphic novels of 2020 and IGNs' best limited comic book series or graphic novels of 2020.

In 2021 Bowie: Stardust, Rayguns, and Moonage Daydreams won Eisner Awards for Best Colorist/Coloring (Laura Allred) and Penciller/Inker or Penciller/Inker Team (Michael Allred).
