= Dan McDaid =

British comic book writer and artist

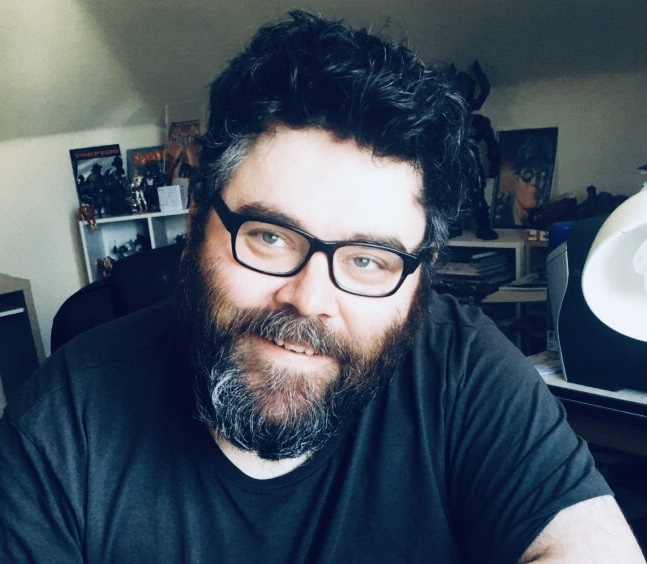
- McDaid at his art board
- Areas: Writer, Penciller, Inker, Colourist
- Notable works: The Crimson Hand, Judge Dredd: Mega-City Zero, Firefly, Dega

Dan McDaid (/məkˈdeɪd/) is a British comic book writer and artist.

== Career ==
McDaid made his debut in Doctor Who Magazine, after sending a sample strip to then editor Clayton Hickman. His debut work for DWM was as writer of The First, a story where the Doctor meets Ernest Shackleton. He took part in Comic Book Resources' Comic Book Idol 2007, reaching the final three.

He then teamed up with Glen Brunswick for a twelve-issue run on Jersey Gods for Image Comics.

While the television series Doctor Who was off-air, McDaid wrote the 10th Doctor's continuing adventures, published in DWM, then collected in The Crimson Hand. In these stories, the Doctor finds himself with a new companion, Majenta Pryce, whom McDaid had created for the story Hotel Historia. Since then he has worked for Panini Comics, IDW, Oni Press, DC Comics, Dark Horse, Boom! Studios and Blank Slate.

At the 2012 New York Comic Con it was announced that McDaid would be one of the artists on Dark Horse Comics' Catalyst Comix, with writer Joe Casey, released in 2013.

McDaid was the comic book artist on the multi-media project, Vandroid, along with Tommy Lee Edwards. The project includes a 5 issue comic, an album and film. In 2014 he illustrated a story written by Irvine Welsh which was published in IDP:2043, as part of the Edinburgh Book Festival. He worked with Welsh again in 2018, contributing pages of art to his novel Dead Men's Trousers.

== Personal life ==
McDaid is originally from Cornwall, but has lived in the north-east of Scotland since 2003.

== Bibliography ==
- Dega (writer and artist, 2021) Dr Ink Productions
- The Fearsome Doctor Fang (artist, issues 1–6, 2018) TKO Studios
- Dead Men's Trousers, written by Irvine Welsh (artist, 2018) Jonathan Cape

DC Comics

- Sea Dogs, written by Joe Hill (artist, 2019–2020)
- Doom Patrol (artist, issue 12, 2018)
- T.H.U.N.D.E.R. Agents (artist, issue 10, 2011)
- Superman 80-page Giant (artist, 2011)

IDW

- Judge Dredd: Mega-City Zero (artist, 2016)
- Doctor Who Annual 2011 (writer and artist)

Boom! Studios

- Dawn of the Planet of the Apes (artist, 2014–2015)
- Firefly, written by Greg Pak (artist, 2018–2020)

Dark Horse Comics

- Smoke/Ashes (artist, September, 2013)
- Catalyst Comix written by Joe Casey (artist, issues 1–9, 2013–2014)
- Vandroid (artist, 2014)

Doctor Who Magazine

- The First (writer, issues 386–389)
- Hotel Historia (writer, artist and colourist, issue 394)
- Thinktwice (writer, issues 400–402)
- The Stockbridge Child (writer, issues 403–405)
- Mortal Beloved (writer, issues 406–407)
- The Age of Ice (writer, issues 408–411)
- The Deep Hereafter (writer, issue 412)
- Onomatopoeia (writer, issue 413)
- Ghosts of the Northern Line (writer, issues 414–415)
- The Crimson Hand (writer, issues 416–420)
- The Screams of Death (artist, issues 430–431)
- Apotheosis (artist, issues 435–437)
- The Cornucopia Caper (artist, issues 448–450)

Panini Comics

- The Widow's Curse (writer, October 2009)ISBN 978-1846534294
- The Crimson Hand (writer and artist, May 2012) ISBN 978-1-84653-451-5
- The Child of Time (artist, October, 2012) ISBN 978-1846534607
- The Chains of Olympus (artist, September, 2013) ISBN 978 1846535581

Image Comics

- Jersey Gods (artist, issues 1–12, 2010)
- Lost Vegas (variant cover artist, issue 1, 2013)
- Lost Vegas (cover artist, ECCC exclusive, issue 1, 2013)
- Mind The Gap (artist, issues 9, 13–15, 2013)
- Sex (artist, issue 17, 2014)

- IDP: 2043, written by Irvine Welsh (artist, 2014) Freight Books
- Captain Victory and the Galactic Rangers (artist, 2016) Dynamite Entertainment
- Time Share (artist, 2017) Oni Press
- Nelson (writer and artist, November 2011) Blank Slate ISBN 978-1906653231
- Judge Dredd: "Fear City" (artist, 2026) Judge Dredd Megazine #491
