= Vandroid (comic book) =

- Cover of Vandroid 2 (March 2014), art by Tommy Lee Edwards

Publication information
- Publisher: Dark Horse Comics
- Schedule: Monthly
- Format: Limited series
- Genre: Science fiction
- Publication date: February – June 2014
- No. of issues: 5

Creative team
- Created by: Nick Demetris Nicola; Tommy Lee Edwards; Noah Smith; Dan McDaid
- Written by: Tommy Lee Edwards; Noah Smith
- Artist: Dan McDaid
- Letterer: John Workman
- Colorist: Melissa Edwards
- Editor(s): Jeff Mariotte; Daniel Chabon

Collected editions
- Paperback: ISBN 1-61655-495-9

Vandroid is a five-issue comic book limited series, written by Tommy Lee Edwards and Noah Smith, illustrated by Dan McDaid and published by Dark Horse Comics. There is an accompanying Vandroid soundtrack album by French electronic music label Ed Banger Records, a short film directed by Edwards and starring Chad Netherland as Vandroid, and an animated trailer made by London-based studio Golden Wolf.

== Plot summary ==
The backstory of the Vandroid comic book is that its creators are reviving a fictionally lost sci-fi movie from 1984. As for the story itself: Chuck Carducci, a genius engineer who had the world at his feet is now a washed up, broke mechanic. Chuck is contacted by an old friend from his college days with an offer to work on a new project involving artificial intelligence. Combining stolen electronics from NASA, high-performance van parts, and a plutonium-ion battery obtained by a shady corporation, Chuck builds a humanoid robot. He designs the robot to look like an idealized version of his younger self - fitter, stronger, and more attractive. In addition, the robot's A.I. brain is installed with all the positive characteristics and good memories in Chuck's life. Chuck puts everything he ever wanted to be into Vandroid, and the robot now has the opportunity to fulfill his maker's lost potential.

== Development ==
Vandroid started with Nick Demetris Nicola's music and concept. Nick introduced Tommy Lee Edwards to his Vandroid soundtrack, along with the backstory of the 1980s sci-fi action movie that never was. Edwards wanted to build upon the idea of Vandroid's untold story and pulled in writer Noah Smith and artist Dan McDaid to create a comic book series based on the Vandroid synopsis.

== Collected edition ==
The series was collected into a single volume:

- Vandroid (128 pages, paperback) published by Dark Horse Comics and Penguin Random House, November 2014, ISBN 1-61655-495-9
