= The Berlin Batman =

Batman storyline

- Cover of The Batman Chronicles #11 (Win 1998), art by Paul Pope
- Publisher: DC Comics
- Publication date: Winter 1998
- Genre: Superhero
- Title(s): The Batman Chronicles #11

Creative team
- Writer: Paul Pope
- Artist: Paul Pope

"The Berlin Batman" is an Elseworlds tale published in The Batman Chronicles #11 in 1998 by DC Comics. It is written and illustrated by Paul Pope.

== Characters ==
- Baruch Wane, the Batman: By day, Baruch is a wealthy socialite/cubist painter and closeted Jew to the public. By night, he is the mysterious Batman, a foe to all criminals and unjust minds.
- Robin: Baruch's female aide. In 1938, she was training to help Baruch fight crime. By 1998 she had written an unpublished series of memoirs.
- Komissar Garten: The police komissar who had helped confiscate the works of Ludwig von Mises and has a "friendship" with Baruch Wane, unaware that he is both Jewish and the Batman.

== Plot summary ==
In Berlin, Germany in the year 1938, wealthy socialite Baruch Wane learns from his friend Komissar Garten that the police have confiscated the library, works, and notes of Austrian economist Ludwig von Mises, due to his stance against the Nazi Party policy of Adolf Hitler and the Third Reich. Unbeknownst to Garten, Baruch is actually the mysterious Batman who has been terrorizing the wealthy members of the Nazi Party.

Years ago, when Baruch was still a child, he watched his Jewish parents get beaten to death by an antisemitic mob. From that point on, Baruch swore that he would avenge their deaths and spend the rest of his life on a war against all criminals and injustice. As he grew up, he developed his mind and his body, and upon inheriting his parents wealth and estate, he became inspired by a bat which flew into his home and decided to use this symbol as a means to frighten criminals.

The following night of his visit with Garten, Baruch suits up and heads down to the trainyard in order to steal back Mises's works. He tries to stop the train, but when Garten's men surround him, he instead blows up the train so that way Mises's works and ideals do not fall into the wrong hands.

The following is an excerpt from the unpublished memoirs of Baruch's assistant, Robin.

"... Ludwig Von Mises escaped to the United States when the Nazis ransacked his apartment in 1938. It was his landlady, a friend of his mother's, who told the authorities Von Mises was working on a new book which challenged Nazi social and economic policies. They slowed him down, but they couldn't stop him. He continued work on a book which was eventually published in '49, called 'Human Action', now considered one of the great libertarian works of our times. Von Mises anti-authoritarian ideas were first a threat to the Nazis, then the Soviets, and to all increasingly regulatory governments in our own times. He was against socialism in all its many forms. He was an advocate of individual liberty, free speech, and free thinking... and so, should I add, the Berlin Batman. The Batman, as we all know, got better at what he does, and the legends of his exploits continued to grow to this day".

== Collected editions ==
The Berlin Batman was republished alongside the Batman: Year 100 mini-series, also written and illustrated by Pope.

== See also ==
- Human Action
- List of Elseworlds publications
