= Atomics (comics) =

- Cover of the first issue

Publication information
- Publisher: AAA Pop; Dark Horse Comics; Image Comics
- First appearance: The Atomics #1
- Created by: Mike Allred

In-story information
- Type of organization: Super hero team
- Base(s): Snap City
- Agent(s): Madman; It Girl; Mr. Gum; Zap Man; Lava Lass; The Slug; Adam Balm; Black Crystal; The Lazer; Horn; Carla

The Atomics is a fictional superhero team first appearing in The Atomics #1 from AAA Pop Comics, created by Mike Allred. Its members include Madman, It Girl, Mr. Gum, Zap Man, Lava Lass, The Slug, Adam Balm, Black Crystal, and The Lazer. Their headquarters are located in Snap City.

== Publication history ==
Twelve monthly-dated issues were published in 2000, and in 2001, two issues in the first half and one in the second. The March 2000 issue had a French edition, and a hardcover "limited" edition appeared in 2002.

Since the cancellation of The Atomics, the team has appeared as supporting characters in Madman and Madman Atomic Comics; December 2007 saw a trade paperback entitled Madman and the Atomics.

== Fictional team history ==
Former enemies, now allies, are the Mutant Street Beatniks who were originally just ordinary beatniks. When Mott first arrived he was being chased by Zenelle, a female alien from a species infamous throughout the galaxy for devouring their mates after the wedding night. Zenelle left behind a trail of spores as she tracked Mott through the city, exposure to which caused the beatniks to mutate into disgusting, warty versions of themselves. Zenelle fell in love with one of these mutants and carried him away, much to the relief of Mott.

Blaming Madman for their deformity, the Mutant Street Beatniks remained bitter enemies until several of them discovered that their deformation was simply the first stage of their mutation, which gave them super powers such as elasticity. Discovering these powers cleared up their skin condition, so they no longer hate Madman and have formed a super-hero team calling themselves The Atomics. Around this time, their missing comrade returned from space, revealing that Zenelle had actually fallen in love with him to the degree she went against her culture and refused to eat him. Because of the different time-flow between Snap City and Zenelle's planet, when their comrade returned he brought with him his teenage son, the product of his union with Zenelle.
