= IZombie (comic book) =

Comic book series published by Vertigo

iZombie
- Cover page of #1

Publication information
- Publisher: Vertigo
- Schedule: Monthly
- Format: Ongoing series
- Genre: Horror
- Publication date: 2010–2012
- No. of issues: 28
- Main character(s): Gwen Dylan; Ellie Stuart; Scott "Spot"; Horatio

Creative team
- Created by: Roberson & Allred
- Written by: Chris Roberson
- Artist(s): Michael Allred; Jay Stephens; Jason Bone; James Rugg
- Letterer: Todd Klein
- Colourist: Laura Allred
- Editor: Shelly Bond

Collected editions
- Dead to the World: ISBN 1-4012-2965-4
- uVampire: ISBN 1-4012-3296-5
- Six Feet Under & Rising: ISBN 1-4012-3370-8
- Repossession: ISBN 1-4012-3697-9

iZombie, originally titled I, Zombie, is a comic book series created by writer Chris Roberson and artist Michael Allred, published by DC Comics' Vertigo imprint beginning in 2010. The series deals with Gwen Dylan (née Gwendolyn Price), a revenant gravedigger in Eugene, Oregon, and her friends Ellie, a 1960s ghost, and Scott, a were-terrier. As a result of being bitten by a mummy, Gwen needs to eat a brain once a month to keep herself from regressing into a stereotypically primitive and homicidal zombie. As a gravedigger, she has plenty of access to recently deceased people; when she consumes their brains she "inherits" part of the deceased's thoughts. iZombie was nominated for the 2011 Eisner Award for Best New Series.

The "monsters" in iZombie are explained via the concepts of over- and undersoul. The oversoul (as in Ralph Waldo Emerson's "The Over-Soul") is "seated in the brain, contains the thoughts, memories, and personality", while the undersoul (as in Michael McClure's poem "Dark Brown") is "seated in the heart, contains the appetites, emotions and fears". Ghosts are thus bodiless oversouls; poltergeists, bodiless undersouls; vampires bodies without undersouls (thirsting for emotions); and zombies, bodies without oversouls. Revenants, like Gwen, are unique in that they possess both oversouls and undersouls. Souls can also "infect" the living, which accounts for the possessed, werewolves and the like. The characters of iZombie first appeared in a short story in the first House of Mystery Halloween Annual (2009). An iZombie story was also included in the second House of Mystery Halloween Annual (2010).

The comic is notable for its use of real Eugene-area locations as settings, including the University of Oregon campus, the Shelton McMurphey Johnson House, the McDonald Theater, Eugene City Hall, and Ya-Po-Ah Terrace, as well as Portland's Oregon Convention Center and Oregon Zoo, and Devils Lake in Lincoln City. The primary hangout spot, "Dixie's Firehouse", is also known as "Fins" and is located in Springfield, Oregon.

On April 1, 2012, at the Emerald City Comicon, Allred announced that iZombie would end as of #28 in August.

== Themes ==
The not-quite-human twenty-something protagonists battle various ordinary and supernatural threats in and around Eugene, Oregon: vampires, parental fights, zombies, romance triangles, cabin fever, delayed apocalyptic battles and technical support.

== Characters ==
- Gwendolyn "Gwen" Dylan (née Price): The main protagonist, a revenant or main "zombie".
- Eleanor "Ellie" Stuart (née Roosevelt): A ghost who died in the 1960s and had never left Oregon.
- Scott "Spot": A were-terrier, friend to Gwen and Ellie.
- Gavin Price: Gwen's brother and Scott's prospective boyfriend (later husband as of iZombie #28).
- Horatio: A monster hunter and Gwen's boyfriend.
- Vincent Tan: A friend and co-worker of Scott.
- Ashok Patel: A friend and co-worker of Scott and Vincent.
- John Amon: A mummy who was responsible for Gwen Dylan becoming a zombie.

== Adaptation ==
In November 2013, The CW ordered a pilot episode named after the comic from writer/producers Rob Thomas and Diane Ruggiero-Wright, who developed the property as a supernatural procedural drama for the network. On February 25, 2014, Deadline reported that Malcolm Goodwin, Aly Michalka and David Anders were cast as Clive, Peyton and Blaine. On March 7, 2014, actor Robert Buckley was cast as Major, the lead character's former fiancé, a social worker and former college football star who is extremely likable. On March 12, 2014, actress Rose McIver was cast as the lead character Olivia "Liv" Moore. iZombie had been picked up for the 2014-2015 fall season by The CW on May 8, 2014, but was pushed back to air as a mid-season replacement. It debuted on The CW on March 17, 2015 and concluded on August 1, 2019 with 71 episodes airing in total.

While the series retains the lead character's ability to absorb memories and abilities through eating brains, her backstory is substantially changed. Liv (changed from Gwen) is a medical intern in Seattle, Washington who is turned into a zombie after being scratched by one. The series picks up five months after the incident; Liv now works as a King County morgue assistant, along with Dr. Ravi Chakrabarti played by Rahul Kohli, which provides her with a steady supply of brains from murder victims which she must eat in order to retain her intelligence. A side effect of eating brains is that she experiences the deceased's memories in the form of visions, and temporarily absorbs their habits and abilities which she uses to assist in solving crimes.

Michael Allred, co-creator and lead artist for the comic book series, designed and drew the opening credits for the series.

== Collected editions ==
The series has been collected into a number of trade paperbacks:

#	Title	ISBN	Release date	Collected material
1	Dead to the World	ISBN 1-4012-2965-4	March 22, 2011	iZombie #1–5, a story from House of Mystery Halloween Annual #1 and about 11 additional sketches and covers
2	uVampire	ISBN 1-4012-3296-5	September 7, 2011	iZombie #6–12 and a story from House of Mystery Halloween Annual #2
3	Six Feet Under and Rising	ISBN 1-4012-3370-8	February 14, 2012	iZombie #13–18
4	Repossession	ISBN 1-4012-3697-9	December 11, 2012	iZombie #19–28

As well as an omnibus collecting the entire run:

#	Title	ISBN	Release date	Collected material
1	The iZombie Omnibus	ISBN 9781401262037	December 8, 2015	iZombie #1-28 and stories from House of Mystery Halloween Annual #1-2.
