= Batman: Year 100 =

Comic book mini-series

- Cover to trade paperback, art by Paul Pope

Publication information
- Publisher: DC Comics
- Schedule: Monthly
- Format: Limited series
- Publication date: February - May 2006
- No. of issues: 4
- Main character: Batman

Creative team
- Written by: Paul Pope
- Artist: Paul Pope
- Colorist: José Villarrubia

Collected editions
- Batman: Year One Hundred: ISBN 1-4012-1192-5

Batman: Year 100 is a four-issue American comic book miniseries starring Batman, published in 2006 by DC Comics. It was written and illustrated by Paul Pope and colored by José Villarrubia.

== Publication ==
Batman: Year 100 ran from February to May 2006.

== Plot ==
In the year 2039, Gotham City is very nearly a police state, its citizens subject to unwarranted search and seizure. The Gotham Police clash almost daily with Federal agents, who are pursuing the legendary "Batman". Captain Gordon, the grandson of the original Commissioner Gordon, is also trying to find Batman, and find out what he knows about the murder of a Federal agent.

== Collected editions ==
In 2007, the four issues were collected and published as a trade paperback edition (ISBN 1401211925). The trade paperback also includes Pope's "The Berlin Batman", which was originally published in The Batman Chronicles #11. The story features a version of Batman that lived in the German Weimar Republic on the eve of World War II. Editor Lynda Barry wished to include an excerpt from Batman: Year 100 in The Best American Comics 2008 but was denied permission by DC Comics for unstated reasons.

== Awards ==
In 2007, the series won two Eisner Awards for "Best Limited Series" and "Best Writer/Artist".

== See also ==
- List of Elseworlds publications
