= Battling Boy =

Graphic novel

- Date: October 8, 2013
- Main characters: Battling Boy; Haggard West; Aurora West
- Page count: 208 pages
- Publisher: First Second Books

Creative team
- Writer: Paul Pope
- Artist: Paul Pope
- Colorist: Hilary Sycamore
- Editor: Mark Siegel
- ISBN: 978-1596431454

Chronology
- Followed by: The Rise of Aurora West

Battling Boy is a graphic novel by an American artist-writer Paul Pope, published on October 8, 2013, by First Second Books. It was followed by two other volumes: The Rise of Aurora West and The Fall of the House of West.

Battling Boy earned a 2014 Eisner Award for Best Publication for Teens.

== Publication history ==
Battling Boy was preceded in 2013 by The Death of Haggard West, a 32-page pamphlet-format preview.

Volume 2 of Battling Boy, titled The Rise of Aurora West, is a prequel which was co-written by Pope and J. T. Petty, with art by David Rubín. It was published by First Second in 2014. Volume 3, called The Fall of the House of West and also co-written with Petty, with art by Rubín, was published in 2015.

== Plot ==
The city of Arcopolis is besieged by vicious gangs (who kidnap children) and monsters. The local hero, Haggard West, is killed, and the city is helpless, until the arrival of Battling Boy, a demi-god from another world who has reluctantly arrived, forced by his alternately overbearing and neglectful parent to undertake a rite of passage. Powered by magical T-shirts, Battling Boy defends the city, with some success, while also struggling with his vulnerabilities. A side story features Haggard West's daughter, Aurora, who attempts to take her father's place.

== Volumes ==
- The Death of Haggard West (First Second Books, 2013) — 32-page pamphlet-format preview
- vol. 1: Battling Boy (First Second, 2013)
- vol. 2: The Rise of Aurora West (First Second, 2014)
- vol. 3: The Fall of the House of West (First Second, 2015)

== Film adaptation ==
On May 13, 2010, The Hollywood Reporter reported that Paramount Pictures hired David Gordon Green would direct the film adaptation of Battling Boy with Alex Tse writing the script and Plan B Entertainment was set to produce the film adaptation. On July 29, 2015, The Tracking Board reported that Patrick Osborne replaced Green as director of Battling Boy, while Green and Josh Parkinson wrote the latest draft and Plan B Entertainment was still set to produce the film.
