= CLiNT =

Magazine

- Editor: Mark Millar
- Frequency: Monthly
- Publisher: Titan Magazines
- First issue: September 2010
- Final issue: September 2013
- Country: United Kingdom
- Language: English

CLiNT was a monthly British comic magazine launched in September 2010 by Kick-Ass creator Mark Millar, and published by Titan Magazines. As well as comics from Millar it also includes those written by celebrities like Jonathan Ross and Frankie Boyle.

== Contents ==
The magazine began with Millar's Kick-Ass 2, American Jesus, Nemesis and Superior, plus reprints of Jonathan Ross's Turf and Frankie Boyle's original series Rex Royd. There are also regular features including text features and interviews, the subject of the latter in the first issue was comedian Jimmy Carr. Following the conclusion of Kick-Ass 2, the second volume of CLiNT began with Super Crooks as the lead strip for one issue before the launch of Hit-Girl. Millar's The Secret Service, which began in the second volume, features art from Dave Gibbons. The magazine was officially renamed as Mark Millar's CLiNT from August 2012.

On August 14, 2013 Titan announced that the magazine was ending with issue 2.8, to be published that week in the UK.

== Name ==
The title of the magazine, "CLiNT", is controversial in that it has been written with an upper-case "L" followed by a lower-case "i" in order to create a double entendre. This has been a long-running joke in comics because text was usually upper-case and sans-serif, so in order to avoid confusion writers avoided words like "CLINT" and "FLICK" in case poor quality printing caused the letters to blur and be read as "CUNT" and "FUCK".
