= Heavy Liquid (comic book) =

Comic book by Paul Pope

Publication information
- Publisher: Vertigo
- Format: Limited series
- Genre: Cyberpunk
- Publication date: October 1999 – February 2000
- No. of issues: 5

Creative team
- Created by: Paul Pope
- Written by: Paul Pope
- Artist: Paul Pope

Collected editions
- Heavy Liquid: ISBN 1-4012-1949-7

Heavy Liquid is a five-issue limited series written by Paul Pope which has science fiction and cyberpunk elements.

== Plot ==
A former police officer known only as "S" operates as a private detective based in New York City, finding people and objects for a fee. S steals a quantity of a strange substance called "Heavy Liquid". On its own, it is a metallic-liquid explosive, but it turns into "black milk" when cooked, and exhibits mind-altering, drug-like properties. A mysterious art collector who also has a quantity of Heavy Liquid wishes to hire S to find a missing artist named Rodan Esperella (coincidentally S's ex-lover), whom he hopes will create a piece out of the Heavy Liquid for him. In the meantime, assassins are on S's trail, looking to retrieve the stolen Heavy Liquid. S finally trails Esperella to Paris, and he tries to broker a deal between her and the art collector. Esperella promises to sculpt a masterpiece on the condition that she never see S again. His job done, S boards a train heading to Prague, where he is cornered by one of his pursuers. S then discovers from his pursuer that the Heavy Liquid is alien in origin, and may even possess some form of consciousness. Ingesting the drug himself, S escapes by jumping onto another train, his physical abilities dramatically increased by the Heavy Liquid. S comes to understand its nature as a medium containing an alien intelligence. Ultimately, on the European train, S experiences first contact with the being.

== Background and creation ==
Heavy Liquid was created during a transitional period for writer-artist Paul Pope, following his work in Japan for the publisher Kodansha. Pope integrated the fast-paced storytelling techniques of Japanese manga with the gritty, neon-soaked aesthetics of Western cyberpunk fiction. Pope has stated that the visual design of the comic's protagonist, S, and the dystopian New York setting were heavily influenced by the fashion photography of the late 1990s and the underground music scene. The series was noted for its unique use of a limited two-color palette (mostly black, white, and a signature metallic blue/purple hue) by colorist Jay Stephens, which enhanced the neo-noir atmosphere of the book.

== Collected editions ==
The full series was collected in a single hardcover from DC Comics (ISBN 1-40121-949-7).

A second collection of the five original issues was collected by Image Comics in 2019 (ISBN 978-1-5343-1404-7).
