= Red Rocket 7 =

1997 comic book limited series

- Cover of the first issue

Publication information
- Publisher: Dark Horse
- Format: Limited series
- Genre: Science fiction
- Publication date: August 1997 - June 1998
- No. of issues: 7

Creative team
- Created by: Mike Allred
- Written by: Mike Allred
- Artist: Mike Allred
- Letterer: Mike Allred
- Colorist: Laura Allred

Collected editions
- Hardcover: ISBN 1-56971-351-0

Red Rocket 7 is a seven-issue comic book limited series by Mike Allred, published in 1997 by Dark Horse Comics.

== Collected editions ==
It has been collected into trade paperback (ISBN 1569713472), most recently with a tenth anniversary hardcover edition from Image Comics.

== Awards ==
- 1998: Nominated for the "Best Limited Series" Eisner Award.

== Tie-ins ==
Allred also released an album and a film, Astroesque, tied to the comic. They are meant to form a loose trilogy.
