= Paul Pope =

American cartoonist (born 1970)

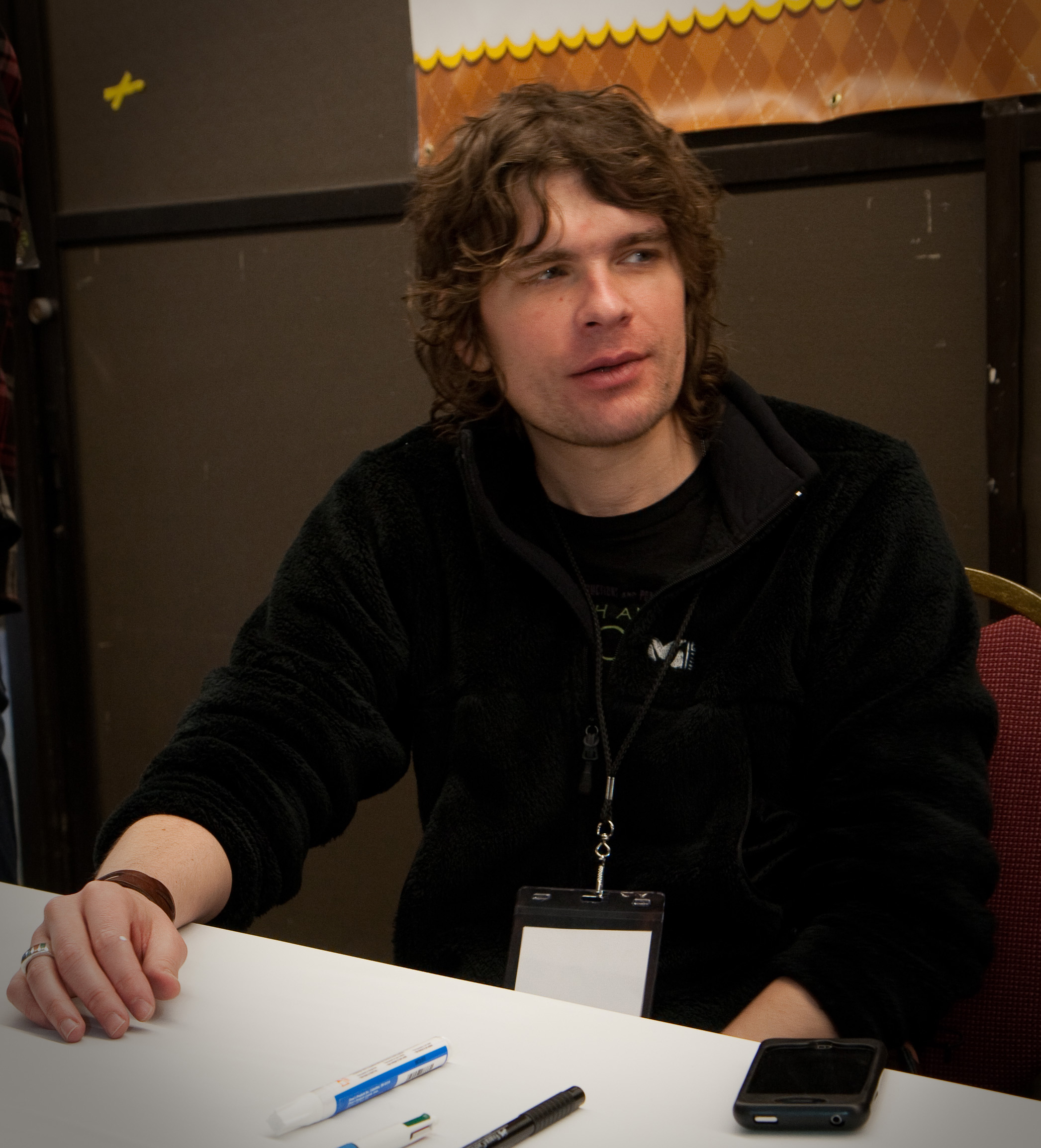
- Born: September 25, 1970 (age 56) Philadelphia, Pennsylvania, U.S.
- Areas: Cartoonist, Writer, Artist, Publisher, Letterer
- Notable works: THB; Batman: Year 100; Heavy Liquid; 100% Battling Boy
- Awards: Best Writer/Artist Eisner Award (2007)

Paul Pope (born September 25, 1970) is an American alternative cartoonist. Pope's work combines the precision and romance of European comics artists with the energy and page design of the manga tradition. Pope's two protagonist types are the silent, lanky outsider male of The One Trick Rip-Off, Escapo, and Heavy Liquid; or the resourceful, aggressive, humorous young teenage girls of THB. He has self-published some of his work, most notably THB, through his own Horse Press, with other work for such publishers as DC Comics/Vertigo and First Second Books.

== Early life ==
Born in Philadelphia, Pope grew up in Bowling Green, Ohio, with stops in Columbus, Ohio, San Francisco, and Toronto in between. He describes his influences as Moebius aka Jean Giraud comics, Daniel Torres, Bruno Premiani, Jack Kirby, Alex Toth, Tony Salmons, Hugo Pratt, Silvio Cadelo, Vittorio Giardino, and Hergé.

== Career ==
Pope introduced THB in 1995, the same year he began work for Kodansha, Japan's manga publisher. Pope eventually developed the manga Supertrouble for Kodansha, which mined the "cutie-pie" girl adventure vein that THB exists in. His storytelling narratives continue to mature with well-paced, deftly-shaded combinations of science fiction, hardboiled crime stories and the Romeo and Juliet archetype.

Pope's One-Trick Ripoff was published by Dark Horse Comics, and Heavy Liquid and 100% were published under DC Comics' Vertigo imprint.

In 2006, Pope received an Eisner Award for Best Short Story for his work, "Teenage Sidekick", published in Solo No. 3.

In 2007, Pope won two additional Eisners, Best Writer/Artist and Best Limited Series, for his Batman mini-series, Batman: Year 100. Discussing the story, which is set in 2039, one hundred years after the first appearance of the caped crusader, Pope said: "I wanted to present a new take on Batman, who is without a doubt a mythic figure in our pop-psyche. My Batman is not only totally science fiction, he's also a very physical superhero: he bleeds, he sweats, he eats. He's someone born into an overarching police state; someone with the body of David Beckham, the brain of Tesla, and the wealth of Howard Hughes... pretending to be Nosferatu." The story, colored by José Villarrubia, was originally presented in a four-part prestige format in 2006. DC Comics later published a trade paperback collecting Batman: Year 100 in early 2007. The trade also includes Pope's "Berlin Batman" story from The Batman Chronicles No. 11. "Berlin Batman" involves a version of Batman who lives in the German Weimar Republic on the eve of World War II. The Weimar Batman helps keep the papers of Austrian School economist Ludwig von Mises from falling into Nazi hands. Both Batman stories in the collection reflect implicit libertarian themes that often appear in Pope's work. He also wrote Endgame for Toonami's website and came up with the character Orcelot Rex.

Aside from comics, in the fall of 2006 Pope worked with Italian clothing company Diesel on a big store installation during their fall fashion week campaign, and a screenprint series based on their 'Chelsea Hotel' campaign as a 51st birthday present to Diesel's founder, Renzo Rosso. In the fall of 2008, Pope went a step further by partnering with DKNY to create the DKNY:2089 collection.

Pope's first art book, titled Pulphope: The Art of Paul Pope, came out in June 2007. A collection of his most representative work, the 224-page hardcover was published by AdHouse Books.

In 2009, Pope was featured in The Cartoonist, a documentary film on the life and work of cartoonist Jeff Smith.

Pope spoke at the 2005 New York and 2006 Sydney Semi-Permanent creative conference.

In 2010, Pope served as a Master Artist with the Atlantic Center for the Arts, a Florida-based artists' community providing artists an opportunity to work and collaborate with contemporary artists in the fields of composing, visual, literary, and performing arts.

Pope lives and works in New York City.

== Awards ==
- 2000 Friends of Lulu Lulu of the Year nomination
- 2006 Eisner Award for Best Short Story: "Teenaged Sidekick" in Solo No. 3 (DC Comics)
- 2007 Eisner Award for Best Limited Series: Batman: Year 100
- 2007 Eisner Award for Best Writer/Artist: Batman: Year 100
- 2010 Reuben Award (National Cartoonists Society) for Best Comic Book for Strange Adventures
- 2014 Eisner Award for Best Publication for Teens: Battling Boy

== Bibliography ==
=== Horse Press ===
- Sin Titulo (w/a, graphic novel, 78 pages, 1993, ISBN 1-882402-13-8)
- The Corruptor (w/a, 1993)
- The Ballad of Doctor Richardson (w/a, 1994)
- THB (w/a):
  - Volume 1 #1–5 (1994–1995)
  - Giant THB Parade (1996)
  - P-City Parade (1997)
  - Giant THB Circus (1998)
  - Mars' Mightiest Mek (one-shot, 2000)
  - Mek-Power #6a-6d (2000–2002)
  - Volume 2 No. 1 (2003)
- PulpHope 96/7 (w/a, 1996)
- Buzz Buzz Comics Magazine (w/a, with various writers and artists, 1996)
- Escapo (w/a, graphic novel, 112 pages, 1999, ISBN 1-882402-16-2)

=== DC Comics/Vertigo ===
- The Big Book of... (a, Paradox Press):
  - "Harry Reichenbach: Hollywood's King of Ballyhoo!!" (with Carl Sifakis, in The Big Book of Hoaxes, 1996)
  - "Glam Rock" (with Jonathan Vankin, in The Big Book of the '70s, 2000)
- Vertigo: Winter's Edge #1: "Tell Me" (a, with Paul Jenkins, 1998)
- Batman:
  - The Batman Chronicles #11: "The Berlin Batman" (w/a, 1998)
  - Batman: Gotham Knights #3: "Broken Nose" (w/a, 2000) collected in Black & White Volume 2 (tpb, 176 pages, 2003, ISBN 1-563899-17-5)
  - Batman: Turning Points #5: "Old as the Stars" (a, with Greg Rucka, 2000) collected in Turning Points (tpb, 128 pages, 2007, ISBN 1-401213-60-X)
  - Batman: Year 100 #1–4 (w/a, 2006) collected as Year 100 (tpb, 232 pages, 2007, ISBN 1-4012-1192-5)
- Heavy Liquid #1–5 (w/a, 1999–2000) collected as Heavy Liquid (tpb, 240 pages, 2001, ISBN 1-563896-35-4; hc, 256 pages, 2008, ISBN 1-401219-49-7)
- 100% #1–5 (w/a, 2002–2003) collected as 100% (tpb, 240 pages, 2005, ISBN 1-401203-49-3; hc, 2009, ISBN 1-401221-33-5)
- Weird War Tales Special: "Mind Field" (a, with Bruce Jones, 2000)
- Young Heroes: Fall Fashion 2000 (a, with Heather Elizaldi, a 4-page advertisement ran through all DC books dated October, 2000)
- The Dreaming #55: "The Further Adventures of Danny Nod, Heroic Library Assistant" (a, with Bill Willingham, among other artists, 2000)
- Weird Western Tales #1: "Tall Tale" (w/a, 2000)
- Bizarro Comics: "Help! Superman!" (a, with Jeff Smith, anthology graphic novel, hc, 224 pages, 2001, ISBN 1-563897-79-2)
- Solo No. 3 (w/a, 2005)
- Wednesday Comics #1–12: "Adam Strange" (w/a, 2009) collected in Wednesday Comics (hc, 200 pages, 2009, ISBN 1-4012-2747-3)
- Ghosts: "Treasure Lost" (w/a, with David Lapham, 2012)

=== Other US publishers ===
- Negative Burn (Caliber):
  - "Eulogy to Marx" (w/a, in No. 12, 1994)
  - "The Triumph of Hunger" (w/a, in No. 13, 1994)
  - "Rotten Hubert" (w/a, in No. 18, 1994)
  - "Portrait of a Girl With an Unpronounceable Name" (w/a, in No. 20, 1995)
  - "The Visible Man" (w/a, in No. 21, 1995)
  - "Armadillo/The Island" (a, with Francis Richardson, in No. 23, 1995)
  - "Gangster Strip Dragway" (w/a, in No. 24, 1995)
  - "Strip for 6.30.93" (w/a, in No. 25, 1995)
- Dark Horse Presents (w/a, Dark Horse):
  - "Pistachio!!" (in v1 #100-0, 1995)
  - "Yes" (in v1 #100-2, 1995)
  - "Pan-Fried Girl" (with Jeff Smith, in v1 #100-5, 1995)
  - "The One Trick Rip-Off" (in v1 #101–112, 1995–1996) collected as The One Trick Rip-Off (tpb, 104 pages, 1997, ISBN 1-569712-44-1)
  - "Four Cats" (in Annual '97, 1998)
  - "1969" (in v2 No. 9, 2012)
- Roarin' Rick's Rare Bit Fiends #9: "Untitled" (w/a, King Hell, 1995)
- Dirty Stories #1: "Ukieo-E-Pope" (w/a, Fantagraphics Books, 1997)
- Oni Double Feature #2–3: "Car Crash" (w/a, Oni Press, 1998)
- The Spirit: The New Adventures #7: "The Ghost of Tiger Traps" (a, with Jay Stephens, Kitchen Sink, 1998) collected in Will Eisner's The Spirit Archives Volume 27 (hc, 200 pages, Dark Horse, 2009, ISBN 1-56971-732-X)
- Bone #36: "Woah! Just 36 Seconds to Diffuse This TNT!!" (w/a, Cartoon Books, 1999)
- Non #5: "Airplanes" (w/a, Red Ink, 2001)
- Michael Neno's Reactionary Tales No. 1 :"The Ballad of Michael Neno" (w/a, Neno Productions, 2001)
- Marvel:
  - Spider-Man's Tangled Web #15: "The Collaborator" (w/a, 2002) collected in Volume 3 (tpb, 160 pages, 2002, ISBN 0-785109-51-X)
  - Captain America: Red, White & Blue: "Faces" (w/a, graphic novel, hc, 192 pages, 2002, ISBN 0-785110-33-X)
  - X-Statix #5: "The Mysterious Fan Boy" (a, with Peter Milligan, 2003) collected in Good Omens (tpb, 128 pages, 2003, ISBN 0-785110-59-3)
  - Fantastic Four #543: "A Day at the Races!" (w/a, 2007) collected in Civil War (tpb, 176 pages, 2007, ISBN 0-785122-27-3)
  - Strange Tales #1: "Untitled" (w/a, 2009) collected in Strange Tales (hc, 192 pages, 2010, ISBN 0-7851-4626-1; tpb, 2010, ISBN 0-7851-2802-6)
- Rosetta: A Comics Anthology Volume 2 (w/a, anthology graphic novel, 268 pages, Alternative Comics, 2004, ISBN 1-89186-762-8)
- AdHouse Books:
  - Project: Superior: "The Rest of Xondex-Xomax" (w/a, anthology graphic novel, 288 pages, 2005, ISBN 0-972179-48-8)
  - PulpHope: The Art of Paul Pope (w/a, graphic novel, 224 pages, 2007, ISBN 0-977030-43-1)
  - THB: Comics from Mars #1–2 (w/a, 2007–2010)
- The Lone Ranger #11: "Downbeat" (a, with Brett Matthews and Sergio Cariello, Dynamite, 2008)
- CBLDF Presents: Liberty Comics #2: "Place 4 Loverman!!" (w/a, Image, 2009)
- Strange Science Fantasy #1–6 (w/a, co-feature, IDW Publishing, 2010) collected in Strange Science Fantasy (tpb, 196 pages 2011, ISBN 1-600108-88-1)
- Adventure Time #5: "Emit Erutnevda!!" (w/a, co-feature, Boom! Studios, 2012)
- Battling Boy (First Second Books)
  - The Death of Haggard West (2013) — 32-page pamphlet-format preview of Battling Boy vol. 1
  - vol. 1: Battling Boy (2013)
  - vol. 2: The Rise of Aurora West (2014) — prequel to Battling Boy written with J. T. Petty; art by David Rubín
  - vol. 3: The Fall of the House of West (2015) — written with J. T. Petty; art by David Rubín

=== Cover work ===
- The Comics Journal No. 191 (Fantagraphics Books, 1996)
- Catwoman #5–9 (DC Comics, 2002)
- The Escapists No. 5 (Dark Horse, 2006)
- Cory Doctorow's Futuristic Tales of the Here and Now No. 3 (IDW Publishing, 2007)
- Silver Surfer: In Thy Name No. 3 (Marvel, 2007)
- Popgun Volume 2 gn (Image, 2008)
- The Haunted Tank No. 2 (Vertigo, 2009)
- The Sandman: The Dream Hunters No. 3 (Vertigo, 2009)
- Jersey Gods No. 3 (Image, 2009)
- The Unknown No. 1 (Boom! Studios, 2009)
- Hexed HC (Boom! Studios, 2009)
- Electric Ant #1–5 (Marvel, 2010)
- Jurassic Park No. 3 (IDW Publishing, 2010)
- American Vampire No. 5 (Vertigo, 2010)
- Dark Horse Presents No. 1 (Dark Horse, 2011)
- Strange Adventures No. 1 (Vertigo, 2011)
- Diamond Comics No. 6 (Floating World Comics, 2011)
- Before Watchmen: Dr. Manhattan No. 1 (DC Comics, 2012)
- Adventure Time No. 11 (Boom! Studios, 2012)
- Spider-Gwen: Into the Unknown No. 7 (Marvel Comics, 2020)
