= Clyde Wyncham =

Publication information
- Publisher: Marvel Comics
- First appearance: Marvel 1985 #2 (2008)
- Created by: Mark Millar

In-story information
- Alter ego: Clyde Wyncham
- Species: Mutant
- Notable aliases: Marquis of Death
- Abilities: Reality warping Matter manipulation Energy manipulation Energy projection Transmutation; Teleportation; Telepathy; Telekinesis; Mind control Illusion casting Shapeshifting; Resurrection; Immortality; Invulnerability; Time travel

Clyde Wyncham is a fictional character appearing in American comic books published by Marvel Comics. The character has appeared or been referenced in Mark Millar's works Marvel 1985 and Kick-Ass, and his runs on Fantastic Four and Old Man Logan. Clyde Wyncham is notable in that he ties all of Millar's series together.

== Fictional character biography ==
Clyde Wyncham is the only mutant of Earth-1219, a reality similar to the real world. Clyde possesses vast reality-manipulating abilities, including the ability to control minds and resurrect the dead. In 1964, he unwittingly coerces a crowd of people to surround his home, including his dead father, whom he had unintentionally resurrected. Clyde's mother is horrified and strikes him with a candlestick, leaving him with permanent brain damage. His mother leaves him to live in an asylum.

Clyde has been in an institution ever since his mother's attack. The nurses left his comic book collection behind, which angered the vegetative Clyde. In 1985, Clyde summons Marvel supervillains to his world, causing great death and destruction. Jerry Goodman steals a comic collection back from a comic shop, where the villains had sold it, in an effort to appease Clyde. Before Clyde can stop the villains, the Red Skull shoots Jerry with a machine gun. Clyde is shocked and returns the villains to Earth-616. Jerry is brought to Earth-616 for treatment; years later, he recovers after being treated by Jane Foster and Donald Blake. Clyde is placed in a holding cell in Area 87 and given a cybernetic helmet designed to keep him in a permanent state of pleasant dreams.

== Powers and abilities ==
Clyde is capable of reality manipulation on a massive scale. He is immortal and can open portals to other dimensions/realities, time travel, resurrect the dead, manipulate matter, shapeshift, teleport, generate massive amounts of energy, project telepathic illusions, and mind control high-level cosmic entities. He is also highly durable as it took Planck temperature to defeat him after he was severely weakened from fighting.

== Other versions ==
The Marquis of Death is a future incarnation of Clyde Wyncham from a parallel universe where he escaped his imprisonment from Area 87 and had his mind fully restored following an attack led by several supervillains, all of whom he killed with but a thought.
