= Madman (Mike Allred character) =

Fictional character created by Mike Allred

- Madman: The Oddity Odyssey. Cover art by Mike Allred

Publication information
- Publisher: Caliber Comics; Tundra; IDW Publishing; Image Comics; Oni Press; Dark Horse Comics; AAA Pop
- First appearance: Creatures of the Id (Oct. 1990)
- Created by: Mike Allred

In-story information
- Alter ego: Zane Townsend
- Team affiliations: The Atomics
- Notable aliases: Frank Einstein
- Abilities: Supernatural aptitude in learning Psychometry; Empathy; Clairvoyance; Amplified physical capabilities with superhuman agility and reflexes

Madman is a creator-owned fictional superhero that appears in comic books by creator Mike Allred and which has been published by a number of publishers over the years. The character first appeared in Creatures of the Id #1 (Oct. 1990). His name, Frank Einstein, is a combination of Frank Sinatra and Albert Einstein, and is also a reference to Frankenstein.

== Fictional character biography ==
Frank Einstein was born Zane Townsend, an agent of the Tri-Eye Agency. Townsend was killed in a car accident, then stitched back together and brought to life by two scientists, Dr. Egon Boiffard and Dr. Gillespie Flem. This resurrection left him amnesic, and the resurrected John Doe was named after Boiffard's artistic and scientific heroes, Frank Sinatra and Albert Einstein, respectively. The procedure left Frank with amplified physical capabilities with superhuman agility and reflexes and a slight degree of precognitive and empathic power; however, he remembers nothing about his former life, but faint, troubling memories relating to his death. Madman's costume is based on the only thing he can clearly remember: a fascination with a comic book character called Mr. Excitement.

Frank Einstein now lives as a jack-of-all-trades wanderer, accompanied by a variety of allies, including the Atomics. Only one of Frank's reanimators, Dr. Flem, is still in Frank's life. Dr. Boiffard, in an attempt to boost his brain power, transmuted his entire head into neural tissue, leaving him an invalid in a hospital. Later, Boiffard became a cosmic being. Despite the fact Frank has blue skin, a metal scalp plate, and criss-crossed scars similar to Frankenstein's monster, he has a steady girlfriend, a secretary by the name of Josephine "Joe" Lombard. Madman's other allies include Mott, an alien from the planet Hoople, who was saved by Frank when another alien, Zenelle, wanted to marry and eat Mott; Gale, an invisible female scientist who was tattooed by Dr. Flem's mutant clones and further rendered invisible by her attempts to eliminate the tattoos; and Astroman and Machina, a pair of robotic humanoids. Astroman was built to be an aid to Frank and was loaded with some of Frank's lost information. Astroman grew to love Frank's girlfriend, Joe, which made Machina very jealous. Frank's also aided by Marie and Warren, two artificial intelligences from the future.

Due to a plot by the mischievous Mister Mxyzptlk, Madman and Superman switched dimensions, becoming physical hybrids of each other. They then had to retrieve portions of Superman's powers, which had been doled out amongst various people across both worlds. Finally, the two confronted Mister Mxyzptlk, and Madman defeated him in a game of Twister before tricking him into saying his name backwards.

Currently, Joe had been fused with Luna (It Girl) and has recently been "pulled" from her body. Frank has met with ghosts and learned more about his previous life, including great insights to the ways of the universe. After Frank is told of Joe being pulled from Luna, he rushes back to Dr. Flem's laboratory, but finds that Mr. Monstadt has returned in a new, artificial body which is powerful enough to defeat him, most of the Atomics, and Joe, who was going to surprise Frank by becoming Madgirl. Immediately after the defeat of Monstadt, a fallen Atomic is revived and the team celebrates by going on a camping trip.

Madman has a cameo appearance in Invincible #60 (2009), appearing alongside other heroes from the Image Universe during "The Invincible War".

=== The Atomics ===
Former enemies, now allies, are the Mutant Street Beatniks, who were originally just ordinary beatniks. When Mott first arrived he was being chased by Zenelle, a female alien from a species infamous throughout the galaxy for devouring their mates after the wedding night. Zenelle left behind a trail of spores as she tracked Mott through the city, exposure to which caused the beatniks to mutate into disgusting, warty versions of themselves. Zenelle fell in love with one of these mutants and carried him away, much to the relief of Mott.

Blaming Madman for their deformity, the Mutant Street Beatniks remained bitter enemies until they discovered that their deformation was simply the first stage of their mutation, which later gave them super powers. Discovering these powers cleared up their skin condition, they no longer hate Madman and have formed a superhero team, calling themselves the Atomics. Around this time, their missing comrade returned from space, revealing that Zenelle had actually fallen in love with him to the degree she went against her culture and refused to eat him. Because of the different time-flow between Snap City and Zenelle's planet, when their comrade returned he brought with him his teenage son, the product of his union with Zenelle.

=== Antagonists ===
One of Madman's primary enemies is Mr. Monstadt, his former employer (or so it is hinted). Madman has also fought runaway renegade robots from Dr. Flem's lab who were controlled by the mysterious and super-intelligent Factor Max. Other antagonists include the Mutant Street Beatniks, the Moonboys, the Puke, the G-Men from Hell, Mattress, and Crept. However, the G-Men are occasional allies, and several of the Mutant Street Beatniks become allies as well. Frank has also faced generic monsters a number of times.

== Powers and abilities ==
Frank's resurrection altered his body, giving him various supernatural abilities. He possesses a supernatural intuitive talent for learning, allowing him to instinctively learn any skill and gain knowledge at a superhuman rate. He has amplified physical capabilities such as strength, flexibility and speed. His agility and reflexes are superhuman. His tendons and connective tissues are more elastic and his nerve endings transfer stimuli faster. He can even dodge shots at close range.

Frank has also manifested numerous psionic abilities that border on the supernatural, including the power to obtain information about an individual by making physical contact, empathy, and clairvoyance. He is also able to perceive the future, sometimes manifesting in vague dreams while asleep, other times displayed in clear thought, and sometimes occurring at will. Unfortunately, he does not have complete control over his psionic abilities.

== Collected editions ==
=== Trade paperbacks ===
| Title | Material collected | Publisher | Publication date | ISBN |
|---|---|---|---|---|
| Madman Comics: Yearbook '95 | Madman Comics #1-5 | Dark Horse Comics | 1996 | 978-1569711491 |
| The Complete Madman Comics Vol. 2 | Madman Comics #6-10 | Dark Horse Comics | April 1997 | 978-1569711866 |
| The Complete Madman Comics Vol. 3 (originally Madman Comics 3: The Exit of Dr. Boiffard) | Madman Comics #11-15 | Dark Horse Comics | September 2000 | 978-1569714706 |
| The Complete Madman Comics Vol. 4 (originally Madman Comics: Heaven and Hell) | Madman Comics #16-20 | Dark Horse Comics | August 2001 | 978-1569715819 |
| The Superman/Madman Hullabaloo! | The Superman/Madman Hullabaloo! #1-3 | Dark Horse Comics | February 1998 | 978-1569713013 |
| Madman Boogaloo! | Nexus Meets Madman, Madman/The Jam #1-2 | Dark Horse Comics | June 1999 | 978-1569714041 |
| Madman, Vol. 1: The Oddity Odyssey | Madman #1-3 | Oni Press | February 2002 | 978-1929998289 |
| Madman, Vol. 2: Madman Adventures | Madman Adventures #1-3 | Oni Press | July 2002 | 978-1929998296 |
| The Atomics: Spaced Out and Grounded in Snap City | It Girl one-shot, Mr. Gum one-shot, Spaceman one-shot, Crash Metro and the Star Squad one-shot | Oni Press | October 2003 | 978-1929998678 |
| Madman Vol. 1 | Madman #1-3, Madman Adventures #1-3 | Image Comics | September 2007 | 978-1582408101 |
| Madman Vol. 2 | Madman Comics #1-11 | Image Comics | November 2007 | 978-1582408118 |
| Madman Vol. 3 | Madman Comics #12-20, Madman King-size Super Groovy Special | Image Comics | January 2008 | 978-1582408934 |
| Madman and the Atomics Vol. 1 | The Atomics #1-15 | Image Comics | December 2007 | 978-1582408125 |
| Madman Atomic Comics Vol. 1: Existential Exits! | Madman Atomic Comics #1-7 | Image Comics | August 5, 2008 | 978-1582409160 |
| Madman Atomic Comics Vol. 2: Paranormal Paradise! | Madman Atomic Comics #8-13 | Image Comics | March 24, 2009 | 978-1607060147 |
| Madman Atomic Comics Vol. 3: Electric Allegories! | Madman Atomic Comics #14-17 | Image Comics | May 18, 2010 | 978-1607062639 |

=== Hardcovers ===
| Title | Material collected | Publisher | Publication date | ISBN |
|---|---|---|---|---|
| Madman Two Trilogies: The Tundra Age (Limited edition of 1500, signed by Mike and Laura Allred) | Madman #1-3, Madman Adventures #1-3, "For the Record" excerpt from Creatures of the Id #1 | Graphitti Designs | 1995 | 978-0936211480 |
| Madman Limited Edition Box Set | Madman Comics #1-10 | Dark Horse Comics | June 1997 | 978-1569711941 |
| The Atomics Super Deluxe Limited Edition | The Atomics #1-15 | AAA Pop Comics | 2001 | |
| Madman Picture Exhibition Limited Edition | Madman Picture Exhibition #1-4 | AAA Pop Comics | 2004 | |
| Madman Gargantua! | Madman #1-3, Madman Adventures #1-3, Madman Comics #1-20, Madman King-size Super Groovy Special | Image Comics | July 2007 | 978-1582407401 |
| Madman Atomica! | The Atomics #1-15, Madman Atomic Comics #1-17, Madman King-Size Super Groovy Special, It Girl, Mr. Gum | Image Comics | April 2011 | 978-1607063414 |
| Madman 20th Anniversary Monster | Madman Picture Exhibition #1-4 plus new material | Image Comics | February 2012 | 978-1607064725 |
| Madman: Quarter Century Shindig | Various selections by Allred | IDW Limited | 2018 | 978-1684053834 |
| Madman Library Edition Volume 1 | "For the Record" excerpt from Creatures of the Id #1, Madman #1-3, Madman Adventures #1-3, Madman Comics #1-10, THEY! | Dark Horse Comics | 16 June 2021 | 978-1506722443 |
| Madman Library Edition Volume 2 | Madman Comics #11-20, Superman/Madman Hullabaloo, Nexus Meets Madman, Madman Jam, Madman King-Size Super Groovy Special!, Who Killed Madman?, Madman All-New, Giant-Size Super Ginchy Special!, Madman Monster!, and “Madman Detour to Armenia” | Dark Horse Comics | 11 January 2022 | 978-1506722450 |
| Madman Library Edition Volume 3 | The Atomics #1-15, Red Rocket 7 #1-7 | Dark Horse Comics | 20 September 2022 | 978-1506730035 |
| Madman Library Edition Volume 4 | Madman Atomic Comics #1-17, It Girl, Spaceman, Mr. Gum | Dark Horse Comics | 18 April 2023 | 978-1506730042 |
| Madman Library Edition Volume 5 | It Girl and the Atomics #1-12, Dead Air, The Everyman, Crash Metro and the Star Squad, Dark Horse Extra: Madman | Dark Horse Comics | 5 December 2023 | 978-1506730059 |
| Madman Library Edition Volume 6 | Graphique Musique #1-3, Grafik Muzik #1-4, Madman in Your Face 3D Special, Mr.Gum: Who Will Sell Out? You Sell Out?, X-Ray Robot #1-4 | Dark Horse Comics | 25 June 2024 | 978-1506738062 |

== In other media ==
=== Film adaptation ===
In 1998, filmmaker Robert Rodriguez obtained the film rights to Madman. He maintained collaboration with Allred throughout the on-and-off preproduction. In a 2000 interview, Allred mentioned that he had been in contact with Robin Williams for the role of Dr. Flem. Remarks from Rodriguez and Allred about finalizing the script and moving to casting and filming were made as late as 2010, though full production on the film never commenced.

In 2015, Allred indicated on Twitter that the rights to Madman had reverted to him, and in September 2019 has stated that he prefers to focus on comics rather than film or television adaptations for the time being.

=== View Askewniverse appearances ===
Allred did the artwork for the fictional Bluntman and Chronic comic in the film Chasing Amy (in which he appears in a cameo as himself). The pages were collected as part of the film's published screenplay, and Madman can be seen in one panel beneath the light of the "blunt signal." In the Chasing Amy DVD commentary, Ben Affleck and Kevin Smith state that in one take the character can be seen reading Madman, and that in more than one take Ben Affleck describes Madman as "a classy book." In Smith's Dogma, a Madman action figure can be seen on the shelf of a toy store aisle.

=== Action figure ===
Madman's first action figure was released in 1998 in the "Big Blast" toy line from Graphitti Designs. The figure came in classic white with a red lightning bolt, as well as a black-suited variant with yellow accents and lightning bolt. Wizard Entertainment offered a variant of the Madman Big Blast toy without his traditional mask, showing Frank's face. Other toys in the line included Matt Wagner's first Grendel (Hunter Rose), Kevin Matchstick from Mage, and Christine Spar as Grendel. Madman appears as part of the first wave of the Legendary Comic Book Heroes action figure series in 2007, along with Judge Dredd, Savage Dragon, and Sara Pezzini of Witchblade. In 2014, a Madman figure was released through an Amazing Heroes Kickstarter campaign.
