= THB (comics) =

Comic book series by Paul Pope

Publication information
- Publisher: Horse Press; AdHouse Books
- Format: Ongoing series
- Genre: Science fiction
- Publication date: THB; October 1994 - March 1995; THB: Mek-Power; 2000 - 2001; Giant THB; 2003; THB: Comics From Mars; 2007-2010
- No. of issues: THB; 6 THB: Mek-Power; 4 Giant THB; 1 THB: Comics From Mars; 2

Creative team
- Created by: Paul Pope
- Written by: Paul Pope

THB is a creator-owned science-fiction comic book series by Paul Pope. Set on a future Mars, the series and associated short stories follow the adventures of a teenage girl and her super-powered robot bodyguard.

== Publication history ==
Pope self-published issue #1 of THB in 1994 through his own Horse Press — during a new wave of black-and-white independent comic books that included Bone, Hepcats, and Starchild.

Prior to THB, Pope had self-published two graphic novels through Horse Press: Sin Titulo (1993) and The Ballad of Doctor Richardson (1994).

Pope has sporadically published THB issues and short stories since its 1994 debut. The comics can be divided into two general categories:

1. The main THB storyline (currently standing at 11 issues)
2. Multiple THB short stories and short-story collections

=== THB main storyline to date (original single-issue publications) ===
Title	Publication Date	Publisher	Notes
THB #1	October 1994	Horse Press (self-published)	104 pages
THB #2	December 1994	Horse Press (self-published)	56 pages
THB #3	January 1995	Horse Press (self-published)	60 pages
THB #4	February 1995	Horse Press (self-published)	56 pages
THB #5	March 1995	Horse Press (self-published)	60 pages
THB 1.v.2	Late 1995	Horse Press (self-published)	104 pages; re-publishing of THB #1 with approx. 40 new/re-drafted pages
THB: Mek-Power 6a	August 2000	Horse Press (self-published)	72 pages
THB: Mek-Power 6b	October 2000	Horse Press (self-published)	72 pages
THB: Mek-Power 6c	November 2000	Horse Press (self-published)	72 pages
THB: Mek-Power 6d	October 2001	Horse Press (self-published)	96 pages
Giant THB 1.v.2	December 2003	Horse Press (self-published)	96 pages; first issue in the main storyline printed in an oversized format

Pope has said he plans to conclude the series' main storyline.

=== THB short stories ===
Title	Publication Date	Publisher / Publication Appearance	Notes
"Pan-Fried Girl: Episode 67: The Tax Auditor"	August 1995	Appears in Dark Horse Presents #100.5	8-page story written/drawn with Jeff Smith
"Supergag Comics" / "Pistachio" / "Three Is A Magic Number"	1996	Three stories appearing in Buzz Buzz Comics Magazine (Horse Press, self-published)	"Supergag Comics" is a 6-page "jam comic" between Pope and Jay Stephens
Giant THB Parade	October 1996	Horse Press (self-published)	96 pages, tabloid-sized
P-City Parade	January 1997	Horse Press (self-published)	84 pages; contains excerpts from unfinished THB story "Pig Dog Parade"
THB Circus	January 1998	Horse Press (self-published)	128 pages, tabloid-sized
"Hidden Face"	June 1999	Appears in Escapo (Horse Press, self-published)	Color reprint of 8-page story that first appeared in THB Circus
THB M3: Mars' Mightiest Mek	December 1999	Horse Press (self-published)	64 pages
PULPHOPE.A	October 2006	Adhouse Books	Limited-edition ashcan, 200 copies printed
THB: Comics from Mars #1	2007	Adhouse Books	36 pages; debuted at 2007 San Diego Comicon
THB: Comics from Mars #2	2010	Adhouse Books	36 pages
"The Zhuk"	2014	Appears in The One Trick Rip-Off + Deep Cuts (Image Comics)	A 14-page "young HR Watson" story, originally drawn in 1996; based on a poem by composer Modest Mussorgsky; colors by Dominic Regan
"Good Morning"	2021	Appears in LAAB comics tabloid newspaper (Issue #2), crowdfunded through Beehive Books	1 page

=== Total THB ===
On Nov. 11, 2025, 23rd St Books released Total THB (Volume 1), a 208-page trade paperback collecting material from Issues 1-4 of the original series. The original artwork was scanned and re-mastered for the new collection.

Total THB (Volume 2) was released on July 21, 2026, and Total THB (Volume 3) is scheduled for publication on Dec. 1, 2026.

== Plot ==
A sci-fi story set on a future colonized Mars, THB chronicles the adventures of teenage girl HR Watson and THB, her super-powered robot bodyguard.

THB is a "Super-Mek." Its name stands for "Tri-Hydro Bi-oxygenate," a fictional molecule created by Pope. When un-activated, THB resembles a small rubber ball carried in a necklace worn by HR Watson; when activated with water, THB expands to take the form of a purple, seven-foot (215 cm) tall, super-powered humanoid resembling a genie.

HR is the daughter of wealthy robot manufacturer Clovis Watson, and lives with him in Velo City while attending classes at the Academy of Advanced Disciplines.

In the series' main storyline, HR's father makes plans to move his business outside the taxable boundaries of V-City and mine the asteroid belt, assisted by his bodyguard and right-hand man Mister McHaine. This attracts the attention of the ruling Buranchist Party, or "Bugfaces." The Bugfaces attempt to take HR in for questioning by sending a series of robot agents to capture her; one robot agent is delivered to her home disguised as a Steinway piano.

Following a series of wild chases, HR flees with THB across the desert to Plutonium City — hiding out with her older step-brother Percy and members of a popular musical group, the Complex Passions. She continues to evade capture while falling for the band's lead clarinetist, The Jiggler. She is assisted from afar by her best friend Lollie Perducci, daughter of a famous opera singer, and Lollie's intelligent pet Mister Pig-Dog.

Pope has also written and drawn numerous THB short stories, many of them chronicling the comic misadventures of HR and Lollie, as well as stand-alone tales featuring one-off characters set in other parts of the THB universe.

=== 'Super Trouble' ===
In the 1990s, Pope developed "Super Trouble," a potential manga series featuring mischievous teen characters visually identical to HR Watson and Lollie, but with different names and personalities, set in a science-fiction universe visually similar to THB's. After meeting editors from the Japanese publishing house Kodansha in 1994, Pope was hired to develop a potential manga series. "They asked me to propose some story ideas for them," Pope recalled in an interview for the introduction to The One Trick Rip-Off + Deep Cuts. "They loved THB, but only wanted the 'cutie-pie' girl aspect. They didn't get the giant super-meks, surprisingly." Kodansha declined to publish the "Super Trouble" pages Pope produced in 1996, though they invited him to Japan to develop other projects. Thirty-nine pages of "Super Trouble" were collected for the first time in 2014's The One Trick Rip-Off + Deep Cuts.

== Awards ==
- 1995: Nominated for "Best New Series" Eisner Award
