= Plot hole =

Gap or inconsistency in a storyline

In fiction, a plot hole, plothole, or plot error is an inconsistency in a storyline that goes against the flow of logic established by the story's plot.

Plot holes are usually created unintentionally, often as a result of editing, or the writers simply forgetting that a new event would contradict previous events in the storyline.

Sometimes, viewers may disagree on whether a certain plot element constitutes an error.

== Types ==
Types of plot hole include:

Factual errors
Historical anachronisms, or incorrect statements about the world.
Impossible events
Something that defies the laws of science, as established for the story's setting.
Out-of-character behavior
A character acting in a way that, based on their understanding of the options available to them, they would not realistically choose.
Continuity errors
Events in the story which contradict those established earlier.
Unresolved storylines
One of the plot lines is not resolved by the end of the story, or a character who is expected to reappear does not.

== Examples ==
- At the end of the Star Wars film Revenge of the Sith, it is considered imperative to hide Luke Skywalker from Darth Vader, but Obi-Wan Kenobi does so in plain sight on Vader's home planet, even using Luke's real name. He himself only slightly alters his name and makes no secret of his Jedi heritage. This plot hole was caused by the fact that Star Wars movies weren't released chronologically.
- In the narrative climax of The Lord of the Rings, Frodo Baggins and Samwise Gamgee are rescued from Mordor by three giant eagles after destroying the One Ring. Some readers and viewers of the film adaptation have regarded this as a plot hole because the eagles could have flown a suitable Ring-bearer directly to Mordor in the first place, obviating much of the story's plot. Craig Elvy of Screen Rant believes the perception of a plot hole might be due in part to the significantly compressed space and time dimensions of the film version, compared to the books.
- The 1991 Disney film Beauty and the Beast includes a line about a rose blooming until the prince's twenty-first year, and a song in which Lumière the candelabra sings "ten years we've been rusting" – implying that the Prince was 11 when the curse was placed upon the castle, despite a painting showing him to have been older than this. The 2017 remake removed the rose reference and changed the lyric to "too long we've been rusting".

== See also ==
- Idiot plot
- Continuity (fiction)
- Deus ex machina
- Retroactive continuity
