= Marvel 1985 =

American comic book limited series

- "Side-by-side" covers of Marvel 1985 #1. Art by Jim Cheung.

Publication information
- Publisher: Marvel Comics
- Schedule: Monthly
- Format: Limited series
- Genre: Superhero
- Publication date: July–December 2008
- No. of issues: 6

Creative team
- Written by: Mark Millar
- Artist: Tommy Lee Edwards
- Letterer: John Workman
- Colorist: Tommy Lee Edwards
- Editor(s): John Barber; Michael Horwitz; Joe Quesada

Collected editions
- Hardcover: ISBN 0-7851-2158-7

Marvel 1985 (written on the cover as simply 1985) is a six-issue American comic book limited series, published in 2008 by Marvel Comics. It was written by Mark Millar and illustrated by Tommy Lee Edwards. The comic's premise is that heroes and villains from the Marvel Universe show up in the real world, thanks to a malevolent mutant boy with reality warping powers.

== Plot ==
Issue 1

A boy named Toby Goodman recently started reading Secret Wars comics. His parents are divorced, he is ostracized by his classmates and does not have many friends. Toby is seen walking home with his father Jerry when he thinks that he sees the Red Skull in the window of a house. Toby is reluctant to tell anyone about his discovery, but then he sees the Vulture on the television. Toby revisits the house where he saw the Red Skull and finds Doctor Doom and Mole Man talking about taking over the world. Doom hears Toby and orders his minions to chase after him. Toby runs away into the woods and trips over the Hulk.

Issue 2

The Hulk tells Toby his mind is currently that of Bruce Banner and that he was pulled into this world by an unknown force. Just then, the Juggernaut comes out from the woods, and attacks the Hulk. The resulting devastation prompts Toby to run away. Meanwhile, Toby's dad goes to an assisted living home to see Clyde Wyncham, a catatonic man whose house is the one in which the Marvel villains were seen. Clyde is Toby's father's childhood friend. Toby finds his father and tells him about the Hulk. His father responds to by saying he should not go near the Wyncham house again, and that he should not tell anyone about what happened, because "People won't want to hear it ...Believe me". When Toby comes home, his mother and stepfather tell him that his stepfather is up for a job in England, and if he gets it, they will move. Finally, the Stilt-Man is seen walking by Toby's dad's house, and Sandman and Electro attack a couple at their home, one of whom was the nurse at Wyncham's nursing home.

Issue 3

Toby and his father attempt to escape in his father's van which is attacked by the Lizard. Other characters like MODOK and Fin Fang Foom appear throughout the city as the military begins to evacuate civilians while trying to fight Abomination, Blob, Mandarin, Molten Man, Morbius, and Sauron.

Issue 4

Rather than leave, Toby runs back to the old Wyncham house, where he finds a portal to the Marvel Universe. The Trapster discovers him and Toby leaps through the portal, lands in the middle of New York City and shouts "Call the Avengers, there's an emergency."

Issue 5

The Trapster quickly pursues Toby, but is struck by a car just before shooting the boy. Toby makes his way to the Avengers Mansion, only to be patronized and sent on his way by Edwin Jarvis, who says "Parallel worlds fall under the Fantastic Four's jurisdiction". Taking Jarvis' advice, he attempts to enlist the Fantastic Four in saving his world, only to be told to wait his turn as there is a line to see them. Finally, he visits the office of the Daily Bugle where he lures Peter Parker to the roof. He tells Parker he knows his identity along with details of his personal life. Almost immediately, Toby loses his footing and is saved from a fatal fall by Spider-Man. Meanwhile, Toby's father narrowly saves his ex-wife from an encounter with Wendigo. As they escape in a van, Galactus looks over the city and declares: "I hunger".

Issue 6

Galactus is shown towering over the city, firing a destructive eye beam. Jerry warns Julie that Galactus plans to suck the earth dry with an elemental converter. The Lizard surrounds their van along with other villains, including Mole Man, and identifies the confused Jerry Goodman by name. Just as Doctor Octopus' tentacle breaks through the windshield and grabs Jerry by his throat, Captain America's flying shield slices it off. Toby is shown, returned from the Marvel Universe, with the Avengers assembled behind him. As the heroes and villains fight, Toby reunites with his mother and Jerry reveals that it is time to "finish this".

In a flashback to 20 years prior, Clyde Wyncham's mother blames Jerry for people being hypnotized and the death of Clyde's father. When Clyde admits to her that he is a mutant with reality-altering mind powers, she knocks him in the head with a candlestick, causing severe mental damage. While Clyde recovers in a nursing home, his comics are taken away. He loses his temper and summons the super villains to teach people a lesson. Jerry tries to reason with Clyde, but before Clyde can react, Red Skull shoots Jerry. Clyde screams "Enough!" and banishes the villains to where they came from. With the fight over and the asylum closed, Captain America offers to take Clyde with him to the Marvel Universe.

Moving ahead in time, Toby is revealed as the author. With his creative power, Toby ensures that his father did not die earlier. Instead, Toby admits him to a hospital in the Marvel Universe under the care of Donald Blake, where he scores a date with his childhood crush, Jane Foster. Jerry recollects how things turned out, thanks to his son, and there is nothing else left to say other than "Excelsior".

== Collected editions ==
The series has been collected into a single volume:

- Marvel 1985 (February 2009, Marvel Comics, ISBN 0-7851-2158-7, Panini Comics, softcover, 172 pages, ISBN 1-84653-406-2)
