= Mike Allred =

American comic book artist and writer

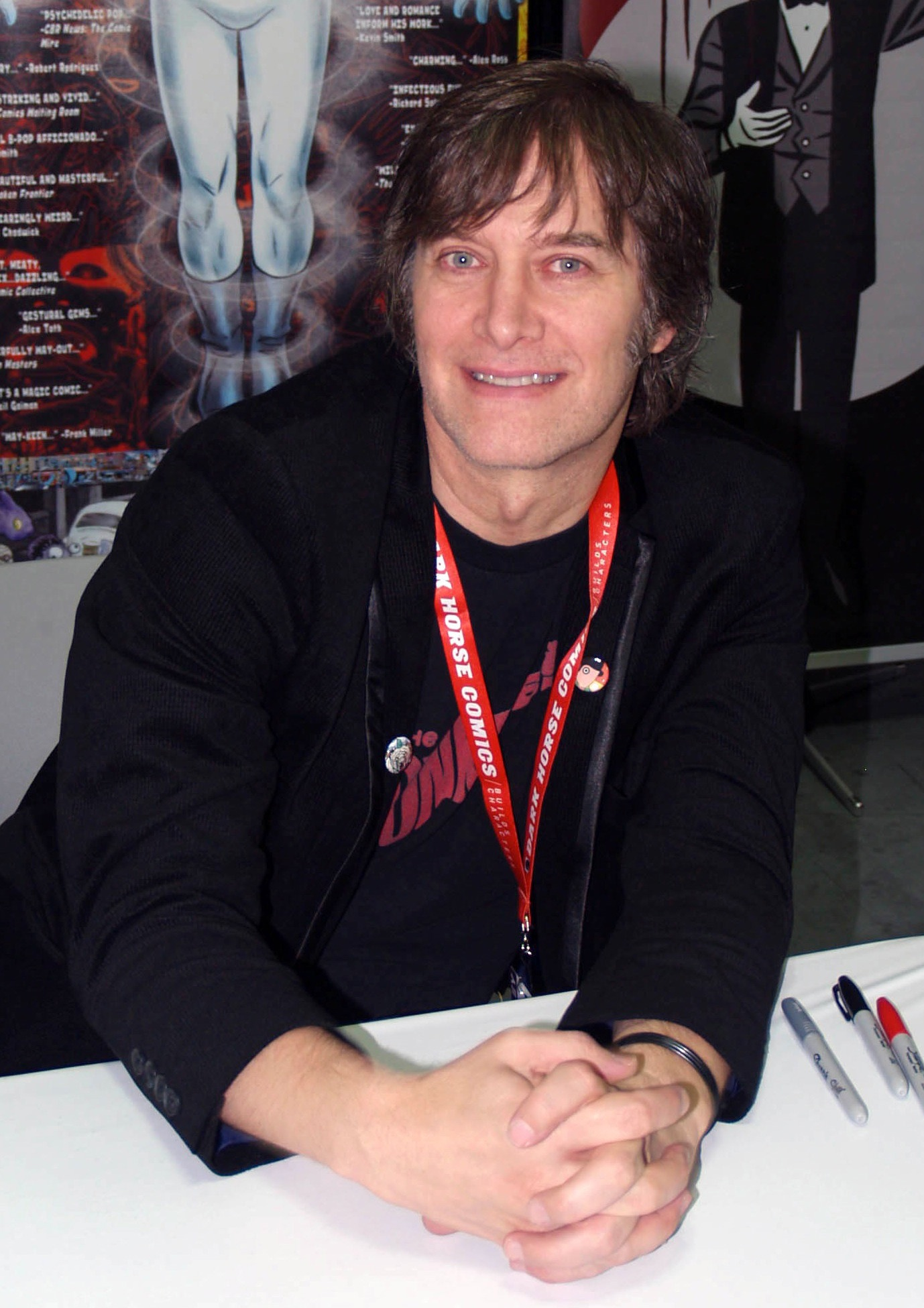
- Allred in 2014
- Born: Michael Dalton Allred; 1962 (age 63–64) Roseburg, Oregon, U.S.
- Pseudonym: Doc
- Notable works: Madman; X-Statix; iZombie
- Awards: Inkpot Award
- Spouse: Laura Bradford (m. 1981)

Michael Dalton "Mike" Allred (born 1962) is an American comic book artist and writer. He is most well known for his independent comics creation Madman and for co-creating and drawing the comic book series iZombie. His work often draws upon pop art, as well as commercial and comic art of the 1950s and 1960s.

== Early life ==
Michael Dalton Allred was born in 1962 in Roseburg, Oregon. His father, Dale Leroy Allred (May 20, 1926 – October 5, 2007), was born in Portland, Oregon. He was a psychologist and professor at Umpqua Community College and the University of Oregon, and received a Doctor of Philosophy in 1959 at Purdue University. Allred's mother, RaeBell Jenkins (née Bird; July 19, 1934 – February 17, 2014), was born in Bluebell, Utah. The two married in December 1951 in Salt Lake City, Utah. In 1973, Allred's parents divorced, and he stayed with his father in Eugene, Oregon, while his brothers and mother moved to Utah. In 1980, he attended Ricks College as an art major but switched to broadcasting fearing that he could not make a living as an artist.

== Career ==
Mike Allred began his career as a radio host on KYES AM 950 (KY95) in Roseburg, Oregon. He later became a television reporter in Europe, and started drawing comics in 1989 with the 104-page graphic novel Dead Air (Slave Labor Graphics). The story loosely followed his stint in radio as a sidebar to the true focus of the novel, the effects of post-nuclear war over a small Oregon town. He followed this up with his similarly titled works Graphique Musique (1990) and Grafik Muzik (Caliber Comics 1990–1991), in which he set out the style that he was to become known for with his most famous character, Madman.

Madman first appeared as Frank Einstein in Creatures of the Id and Grafik Muzik published in 1990, but it was not until March 1992 that the first Madman miniseries debuted from Tundra Publishing in March 1992. The series gained further recognition with its move to Dark Horse Comics in April 1994, where it was relaunched as Madman Comics and went on to be nominated for several Harvey Awards. Madman Comics ran for 20 issues and ended in 2000. From 2007 to 2009, Image Comics published Madman: Atomic Comics for 17 issues.

Allred drew part of the 1993 "Worlds' End" story arc in Neil Gaiman's The Sandman series.

Allred appeared as himself in the 1997 feature film Chasing Amy as part of the opening scene at a comic book convention, signing copies of his comic Madman. He also provides the artwork for the fictional comic book Bluntman and Chronic.

Allred himself gained further mainstream attention with the science-fiction/rock-and-roll comic Red Rocket 7 (Dark Horse, 1997) and his art for writer Peter Milligan's series X-Force, which he began drawing in July 2001, and subsequently became X-Statix. In 2000, AAA Pop published Allred's The Atomics, featuring a group of beatniks with superpowers. Issue #116 of X-Force, the first collaboration between Allred and Milligan, was the first Marvel comic book to not have the Comics Code Authority stamp of approval since 1971.

In 2004 and 2005, Allred wrote and drew The Golden Plates, an adaptation of the Book of Mormon. Allred is a Latter-Day Saint, and completed much of the work on this project in collaboration with his wife Laura Allred.

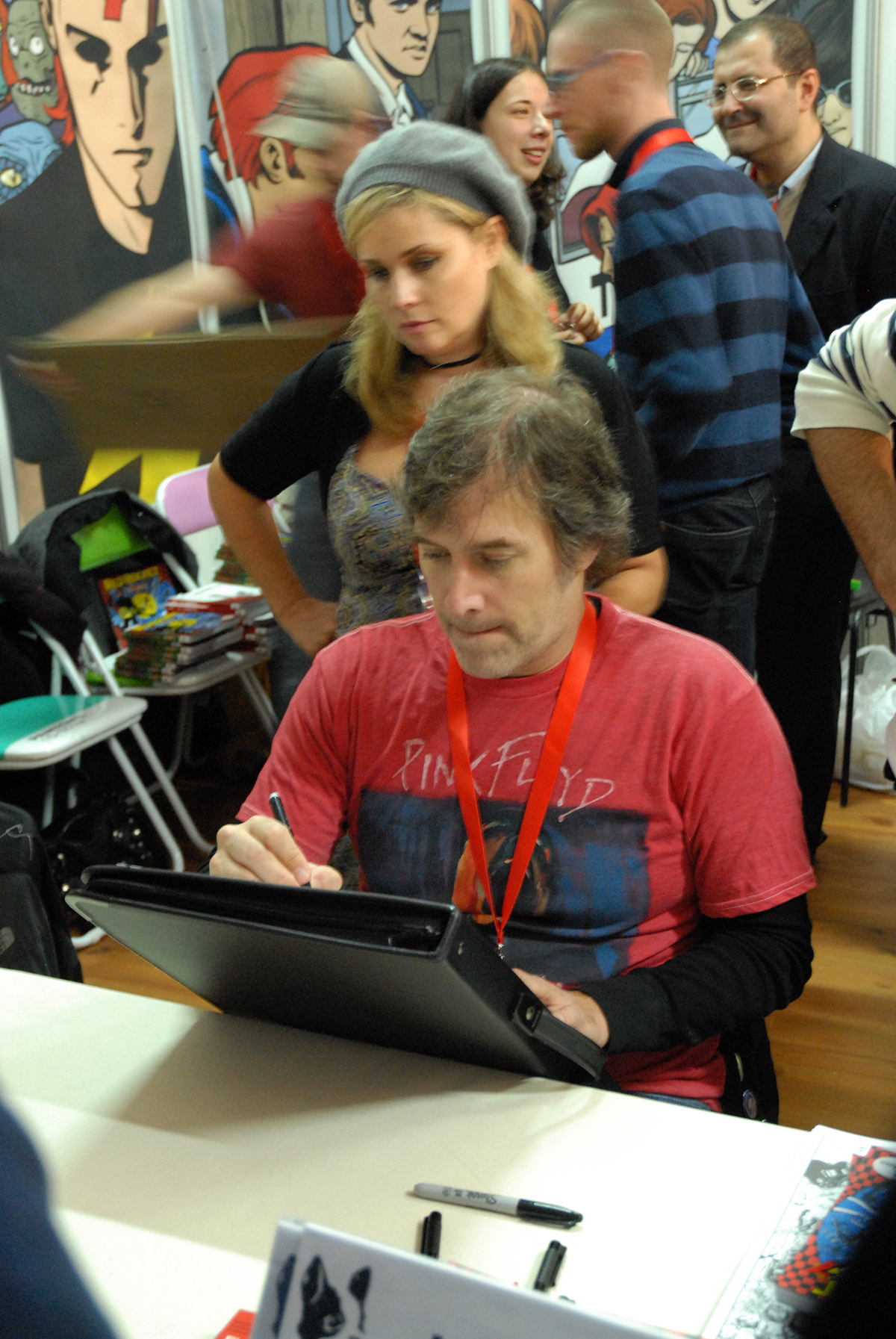
Allred sketching in 2010

Allred worked again with Neil Gaiman in 2009 on the Metamorpho feature in Wednesday Comics. The Madman All-New Giant-Size Super-Ginchy Special! was published in April 2011. Allred and writer Matt Fraction crafted a Fantastic Four spinoff series, FF, in 2013. The following year, Allred and writer Dan Slott launched a new Silver Surfer series at Marvel. His comic book series iZombie, which ran from 2010 to 2012, was adapted into a 2015 television series of the same name. Allred drew the 1960s variant cover for Action Comics #1000 (June 2018).

His wife, Laura, frequently works as his colorist. Allred worked with Mark Russell on the Superman: Space Age (2022) and Batman: Dark Age (2024) series.

== Personal life ==
Allred was raised as a member of the Church of Jesus Christ of Latter-day Saints. He considers himself a Mormon, though a liberal-leaning one, and has stated that he still identifies with the beliefs. Allred considers the Book of Mormon to be a phenomenal and fascinating story, irrespective of its factual accuracy.

== Awards ==
Allred's retro-styled artwork is a frequent nominee for comics awards such as the Harveys, the Eisners, and the Eagles. In his career, he has received:

- 2005 Special AML Award for The Golden Plates
- 2009 Inkpot Award
- 2011 AML Award in the category of "Special Award in Graphical Narrative" for a lifetime of comic art
- 2015 The television adaptation of his Vertigo comic book series iZombie was the recipient of the Best New Fandom award at the 2015 MTV Fandom Awards
- 2016 The Eisner Award for Best Single Issue/One Shot (Silver Surfer #11)
- 2021 The Eisner Award for Best Penciller/Inker (Bowie: Stardust, Rayguns and Moonage Daydreams)

== Bibliography ==
- Dead Air (Slave Labor Graphics, 1989)
- Graphique Musique #1–3 (Slave Labor Graphics, 1989–1990)
- Creatures Of The Id #1 (Caliber Press, 1990)
- Grafik Muzik #1–4 (Caliber Press, 1990–1991)
- The Everyman (Epic Comics, 1991)
- Madman #1–3 (Tundra Publishing, 1992)
- Madman Adventures #1–3 (Tundra Publishing, 1992–1993)
- Vertigo Visions: The Geek #1 (DC Comics/Vertigo, 1993)
- Vertical (DC Comics/Vertigo, 1993, with writer Steven T. Seagle)
- Vertigo Jam #1 (DC Comics/Vertigo, 1993)
- Sandman #54 (DC Comics/Vertigo, 1993, with writer Neil Gaiman)
- Madman Comics #1–20 (Dark Horse Comics, 1994–2000)
- Untold Tales of Spider-Man '96 #1 (Marvel Comics, 1996)
- Superman/Madman Hullabaloo #1–3 (DC Comics/Dark Horse Comics, 1997)
- Red Rocket 7 #1–7 (Dark Horse Comics, 1997–1998)
- Feeders #1 (Dark Horse Comics, 1999)
- The Atomics #1–15 (AAA Pop, 2000–2001)
- Superman and Batman: World's Funnest #1 (DC Comics, 2001)
- Green Lantern/Superman: Legend of the Green Flame #1 (DC Comics, 2001)
- X-Force #116–123, 125-128 (Marvel Comics, 2001–2002, with writer Peter Milligan)
- Ultimate Marvel Team-Up #4–5 (Marvel Comics, 2001)
- Catwoman vol. 3 #1–4 (inker) (DC Comics, 2002)
- Just Imagine Stan Lee with Chris Bachalo Creating Catwoman #1 (inker) (DC Comics, 2002)
- X-Statix #1–4, 6–9, 11–19, 21–26 (Marvel Comics, 2002–2004, with writer Peter Milligan)
- Vertigo X Anniversary Preview #1 (DC Comics, 2003)
- The Golden Plates #1-3 (AAA Pop, 2004-2005)
- Solo #7 (DC Comics, 2005)
- Madman Atomic Comics #1–17 (Image Comics, 2007–2009)
- Fables #76 (DC Comics, 2008, with writer Bill Willingham)
- Wednesday Comics #1–12 (Metamorpho) (DC Comics, 2009, with writer Neil Gaiman)
- Nation X #1 and 4 (Marvel Comics, 2009–2010)
- iZombie #1–28 (Vertigo, 2010–2012)
- Daredevil vol. 3 #17 (2012)
- Wolverine and the X-Men #17 (2012)
- FF vol. 2 #1–5, 7-8, 10-16 (Marvel Comics, 2013-2014)
- Batman Black and White vol. 2 #4 (DC Comics, 2014)
- Silver Surfer vol. 7 #1–15 (Marvel Comics, 2014–2016)
- Art Ops #1–5, 8, 12 (DC Comics/Vertigo, 2015–2016)
- Silver Surfer vol. 8 #1–14 (Marvel Comics, 2016–2017)
- Bug!: The Adventures of Forager #1–6 (Young Animal, 2017)
- Batman '66 Meets the Legion of Super-Heroes #1 (DC Comics, 2017)
- Infinity Countdown: Adam Warlock #1 (Marvel Comics, 2018)
- Peter Parker: The Spectacular Spider-Man Annual #1 (Marvel Comics, 2018)
- Giant-Size X-Statix #1 (Marvel Comics, 2019, with writer Peter Milligan)
- Amazing Spider-Man: Full Circle #1 (Marvel Comics, 2019, with various writers and artists)
- Bowie: Stardust, Rayguns and Moonage Daydreams (Insight Comics, 2020)
- X-Ray Robot #1–4 (Dark Horse Comics, 2020)
- X-Cellent #1–5 (Marvel Comics, 2022, with writer Peter Milligan)
- The X-Cellent #1–5 (Marvel Comics, 2023, with writer Peter Milligan)
- Superman: Space Age #1-3 (DC Black Label, 2022–23)
- Batman: Dark Age #1-6 (DC Black Label, 2024)

=== Covers only ===
- Caliber Presents #15 (Caliber Comics, 1990)
- Cheval Noir #39 (Dark Horse Comics, 1993)
- The Comics Journal #164 (Fantagraphics Books, 1993)
- Hero Illustrated Special Edition #2 (Warrior Publications, 1994)
- Classic Star Wars: The Early Adventures #1 (Dark Horse Comics, 1994)
- Dark Horse Presents #100–0, 100–5 (Dark Horse Comics, 1995)
- Heartbreakers #3 (Dark Horse Comics, 1996)
- Jay & Silent Bob #2 (Oni Press, 1998)
- Vertigo: Winter's Edge #2 (DC Comics/Vertigo, 1999)
- Empty Love Stories #2 (Funny Valentine Press, 1999)
- Oni Press Summer Vacation Supercolor Fun Special #1 (Oni Press, 2000)
- Comicology #2 (TwoMorrows Publishing, 2000)
- Oni Press Color Special #1–2 (Oni Press, 2001–2002)
- Madman Picture Exhibition #4 (AAA Pop Comics, 2002)
- X-Statix #20 (Marvel Comics, 2004)
- Spider-Man Unlimited vol. 2 #6 (Marvel Comics, 2005)
- Marvel Knights 4 #23–24 (Marvel Comics, 2005–2006)
- X-Statix Presents: Dead Girl #1–5 (Marvel Comics, 2006)
- Kabuki #9 (Icon Comics, 2007)
- Spider-Man Fairy Tales #4 (Marvel Comics, 2007)
- Popgun Volume 1 (Image Comics, 2007)
- The Perhapanauts Annual #1 (Image Comics, 2008)
- Jersey Gods #1, 4, 6–10, 12 (Image Comics, 2009–2010)
- Rapture #3 (Dark Horse Comics, 2009)
- Fractured Fables gn (Silverline Books, 2010)
- Captain Action Season 2 #1 (Moonstone Books, 2010)
- Teen Titans #86 (DC Comics, 2010)
- glamourpuss #19 (Aardvark-Vanaheim, 2011)
- iZombie #12, 18, 21, 24 (DC Comics/Vertigo, 2011–2012)
- The Next Issue Project #3 (Image Comics, 2011)
- Star Trek/Legion of Super-Heroes #5 (IDW Publishing, 2012)
- It Girl! and the Atomics #1–12 (Image Comics, 2012–2013)
- Before Watchmen: Silk Spectre #3 (DC Comics, 2012)
- Happy! #1 (Image, 2012)
- Mars Attacks The Real Ghostbusters #1 (IDW Publishing, 2012)
- Batman '66 #1–3, 5, 7 (DC Comics, 2013–2014)
- All New Doop #1 (Marvel Comics, 2014)
- Batman '66 Meets Steed And Mrs Peel #1-6 (DC Comics, 2016)
- Booster Gold/The Flintstones Special #1 (DC Comics, 2017)
- Action Comics #1000 variant (DC Comics, 2018)
- Dick Tracy: Dead or Alive #1-4 (IDW Publishing, 2018-2019)

=== Other work ===
==== As artist ====
- Mallrats (1995) (opening sequence)
- Chasing Amy (1997) (Bluntman and Chronic artwork)
- The Faculty (1998) (logo for The Hornets football team)
- Ingredients the Band – Bears Driving Trains (2006) (album cover)
- Skyscape – Zetacarnosa (2009) (album cover)
- iZombie (TV series) (2014) (title sequence intro)
- Christmas Party (2018) (The Monkees album cover)

==== As writer ====
- Astroesque (1996)
- G-Men from Hell (2000)

==== As musician ====
- The Gear – Son of Red Rocket Seven (1998)
- The Gear – Left Of Center Of The Universe (2009)

Preceded by Jorge Lucas	X-Force artist 2001–2002	Succeeded by n/a
