= Bullet Points (comics) =

Marvel Comics miniseries

- Cover of Bullet Points #1 (January 2007), art by Tommy Lee Edwards.

Publication information
- Publisher: Marvel Comics
- Schedule: Monthly
- Format: Limited series
- Publication date: January 2007 - May 2007
- No. of issues: 5
- Main character: See Characters

Creative team
- Written by: J. Michael Straczynski
- Penciller: Tommy Lee Edwards

Bullet Points is a comic book limited series that was published by Marvel Comics in 2006 and 2007, written by J. Michael Straczynski, illustrated by Tommy Lee Edwards and lettered by John Workman.

The series was released under the Marvel Knights imprint and examines the consequences to the Marvel Universe when Steve Rogers is not injected with the Super-Soldier Serum but instead becomes Iron Man. The series also swaps the super-powered alter-egos Peter Parker and Bruce Banner develop, with the former becoming the Hulk and the latter Spider-Man.

== Plot summary ==
Cover to Bullet Points #2.

The series begins on December 8, 1940. Abraham Erskine and Benjamin Parker are killed by Heinz Kruger before they can use the Super-Soldier Serum as part of Project: Rebirth. Due to Parker and Erskine's deaths, Project: Rebirth is canceled. The US government activates Project: Iron Man and asks Steve Rogers to participate in it. Steve accepts and is bonded to the Iron Man armor. Iron Man debuts during the Battle of Guadalcanal, going on to help win World War II. Rogers goes on to become an essential part of American military tactics over the resulting decades, drafting Reed Richards to provide technical support.

Benjamin's nephew Peter Parker becomes a disaffected, trouble-making punk without a parental figure to guide him. He decides to sneak out of a field trip to a desert base and goes joyriding with friends in a stolen jeep. After the jeep breaks down, Peter goes off to find fuel, but accidentally wanders into a test site as a gamma bomb is detonated. Soon after recovering from the explosion and returning home, Peter is confronted by the two friends, who accuse him of getting them into trouble. Peter becomes angry and turns into the Hulk, destroying property around him. The Hulk is confronted by the police. May Parker recognizes the Hulk as Peter and suffers a heart attack, which causes him to flee in distress.

As a result of Peter's transformation, the recently retired Steve Rogers is drafted back to wear the Iron Man armor to capture Peter. After visiting May in hospital to say goodbye before running away, Peter is confronted by Iron Man and several army troops. Rejecting Rogers's attempts to calm him, Peter turns into the Hulk and confronts Iron Man. After a long fight outside the hospital, the Hulk eventually kills Iron Man; realizing what he has done, Peter flees in terror.

Meanwhile, Reed Richards, along with his co-pilots Ben Grimm, Susan Storm, and Johnny Storm, launch into space in a rocket designed to collect cosmic rays. However, the rocket is sabotaged and explodes before it can reach orbit. The ensuing crash kills Ben, Johnny, and Susan, with Reed being the only survivor. Reed is invited to lead the spy organization S.H.I.E.L.D. As head of S.H.I.E.L.D., Reed uses his technical genius and scientific background to pioneer numerous radical technologies and also drafts others, including Bruce Banner, Stephen Strange, and Tony Stark, into the organization.

Blaming himself and his gamma bomb for Peter's condition, Bruce Banner begins to obsessively research methods of curing Peter. During one of his experiments, he is bitten by a radioactive spider collected from the gamma bomb test site and mutates into a feral spider creature. After going on the run for two years, Bruce is captured and becomes Spider-Man after having his mutation brought under control.

Galactus arrives on Earth alongside his herald the Silver Surfer, intending to consume the planet as he has consumed others over the millennia. The US Army and Air Force are wiped out as they confront the Silver Surfer. Earth's superhumans attempt to stop Galactus, only to be killed or injured en masse, with only a few managing to come through the battle unscathed. The Hulk emerges from seclusion, attacks Galactus, and dies after being blasted by the Power Cosmic. Peter's death inspires the Silver Surfer to attack Galactus, who eventually leaves Earth after killing the Silver Surfer.

== Characters ==
- Iron Man (Steve Rogers): Soldier in World War II who volunteers for Project: Iron Man. He dies after attempting to subdue and arrest the Hulk.
- Hulk (Peter Parker): Exposed to gamma bomb who turns into the Hulk whenever angry. He runs away after accidentally killing Iron Man. He later emerges from seclusion and dies while attacking Galactus.
- Reed Richards: Government scientist working on "Project: Iron Man", is director of S.H.I.E.L.D. after the crash landing of his rocket and the deaths of the co-pilots. He resembles Nick Fury in appearance.
- Spider-Man (Bruce Banner): S.H.I.E.L.D. scientist who is bitten by a radioactive spider and gains spider-like abilities.

== See also ==
- JLA: The Nail, a DC Comics miniseries with a similar concept.
- What If... Captain Carter Were the First Avenger?, a What If... episode where Peggy Carter receives the serum instead while Steve Rogers utilizes a Hydra Stomper armor
