= John Workman =

American comic book letterer

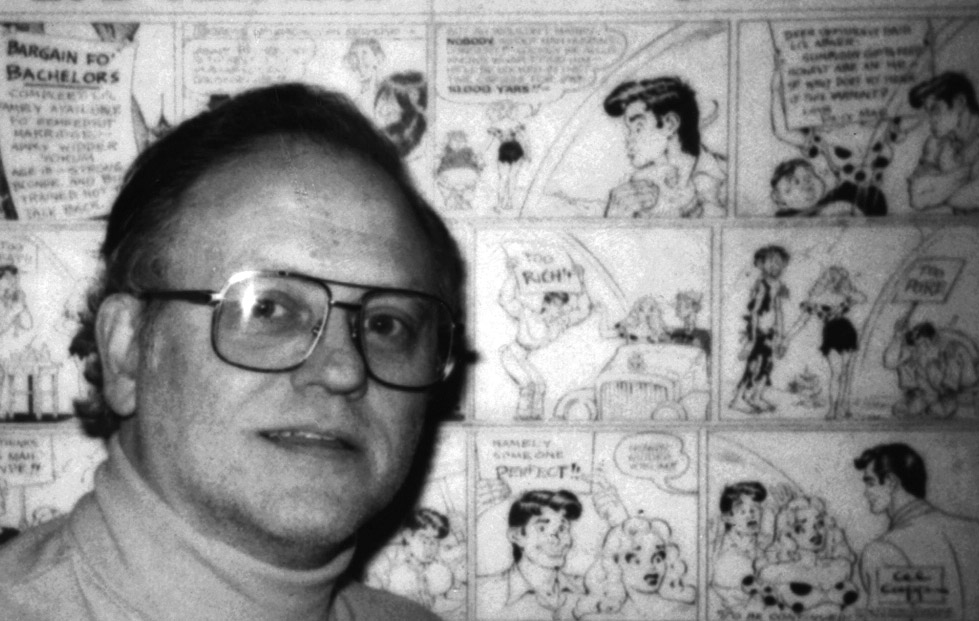
- Workman in front of a Li'l Abner page in his studio
- Born: John Elbert Workman Jr. June 20, 1950 (age 76) Beckley, West Virginia
- Areas: Letterer, Writer, Artist, Designer
- Pseudonyms: E. L. Bert, W.H. Pratt, J. P. Patches, John-Boy Waltonman, Vertig
- Notable works: Thor; Doom Patrol; Heavy Metal; Wild Things
- Awards: CBG Fan Award, 2005; Harvey Award for Lettering 2009, 2011, 2016; Society of Illustrators Certificates for Merit, Editorial 1980, 1982; Society for News Design, Magazines, Award for Excellence 2006

John Workman (born June 20, 1950) is an American editor, writer, artist, designer, colorist and letterer in the comic book industry. He is known for his frequent partnerships with writer/artist Walter Simonson and also for lettering the entire run of Grant Morrison/Rachel Pollack's Doom Patrol (DC Comics).

Born in Beckley, West Virginia, Workman spent the first eight years of his life in Glen Rogers, West Virginia and Darlington, Maryland. Inspired by the George Reeves Superman TV series, he began writing short stories and drawing pictures. Living in Aberdeen, Washington, he studied art and journalism at Grays Harbor College and Clark College, receiving an Associate in Arts degree from Grays Harbor in 1970.

== Career ==
Working in and around the Aberdeen area from 1967 to 1975, Workman created local and regional advertising, always attempting to do the ad work in comics form whenever he was allowed to do so. He also did comics fanzine work, writing and drawing for several different publications, including fanzines overseen by Rick Spanier (Assorted Superlatives) and by Mark Wheatley. In 1968, he met gag cartoonist Carl Stamwitz who had worked for Marvel Comics in their humor magazines. He was further encouraged when he met and had numerous conversations with the legendary writer-artist Basil Wolverton in 1969.

He got his start in comics publishing on a national level in 1972 by writing and drawing two four-page comics features, "Sindy" and "The Fallen Angels", that appeared for three years in two California-based men's magazines published by Archie Comics alumnus Ed Goldstein. Using different pseudonyms (one being E. L. Bert), Workman also wrote short prose stories that appeared in the magazines alongside stories by Harlan Ellison and Robert Bloch. Two years later, in the pages of Mike Friedrich's Star*Reach, he wrote, penciled, inked and lettered stories for the seminal fantasy/science fiction comics anthology. Workman's work on Star*Reach attracted attention from DC Comics, and they offered him a production job in 1975.

Workman was art director of Heavy Metal magazine from 1977 to 1984. His comics art, writing, lettering, coloring and design work are evident throughout issues from that period.

=== Lettering ===
From 1977 to 1983, Workman lettered comics occasionally (mostly for DC); he has been working steadily as a freelance letterer since 1983. Some of the regular titles he has lettered include First Comics' Grimjack from 1984 to 1987, Marvel's Fantastic Four from 1985 to 1989, Cosmic Odyssey in 1988–1989, Fantastic Force from 1994 to 1996, The Incredible Hulk from 1997 to 1999, and Spider-Girl from 2000 to 2002.

For DC Comics, Workman lettered Doom Patrol from 1987 to 1995, the Legion of Super-Heroes from 1991 to 1993, Michael Moorcock's Multiverse in 1997–1998, and Aquaman in 1999–2000.

Workman handled lettering chores for Topps Comics' X-Files titles in the late 1990s, and Image Comics' Savage Dragon from 2003 to 2005. Since 2003, he has done a lot of lettering work for Archie Comics, especially for their Sonic the Hedgehog and Mega Man titles. He has created logos for many of their super-hero characters and has done interior lettering on both New Crusaders and The Fox.

==== Walt Simonson ====
Workman has worked on many of Walt Simonson's projects, including Thor (Marvel, 1983–1987), Balder the Brave (Marvel, 1985), Jurassic Park (Topps, 1993), Robocop vs. Terminator, Star Slammers (Bravura/Malibu, 1994), Orion (DC, 2000–2002), and "Ragnarok".

==== Tommy Lee Edwards ====
Workman has lettered much of the Marvel, DC and Wildstorm work of Tommy Lee Edwards, including Gemini Blood (1996–1997), The Question (2005), Bullet Points (2007), Turf, Marvel 1985 (2008) for which he won the 2009 Harvey Award for lettering, and DC's "Mother Panic" (2016)".

=== Writing, artwork and design ===
In addition to the thousands of comics pages that he has lettered, Workman has also written or drawn for DC Comics, Marvel Comics, Archie Comics, National Lampoon, Playboy, Hamilton Publishing, Image Comics, and others. He wrote an introduction and the final chapter in Bhob Stewart's Against the Grain: Mad Artist Wallace Wood and contributed a short autobiographical piece in comics form to the TwoMorrows book Streetwise. Working in an art style similar to that of artist Mike Sekowsky, he pencilled and inked three of the dust jackets for the hardcover DC Comics Justice League Archives series.

He wrote and drew the 41-page "Adventures of Roma" which ran in consecutive issues of Dark Horse Presents in 1987. Workman's early science fiction and girlie-humor strips "Sindy" and "The Fallen Angels" were collected in a five-issue run by Forbidden Fruit, an imprint of Apple Comics. Wild Things, a three-issue series published by Metro Comics, was made up mostly of material created by Workman for such diverse publications as Star*Reach and Heavy Metal. In July 2013, a reformatted graphic novel version of "The Adventures of Roma" with new art and additional story material was published in both hardbound and softcover editions by CO_{2} Comics.

For the Fantagraphics imprint Eros Comix, Workman wrote and designed Betty Being Bad (1990), a 48-page booklet about pin-up model Betty Page. He also wrote and designed two hardcovers for Heavy Metal Books, Heavy Metal: 25 Years of Classic Covers and Innocent Images. A self-published booklet,"The Comic Book Crisis", which examined the business side of comic books was incorporated (with additional new material) into issue 199 of The Comics Journal, featuring commentary by Mike Friedrich, Steve Geppi, Kurt Busiek, Gary Groth and others.

Through his own Neonarcheos Publishing imprint, Workman has published limited editions of "Writing, Penciling, Inking, Lettering, Editing Martelaine," "The Third Man", "The Art of John Workman", and both black-and-white and color posters of pages of his artwork.

== Lettering style ==
Workman is noted for his distinct lettering style, tight craftsmanship, and the fact that for the most part he still does traditional lettering on art boards instead of using the computer and digital fonts. One of Workman's lettering trademarks is to often erase or omit panel borders when they touch the top, side or bottom of a word balloon or caption, thus opening up the balloon/caption to the gutter. In this regard, Workman's lettering style is similar to that of the late Bill Oakley. Workman's lettering style was highly influenced by the lettering of Jean "Moebius" Giraud from the time when Moebius appeared regularly in the pages of Heavy Metal.

Because he does most of his lettering by hand, Workman's collaboration is sought by those artists who wish to have a more cohesive and integrated look to the final artwork. (A joke in the comic book community goes that "Comic books are the only place where having 'Workmanlike' craftsmanship is a plus.")

Workman later moved toward digital lettering. In addition to his "on-the-art boards work", Workman has been electronically hand-lettering by way of a WACOM tablet for such books as Torchwood, Mega Man, Thor, Turf, DC's "Before Watchmen" series Ozymandias, Superman: American Alien, and Batman.

== Personal life ==
Workman is married to the former Cathy Foster, whom he met at Aberdeen's Eaton's Bookstall when she was looking for issues of Lois Lane drawn by Kurt Schaffenberger, and the two have a daughter named Kate, a writer who is the author of two Sherlock Holmes novels. His brother Bill worked beside him on-staff at Heavy Metal magazine. Both were in the 2000 Jon Cryer film Went to Coney Island on a Mission from God... Be Back by Five.
