= Tommy Lee Edwards =

American illustrator

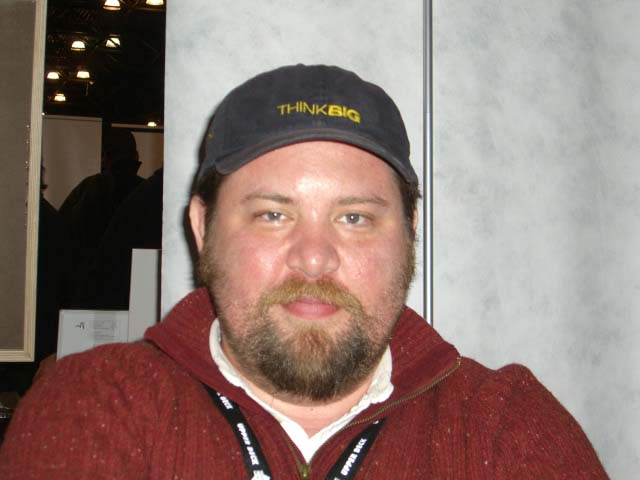
- Tommy Lee Edwards at the 2008 New York Comic Con
- Area: Artist

Tommy Lee Edwards is an American illustrator. Edwards's portfolio includes works created in the realm of comics, video games, books, advertising, film, and animation.

== Career ==
As well as comic-related work he has also worked on film projects, providing the style guides for films like Batman Begins, Superman Returns and Men in Black II as well as providing movie posters, illustrations for role-playing games and other promotional or licensing work.

Edwards's other projects include Marvel 1985, with writer Mark Millar, which Millar has said "is about the real world, the world we live in right now, dealing with the villains of the Marvel Universe finding us." He has also provided the art for Turf with Jonathan Ross. Edwards co-wrote a comic book series and made a short film for the multi-platform project Vandroid, published by Dark Horse Comics in 2014.

== Bibliography ==
=== Comics ===
- Eightball
- Batman
- Disavowed
- Hellboy
- The Invisibles
- Daredevil
- The Matrix
- Star Trek
- Gemini Blood (with Christopher Hinz, Helix, 1996–1997)
- ZombieWorld: Winter's Dregs (with Bob Fingerman, 4-issue mini-series, Dark Horse Comics, 1998, collected in tpb ZombieWorld: Winter's Dregs, 2005)
- The Question (with Rick Veitch, 6-issue mini-series, DC, 2005)
- Bullet Points (with J. Michael Straczynski, 5-issue mini-series, Marvel, 2006–2007)
- Marvel 1985 (with Mark Millar, Marvel, May 2008)
- Turf (with Jonathan Ross, limited series, Image Comics, 2010–2011)
- Vandroid with Noah Smith and Dan McDaid, 2014
- Mother Panic #1–12 with Jody Houser, 2017
- Mother Panic: Gotham A.D #1–6 with Jody Houser, 2018

=== Film-related ===
- The Book of Eli - Concept Artist
- Indiana Jones and the Kingdom of the Crystal Skull - Style-Guide and children's books
- Harry Potter and the Sorcerer's Stone - Style Guide
- Star Wars - RPG Core Rule Book, children's books, style guide, and Essential Guide books
- Batman Begins - Licensing Style-guide
- Dinotopia - Movie Promo and Style Guide
- Superman Returns - Style Guide
- Men in Black II - Style Guide
