= Laura Allred =

American comics artist

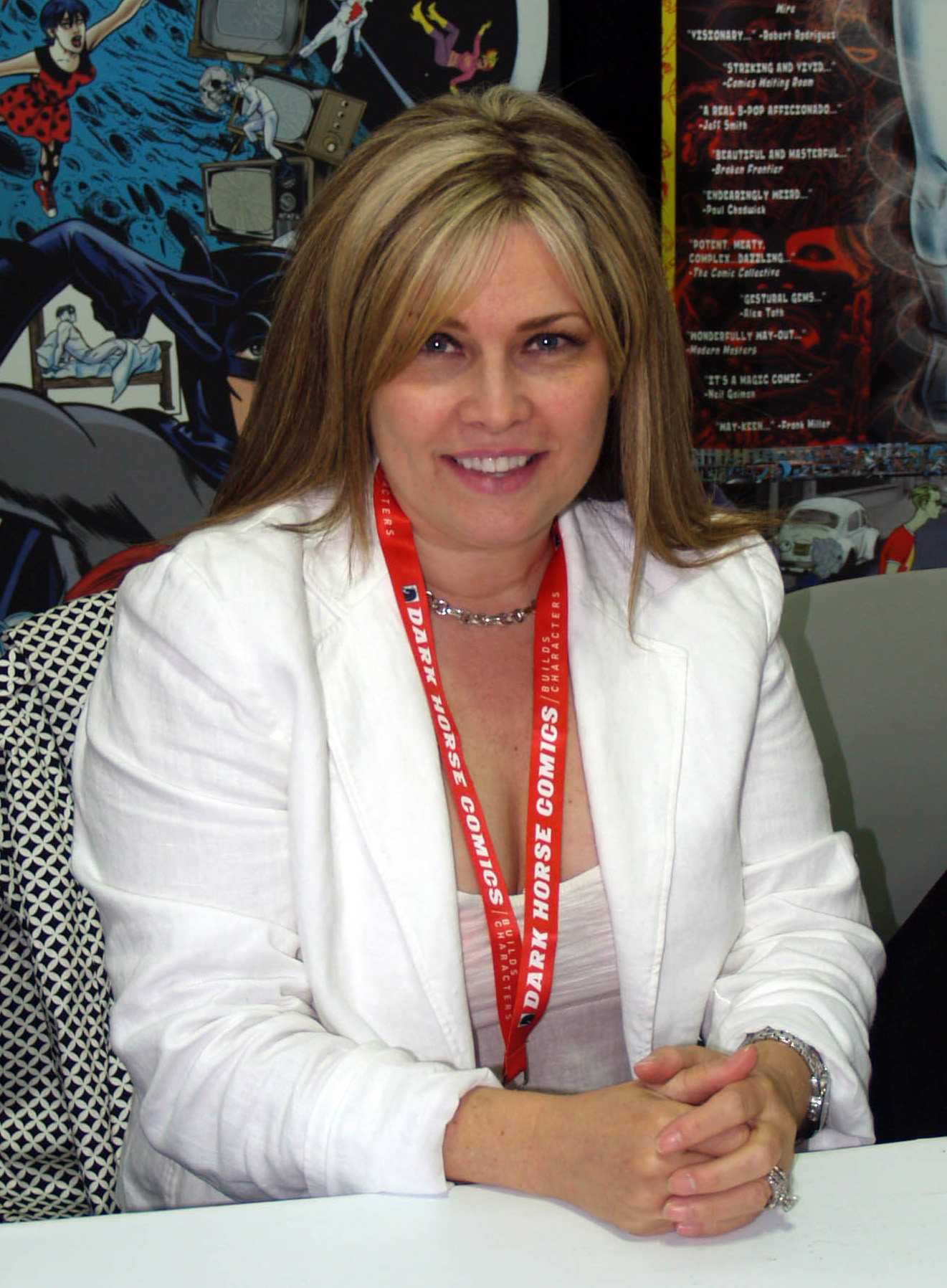
- Allred in 2014
- Area: Colourist
- Awards: "Favorite Colorist" Wizard Fan Awards (1995)

Laura Allred is an American comics artist who is best known for her work as a colorist with her husband, the writer/artist Mike Allred.

== Awards ==
- 1995: Won "Favorite Colorist" Wizard Fan Award
- 1998: Nominated for "Best Colorist" Eisner Award, for Red Rocket 7
- 2000: Nominated for "Best Colorist" Eisner Award, for Madman Comics and Happydale: Devils in the Desert
- 2005: Special AML Award with Mike Allred for The Golden Plates
- 2012: Won "Best Coloring" Eisner Award, for iZombie (Vertigo/DC Comics) and Madman All-New Giant-Size Super-Ginchy Special (Image Comics)
- 2016: Won "Best Colorist" Harvey Award, for Silver Surfer
- 2017: Finalist for an AML Award with Mike Allred and Lee Allred Batman '66 and Legion of Super Heroes #1
- 2019: Finalist for an AML Award with Mike Allred, Lee Allred, and Rich Tommaso for Dick Tracy: Dead or Alive
- 2021: Won "Best Coloring" Eisner Award, for Bowie: Stardust, Rayguns and Moonage Daydreams (Insight Comics) and X-Ray Robot (Dark Horse Comics)
