= Jupiter's Legacy =

Jupiter's Legacy may refer to:

- Jupiter's Legacy (comic) by Mark Millar, published by Image Comics in 2013
- Jupiter's Legacy (TV series), a 2021 Netflix series based on the comic
