= Cartoon studio =

Cartoon studio and similar may mean:

- Animation studio
- Comics studio

== Studios ==
- DisneyToon Studios, the direct-to-video cartoon studio for Walt Disney Corporation
- Metro-Goldwyn-Mayer cartoon studio, the MGM Studios cartoon studio
- Paramount Cartoon Studios, the Paramaout Studios cartoon studio
- Universal Cartoon Studios, the Universal Studios cartoon studio

== Other ==
- Toon Studio, a new land at Walt Disney Studios Park in Disneyland Paris, France
- The Simpsons: Cartoon Studio, a software program
- Kartoon Studios, American entertainment company

== See also ==
- Warner Bros. Cartoons and Warner Bros. Animation, the cartoon studios of Warner Bros. owned by Warner Bros. Discovery
- Walt Disney Animation Studios, the cartoon studio for Walt Disney Studios, owned by The Walt Disney Company
- Cartoon Network Studios, Cartoon Network's cartoon studios
- Cartoon Network Development Studio Europe
- Scottish Cartoon Art Studio
