= Jupiter's Legacy (comic) =

Superhero comic book

- Cover to issue #1 by Frank Quitely

Publication information
- Publisher: Image Comics (vol. 1–5); Dark Horse Comics (vol. 6: Finale)
- Schedule: Irregular
- Format: Limited series
- Genre: Superhero
- Publication date: (Legacy vol. 1 / vol. 3); April 2013 – January 2015; (Circle vol. 1 / Legacy vol. 1); April – September 2015; (Circle vol. 2 / Legacy vol. 2); November 2015 – May 2016; (Legacy vol. 2 / vol. 4); June 2016 – July 2017; (Requiem / vol. 5); June – December 2021; (Finale / vol. 6); October 2024 – March 2025
- No. of issues: (Legacy vol. 1 / vol. 3); 5 (#1–5); (Circle vol. 1 / Legacy vol. 1); 6 (#1–6); (Circle vol. 2 / Legacy vol. 2); 6 (#1–6); (Legacy vol. 2 / vol. 4); 5 (#1–5); (Requiem / vol. 5); 6 (#1–6); (Finale / vol. 6); 5 (#1–6)

Creative team
- Written by: Mark Millar
- Artist(s): Frank Quitely, Wilfredo Torres, Davide Gianfelice, Chris Sprouse, Tommy Lee Edwards, Ty Templeton
- Letterer: Peter Doherty
- Colorist: Peter Doherty

Jupiter's Legacy is an American superhero comic book series, first published in 2013, written by Mark Millar, drawn by Frank Quitely, colored and lettered by Peter Doherty and published by Image Comics. Published as a series of eponymous limited series and interstitial prequel miniseries, it is to date the longest series that Millar had published as part of his Millarworld line of creator-owned comics, spanning an issue run three times as long as his then-most recent series, Supercrooks and Nemesis. It was also the first collaboration between Millar and Quitely since their work on The Authority in 2001, and Quitely's first long-form work with a writer other than Grant Morrison.

The story, which is influenced by Star Wars, King Kong, Roman mythology and origin stories from the Golden Age of Comics, was written as Millar's treatise on superheroes' connection to the American ideal. The first few issues of the opening story arc explore the generational conflict between a group of aging superheroes known as the Union, who used the powers they gained in 1932 for the betterment of mankind, in particular their leader, Sheldon Sampson (also known as the Utopian), and their children, who are daunted by the prospect of living up to their parents' legacy. Other conflicts and themes in the book include sociopolitical and economic differences among the older heroes and the end of capitalism, in the form of Sheldon's differences with his brother, Walter, which were inspired by Millar's reaction to the Great Recession.

The series received generally positive reviews, with praise given to Millar's writing, Quitely's art and Peter Doherty's colors, though more than one reviewer regarded the series' take on realistic superheroes as derivative.

The series' storyline is further explored in the prequel series Jupiter's Circle, which depicts the lives of the six founding members of the Union in the 1950s and 1960s. The first volume of the prequel debuted in 2015, and the second in November 2015. The sequel series Jupiter's Legacy: Requiem, which continues the storyline decades after the end of the original series, debuted in June 2021, also yielding positive critical reception. Subsequently, both volumes of Jupiter's Circle were retroactively rebranded as Volumes 1 and 2 of Jupiter's Legacy, with the original two volumes rebranded as Volumes 3 and 4, Requiem rebranded as Volume 5, and the new Jupiter's Legacy: Finale closing off the series rebranded as Volume 6, published by Dark Horse Comics.

In April 2015, it was announced that Millar had partnered with film producer Lorenzo di Bonaventura to adapt Jupiter's Legacy into feature films. In 2018, it was announced that Netflix, which acquired Millarworld the previous year, was developing a television adaptation of the comic series, with Steven S. DeKnight hired as showrunner and one of the executive producers. The series lasted one season.

== Publication history ==
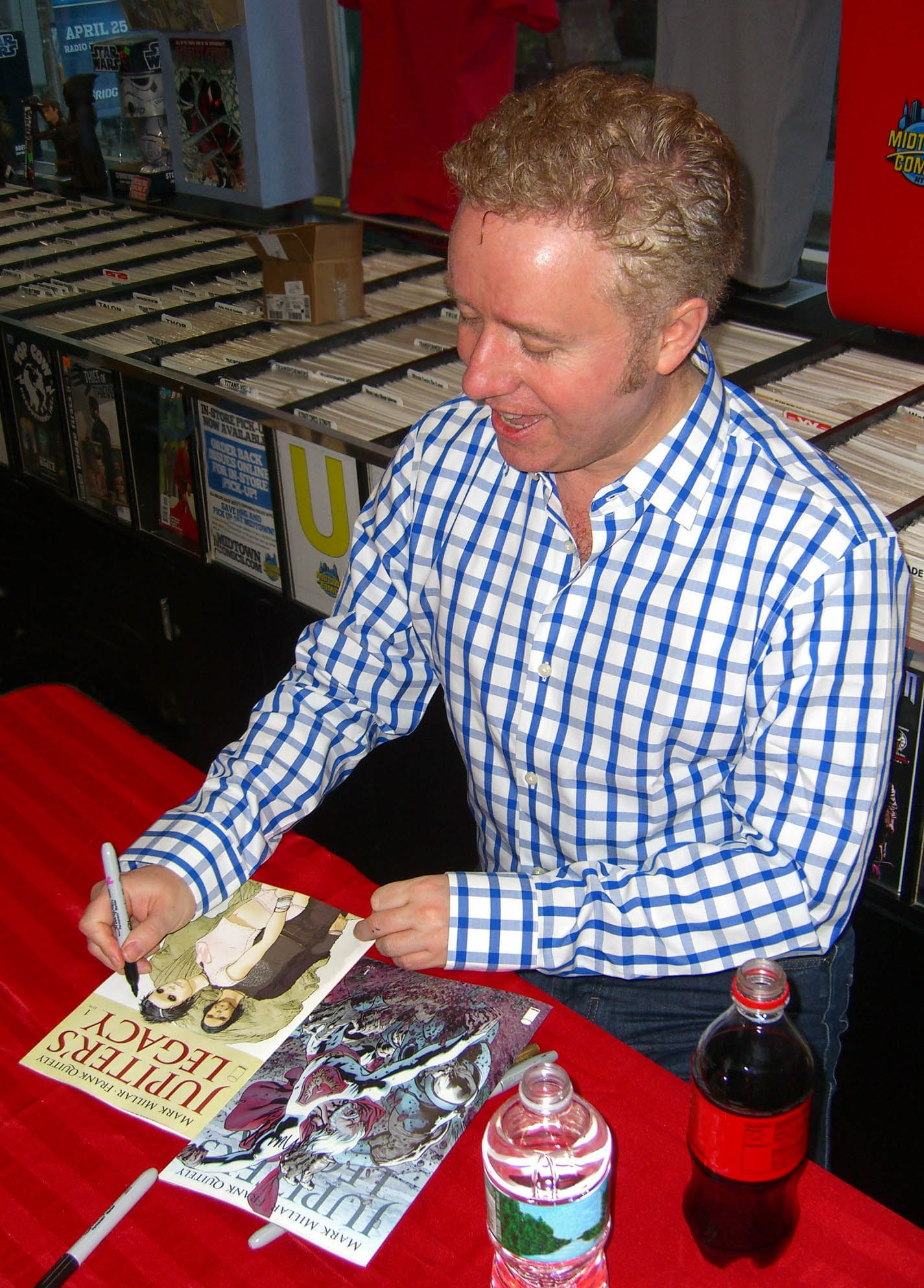
Writer Mark Millar signing copies of Jupiter's Legacy #1, featuring the Frank Quitely and Bryan Hitch covers, at Midtown Comics in Manhattan

== Development ==
Jupiter's Legacy was initially planned to be titled Jupiter's Children.[1][2][3] The original concept for the series was developed by writer Mark Millar after reading the memoirs of Star Wars actress Carrie Fisher. In her memoirs, Fisher noted that despite her fame as Princess Leia, she did not feel exceptional because her parents were even more famous. This observation led Millar to reflect on the challenges of living up to parental expectations, noting that even a character such as Princess Leia could experience a sense of inadequacy in comparison to previous generations.[4]

Millar described the story as reflecting a generational conflict similar to that depicted in Hamlet. One of the central themes of the series explores the experience of growing up as the children of iconic superheroes, comparable to figures such as Wonder Woman and Superman, and the difficulty of maintaining the legacy established by earlier generations.

The series was conceived as a large-scale narrative focused on superheroes while also examining their relationship to the American ideal. Millar cited several influences on the development of the series, including Star Wars, King Kong, origin stories from the Golden Age of Comics, and elements of Roman mythology. The title Jupiter was chosen because of its association with grandeur and mythological symbolism, reflecting the intended epic scope of the story. Millar aimed to modernize these themes by combining classical mythological elements with contemporary imagery and a narrative structure inspired by Wagnerian traditions.

Additional themes and motifs explored in the series include the dawn of humanity, the origin of Earth, and contemporary concerns related to the global economy and the potential decline of capitalism. Millar explained:[5]

As someone who grew up with an American flag in my bedroom, I watched from across the Atlantic in the past few years to see something I never thought I'd see in my lifetime: poverty in the States. It actually touches my life because a lot of my friends who are comic book fans or freelancers will tell me stories I could never have imagined happening in my lifetime, like how their local gas station is closing down because no one in town has the money to run a car anymore. It's a country that, growing up, I always associated with things getting bigger and better, and so to see it contracting is actually quite terrifying. That served as the inspiration for the backdrop to this story. The superheroes are impotent in the face of this complex situation, and that's where things kick off...This story is my love letter to America. That idea of democracy and everyone having an equal say is such a fundamentally decent one and something we should cherish...And for me, the United States has always been tied up with superheroes as well. Maybe that's because Wonder Woman and Superman are wearing the American flag. It seems a nice analogy to tie in the end of the American Empire with this big, grand twilight of the superheroes kind of story.

Asked about the pulp era opening scenes of issue one, in which the group of protagonists charter a boat to journey to a mysterious island, Millar explained that King Kong is his favorite film, and that the sequence in which that film's characters travel to Skull Island is "one of the greatest ever". Millar further explained that he wanted to give the characters a superhero origin that was more both mythical and simple, such as the Golden Age Green Lantern and the Silver Age Flash, instead of grounding it in real world science. The mystery of what exactly happened to the protagonists of Jupiter's Legacy on the island in 1932 is gradually revealed during the course of the miniseries, beginning with issue #4.

In October 2012 Millar stated that his intention for the series was to have it produced as closely as possible to a monthly schedule, which he predicted would mean an issue published every six weeks, and that after the first five issues, which represents Book One of the story, there would be a break of a few months for the creative team to catch up, before resuming with the second half. Millar announced that the entire series would be released over the course of 20 months, for 10 – 12 issues in total. However, issue 4 was not published until January 1, 2014, and issue 5 was not published until January 14, 2015. In response, Millar announced that beginning in April 2015, all Millarworld titles would be completely drawn before the publication of their debut issues, to ensure a monthly schedule.

The first three issues of the series are collected in Jupiter's Children: Giant-Sized Edition #1, which was published on December 26, 2013 for $3.99.

In October 2014 Millar revealed that he would expand the universe of Jupiter's Legacy with Jupiter's Circle, a ten-issue prequel set in 1959, when the Utopian, Lady Liberty and their contemporaries were in their prime, and interacting with such real-life personalities as J. Edgar Hoover and Katharine Hepburn. The first issue debuted in April 2015. Frank Quitely provided covers and character designs for the prequel, while its interiors are illustrated by Wilfredo Torres and Davide Gianfelice. Following the conclusion of Book One of the Jupiter's Circle, it was indicated that Millar would publish Book Two of the parent series, Jupiter's Legacy.

Although Millar stated that he began sharing his concept for Jupiter's Legacy with filmmakers with whom he was acquainted since he began working on it in early 2012, he wanted the project completely worked out before he embarked in earnest on a film adaptation. He stated that he had actor Richard Dreyfuss in mind the entire time he wrote Walter, and hopes for him to play the character, calling Dreyfuss "one of the cinematic greats". Millar also explained that film adaptation of the book would require an entire trilogy, and that the third act in particular "needs room to breath[e]".

== Synopses ==
This links to a chronological list of story arcs in Jupiter's Legacy, its prequel series Jupiter's Circle, later rebranded as Jupiter's Legacy Volumes 1 and 2, and its sequel series, Jupiter's Legacy: Requiem and Jupiter's Legacy: Finale. The first, five-issue volume of Jupiter's Legacy premiered in April 2013, and was published monthly by Image Comics.

== Characters ==
=== The first generation ===
Sheldon Sampson/The Utopian – A patriotic American who lost everything in the Stock Market Crash of 1929, and who in 1932 charters a boat to a mysterious island 600 miles west of Cape Verde after the island appears to him in a dream. Sheldon, who believes that the United States was the greatest idea in human history, and for whom the United States Constitution is sacred, is convinced that the island holds gifts that will return the country to greatness. After journeying to the island with his brother Walter and a group of five old college friends, including his future wife Grace, he becomes a Superman analogue named the Utopian, who is regarded as the greatest superhero on the planet. Donning a red and white costume with a gold eagle chest emblem, he and his five companions to the island form a superhero group called the Union, with headquarters located in New York City.

Sheldon's first wife is a television executive named Jane, who is good friends with Grace in the 1960s. Jane had thought Sheldon would have proposed to Grace after they acquired their superhuman powers, as Grace's family was as rich as Sheldon's, and she long harbored a crush on him, but as Sheldon tells Jane, he was not in love with Grace. However, Sheldon and Jane, who are unable to bear children, eventually divorce, and by 2013, he and Grace are the married parents to Chloe and Brandon, whom Sheldon views as shallow celebrities, feeling that he has failed them as a parent. He approaches crises reactively and leads by example, though he is criticized by Walter and the younger generation as old-fashioned and out of touch. He and Grace are the last two superheroes who still maintain their secret identities.

In his civilian identity during the 1950-60s storyline of the prequel spinoff Jupiter's Circle, he is the CEO of one of the most successful companies in the United States, with a fortune about half as large as John D. Rockefeller III's, but eventually gives his fortune to charity in the late 1960s. Jane eventually divorces him due to her perceived inability to live up to the perfect example he sets, after which Sheldon and Grace become a couple. By 2013, as seen in Jupiter's Legacy, Sheldon runs an auto repair shop in Los Angeles because he says an honest day's work keeps one grounded. Sheldon leads the Union according to a strict moral code, suspending Walter's son Jules from the main team for dating a woman that he rescued from a fire. He also believes that superheroes should not unilaterally interfere in the actions of their government but should obey their elected leaders, which puts him into conflict with Walter, who along with Brandon, murders Sheldon.

Sheldon possesses the powers of flight, superhuman strength and resistance to injury. His super speed allows him to read sixty books a minute, and as a result, Grace comments in 1965 that he "pretty much reads everything." Sheldon can survive in the vacuum of space indefinitely, and can fly 170 million miles in less than three hours in the 1960s, allowing him to travel at least as far as the Jovian moon Europa. He also has the power to project beams of energy from his eyes, and possesses the power of telekinesis. He can use the latter ability to lift several people in the air, even if they are not within his line of sight, and carry them with him as he flies. He can also create a telekinetic bubble around himself and others, and use it to carry a quantity of breathable air to areas of vacuum so that non-superhumans inside the bubble can survive. His sense of hearing is so acute that even in the thin atmosphere of Europa, he is able, in 1965, to pick up an ultra-high frequency, low pulse-beat signal broadcast by a handheld transmitter 1,000 miles under the moon's surface that is inaudible to the normal human ear. On Earth, he can hear and precisely pinpoint the location of a burglar alarm 35 blocks away. Using his powers in tandem, he can tunnel 1,000 miles beneath the surface of Europa. He can hit a golf ball and land a hole in one on the Moon, though it has not been specified what abilities he uses to make the calculations needed to do this. He is immune to his brother's psychic abilities, but his invulnerability is not unlimited, as he can be injured if attacked by other superhumans with superhuman strength, especially en masse, and in 2013, he is ultimately killed by the energy projected by his son Brandon's eyes.

Sheldon Sampson was named after the winner of the charity auction that series writer Mark Millar held at the launch of the book, an event he holds every time he launches a creator-owned book.

Walter Sampson/Brainwave – Sheldon's brother who, after visiting the island in 1932, became one of the six original superheroes. He originally wore a red and blue costume with a red triangular chest emblem bearing a white circle and a jagged red line in its center. He has the power of flight and psychic powers that enable him to separate another person's mind from their physical body and imprison them in a "psychic painting" of his own creation, which is his "favorite trick". He can also create psychic illusions and kill a person by psychically inducing aneurysms in them. His other psionic abilities include telekinesis, with which he can cause an airplane flying passing overhead to fall to the ground, and pyrokinesis, with which he can instantly incinerate a person. The only person on whom Walter's telepathic powers do not work is Sheldon, although Walter's onetime teammate, George Hutchence (also known as Skyfox) wore a special set of ear plugs of his own design that blocked Walter's telepathic attacks. Like Sheldon, Walter can travel to and survive at the altitude of orbital satellites. According to Millar, "He isn't as strong or as handsome as his famous sibling and lacks charisma, but he's thoughtful and very aware of his legacy as he hits old age. He's looking around at the financial crash and wondering if he can help in ways other than rescuing kittens from trees and all those nice things superheroes do."

Walter advocates more direct political activism on the part of superheroes and feels that they need to fix the ailing economy and tell President Obama what he should be doing in his second term. Walter's blueprints for fixing global problems involve climate engineering, eliminating the income tax, underground homes, and a ban on all religions.

The prequel spinoff series Jupiter's Circle reveals that in their youth, Walter and teammate George Hutchence have a relationship marked by both friendship and frequent antagonism on George's part. When George's girlfriend Sunny breaks up with him and begins seeing Walter, it ends George's friendship with Walter, and leads George to cut all ties with the team. Walter would eventually marry Sunny and finish the Supermax prison for supercriminals that George designed, though George would eventually bear a vendetta against Walter after Walter tells George that he, Walter, used his telepathy to make Sunny fall in love with Walter, though Walter would deny this to Sheldon. Sunny eventually died of cancer at some point prior to the events depicted in Jupiter's Legacy 2 #4.

Grace Kennedy Sampson/Lady Liberty – Sheldon's second wife, who journeyed with him to the mysterious island in 1932, and as a superhero, wears a blue suit with a gold eagle chest emblem similar to the Utopian's and goes by the codename Lady Liberty. Born Grace Kennedy, she is a physically strong woman who, prior to journeying to the island, was once the captain of a ladies' wrestling team. Like Sheldon, she is given superhuman strength by aliens encountered on the island. In the 1960s Grace is a partner in a law firm and a single woman with an unsuccessful social life, having not had a boyfriend since returning to the United States with the super powers she was given on the island. According to Sheldon's first wife, Jane, Grace always had a crush on Sheldon, but when they returned from the island after 18 months, he was in love with Jane, not Grace, whereas Sheldon thought she would pair off with George. After Sheldon and Jane divorce, however, Grace and Sheldon become a couple and bear Brandon and Chloe. Decades later, the couple are the last two heroes who still maintain secret identities. Grace's degree of invulnerability is such that her flesh can only be penetrated by the edged weapons wielded by her fellow superheroes, which they use to kill her.

Richard Conrad/Blue-Bolt – Richard Conrad was one of the six founding members of the Union, who went by the alias Blue-Bolt. In the 1950s, as depicted in the prequel spinoff Jupiter's Circle, he wore a blue costume, possessed the power of flight, and used a power rod of his own design that could project energy as a weapon. A neonatal surgeon at Los Angeles' St. Thomas Presbyterian Hospital, with connections in the Hollywood entertainment scene, he hails from a prominent political family in San Francisco. He is also a closeted homosexual who patronizes male prostitutes. Richard's friend Katharine Hepburn opines that regardless of the lavender marriages in Hollywood during that time, Richard, by virtue of risking his life for others every day, should not have to hide his homosexuality. When FBI Director J. Edgar Hoover discovers Richard's secret life, he attempts to blackmail Richard, threatening to ruin his life if he does not reveal his teammates' secret identities. This leads Richard to attempt suicide, but he survives his attempt thanks to his teammate Fitz, after which he decides to stand up to Hoover's threat. After George secretly blackmails Hoover with evidence of Hoover's own homosexuality, Hoover drops the matter.

Fitz/The Flare – Fitz was one of the six founding members of the Union. In his youth he wears a yellow costume with a white chest emblem depicting a red arrow, and is known as the Flare, a superhero with the power of super-speed, flight, superhuman strength, and the ability to project yellow energy blasts that can burn a target or knock a superhuman opponent unconscious. His father left him and his mother when he was nine, from which Fitz derived the observation that nothing lasts forever. He and his wife Joyce, who met when they were twenty-one, have two sons and a daughter, the youngest of which, his younger son, was an infant during the timeline of Jupiter's Circle #1. Years later, when his youngest son is a young child, following a superhero battle in the Midwest, Fitz meets a 19-year-old local girl named April Kelly. Fitz, who feels he no longer has anything in common with Joyce, begins an affair with Kelly and takes her on as a sidekick. He later sets her up with a job and an apartment, but when he lobbies for her to join the Union, the other members refuse, both because April has no superhuman abilities and because his affair with her is an affront to Joyce, who they point out loves Fitz. After they order him to end his relationship with her, lest he be fired from the team, Fitz does so, but then divorces Joyce and proposes to April, who accepts. After Fitz is critically injured in battle and is left a paraplegic, April leaves him, after which Fitz realizes that he made a mistake, and has now lost everything. Joyce reunites with him, however, in order to take care of him. By 1965 Fitz regains enough of his strength to resume his career as The Flare.

George Hutchence/Skyfox – George Hutchence was one of the six founding members of the Union, who fights crime by the name Skyfox. He was the one-time best friend of Sheldon Sampson, but after they suffered a falling out, George and the Union became adversaries. George Hutchence's past as a superhero and friend to the Sampsons is depicted in the spinoff miniseries Jupiter's Circle, which establishes that as one of the six original superheroes, he wears a blue and purple costume with the head of a fox as a chest emblem, and has the power of flight, super strength, and the ability to survive as high as a mile above the Earth. He is also a talented engineer who uses his ability to build weapons that he used when fighting superhuman threats, and uses his wealth to fund the team's activities. Among his designs are a Supermax prison for supercriminals that Walter would eventually finish, and a special set of ear plugs that he wears that can block Walter's telepathic attacks. Both plugs must be worn to fully block such an attack, as wearing only one is shown to allow Walter to paralyze the wearer's motor functions. He lives in a mansion which has a cavern filled with various vehicles, devices and other artifacts related to his crime-fighting, at least until he quits the Union in 1962.

Skyfox emerges as the sex symbol of the team, whose public image leads him to have liaisons with a thousand women, though in 1960 he begins a relationship with a 26-year-old model named Sunny. His relationship with his teammates is characterized by certain eccentricities, such as engaging Richard in a physical altercation over the latter's preference for Ernest Hemingway over James Joyce, and challenging Walter in a fencing match that sees the loser, Walter, run naked through Central Park, only for a nude George to then join Walter himself on the run. On another occasion, he has sidekicks telekinetically rip Walter's penthouse apartment out of its building and place it in Africa, an example of the "needling" Walter felt George had inflicted upon him since they were children. George also suffers from alcoholism, a trait he feels he inherited from his father, along with his mother's mental illness. When George proposes to Sunny, Sunny, who sees George as a fragile child at heart, declines, telling him that she cannot start a family with someone so immature. After she begins a relationship with Walter, George leaves his estate to Sheldon, cuts all ties with the team, ends his superhero career, and moves to Kentucky, where he lives incognito. By 1965, George has joined the Beatnik culture, and comes to believe that as a superhero, he was a pawn of the establishment, to the detriment of the underclass. During the Watts riots, George intervenes on behalf of rioters, dispatching police officers, and encouraging looters. He subsequently takes Vice President Hubert Humphrey hostage, refusing to release him until President Lyndon Johnson ends the Vietnam War. When Walter reveals to George that he, Walter, used his telepathy to make Sunny fall in love with him, George attacks Walter, after which he is subdued by the Union, and imprisoned, for which he bears a vendetta against Walter thereafter.

George bears a son, Eddie, who goes by the nickname Hutch. Hutch does not have superhuman abilities, so George built a power rod for Hutch that would simulate George's own powers. The rod grants the user the ability to project repulsive energy, teleportation, and the ability to remotely control vehicles. By 2013, George is known as the greatest supervillain of all time, one whom Hutch says was thought of as a monster. Hutch eventually marries Sheldon and Grace's daughter, Chloe, by which George and the Sampsons are in-laws.

Dr. Jack Hobbs – Self-described as the world's smartest man, Hobbs is a supercriminal and adversary of the Union who is released from 18 months of solitary confinement in the Supermax prison in 1965. Headquartered in Franklin Senior High School in Upstate New York, his henchmen (with the exception of his female companion, Ms. Wanamaker) dress entirely in black, and have the names of famous scientists written on their shirts in white letters. He believes the rise of superheroes have signified a Darwinian shift that has rewritten the laws of probability that require successful criminals to be supercriminals, and which predicts a tipping point in 2016 that will mean the end of the human race. Believing that superhumans must be completely eradicated, he builds a directed energy weapon that takes away the Union's powers and bestows them upon himself and his henchmen. He is defeated through the intervention of Skyfox, who rescues the Union and restores their powers.

=== The second generation ===
Chloe Sampson – Sheldon and Grace's daughter. She inherited superhuman abilities from her parents, but as a woman in her twenties at the beginning of the series, has not followed in their footsteps as a superhero, preferring instead a socialite's life of nightclubs and drugs. She believes she is frequently in conflict with her mother because her mother is irritated by Chloe's non-confrontational nature, and instead engages in charity work, thinking it will please her, but Chloe's brother Brandon believes she cynically participates in indiscriminate endorsement work for personal gain and to curry favor with their mother. Chloe also laments how perfect her parents are, regretting that she will never be as "cool" as her father or as attractive as her mother. She prefers dating "disappointing bad boys" rather than superheroes because the latter would be akin to "dating her father", and according to her therapist, she does not maintain proper relationships because she always compares her relationships to her parents' idealized marriage. According to Millar, Chloe and Brandon are in their twenties, and live completely in the shadow of their parents. He created them because, as he explains, "I like the idea of exploring what it would be like to grow up as the kids of the two most famous and beloved people on the planet. This side of things has a very Postcards from the Edge feel and there's enormous tension between them all." As the series progresses, she and her boyfriend, Hutch, become fugitives after the other superheroes, led by Walter and Brandon, murder her parents, and the two hide in Australia while raising their gifted son, Jason. She possesses a sonic scream with which she can shatter durable materials, or create a sonic boom that can dispel a megatsunami the height of a skyscraper.

In addition to the ability to fly, Chloe possesses a degree of invulnerability that allows her body to easily survive impact with vehicles traveling at high speed. Other abilities she has displayed include the ability to travel to the Moon and survive in the vacuum of space, and the ability to melt objects at long-range, which she uses in issue 5 to disable the rifles carried by a troop of soldiers attacking her son, and telekinesis, which she uses in the same issue to physically repel a large number of her pursuers. Her eyesight extends beyond the portion of the electromagnetic spectrum visible to ordinary humans, which allows her to easily see objects cloaked with stealth technology.

Brandon Sampson – Sheldon and Grace's son. Like his sister, Brandon uses his celebrity status to obtain endorsement deals. He also enjoys dalliances with superhero groupies. Despite his father's urging to do more altruistic superhero work, Brandon feels that there is no one "cool" to fight any more and that the great battles are in the past, with the best villains having died ten or twenty years ago. He also feels that his father was never there for him growing up, which Brandon's therapist thinks is the reason Sheldon is so critical of Brandon. Like Chloe, Brandon laments that he will never be as smart or as perfect as his father. Brandon possesses the power of telekinesis, which enables him to fly, allows him to lift objects as massive as a fully loaded freighter, and can also survive in outer space like his father. He also has superhuman hearing, and can project energy from his eyes that is powerful enough to dissolve his father's flesh, which he uses to murder his father at the end of issue #3.

Jules Sampson – Walter's son, who works alongside him and the other heroes. Jules was suspended from the main team by Sheldon for dating a woman that Jules rescued from a fire, for which Jules feels Sheldon is questionably old-fashioned. During one battle between his elders and an escaped superhuman convict named Blackstar, Jules deliberately maintains his distance from the melee, intending to land a few blows near the end of it in order to avoid getting hit, and later complains of a cut knee, for which he is criticized by Sheldon.

Jules is an expert engineer/mechanic, with a gift for high technology. After Walter and Brandon's forces find the mangled remnants of Jason Hutchence's gene meta-scanner on the Moon, Jules assures his father that he can fix anything, including the scanner. This enables Walter and Brandon to find the rebels led by Chloe, Hutch and Skyfox despite the stealth technology rendering their floating base invisible.

Eddie "Hutch" Hutchence (Note: Hutch's first name, and the user authentication technology of the power rod, are revealed in Jupiter's Legacy: Requiem #3 (August 2021).) – In the beginning of the series, Hutch (whose nickname is derived from his surname, Hutchence) is Chloe's boyfriend and the father of her child. By issue 4, the story has jumped forward nine years, and the two of them are raising their son, Jason, incognito in Australia. Hutch's father, George Hutchence, was once one of six original superheroes granted powers on the island, and the one-time best friend of Sheldon, but after they suffered a falling out, George became the greatest supervillain of all time, one whom Hutch says was thought of as a monster. Hutch thinks that Chloe's interest in him may have been motivated by a desire for rebellion against her parents. George felt bad that Hutch did not have any superhuman powers, and so customized an old flashlight of Hutch's into a hand-held weapon called a power rod that could simulate George's own powers. The power rod allows Hutch to teleport himself and others to any point on the planet by merely speaking the name of the location, project energy that can briefly physically repel people like a battering ram, including other superhumans like Walter, and remotely control vehicles. The power rod is keyed to Hutch's unique biosignature so that only he may use it. After Walter and Brandon lead the other superheroes in killing Chloe's parents, Hutch rescues Chloe and the two become fugitives, taking refuge in Australia, where they raise their gifted son, Jason. Millar describes Hutch as "our Han Solo. Incredibly funny, cool and likeable."

Jeff – Jeff first appears in Jupiter's Circle, where he is introduced as a nephew to both George/Skyfox and Fitz/Flare, and a member of the teenage superhero group Teen Scene, a group whose activities are funded by George.

Peter – The oldest of Fitz/Flare's three children, and the older of his two sons. Peter is angered when Fitz leaves Peter's mother to be with the 19-year-old April Kelly, and vows to kill him one day, but is pleased when Fitz is rendered a paraplegic following the Union's confrontation with evil superbeings from a parallel Earth. By the time of Jupiter's Circle #4, he has developed higher levels of strength and speed, enabling him to hit a plane passing over head with a rock.

Barnabas Wolfe – Wolfe is a former supervillain with "Sherlock Holmesian instincts" who hunts rogue superhumans for Walter and Brandon's regime. He has the ability to transmute matter on a molecular level, enabling him to change one substance into another. For example, he once rearranged all the air molecules in an office into a gas similar to methoxyflurane, rendering every non-superhuman in the office unconscious (though he himself was immune to this). He can transmute air into a hard substance in order to create barriers from attack, and transmute concrete into tendrils with which he can attack opponents. Other applications of this ability include the formation of an unidentified pink substance that he can conjure for different functions, including a lighter-than-air platform beneath his feet that allow him to levitate himself, and as a restraining device, one strong enough to immobilize Joan Wilson, a superhuman who once grew to the height of a building. Wolfe carries a walking stick, and has been depicted using it to manifest his abilities, as when, for example, he negated the flight ability of a fleeing Jason Hutchence, though it was not made clear which ability he used to do this. He attempts to apprehend Chloe and her family in issue 5, but they manage to escape him.

=== The third generation ===
Jason Hutchence/Utopian II – Jason is Chloe and Hutch's eight-year-old son, who first appears in issue 4. He has superhuman abilities, but at the direction of his parents, who are in hiding from the other superheroes by living inconspicuous lives in Australia, Jason conceals his gifts by deliberately doing poorly at both school work and sports. Unbeknownst to his parents, however, Jason secretly engages in superheroic activity. Because of his frequent absences, his schoolmates and parents deduce the truth of his double life in issue 5. He is capable of flight and superhuman speed. He can survive for indefinite periods in outer space. He even has the ability to verbally communicate while on the Moon through some as-yet unspecified means. He also has a genius intellect, with which he is able to build a meta-scanner that can scan the Earth's population for people like him who have specially augmented genes. By the time of Requiem, which is set three decades after volume 2, Jason has taken on his maternal grandfather's superhero identity, the Utopian. He has also married Neutrino (Gabriella) and the two have a daughter together, Maisie.

Otto Hutchence – Otto is Chloe and Hutch's second son. He is killed by the Paloraxian queen in issue 5.

Sophie Hutchence – Sophie is Chloe and Hutch's only daughter.

Barney Hutchence – Barney is Chloe and Hutch's third son and youngest child. Unlike his siblings, Barney wasn't born with any super powers. It is revealed in issue 6 that "Barney" is actually Jason's secret identity.

== Critical reception ==
=== Main series ===
The series holds an average critics' rating of 8.2 out of 10 at the review aggregator website Comic Book Roundup.

==== Issue 1 ====
Issue 1 holds an 8.2 rating at Comic Book Roundup. Greg McElhatton of Comic Book Resources gave issue #1 four out of five stars, calling it "Millar's strongest new comic in a long time." McElhatton praised out Millar's script, in particular the quiet tone of the 1932 sequence that piqued his interest, and the fight scene between Walter and Blackstar, which McElhatton felt represented a unique approach to superhero clichés. McElhatton lauded Frank Quitely's artwork as "elegant", in particular his ability to draw the reader's eye toward the center of panels. Compliments were also given to Peter Doherty's colors, which were used well to differentiate between the 1932 and modern scenes. Melissa Grey of IGN gave the issue of 9.2 score of "Amazing", lauding the world in the story "immediately familiar and uniquely original", and saying that Millar's examination of "the shades of gray" between black and white regarding heroes struck a chord unlike any of his previous attempts at the theme of incorporating superhumans into the real world. Grey said of Quitely's artwork that it "blends a powerful realism with a sense of the fantastical in a way that is seamlessly integrated with Millar's narrative." David Brothers of ComicsAlliance thought the issue "fell short". While Brothers complimented some aspects of the writing and art, such as the 1932 scenes and the psychic paintings, he felt that Millar's characterization and his take on realistic superheroes in the modern scenes was unoriginal, his dialogue in the modern scenes unnatural, that Quitely's characters were not well-designed, and that the book lacked the spectacle by Millar that would've given a better opportunity for Quitely and Doherty to have effected better work. Rich Johnston of Bleeding Cool gave the issue a positive review for the depiction of the socioeconomic and political conflicts, Quitely and Doherty's art, and the soap opera plot of the characters' power plays. Patrick Hume of Newsarama gave the issue an 8 out of 10, calling it an effective, absorbing and smart superhero story that pushes the boundaries of the genre. Hume noted the presence of Millar's trademark black humor and "full-throttle action", as well as "a maturity and thematic sophistication that has not been apparent in other recent work". Though Hume thought some of Millar's delivery of the issue's ideas was at times heavy-handed, he was impressed enough by the book to continue with it. Hume also thought that Quitely's more defined, gritty, more intimate art was better-suited to the story than the large-scale, widescreen action he effected on The Authority. Doherty's subdued color palette was also noted by Hume.

==== Issue 2 ====
Issue 2 holds an 8.1 rating at Comic Book Roundup. James Hunt of Comic Book Resources gave issue #2 four out of five stars, finding it easily engaging, better-paced than the first issue, and enjoying the social satire with which Millar employed parallels with ancient Greek and Roman tragedies, and creating a well-rounded and well-realized cast, which was not typified by what Hunt regarded as Millar's usual cynicism. Hunt also called Quitely's art "beautiful", calling him "one of the definitive superhero artists of all time", and seeing elements in his artwork that were similar to Quitely's work on All-Star Superman. However, Hunt thought the coloring was "muddy and muted", and obscured the details. Jesse Schedeen of IGN gave the issue a 7.3 score of "Good", saying that he wished Millar would explore genres other than superheroes in his Millarworld work, and was disappointed that Jupiter's Legacy was not the book to break that trend that it had initially seemed to him. While Schedeen thought the issue's material was interesting, and thought Millar, Quitely and Doherty's handling of it was dramatically successful, the superhero deconstruction did not feel fresh or original to him. Schedeen also did not feel the plot twist at the end of the issue was justified in light of the established characters. Zach Wilkerson of Multiversity Comics gave the issue a score of 7.2, calling it "A beautiful book hindered by a ho-hum plot." Wilkerson felt that while the "breathtaking" artwork justified buying the book, it lacked any noteworthy or original concepts, and criticized the unlikeable Brandon and Chloe. Nonetheless, Wilkerson felt that the book harbored enough depth and potential to be a modern classic, provided that the creative team properly follow-through on the foundations they laid.

==== Issue 3 ====
Issue 3 holds an 8.8 rating at Comic Book Roundup. Wilkerson gave issue #3 a score of 9.2, saying that while the series appears derivative of Watchmen and The Authority, its resonant themes of familial conflict and politics set it apart from those stories, and reassessed his review of issue #2, as "unfair", saying that the third issue's developments, in which the story moves forward in earnest, validates the content of the first two issues. Wilkerson called the story "gut-wrenching" and Quitely's depiction of Sheldon and Grace's death was "visceral". Anghus Houvouras of Flickering Myth felt that the plot was too obvious, the generational conflict was uninspired, and felt like Millar was recycling ideas he had used in his previous work. Houvouras also felt that there were no characters in the story with which a reader could connect or invest in, as the cast was composed of "stereotypes and caricatures". Houvouras also felt the issue was paced far too fast. Houvouras said that Quitely's depiction of Utopian's defeat was "beautifully staged", but that the lack of information revealed about him made his death "ultimately meaningless" and "at best morbidly hilarious and at worst sub-par paper thin plotting."

==== Issue 4 ====
Issue 4 holds a 7.9 rating at Comic Book Roundup. The highest score given to the issue was Chris Bennett and Ross Sweeney of Big Comic Page, who rated it a 10. Bennett lauded Millar's ability to create a plausible fictional world, and stated that while dystopias are an overused trope in fiction, Millar's use of it was an enjoyable one. Bennett also complimented Quitely's "precise line work and the overall expressiveness" in his art. Bennett criticized, however, the wait between this and the previous issue. Jim Johnson of Comic Book Resources, who gave the issue an 8.0, took notice of the sense of wonderment exhibited by the 1930s "pulp-ish, old school feel" of the bedtime story that Chloe tells Jason, and the contrast with the cold, fascist reality of the present surveillance state in which the family lives, which Millar and Quitely effected with the full-page illustration of the monitoring station hovering over their neighborhood. Soup Owens-Fowler of Geeked-Out Nation gave the issue a 5.0, saying that after months of waiting for the issue to be published, the issue was a disappointment, despite the depiction Chloe and Hutch teaching Jason to hide his abilities, which provided some enjoyable moments. Owens-Fowler though there should have been more establishing shots of the current dystopia, and also thought that Frank Quitely did not provide his best work despite having months to work on it, calling the art "serviceable", but not as impressive as in past comics, the mysterious alien college being a notable exception.

==== Issue 5 ====
Issue 5 holds an 8.8 rating at Comic Book Roundup. Erik Gonzalez of All-Comic.com, who rated the book a 10, lauded the issue for the character introspection, the family drama exhibited in the lunar scene with Chloe and Jason, and the manner in which Frank Quitely rendered the character's facial expressions, and the realism of the superhuman battle. He also praised Pete Doherty's colors. Jesse Schedeen of IGN gave the issue a score of 8.2, criticizing the story as lacking anything compelling enough to justify the 10-month wait for the issue. Nonetheless, Schedeen thought Barnabas Wolfe was a "fun new villain", and praised Quitely's use of posture and body language. All the other reviews counted at Comic Book Roundup gave the issue a score of 8.0 or higher except for Lido Giovacchini of Front Towards Gamer, who gave it a 6.5, the issue's lowest score at the Roundup. Though overall Lido enjoyed the earlier issues' themes of youth disenfranchisement, he felt that the storyline's shift towards the dystopia created by Walter and Brandon's totalitarian regime made it less interesting and unique than it earlier had been. Lido stated that while Millar is skilled at story structure and plotting, he did not think that he is equally proficient at imbuing his stories with depth and meaning, calling the latter "misinformed" and "sophomoric".

=== Volume 2 ===
The second volume of Jupiter's Legacy (June 2016 – July 2017) holds a critics' rating of 8.6 at Comic Book Roundup.

=== Prequels and sequels ===
The spinoff Jupiter's Circle holds a rating of 7.3 out of 10 at Comic Book Roundup. The second volume has an average rating of 8.3, based on 22 reviews of its six issues. The 2021 sequel series Jupiter's Legacy: Requiem also yielded positive critical reception, with the debut issue garnering a 7.9 from 6 reviews, and the subsequent two issues both garnering ratings of 9.6, each from a single reviewer.

== Collected editions ==
Title	Material collected	Published date	ISBN
Jupiter's Legacy Vol.1	Jupiter's Legacy #1-5	April 2015	978-1632153104
Jupiter's Circle Vol.1	Jupiter's Circle (vol. 1) #1-6	October 2015	978-1632155566
Jupiter's Circle Vol.2	Jupiter's Circle (vol. 2) #1-6	July 2016	978-1632157072
Jupiter's Legacy Vol.2	Jupiter's Legacy (vol. 2) #1-5	August 2017	978-1632158895

Following the acquisition of MiIllarworld by Netflix and subsequent production of the Jupiter's Legacy TV series, the original collections of the comic series and sequels were republished under the title of Jupiter's Legacy.

Title	Material collected	Published date	ISBN
Jupiter's Legacy Vol. 1	Jupiter's Circle (vol. 1) #1–6	October 2020	978-1534318106
Jupiter's Legacy Vol. 2	Jupiter's Circle (vol. 2) #1–6	October 2020	978-1534318113
Jupiter's Legacy Vol. 3	Jupiter's Legacy (vol. 1) #1–5	October 2020	978-1534318120
Jupiter's Legacy Vol. 4	Jupiter's Legacy (vol. 2) #1–5	October 2020	978-1534318137
Jupiter's Legacy Vol. 5	Jupiter's Legacy: Requiem #1–6	February 2022	978-1534321069
Jupiter's Legacy Vol. 6	Jupiter's Legacy: Finale #1–5	August 2025	978-1506744841

== In other media ==
On April 8, 2015, The Hollywood Reporter announced that Mark Millar and Lorenzo di Bonaventura had partnered to develop the comic into feature films. Lorenzo explained his attraction to the property thus: "What appealed to me was the emotional weight of the family dynamic in Shakespearean fashion." In June 2016, Brian and Mark Gunn were announced as the screenwriters that would adapt the property to the big screen. Director James Gunn would later convince Millar that the story worked best as a television series instead of a film, on account of the story's density, which needed a more long-form medium to be told.

On July 17, 2018, it was announced that Netflix had approved a television adaptation of the comic book series, with a series order for a first season. The series was created by Steven S. DeKnight, who is credited as an executive producer alongside di Bonaventura and Dan McDermott. DeKnight was originally the showrunner, before stepping down due to creative differences and was replaced with Sang Kyu Kim, in addition to writing and directing the first episode. On February 11, 2019, it was announced that Josh Duhamel, Ben Daniels, Leslie Bibb, Elena Kampouris, Andrew Horton, Mike Wade and Matt Lanter would star in the series. The series premiered on May 7, 2021. On June 2, 2021, it was reported that Netflix had cancelled the series, though it also announced it would be developing a live action adaption of another one of Mark Millar's comics, Supercrooks, which had been published in 2012, a year before the debut of the Jupiter's Legacy comic. Super Crooks had previously been adapted as an anime by produced by Bones. According to Deadline, Supercrooks would be set in the same fictional universe as Legacy, though Millar was confident that the latter would eventually return, albeit in some other form.
