= Fizzers =

Fizzers is a Scottish slang word for “faces”, a corruption of the French visage. It is the registered trademark used by the Scottish Cartoon Art Studio for a variety of projects featuring their caricature artwork. Fizzers pieces are not executed in the traditional, satirical mode of British caricature as epitomized by Gerald Scarfe, but are inspired by the works of European artists such as Sebastian Krüger and Patrice Ricord.

In April 2006, Mercat Press Ltd of Edinburgh published the first Fizzers book, subtitled Famous Scottish Faces Caricatured. The book featured a foreword by the Scottish stage and screen actor Brian Cox, and included over one hundred caricatures. Mercat Press was bought by Birlinn Ltd in 2007 and the Fizzers book went out of print in 2011 but is still available from online retailers.

The first Fizzers exhibition, subtitled The Alternative Portrait Gallery, ran at the Scottish National Portrait Gallery, Edinburgh from 7 April to 2 July 2006. The show featured over two hundred and fifty pieces and marked the first occasion on which the Gallery had displayed contemporary caricature work in such a manner. Four of the caricatures where acquired as permanent additions to the gallery's collection in April 2007. These were caricatures of the late comedian Chic Murray, lead singer of Wet Wet Wet Marti Pellow, golf champion Sam Torrance and darts champion Jocky Wilson.

Fizzers caricatures were shown at the Platform art space in Easterhouse from 11 March to 5 April 2009. Fizzers: Well Kent Scottish Faces at the People's Palace and Winter Gardens, Glasgow, ran from 18 July to 4 October 2009. The show featured work previously seen at the Scottish National Portrait Gallery as well as a dozen entirely new caricatures.

In 2010 a gallery of Fizzers caricatures were installed as a permanent feature at The Chanter pub on Bread Street in Edinburgh.

From 27 May 2016 to 26 March 2017 the People's Palace will exhibit over 120 selected works from the Fizzers collection to mark its tenth anniversary.
