= Chase Tang =

Taiwanese-Canadian actor

- 唐嘉壕
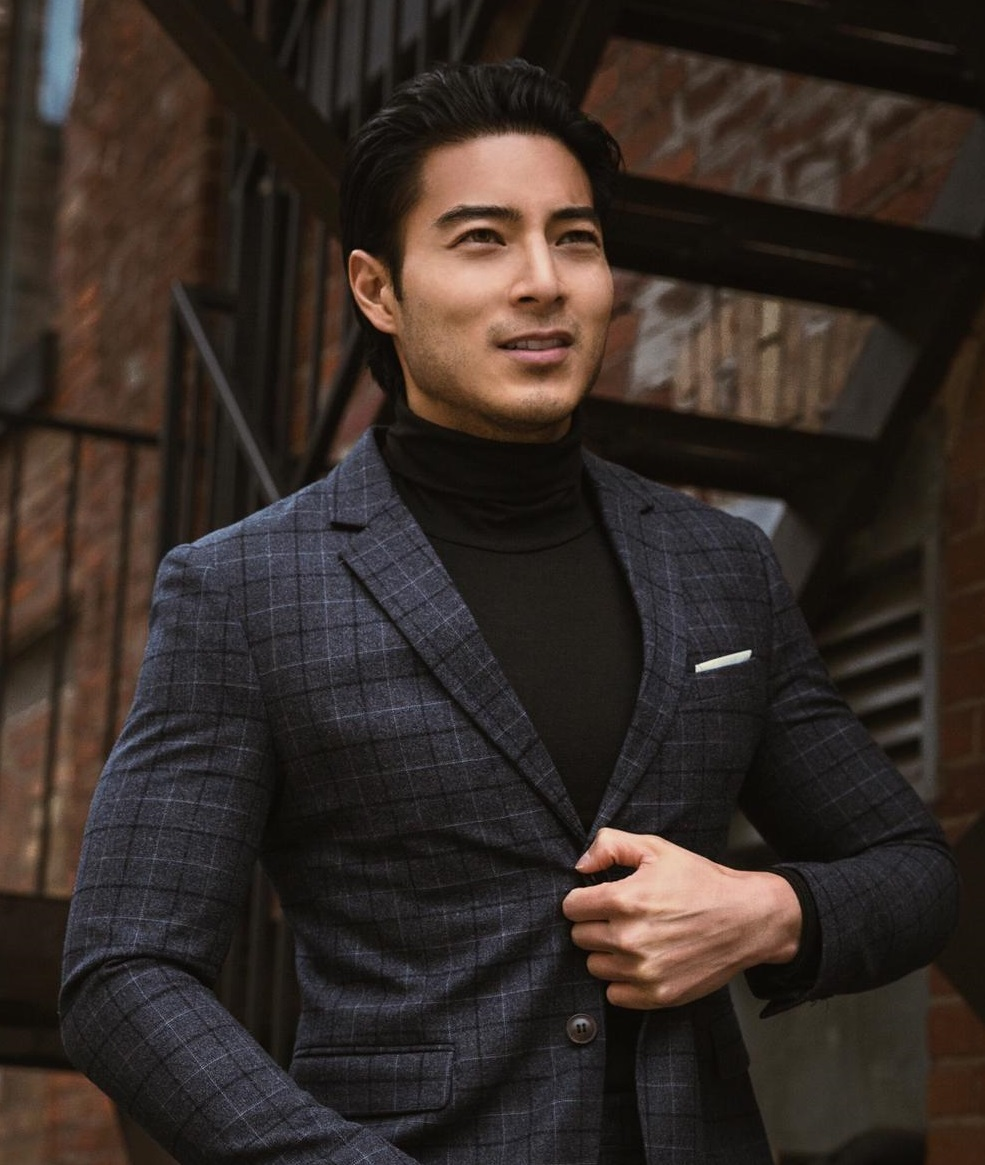
- Tang in 2019
- Born: August 24, 1988 (age 38); Taipei, Taiwan
- Education: University of Guelph (BComm)
- Occupation: Actor
- Years active: 2017–present

Chia-Hao Tang (Chinese: 唐嘉壕; Pe̍h-ōe-jī: Tn̂g Ka-hô; born August 24, 1988), professionally known as Chase Tang, is a Taiwanese-Canadian actor. After completing a degree in commerce from the University of Guelph, Tang gave up a corporate career and instead sought out training as an actor. Tang made his professional debut on television in 2017. Tang has participated in mental health awareness and climate change campaigns, including the UN Environment Programme's "World Is In Our Hands" campaign.

== Early life and education ==
Tang was born in Taipei, Taiwan. He has two elder brothers. In 1992, Tang's family immigrated to Bedford, Nova Scotia, Canada. He grew up in Bedford and Upper Tantallon playing hockey, including time spent as a Nova Scotia AAA hockey player. Tang attended Sir John A. Macdonald High School. He received a Bachelor of Commerce degree from the University of Guelph in 2016, majoring in marketing management.

After struggling to gain momentum in his corporate career, Tang decided to change direction and become an actor. He completed his first acting class in 2016, continuing to take regular classes and coaching, and in 2017 he made his first film appearances. In August 2018 Tang joined ACTRA.

== Career ==
Tang's debut in professional acting started with a POM Wonderful commercial, followed by an uncredited role in Designated Survivor. Since then, he has worked in several short films and TV series. His movie View was viewed at the 2018 Cannes Film Festival In 2019, Tang filmed a scene for the pilot episode of Run. In his first major role, Tang was cast as supervillain Baryon in the Netflix series Jupiter's Legacy. He is an ambassador for TITIKA Active Couture. Tang is also the global spokesperson for Taiwanese refreshment brand Presotea.

=== Activism ===
Tang has used his celebrity status to raise mental health awareness, and has taken on speaking engagements.

He was featured in the UN Environment Programme's (UNEP) "World Is In Our Hands" campaign, a UN's Act Now initiative for climate change awareness.

Tang endorsed Mitzie Hunter for mayor of Toronto during the 2023 mayoral by-election.

== Filmography ==
Year	Title	Role	Ref
Actor
2019	Slasher (TV Series)	Episode: 6am to 9am – Sexy Young Man (uncredited)	
2018	Time, Space & Lee (Short)	Cody	
2018/II	View (Short)	Zong	
2018	Scariest Night of My Life (TV Series documentary)	Her Own Strength + Fright Or Flight – Christoper	
2017	See No Evil (TV Series documentary)	Watch Me Disappear (2017) – Reporter	
2017	Kim's Convenience (TV Series)	Uncredited	
2017	Suits (TV Series)	Uncredited	
2017	Shadowhunters: The Mortal Instruments (TV Series)	Vampire	
2016	Designated Survivor (TV Series)	Background performer uncredited	
Producer
2017/II	The Filmmaker (Documentary)	Producer	
Self
2017/II	The Filmmaker (Documentary)	Chad / John	
