= Scottish Cartoon Art Studio =

The Scottish Cartoon Art Studio is a commercial art studio based in Glasgow, Scotland, made up of a group of professional cartoonists working on a collaborative basis. In this respect the Studio is unique in Scotland.

Christopher Sommerville opened the Studio in 1999 with assistance from The Princes Trust and Glasgow's East End Partnership. Although the Studio works in diverse media, their house speciality is caricature, exhibited and published as Fizzers.

Working alongside Chris are his father Tommy Sommerville, co-creator of the 1990s Glaswegian humour comic Electric Soup and co-founder of the Scottish Cartoonists & Comic Artists Members (SCCAM) Club, and Terry Anderson, former President of the Scottish Artists Union and currently a member of the board of directors of Cartoonists Rights Network International. Various artists have come and gone from the Studio team but, along with Derek Gray and Brian Flynn, the current line-up is made up of cartoonists present since the Studio's opening.

Among notable figures who own caricatures by the Studio's artists are Matt Groening, creator of The Simpsons, film director and author Michael Moore and the Prince of Wales.

In 2014 and to mark their 15th anniversary the Studio conceived a new exhibition about the Scottish Independence Referendum. Entitled The Auld Acquaintance and featuring cartoons from around the world, the exhibition was shown in five locations: Centre International de la Caricature, du Dessin de Presse et d'Humour, Saint-Just-le-Martel; The Guardian News & Media Gallery, London; Leiper Fine Art, Glasgow; Institut de Estudis Illerdencs, Lleida; Faculté de Droit et des Sciences Économiques, Université de Limoges.

In 2016/17 the People's Palace & Winter Gardens will show a 10-year retrospective of works from the Studio's Fizzers collection.
