= We3 =

Comic book series

Publication information
- Publisher: Vertigo Comics
- Schedule: Monthly
- Format: Miniseries
- Publication date: 2004
- No. of issues: 3
- Main character(s): 1 (Bandit); 2 (Tinker); 3 (Pirate)

Creative team
- Written by: Grant Morrison
- Artist(s): Frank Quitely; Jamie Grant
- Letterer: Todd Klein

Collected editions
- We3: ISBN 1-4012-0495-3

We3 is a three-issue American comic book miniseries by writer Grant Morrison and artist Frank Quitely, who describe its kinetic style as "Western Manga". It was published in 2004 by the Vertigo imprint of DC Comics, with a trade paperback released in 2005.

== Plot ==
We3, a squad of three prototype "animal weapons", are part of a government project headed by Dr. Rosanne Berry and her superior Doctor Trendle. The group consists of a male dog, "Bandit" a.k.a. "1"; a female cat, "Tinker" a.k.a. "2"; and a male rabbit, "Pirate" a.k.a. "3", who were all kidnapped from a nearby city and encased in robotic armor. They have also been given a limited ability to speak through skull implants. Their body armor fields numerous weapons, including mine laying devices, machine guns and razor claws.

After the group carries out another successful assignment of assassinating U.S. enemies, a senator makes a visit to the project's facility to see it, where he congratulates the project staff members, only for the General in charge of the project to decide afterwards to decommission We3 in favor of creating newer animal weapons. Berry, unwilling to end the lives of the three animals, instead has them break free. Feeling guilt over her part in what has been done to them, she hopes to be killed by them in the process of their escape; to her surprise, they leave her alive. She is taken into custody by the government while Trendle works closely with the General and the military to terminate We3.

We3 escape into the wild and, confused by their new surroundings, decide to look for "HOME". They are later found and chased by the military, but thanks to their cybernetic enhancements and the soldiers ignoring Trendle’s advice, they manage to kill the pursuers. Trendle decides to send his cybernetic enhanced rats to attack We3, telling Berry that if the rats fail the military will use her to lure We3 back. While fighting the rats on a bridge, Pirate drops several landmines after spotting an oncoming train. The mines destroy part of the bridge, causing first the train, then Bandit and Tinker, to all fall into the water below. Bandit attempts to rescue the conductor, but Tinker points out that the man is already dead. Pirate is nowhere to be seen.

Bandit and Tinker manage to find Pirate, but Pirate is in a confrontation with a family who mistake Pirate for an alien. Pirate ends up getting shot in the head by the father, damaging his speech. Angered, Bandit and Tinker kill the father and the family's dog, but leave the boy alive. Realizing that the situation is getting far worse, the military again ignore Trendle’s advice by sending out We4, an enhanced English Mastiff, against the wishes of Berry.

We3 take refuge in a homeless man's domain and gain his sympathy. The homeless man encounters the military who have the police escort him from the area, while the man claims that he didn't see anything. Setting up around the area, the military unleash We4, who kills Pirate but is in turn damaged by one of Pirate's mines in the process. Berry is then sent by the military to calm Bandit and lead him into military sniper fire, but as the snipers prepare to take out Bandit, she instead tells him his real name and sacrifices herself by jumping in the way of the sniper bullets. Enraged, Bandit and Tinker both brutally attack We4 and all combatants end up breaking through a wall onto the highway, causing a car pile up. We4 begins to attack a police officer whom Bandit then rescues. At Trendle's insistence, the military terminate We4 from afar using a code word to trigger a bomb in We4's head.

Bandit and Tinker escape and, with painful effort, shed their armor, leaving it to explode and taking out some more soldiers on their trail. The homeless man manages to find them again and he removes the two's remaining cybernetic enhancements. Trendle then speaks out against the government's actions, and it is revealed that the now normal Bandit and Tinker have been taken into the care of the homeless man. As he compliments how well behaved the animals are, Trendle gives hundreds of dollars to the homeless man before walking up the steps of the courthouse to a crowd of reporters.

== Collected editions ==
The miniseries has been collected as a trade paperback, titled We3 (104 pages, Vertigo, 2005 ISBN 1-4012-0495-3).

In 2011, a deluxe hardcover edition was released consisting of 144 pages.

In November 2025, a collected edition was released as part of the DC Compact Comics line.

== Adaptations ==
=== Film ===
In 2006, New Line Cinema optioned We3 as a film project with Morrison attached as screenwriter. The script was completed, and Don Murphy, Susan Montford and Rick Benattar remain attached as producers with the film currently in development. The cybernetic animals were to be completely computer-generated.

John Stevenson, director of Kung Fu Panda was attached to the project as a director in December 2008, and New Line Cinema was no longer involved.

When asked during an impromptu Facebook Q&A in March 2015 on what other comic book film he would like to make, James Gunn expressed interest in We3. Elements of We3 were incorporated into his 2023 feature film Guardians of the Galaxy Vol. 3.
