= Northern Lightz =

Scottish adult humour comic

Northern Lightz was a Scottish adult humour underground comic that ran from 1999 to 2005. Consisting primarily of drug humour, the title featured underground cartoonists Dave Alexander, Pudsy, Jim Stewart, Jamie Grant John Miller and many others, and could be seen as a partial successor to Electric Soup. Later issues were under the editorship of Alan Grant. After 11 issues, the comic ceased publication in 2005, succeeded by Grants highstreet dope humour title Wasted in 2008.
