= Super Crooks =

2021 Japanese American adult animated superhero original net anime series

- Promotional poster
- Genre: Superhero
- Based on: Supercrooks by: Mark Millar; Leinil Francis Yu
- Written by: Dai Satō; Tsukasa Kondō
- Directed by: Motonobu Hori
- Voices of: Kenjiro Tsuda; Maaya Sakamoto; Yasushi Kimura; Junichi Suwabe; Eiji Takemoto; Subaru Kimura; Kenn
- Theme music composer: Towa Tei
- Opening theme: "Alpha" by Towa Tei with Taprikk Sweezee
- Ending theme: "Sugar" by Towa Tei with UA
- Composer: Towa Tei
- Countries of origin: Japan; United States
- Original languages: Japanese; English
- No. of seasons: 1
- No. of episodes: 13

Production
- Executive producers: Mark Millar; Masahiko Minami; Rui Kyo
- Producer: Yoshihiro Oyabu
- Cinematography: Tsuyoshi Kanbayashi
- Editor: Kumiko Sakamoto
- Production companies: Millarworld; Bones

Original release
- Network: Netflix
- Release: November 25, 2021

Related
- Jupiter's Legacy

Super Crooks is an adult animated superhero original net animation series based on the 2012 Marvel comic book series of the same name by Mark Millar and Leinil Francis Yu. The series was written by Dai Satō and Tsukasa Kondo, and premiered on Netflix on November 25, 2021. Following small-time crook Johnny Bolt as he recruits a team of eight super-villains to perform a super-powered heist, the first nine episodes serve as a prequel to the comic book series, with the last four episodes adapting the comic outright. The series serves as a spin-off to Jupiter's Legacy (2021). In June 2021, a live-action Super Crooks series and second spin-off from the simultaneously-cancelled Jupiter's Legacy was announced to be in active development.

== Premise ==
Small-time crook Johnny Bolt recruits a team of eight super-villains to perform a super-powered heist.

== Characters ==
Johnny Bolt (ジョニー・ボルト, Jonī Boruto)
Voiced by: Kenjiro Tsuda (Japanese); Jonah Scott (English)
Johnny Bolt is the main protagonist and a two-bit crook looking to pull off the ultimate heist. He originally wanted to be a hero, but after accidentally causing a chain reaction of deaths after scaring patrons at a pool when he fell in and electrocuted those in it, he switched to petty larceny to get by.
Kasey (ケイシー, Keishī)
Voiced by: Maaya Sakamoto (Japanese); Abby Trott (English)
Johnny's girlfriend. She has power to implant illusions in people's minds, akin to the power of suggestion. Despite Johnny's bad habit of never listening to her, they have a strong and genuine romance.
Carmine (カーマイン, Kāmain) / The Heat (ザ・ヒート, Za Hīto)
Voiced by: Yasushi Kimura (Japanese); Doug Stone (English)
A famous criminal from the 1970s during his youth. Unlike the rest of the crooks, he has no powers; he instead uses flamethrower gear like Heat Wave. He taught Kasey that pulling off one great heist instead making a living from them was the better move; Heat only ever showed up once a decade to refresh the terror of villainy when things got too dull.
Gladiator (グラディエーター, Guradiētā)
Voiced by: Pierre Taki (Japanese); Cam Clarke (English)
A middle-aged hero whom often cheats on his husband. He is convinced to help the heist after Johnny tricks him into a fake date; Gladiator having sent nude pictures, which serve as blackmail. Despite this fault, Gladiator holds onto a Hero's code and feels disgusted with Praetorian.
Josh (ジョシュ, Joshu) / The Ghost (ザ・ゴースト, Za Gōsuto)
Voiced by: Junichi Suwabe (Japanese); Bill Butts (English)
A sophisticated criminal with the power to phase through solid objects.
TK McCabe (TK・マッケイブ, TK Makkeibu)
Voiced by: Eiji Takemoto (Japanese); Bill Rogers (English)
A small time thief with the power of telekinesis.
Sammy Diesel (サミー・ディーゼル, Samī Dīzeru)
Voiced by: Subaru Kimura (Japanese); Ben Pronsky (English)
The younger of the Diesel brothers. He has the power of regeneration, allowing him to instantly heal from any injury, regrow lost body parts, and even survive being dismembered.
Roddy Diesel (ロディ・ディーゼル, Rodi Dīzeru)
Voiced by: Tetsu Inada (Japanese); Bruno Oliver (English)
The elder of the Diesel brothers. He shares his younger brother's power of regeneration. He possesses a degree in quantum mechanics and wants to fund Time travel.
Forecast (フォアキャスト, Foakyasuto)
Voiced by: KENN (Japanese); Zeno Robinson (English)
A small time crook with the power to manipulate the weather. His goal with his share is to study meteorology in order to fine tune his powers.
Praetorian (プレトリアン, Puretorian)
Voiced by: Wataru Hatano (Japanese); D. C. Douglas (English)
A brutal anti-hero and the secondary antagonist. He randomly gets powers every day which lasts for only 24 hours.
Salamander (サラマンダー, Saramandā)
Voiced by: Hisao Egawa (Japanese); Matthew David Rudd (English)
Matts' right-hand man and successor as head of The Network.
Christopher Matts/The Bastard (クリストファー・マッツ, Kurisutofā Mattsu)
Voiced by: Hiroshi Yanaka (Japanese); Jason Marnocha (English)
A longtime crime boss in charge of The Network, akin to the Kingpin and the main antagonist. His name comes from his style of revenge: exploding the heads of loved ones of whoever crosses him, no matter how small the offenses.

== Episodes ==
No.	Title	Directed by	Written by	Storyboarded by	Original release date
1	"Electro Boy"	Motonobu Hori	Dai Satō	Motonobu Hori	November 25, 2021
Johnny Bolt discovers that he has electrical powers and plans a debut as a local superhero. His debut goes wrong when a ridiculing classmate recognizes him, causing him to lose focus and fall into a public swimming pool, electrocuting everyone in there with a lethal shockwave. Traumatized by the incident and disillusioned with his powers, Johnny decides that he will be a supervillain instead.
2	"Kasey"	Kazuo Miyake	Dai Satō	Motonobu Hori	November 25, 2021
Years later, Johnny is released from the specialized prison Supermax where he reunites with his girlfriend Kasey, another villain with the power to create illusions. Sensing Johnny's eagerness to return to a life of crime, Kasey instead encourages Johnny to lie low and wait for a heist that will enable them to retire comfortably, though Johnny ignores her advice and is instead encouraged by his super-powered crook friends to pull off a small scale jewel robbery in San Francisco.
3	"Man Mountain"	Satoshi Takafuji	Tsukasa Kondō	Motonobu Hori	November 25, 2021
During the crew's getaway they are intercepted by two superheroes, Man Mountain and Rubberball, both of whom indirectly destroy parts of the city and harm innocent bystanders. The crew takes them down by combining their powers. As they begin to cross Golden Gate Bridge, The Praetorian, one of the strongest superheroes of the Union of Justice, arrives.
4	"The Praetorian"	Tetsuya Miyanishi	Dai Satō	Tetsuya Miyanishi	November 25, 2021
Facing the Praetorian, the group splits up and attempts to flee, but he uses his seemingly endless powers to brutally incapacitate each member of the team. Cornering Johnny in a car park, the Praetorian appears to suddenly change his mind and instead gives Johnny and his friends a second chance. The group is then picked up by Kasey who berates them for their recklessness and reveals that she used her powers on Praetorian to convince him to let the group go. Returning home, Kasey threatens to leave Johnny unless he stops wasting his life on small-scale jobs, revealing that her former mentor and legendary villain The Heat is planning a massive heist that will enable them to retire from the villain business.
5	"The Heat"	Masashi Abe	Dai Satō	Hiroaki Takagi	November 25, 2021
Johnny and Kasey travel to The Heat's launderette factory in Chicago to meet him, where it is revealed that The Heat's real name is Carmine, using the factory as a front. Inside the pair meet the rest of Carmine's crew: The Ghost, a cynical and uptight villain from Greece with the power to phase through matter, and the Diesel Brothers Sammy and Roddy, two wrestlers with the power to regenerate body parts and heal wounds. Carmine tells the group that they require another member: TK McCabe, a telekinetic pickpocket who was recently arrested in Miami by the superhero Gladiator.
6	"The Gladiator"	Yōhei Shindō	Tsukasa Kondō	Masahiro Andō	November 25, 2021
Carmine, Johnny, and the rest of the crew travel to Miami where they steal a private jet to intercept the high-security military plane transporting TK to Supermax. The Ghost uses his powers to enter the transport and subdues the guards while Roddy Diesel fights Gladiator, who strapped himself on top of the plane for extra security measures. While Gladiator is eventually defeated by Roddy and Kasey, Ghost is unable to unlock TK's restraints. In response, Johnny uses his powers to fry the plane's circuits, sending it plummeting toward the ocean.
7	"The Supermax"	Naoto Uchida	Tsukasa Kondō	Naoto Uchida	November 25, 2021
The Ghost convinces security on the plane that TK's telekinesis is the only thing that can stop the plane from crashing, and they reluctantly give him the code to free him. Escaping the scene, the group reconvenes at a hotel where the final member, Forecast, a villain who can manipulate the weather, arrives. Carmine reveals that they plan to steal the Helmet of Count Orlock from The Union of Justice's headquarters, a privately funded heist organized by Orlock himself independent of the powerful supervillain organization The Network, run by the ruthless psychic Christopher "The Bastard" Matts. Initially hesitant, every member of the group agrees to the heist.
8	"The Union of Justice"	Tetsuya Miyanishi	Dai Satō	Tetsuya Miyanishi	November 25, 2021
Johnny and Kasey spend the night at a hotel, where they reminisce on their first heist together; Johnny promises to propose to Kasey after the heist. By the next morning, the various members of the team begin to enact their roles, with Johnny, Carmine, the Diesel Brothers, Josh, and Kasey entering the Union of Justice, while TK and Forecast use their powers to animate a massive group of zombies on location. The heist goes well and the group retrieves the helmet but Praetorian, who was in the restroom, recognizes Kasey's psychic powers from their prior encounter, knocks her out, and confronts the group, blowing their cover and sending the building into lockdown.
9	"Count Orlok"	Kazuo Miyake	Dai Satō	Hideyuki Satake	November 25, 2021
The Union Members arrive at the horde of zombies and fight them back. TK and Forecast attempt to prolong the encounter but are forced to flee when Gladiator arrives to evacuate the citizens. At the Union of Justice, the Praetorian reveals that the Helmet in their possession is a replica and the actual helmet is stored in the Union's underground vault. During the fight, Praetorian murders multiple bystanders with his powers and is only stopped when Ghost travels down to the lower levels and retrieves the authentic helmet, which he uses to teleport the crew to Carmine's safehouse at Black Rock. Carmine reveals that years ago he, Count Orlock, and Matts attempted to form a rival organization to the Union for supervillains. It fell apart due to the Matts' resentment of Orlock. Matts then formed the Network so he could run the villain world without having to deal with anyone countering his authority as Orlock did. The group celebrates their success and awaits Orlock's arrival, but Praetorian instead arrives with Matts, revealing that he is a double agent for the Network inside the Union. The Praetorian then freezes the crew in place as Matts collects their money. Orlock then arrives to congratulate the group but is immediately killed by Matts, with Matts and Praetorian taking Orlock's helmet and the money promised to the group, leaving the crew bloodied and defeated.
10	"Carmine"	Yōhei Shindō	Tsukasa Kondō	Motonobu Hori	November 25, 2021
Depressed and resentful at their failure, the crew goes their separate ways, with Johnny and Kasey returning home. When Kasey suffers a breakdown due to her anger at the Network and sorrow at their failure, Johnny impulsively proposes to her. The two plan their wedding, though Johnny realizes he is not ready to leave behind a life of crime on his stag night he is teleported and reunited with his old group of friends who convince him to pull one last job with them before he leaves crime forever. Johnny drunkenly agrees and on the morning of the wedding the group robs a chain of jewelers again, but Praetorian sabotages their getaway, and the group is forced to flee on the Subway where Johnny is caught by Gladiator and the police. At the church Kasey realizes what has happened and burns her wedding dress, leaving the venue and her relationship with Johnny behind. Johnny is once again locked in Supermax where he pleads with the guards for a chance to call Kasey to no avail. Five years later, a reformed Johnny leaves prison, intent on repairing his relationship with Kasey and abandoning crime for good. Meanwhile, a now-disgraced Praetorian has come under controversy for the collateral damage caused during the fight at the Union of Justice. Despite being acquitted of the crimes by his lawyer, he has lost his place at the Union of Justice. Johnny finds Kasey working a dead-end job at a coffee shop, with Kasey rebuffing Johnny, refusing to talk to him until a beaten and weary Carmine arrives. For the previous five years, Carmine had been running card counting scams at various casinos until being caught by the new head of the Network "The Salamander", Matts's second-in-command whom he left in charge of the Network after his retirement. Now in debt to the Network for $100 million, Carmine begs Johnny and Kasey for help.
11	"Casino Grand Granite"	Satoshi Takafuji	Tsukasa Kondō	Satoshi Takafuji	November 25, 2021
Kasey attempts to acquire a fake passport for Carmine so that he can flee the country with a new identity, while Johnny and Carmine reassemble their old crewmates for one final heist: robbing Matts' private island in Japan and making off with his entire fortune of untold millions stored inside a 4-dimensional briefcase. They are joined by a reluctant Kasey after having an epiphany about her notoriety. Before the mission can begin, Johnny recruits one last member: Gladiator, who is secretly having affairs with other men behind his husband's back. Johnny threatens to leak this story to the world as well as offering Gladiator a chance to get revenge on Praetorian, whose lengthy trial and controversy harmed Gladiator's public image by association, also revealing that he is now working for Matts. Enraged by Praetorian's betrayal, Gladiator begrudgingly agrees and the crew travel to Matt's private island to begin the heist.
12	"The Bastard"	Tetsuya Miyanishi	Dai Satō	Tetsuya Miyanishi	November 25, 2021
The group begins reconnaissance with Kasey and Roddy infiltrating Matt's house disguised as scientists, where Kasey uses her powers to perform a psychic scan of the entire facility and the underground maze leading to the briefcase. After successfully mapping a path, Kasey announces her intentions to return to America now that her role is played. That night on the beach, Johnny reconciles with her and convinces her of his new perspective, swearing that this will be their last ever job. The group begins the heist the next morning, though Kasey has left for the airport. Unable to use their powers at first due to the alarms and superpower repression devices within the facility. After successfully rebooting the island's servers the group begins to make their way through the network of traps to the briefcase. Kasey begins to have second thoughts about abandoning the group, but before she can make a decision, she is captured by Matts and the Praetorian.
13	"Super Crooks"	Motonobu Hori & Yōhei Shindō	Dai Satō	Motonobu Hori & Naoto Uchida	November 25, 2021
Johnny and the crew successfully survive the network of traps and guards protecting the briefcase, retrieved by Carmine using his flamethrowers. As they escape, Matts reboots the security system and reveals that he has tied up Kasey in his office, before sending Praetorian down to stop the crew. Praetorian once again defeats the group with ease, but is surprised by Gladiator's presence, who is one of the few heroes stronger than himself. Gladiator overpowers Praetorian and beats him heavily for his massacre of innocents and desecration of the Union's reputation, leaving him alive but brain damaged. The group then makes their escape while Matts engages in a psychic duel with the tied-up Kasey, eventually winning and killing her. However, he is shocked to find that the whole experience was one of Kasey's illusions, having been fooling him since the airport. The crew escapes the island with the briefcase and, after they each collect their share of the money, go their separate ways. Carmine returns to gambling, TK takes his family on holiday with a private yacht, Roddy and Forecast invest their shares into personal scientific endeavors, Sammy becomes a playboy and spends his money on drugs and prostitutes, and Ghost uses his share to become a wealthy real estate agent in his native Greece, using his money to buy a portion of the land. Gladiator confesses to his affairs and reconciles with his husband; his reputation and popularity surge. Meanwhile, Matts returns to the US and executes Salamander for "betraying" him and decides to return to the Network. By wearing the costumes used by Salamander and his associates, Johnny's group framed him, with Matts inadvertently wiping Carmine's debt and enabling him to keep his entire share. Johnny and Kasey happily retire from crime and agree to remarry and restart their relationship.

== Production ==
Netflix first announced that the series was in production with Studio Bones in March 2019, and the series was ready for its world premiere at the Annecy International Animation Film Festival in June 2021. At its premiere, director Motonobu Hori explained that because the series takes place, in part, before the comic book series, Mark Millar provided additional back story for Dai Satō to adapt, and Leinil Francis Yu provided younger character designs for Takashi Mitani to translate into animation. Towa Tei composed the music for the series.

The first nine episodes of the series serve as a prequel to the comics and then overlap with the comic storyline for the last four episodes, which serves as a straightforward adaptation, with the series also set in the same fictional universe as the live-action series Jupiter's Legacy. In June 2021, a live-action Supercrooks series and direct spin-off continuation of the simultaneously-cancelled Jupiter's Legacy was announced to be in active development.

== Release ==
At Netflix's Tudum event in September 2021, the primary voices from Kenjiro Tsuda and Maaya Sakamoto were revealed along with the release date of November 25, 2021.

== Reception ==
On the review aggregator website Rotten Tomatoes, 100% of 6 critics' reviews are positive, with an average rating of 7.7/10.
