= Supercrooks =

2012 comic book limited series

- Cover of collected edition for Supercrooks, art by Leinil Francis Yu.

Publication information
- Publisher: Icon Comics
- Format: Limited series
- Genre: Heist, superhero
- Publication date: March – August 2012
- No. of issues: 4

Creative team
- Written by: Mark Millar
- Penciller: Leinil Francis Yu
- Inker: Gerry Alanguilan
- Colorist: Sunny Gho

Supercrooks is a four-issue comic book limited series by writer Mark Millar and artist Leinil Francis Yu. The series was published by the Icon Comics imprint of Marvel Comics from March–August 2012.

== Plot ==
Johnny Bolt is a supervillain who tries to make money by committing robberies with other masked criminals. Each of these crimes fail due to the intervention of random superheroes. In Bolt's latest robbery, he is stopped by the Gladiator and is sentenced to five years in prison.

After serving his sentence, Bolt returns to his ex-girlfriend and ex-supervillain Kasey, who now works as a waitress. Despite having psychic powers, she wants to lead a normal life and doesn't want Bolt back romantically. During their reunion, an elderly supervillain friend of theirs named Carmine informs them that he has been forced to raise $100 million for a Las Vegas casino because he was caught cheating with a man who has the power of foresight.

To help his friend out, Bolt comes up with a new plan to make money, involving a heist outside the superhero-filled United States. His research shows that Spain does not have superheroes and has a suitable target: the greatest supervillain of all time, the Bastard, who possesses great telekinetic abilities and has amassed a billion-dollar fortune.

Bolt manages to convince many of his fellow supervillains, some of whom are not even active anymore, to join his team of Supercrooks against the Bastard. The group consists of Carmine, Kasey, the Phantom (an ex-burglar), TK McCabe (an ex-supervillain with telekinetic powers), Roddy and Sammy Diesel (two semi-indestructible wrestlers who fight clandestine matches), and Forecast (an ex-supervillain who is able to change the weather). After they all arrive in Tenerife, Bolt manages to surprise the team by introducing one more member, the Gladiator, who has been blackmailed into joining.

With the help of each team member, Bolt manages to break into the safe under the villa of the Bastard, making off with $800 million, or $100 million per Supercrook. To keep the Bastard at bay, Kasey uses her psychic powers to create the illusion of him being in his residence when in reality he is in another place.

To avoid retaliation by the Bastard, the Supercrooks carry out the robbery wearing the costumes of the supervillains to whom Carmine owed money, who are then tracked down and killed by the criminal boss, furious for the wrong he suffered.

== Release ==
The first issue of Supercrooks reached #51 of US comic book sales in March 2012, selling approximately 34,673 copies through Diamond Comic Distributors. World-wide sales of the first issue and additional copies sold after the first month reached up to 59,600 sales.

To promote sales of the series' book, Millar held a contest for bookstores. Under the contest rules, the store that purchased the most copies of Supercrooks #1 would have Mark Millar personally visit for a book signing. The National Book Store in Manila, Philippines, won the contest. Millar held the signing for the store in May 2012 alongside his Supercrooks collaborators, Filipino artists Yu and Alanguilan, and Indonesian colorist Gho.

== Reception ==
The comic series scored an average rating of 7.7 for the entire series based on 29 critic reviews aggregated by Comic Book Roundup. The series was generally praised for the artwork by Yu, but some reviewers found the characters unlikeable and forgettable. It was compared, both positively and negatively, to Ocean's Eleven with superheroes.

== Adaptations ==
Supercrooks adaptations were attempted on two occasions, prior to an adaptation being released in 2017. In 2011, before the book was published, it was optioned to be a film directed by Nacho Vigalondo. Those plans did not end up moving forward. Instead, in 2016, Waypoint Entertainment obtained the rights to develop a television series adaptation.

After Netflix acquired Millarworld in 2017, the company developed an anime series adaptation titled Super Crooks, which debuted in November 2021, and served as a prequel to the comic, before overlapping with it in the final episodes. In 2021, Netflix released a Jupiter's Legacy adaptation, another Millarworld title. By June, after Netflix had cancelled Jupiter's Legacy after one season, a live-action version of Supercrooks was revealed to be in development, as a spin-off of Jupiter's Legacy.
