= Jupiter's Legacy (TV series) =

2021 superhero television series

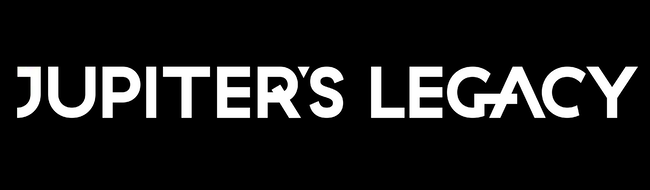
- Genre: Drama; Superhero
- Based on: Jupiter's Legacy by: Mark Millar; Frank Quitely
- Developed by: Steven S. DeKnight
- Showrunners: Steven S. DeKnight (Note: DeKnight was replaced by Kim as showrunner midway through production.); Sang Kyu Kim
- Starring: Josh Duhamel; Ben Daniels; Leslie Bibb; Andrew Horton; Elena Kampouris; Mike Wade; Matt Lanter
- Music by: Stephanie Economou
- Country of origin: United States
- Original language: English
- No. of seasons: 1
- No. of episodes: 8

Production
- Executive producers: Mark Millar; Frank Quitely; Lorenzo di Bonaventura; Dan McDermott; Steven S. DeKnight; James Middleton; Sang Kyu Kim
- Producers: Brook Worley; Morenike Balogun Koch; Steve Wakefield
- Cinematography: Danny Ruhlmann; Nicole Hirsch Whitaker
- Editors: Henk Van Eeghen; Josh Beal; Tirsa Hackshaw
- Camera setup: Single-camera
- Running time: 35–56 minutes
- Production companies: Millarworld; di Bonaventura Pictures; DeKnight Productions

Original release
- Network: Netflix
- Release: May 7, 2021

Related
- Super Crooks

Jupiter's Legacy is an American superhero television series that premiered on Netflix on May 7, 2021. Based on the 2013–2025 comic book series of the same name by Mark Millar and Frank Quitely, the show was developed for television by Steven S. DeKnight, who initially served as showrunner, but was replaced by Sang Kyu Kim midway through production. It stars Josh Duhamel, Ben Daniels, Leslie Bibb, Andrew Horton, Elena Kampouris, Mike Wade, and Matt Lanter. The series received mixed reviews from critics, and was canceled after one season, with a spin-off continuation, a live-action adaptation of the 2012 comic book Supercrooks, ordered to series to release 2021–2022, but was never produced as of December 2025. Super Crooks, an anime adaptation of Supercrooks set in the same fictional universe as Jupiter's Legacy, preceding the additional live-action series, was released to Netflix in November 2021.

== Synopsis ==
Shortly after his father's suicide in 1929, triggered by Black Thursday, former businessman Sheldon Sampson travels to an uncharted island in the Atlantic Ocean, where he, his brother Walter, and four others receive superpowers. He then creates a superhero team called the Union of Justice and his guiding ideals—never kill anyone, never interfere in political matters—remain unchanged over the near-century of his adventures as the Utopian.

However, the next generation of superheroes, including his children, struggle to live up to his rigid ideals and high expectations. When Sheldon's son, Brandon, seemingly kills one of their greatest foes to save Sheldon's life, it ignites a public debate over whether those ideals are still relevant.

== Cast and characters ==
=== Main ===
- Josh Duhamel as Sheldon Sampson / the Utopian, Grace's husband, Walter's younger brother, and the leader of the Union of Justice superhero team. He is the Superman archetype, with a similar powerset and morality.
- Ben Daniels as Walter Sampson / Brainwave, Sheldon's older brother, possessing psionic abilities, along with flight and super strength.
- Leslie Bibb as Grace Kennedy-Sampson / Lady Liberty, Sheldon's wife and one of the most powerful heroes on the planet. Acting as Sheldon's confidant, advising him with regards to modern change and parenting, she always voices her opinions even if they conflict with his.
- Andrew Horton as Brandon Sampson / Paragon, Grace and Sheldon's son, who struggles to meet his father's expectations.
- Elena Kampouris as Chloe Sampson, Grace and Sheldon's rebellious daughter, who is absorbed in a life of drugs and modeling, becomes cold and ruthless such as dismissing the deaths of her friends, and attacking them when they begin questioning if she cared for them.
- Mike Wade as Fitz Small / the Flare, one of the Union's most valued members, who has flight and can manipulate energy. At some point in the past he suffered a horrific injury fighting a supervillan, and is now a retired paraplegic. A skilled engineer and inventor, he developed most of the tech that has aided the Union.
- Matt Lanter as George Hutchence / Skyfox, Sheldon's closest friend and teammate before allegedly breaking the Code and turning against the Union. Since leaving the Union, he has not been seen.

=== Recurring ===
- Gracie Dzienny as Ruby Red, a superheroine who can create psionic armor around herself. She is also Brandon's ex-girlfriend.
- Tyler Mane as Blackstar, an extremely powerful supervillain seeking vengeance against the Sampsons, whose antimatter heart powers his exo-suit. Mane also portrays the Blackstar clone.
- Meg Steedle as Jane, Sheldon's ex-fiancée who leaves as he starts the voyage that led to him becoming a superhero.
- Richard Blackburn as Chester Sampson, Sheldon's and Walter's steel-magnate father who committed suicide on Black Thursday after using employee pensions to leverage company credit.
- Tenika Davis as Petra Small / the Flare II, Fitz's daughter and a superheroine who shares her father's powers. Despite coming to question the Code after fighting Blackstar's clone, she remains steadfast with her friends.
- Tyrone Benskin as Willie Small, Fitz's father and a worker at Chester's factory. He convinced Fitz to accept Sheldon's quest.
- Aiza Ntibarikure as Sierra / Ectoplex, a superhero who had plasma-based abilities, survivor's guilt, and resents Chloe for breaking off from the team.
- David Julian Hirsh as Richard Conrad / Blue Bolt, a member of the original Union who first used the power rod. He was a Red Cross doctor found adrift, rescued by Sheldon's party before helping the group gain their powers through the trials.
- Ian Quinlan as Hutch, George's son who uses Blue Bolt's teleportation rod to commit crimes with his crew, attaining materials to make a portal to find his father.
- Conrad Coates as Captain Borges, the captain of the ship Sheldon uses to travel the Atlantic.

=== Guest ===
- Sharon Belle as Iron Orchid, a supervillainess who uses a powered suit to rob banks.
- Stephen Oyoung as Barry / Tectonic, a superhero with vibration and geo-kinetic powers, as well as Brandon's best friend.
- Gregg Lowe as Briggs / Flaming Fist, a superhero with pyrokinetic abilities and one of Brandon's long-time friends.
- Kathryn Davis as Vera / Phase Out, a superhero with the ability to become invisible.
- Humberly González as Gabriella / Neutrino, a member of Hutch's crew who possesses electrokinetic abilities and Jacinda's lover.
- Jess Salgueiro as Jacinda / Shockwave, Gabriella's girlfriend who can emit shockwaves from her hands.
- Morgan David Jones as Jack Frost, a cryokinetic member of Hutch's crew who owns a magic van that once belonged to a magical supervillain.
- Kara Royster as Janna Croft / Ghost Beam, a friendly superhero who is old friends with Chloe.
- Robert Maillet as Big Man, a super-powered crime lord whom Hutch used to work for before killing him.
- Kurtwood Smith as Old Man Miller, a man with similar hallucinations as Sheldon's whom he encounters in Kansas after a long search.
- Franco Lo Presti as Nick of Time, a man with time-warping abilities who seduces Chloe in hopes of getting into the Union.
- Jake Lewis as Jay / Volcaner, a hero who can create and manipulate lava, who loses faith in the Code.
- Paul Amos as Dr. Barnabas Wolfe, a man with flight and inorganic matter-warping abilities which is an old acquaintance of the Union.
- Nigel Bennett as Dr. Jack Hobbs, one of the Utopian's old enemies, now serving as his imprisoned therapist.
- Chase Tang and Micah Karns as Baryon, a supervillain previously affiliated with Blackstar, who can create energy blasts.
- Anna Akana as Raikou, Walter's daughter, a vigilante/assassin possessing super strength and telepathy, who also uses ningato.

== Episodes ==
No.	Title	Directed by	Teleplay by	Original release date
1	"By Dawn's Early Light"	Steven S. DeKnight	Steven S. DeKnight	May 7, 2021
Present: Brandon and Chloe, Sheldon's grown children, struggle to live up to their father's legacy as a superhero known as The Utopian. While Chloe lives a hedonistic lifestyle, Brandon kills an escaped supervillain named Blackstar after he killed three junior superheroes, Tectonic, Flaming Fist, and Phase Out and nearly kills the Utopian and Lady Liberty. Blackstar's death ignites a debate over the ethics of killing supervillains. Past: In 1929, brothers Sheldon and Walter Sampson assist running their father's steel company. Following the crash, their father commits suicide.
2	"Paper and Stone"	Steven S. DeKnight	Henry G.M. Jones	May 7, 2021
Present: Upset that Brandon has violated his strict moral code, Sheldon attempts to convince younger superheroes and the public that his code is still relevant. Blackstar's supporters retaliate against the superheroes by becoming more violent, though Brandon killed a clone, not the real Blackstar. Past: Reporter Grace Kennedy draws Sheldon's ire by exposing his beloved father as an embezzler who stole from his employees, including a black man named Fitz Small. At his father's funeral, Sheldon is hospitalized following a seizure and is haunted by visions of a mysterious island.
3	"Painting the Clouds With Sunshine"	Christopher J. Byrne	Morenike Balogun Koch	May 7, 2021
Present: A gang of thieves indebted to the supervillain Big Man perform a series of heists. In a drunken stupor, Chloe accidentally stops one of their robberies and takes their loot. The thieves' leader, Hutch, kills Big Man to save himself and his friends, then uses Big Man's resources to retrieve what could be a powerful weapon. Past: After the funeral, Sheldon's family and friends become concerned about what looks to be his deteriorating mental state. Sheldon's best friend and optimistic playboy George Hutchence struggles to help him amid his own financial reversal.
4	"All the Devils Are Here"	Christopher J. Byrne	Akela Cooper	May 7, 2021
Present: Fired from her last endorsement and facing criticism from her former friends for not helping to fight Blackstar, Chloe descends further into addiction and partying. Past: Sheldon abandons his fiancée Jane to follow his visions. Led to a small town in Kansas ravaged by the Depression, Sheldon encounters Old Man Miller, who suffers from similar visions. Before killing himself, Miller warns Sheldon not to follow the advice given by dead loved ones in his visions.
5	"What's the Use?"	Charlotte Brändström	Kate Barnow	May 7, 2021
Present: Sheldon experiences doubts about his approach in enforcing his code. Evidence reveals that the Blackstar clone may have been created by George, who disappeared years ago after going rogue. Hutch and Chloe become a couple, but Sheldon questions Hutch about his father. Past: Encouraged by his visions, Sheldon convinces Walter, George, Grace, Fitz, and several others to journey with him to the island in 1933.
6	"Cover Her Face"	Charlotte Brändström	Sang Kyu Kim	May 7, 2021
Present: As Brandon struggles with the morality of his actions in the present, Grace nearly kills Baryon, a supervillain who has killed Ghost Beam, a friend of Chloe. Past: Sheldon's eccentricity causes his companions to question his sanity during a long sea voyage. As they attempt to turn back, Sheldon's doubts are quelled when he rescues Richard Conrad from a shipwreck and leads them through a dangerous storm to an island, all of which he saw in his visions.
7	"Omnes Pro Uno"	Marc Jobst	Julia Cooperman	May 7, 2021
Present: Grace overrules Sheldon and forces Walter to recruit his daughter Raikou, an assassin, to assist in telepathically searching the Blackstar clone's brain for clues. Sheldon becomes worried that dissension among the superheroes could lead to abandoning the code and brutal authoritarianism. Past: Sheldon leads the group to the island, where they are pushed to their physical and emotional limits. They nearly kill each other until Grace realizes this is a test of their worthiness. The group are pronounced worthy by ghosts of their loved ones and given superpowers.
8	"How it All Ends"	Marc Jobst	Steven S. DeKnight	May 7, 2021
The real Blackstar escapes from his cell, takes Brandon hostage, and forces Sheldon to choose between upholding his code or saving his son. As Sheldon hesitates, Fitz's daughter, Petra, distracts Blackstar. Brandon overpowers Blackstar and beats him, but stops short of killing him. Walter becomes trapped in the Blackstar clone's mind where George angrily accuses him of turning the others against him. Before George can kill Walter, Grace telepathically joins Walter and saves him. Once they escape, Walter confronts Raikou and kills her to keep his secrets: that he created the Blackstar clone and let the real Blackstar loose.

== Production ==
=== Development ===
On July 17, 2018, it was announced that Netflix had given the production a series order for an eight-episode first season. The series was developed by Steven S. DeKnight, who is credited as an executive producer alongside Lorenzo di Bonaventura and Dan McDermott. On September 16, 2019, it was confirmed that DeKnight departed the series as showrunner over creative differences in the midst of the production for the first season. DeKnight frequently clashed with Netflix executives during the production of the show, with the breaking point coming when he sought a budget of $12 million per episode, and was only given $9 million. In November 2019, it was announced that Sang Kyu Kim was taking over as showrunner, following DeKnight's exit from the series. Due to the change in leadership, the show would undergo a lengthy production pause, and afterwards a lengthy post-production, as Louis Leterrier was brought on for re-shoots to the earlier, DeKnight directed episodes, to make them tonally consistent with the later Sang Kyu Kim episodes. On June 2, 2021, it was reported that series will not be an ongoing series as the cast has been released. Mark Millar, who is credited as an executive producer, also stated that he's confident they will "return to it later". Despite replacing DeKnight as showrunner with Kim halfway through production, the show still ran massively over budget, totaling $200 million to produce, with its hefty price tag being one of the main factors in the decision to forgo a second season.

=== Casting ===
In February 2019, it was announced that Josh Duhamel, Ben Daniels, Leslie Bibb, Elena Kampouris, Andrew Horton, Mike Wade and Matt Lanter would star in the series. In April 2019, it was reported that Tenika Davis had been cast in a recurring role. In August 2019, it was reported that Chase Tang had been cast as a supervillain. In September 2020, Anna Akana was cast in a recurring role.

=== Filming ===
Principal photography for the first season was scheduled to initially commence in May 2019. Filming for the first season commenced in Toronto on July 2, 2019 and ended on January 24, 2020. Additional reshoots occurred in January 2021.

== Release ==
On February 24, 2021, a teaser trailer for the series was released. On April 7, 2021, Netflix released the official trailer for the series. The official trailer for the series features "Play God" by British artist Sam Fender. The series premiered on May 7, 2021.

== Reception ==
=== Critical response ===
Review aggregator Rotten Tomatoes assessed 52 reviews and determined 41% of them to be positive, with an average rating of 5.3/10. The website's critics consensus reads, "Despite some truly epic fights, Jupiter's Legacy is simply too overstuffed and slow-moving to land many narrative punches." According to review aggregator Metacritic, the series received "mixed or average reviews", based on a weighted average score of 45 out of 100 from 15 critic reviews.

David Griffin of IGN described Jupiter's Legacy as good, rating it a 7 out of 10, and writing that it "delivers plenty of exciting superhero action, compelling stories, and memorable characters."

=== Viewership ===
Jupiter's Legacy was the most-watched show on any streaming service during the week of May 3–9, 2021, garnering 696 million minutes of viewing for the whole season per Nielsen Corporation. The runner-up was The Handmaid's Tale with 690 million minutes of viewing. The show however ranked below the premiere of Netflix's last major series Shadow and Bone, which garnered 721 million minutes of viewership during the weekend it was released.

Jupiter's Legacy also topped the week of May 10–16, 2021, with 1.019 billion minutes viewed. It was followed by StartUp, which garnered 760 million minutes of viewing. The series suffered a decline of 60% for the week of May 17–23, with 405 million minutes being viewed. It was the third most-streamed original series and occupied the tenth spot overall in streaming rankings, including both films and TV shows.

In the week from May 24–30, the series ranked seventh overall in streaming rankings for shows with 214 million minutes viewed.

=== Cancellation ===
Despite the high viewership figures, the lackluster reception from critics and audiences prompted Netflix to not renew the show for a second season. Additionally, Netflix was undergoing an executive leadership change at the time with three senior executives leaving the company as the show was being produced. The new leadership personally soured on the project, mostly due to conflicts with the original show runner Stephen DeKnight, with the decision to cancel the show likely being made at the same time as DeKnight's departure, even if the first season was a success.

However, the single largest factor in the show's cancellation was its massive budget, coming in at nearly $200 million for the series.

== Super Crooks spin-offs ==
=== Anime ===
In March 2019, Netflix announced that a Supercrooks anime adaptation was in production with Studio Bones in March 2019, and the series was ready for its world premiere at the Annecy International Animation Film Festival in June 2021. At its premiere, director Motonobu Hori revealed that the series would be set in the same fictional universe as the live-action series Jupiter's Legacy.

=== Live-action series ===
In June 2021, simultaneously with the series' cancellation, a spin-off continuation of Jupiter's Legacy, a live-action Super Crooks adaptation separate from the anime series, was ordered to series for a 2021–2022 release, but was never produced.
