= Electric Soup =

- Format: Limited series
- Genre: see below
- Publication date: 1989 – 1992
- No. of issues: 1

Electric Soup is the title of a Scottish underground comic book series which was first published in 1989, and ran until 1992.

The title was an anthology title with its most notable strip being The Greens, (a parody of The Broons strip published by D.C Thomson) which was written and drawn by Frank Quitely. Other stories were written and drawn by Shug, Dave Alexander, (whose creations The MacBam brothers proved a popular feature) Tommy Somme, Gerbil and others.

Electric Soup was independently published and distributed round the Glasgow area to start with, but it received distribution though comic books shops before being snapped up by John Brown Publishing for UK distribution.

The humour was very Glaswegian in its strips, very akin to how Viz is full of geordie humour in many of its comic strips. The title was moderately successful but it was eventually cancelled after 17 issues. The MacBams storyline was continued in their own title, which lasted for one issue. A one-off Electric Soup 10th anniversary 18th edition was published in 1999, reuniting all of the original contributors. The last Greens strip from this one-off special was later reprinted in colour in Northern Lightz, another Scottish underground comic book, which carried further adventures of Alexanders MacBams and Shug's Wildebeest characters. Shug now known as Shug 90 now has his" Electric soup" characters"Rex and Tom/Polis Story and The Wildebeests" published in small press publication Khaki Shorts by Rob Miller.
