= American Jesus (disambiguation) =

"American Jesus" is a single by punk rock band Bad Religion from their album Recipe for Hate.

American Jesus may also refer to:

- "American Jesus", a 2005 song by Dean Gray off the album American Edit
- American Jesus: How the Son of God Became a National Icon, a 2003 book by Stephen Prothero
- American Jesus (comics), a 2004 Dark Horse comic book series by Mark Millar and Peter Gross
- 2013 American Jesus (film), with Frank Schaeffer, Keenan Smith, and others
