= Monty Nero =

Scottish comics writer (born 20th century)

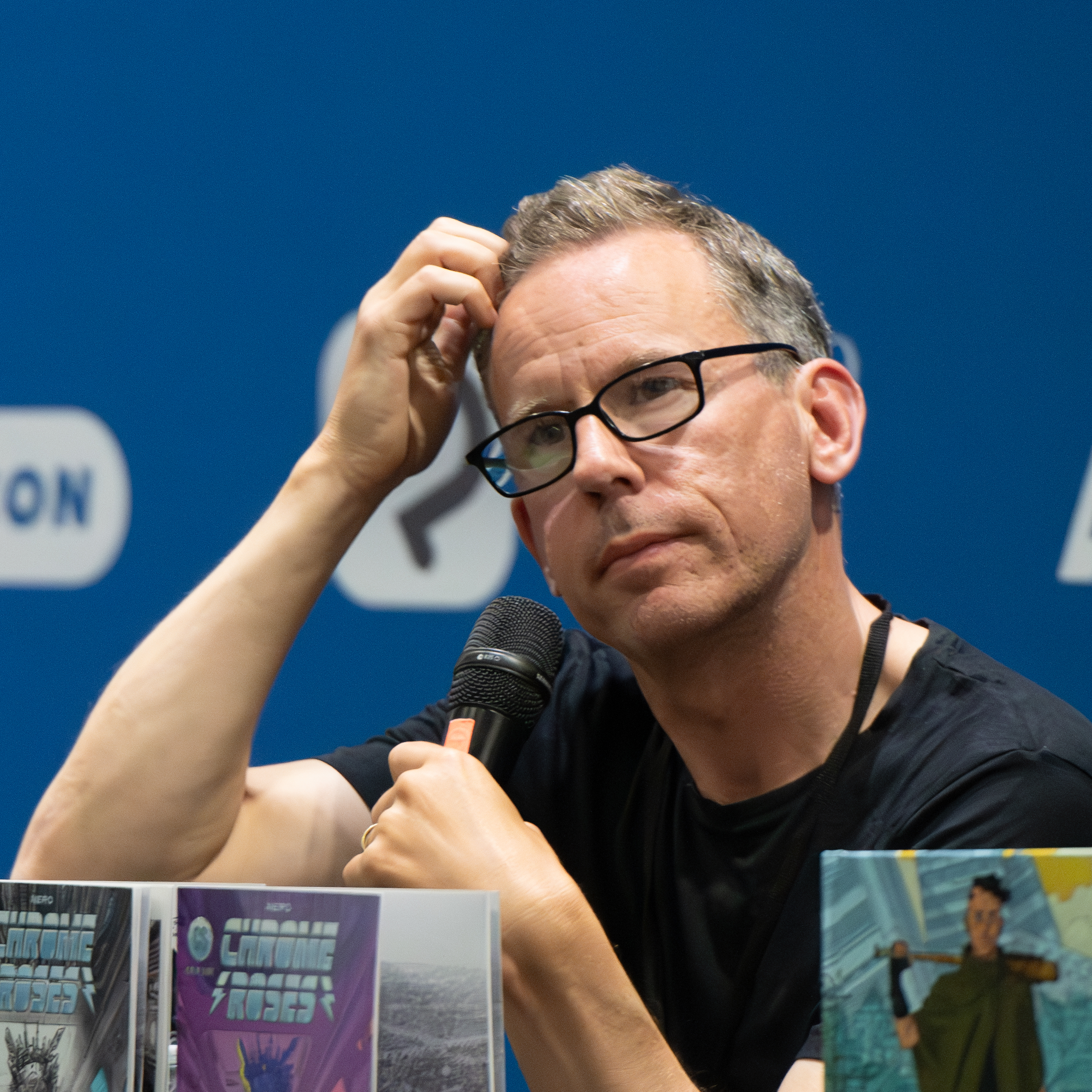
- At MCM Comic Con London, May 2025
- Born: 20th century Scotland
- Area: Writer
- Awards: Duncan of Jordanstone prize (University of Dundee)

Monty Nero (born 20th century) – also known as Montynero – is a Scottish writer of comic books, graphic novels, and stories published by Marvel Comics, DC Comics, Delcourt, 2000ad and Titan Comics.

He created the ongoing series Death Sentence with the artist Mike Dowling, first published by Titan Comics in 2013, as well as writing the superheroes X-Men and Hulk for Marvel Comics, the semi-autobiographical Hollow Monsters series, and Frenemies with the artist Yishan Li.

== Notable works ==
=== The death Sentence series ===
Death Sentence concerns a sexually transmitted virus which infects people with super powers and kills them in six months. The first series of comics, first published by Titan Comics in 2013, focuses on three main characters: Verity Fette, a bisexual graphic designer; Weasel, a drug-addicted rock star; and Monty, a celebrated comedian and film star. Art for the series was by co-creator Dowling, with covers by Nero and Dowling. It was collected and published as a hardback graphic novel by Titan in 2014, and was translated into French and published by Delcourt in 2015.

The second series, Death Sentence London, stars Verity Fette (now known as Artgirl), Weasel, Roots (an inner city drug-dealer) and Jeb (an American F.B.I. agent investigating the virus). Art for the series was by Martin Simmonds, with covers by Nero, Dowling, and Simmonds. It was collected and published as a softcover graphic novel by Titan in 2016.

The third series, Death Sentence Liberty, is ongoing and stars Verity/Artgirl, Roots, and Jeb. Art is by Simmonds and Nero, with covers by Ben Oliver, Luke Ross, and Nero.

==== Critical reaction ====
In his book The British Superhero (2017), Chris Murray describes Death Sentence as a "a sharp satire on politics and the relationship between the individual and the state...which easily takes its place among the best works of twentieth-first-century superhero stories". Nero's writing is often compared favorably in reviews and articles to the work of Grant Morrison, Alan Moore, Mark Millar, and Warren Ellis.

BuzzFeed described Death Sentence as "the best British comic in years." PopMatters referred to it as "a social analysis that exceeds the medium of comics, easily the equal of Dostoyevsky or Dickens."

On 24 December 2019, the Death Sentence series was named Dreamcage "Best Comic/Graphic Novel of the decade".

== Comics scholarship ==
Nero holds a Master of Design degree with Distinction from the University of Dundee, where he won the Duncan of Jordanstone prize for academic work.

He has written and presented papers on comics for academic conferences and journals, and collaborated with academics from around the world on comic projects.
