= The Chosen One (2023 TV series) =

Coming of age fantasy TV show

- Promotional poster
- Spanish: El Elegido
- Genre: Coming of age; Drama; Fantasy
- Based on: American Jesus by: Mark Millar; Peter Gross
- Developed by: Everardo Gout; Leopoldo Gout; Jorge Dorantes
- Directed by: Everardo Gout
- Starring: Bobby Luhnow; Dianna Agron; Lilith Amelie Siordia Mejia; Juan Fernando González Anguamea; Jorge Javier Arballo Osornio; Alberto Pérez-Jácome Kenna; Patricio Serna Meza; Carlos Bardem; Alejandro Edda; Alfonso Dosal; Sofía Sisniega; Eileen Yáñez; Tenoch Huerta
- Composers: Yamil Rezc; Andrés Sánchez; Gus Reyes
- Countries of origin: Mexico; United States
- Original languages: Spanish; English

Production
- Executive producers: Stacy Perskie; Stephanie Correa; Jorge Dorantes; Mark Millar; Peter Gross; Everardo Gout; Leopoldo Gout
- Editors: Adriana Martínez; Agustina Hernández; Eduardo Palenque; Laura Palotini
- Running time: 35-48 minutes
- Production companies: Millarworld; Redrum

Original release
- Network: Netflix
- Release: August 16, 2023

The Chosen One (Spanish: El Elegido) is a fantasy television series developed by Everardo and Leopoldo Gout, and Jorge Dorantes for Netflix. The series is based on the 2004–23 comic book series American Jesus (initially titled Chosen) by Mark Millar and Peter Gross, and follows a boy who discovers he has the abilities of Jesus Christ. Unlike the source material, the show takes place in Mexico rather than the United States. The series features an ensemble cast starring Bobby Luhnow, Dianna Agron, Lilith Amelie Siordia Mejia, Juan Fernando González Anguamea, Jorge Javier Arballo, Alejandro Edda, Alberto Pérez-Jácome Kenna, Patricio Serna Meza, Carlos Bardem, Alfonso Dosal, Sofía Sisniega, Eileen Yáñez, and Tenoch Huerta. It released on August 16, 2023.

== Premise ==
Jodie, a twelve-year-old boy in Baja California, suddenly discovers he has Jesus-like powers: he can turn water into wine, make the crippled walk, and, perhaps, even raise the dead, which he does on at least two occasions. As the Evangelical and the Yaquí leaders in town try to get him to use his powers to save humankind, all Jodie wants to do initially is to impress the girl he likes and stand up to his bullies. As Jodie struggles and eventually comes to terms with his destiny as a channel for higher powers, everything gets thrown for a loop when he discovers the truth around his identity.

— Netflix

The series ends with a puzzle: is he a force for good or evil, and will a great war between these forces take place?

== Cast ==
- Bobby Luhnow as Jodie
- Dianna Agron as Sarah
- Lilith Amelie Siordia Mejia (credited as Lilith Curiel) as Magda
- Juan Fernando González Anguamea as Tuka
- Jorge Javier Arballo Osornio as Hipólito
- Alberto Pérez-Jácome Kenna as Wagner
- Patricio Serna Meza as Angelo
- Carlos Bardem as Father Cruz
- Alfonso Dosal
- Sofía Sisniega
- Eileen Yáñez
- Tenoch Huerta as Lemuel

== Episodes ==
No.	Title	Directed by	Written by	Original release date
1	"The Arrival"	Everardo Gout	Teleplay by : Everardo Gout & Leopoldo Gout and Jorge Dorantes; Story by : Jorge Dorantes and Everardo Gout & Leopoldo Gout	August 16, 2023
2	"Miracles?"	Everardo Gout	Iturri Sosa and Jorge Dorantes	August 16, 2023
3	"The Awakening"	Everardo Gout	Kevin Rodriguez and Jorge Dorantes	August 16, 2023
4	"True or False?"	Everardo Gout	Tina de la Torre and Jorge Dorantes	August 16, 2023
5	"Faith"	Everardo Gout	Jorge Dorantes and Kevin Rodriguez	August 16, 2023
6	"Revelation"	Everardo Gout	Jorge Dorantes and Everardo Gout & Leopoldo Gout	August 16, 2023

== Production ==
What they've done with this is just masterful... It looks like Roma or City of God, a six-part series of absolute beauty and I've loved every second of this... [the show is] a horror story, but also a coming of age and has a Stand by Me vibe...

— Mark Millar, co-creator of the show's source material, Chosen (American Jesus).

Initially, Mark Millar and Peter Gross' Millarworld comic book trilogy Chosen (American Jesus) was set to be adapted into a feature film in March 2009, with Matthew Vaughn to direct, and produce under his Marv Films banner with Kris Thykier, after collaborating with Millar on Kick-Ass (2010). However, Vaughn denied he was directing the movie, and claimed to have only been discussing with Millar. Waypoint Entertainment was also to be involved, and attempted to restart the project in 2016.

In July 2018, a multilingual television series adaptation of the comic was announced (alongside other Millarworld properties) for Netflix, with Everardo and Leopoldo Gout serving as showrunners and executive producers, with the former also directing.

Principal photography was set to begin sometime in spring 2020, but was delayed due to the COVID-19 pandemic. Filming eventually commenced on April 25, 2022, in Baja California in Mexico. On June 16, 2022, a van accident occurred outside the set that killed two cast members, and injured six crew members from the show, as a result of a new driver going at high speeds combined with a majority of the passengers not wearing seatbelts, leading production company Redrum to suspend production temporarily. Additionally, a writer on the show, Rick Zazueta, had claimed in a Facebook post that other cast members had expressed concerns over "logistical and transportation issues" prior to the accident.

The series had its first look at the 2022 Netflix Tudum event, where Tenoch Huerta and Dianna Agron were announced as part of the cast.

== Release ==
In March 2023, Netflix officially announced the series, on top of revealing a new poster artwork. In June, the first teaser trailer premiered at that year's Tudum event.

The Chosen One streamed all six episodes worldwide on August 16, 2023.

== Reception ==
On review aggregator website Rotten Tomatoes, the series holds an 86% approval rating with an average rating of 6.3/10 based on 7 reviews.
