= Mark Millar =

Scottish comic book writer (born 1969)

Mark Millar MBE
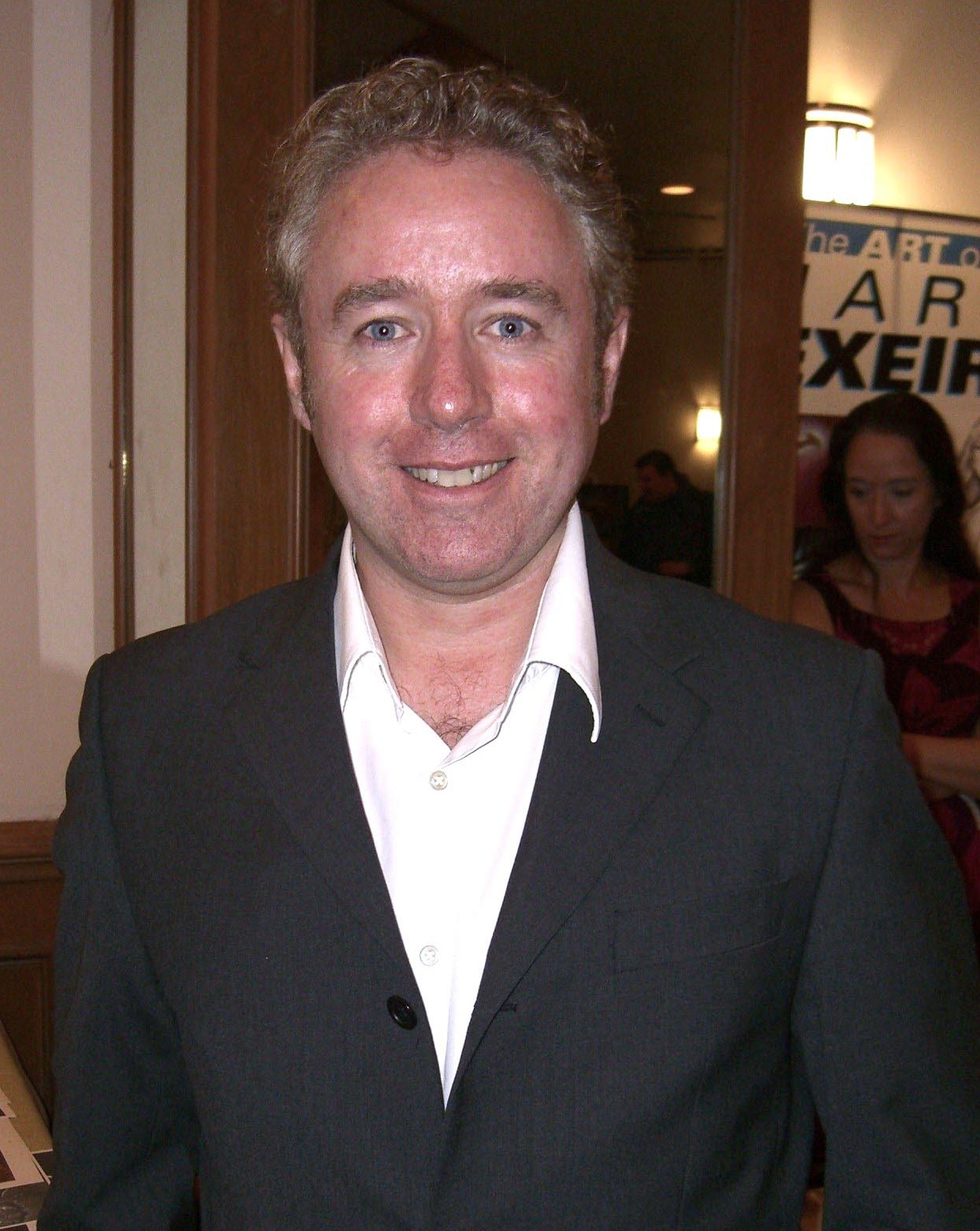
- Millar at the Big Apple Convention in Manhattan, 2 October 2009
- Born: 25 December 1969 (age 56) Coatbridge, Lanarkshire, Scotland
- Area: Writer
- Notable works: The Authority; Ultimate X-Men; The Ultimates; Superman: Red Son; Wanted; Ultimate Fantastic Four; Civil War; Wolverine: Old Man Logan; Kick-Ass; Kingsman

Mark Millar (/ˈmɪlər/; born 24 December 1969) is a Scottish comic book writer who first came to prominence with a run on the superhero series The Authority, published by DC Comics' Wildstorm imprint. Millar has written extensively for Marvel Comics, including runs on The Ultimates (which has been called "the comic book of the decade" by Time magazine and described as a major inspiration for the 2012 film The Avengers by its screenwriter Zak Penn), X-Men, Fantastic Four and Avengers for Marvel's Ultimate imprint, as well as Marvel Knights Spider-Man and Wolverine. In 2006, Millar wrote the Civil War mini-series that served as the centrepiece for the eponymous company-wide crossover storyline and later inspired the Marvel Studios film Captain America: Civil War. The "Old Man Logan" storyline, published as part of Millar's run on Wolverine, served as the inspiration for the 2017 film Logan.

Millar has written numerous creator-owned series which have been published under the unified Millarworld label, including Wanted with J. G. Jones, Kick-Ass with John Romita, Jr., Nemesis with Steve McNiven, Superior and Supercrooks with Leinil Francis Yu, The Secret Service with Dave Gibbons and Jupiter's Legacy with Frank Quitely. Some of these series have been adapted into live-action and animated series and feature films, such as Wanted, Kick-Ass, Kingsman: The Secret Service, Jupiter's Legacy and Super Crooks, as well as video games such as Wanted: Weapons of Fate and Kick-Ass: The Game.

In addition to his work as a writer, Millar serves as an executive producer on all film and television adaptations of his comics. Between 2012 and 2016, he was employed by 20th Century Fox as a creative consultant for adaptations of Marvel properties.

In 2013, Millar was appointed a Member of the Most Excellent Order of the British Empire (MBE) for services to film and literature.

== Early life ==
Millar was born on 24 December 1969 in Coatbridge, Scotland. He spent the first half of his life in the town's Townhead area and attended St. Ambrose High School.

Millar has four older brothers, and one older sister, who are 22, 20, 18, 16 and 14 years older than him, respectively. He was first introduced to comic books at age 4 by his brother Bobby, who at the time was attending university and, as of 2010, worked at a special needs school. The first comics that Millar read were the seminal The Amazing Spider-Man #121, which featured the death of Gwen Stacy, and a Superman book purchased by Bobby that day. Millar's interest in the medium was further cemented with the black-and-white reprints of other comics that his brothers purchased for him, which he enjoyed so much that he drew a spider web across his face with an indelible marker that his parents were unable to scrub off in time for his First Communion photo a week later.

In the mid-late 1970s, Millar frequently appeared as a guest on the long-running Scottish kids TV programme Glen Michael's Cartoon Cavalcade, which he was a regular fan of at the time. On one occasion, he was invited onto the show to talk about the history of comics and, in a 2010 interview with the Scottish newspaper Daily Record, Millar has stated that Glen Michael's TV programme was where he first discovered superheroes.

Millar's mother died of a heart attack at age 64, when Millar was 14, and his father died four years later, aged 65. Although Millar enjoyed drawing comics, he was not permitted to go to art school because his family frowned upon such endeavours as a waste of time for the academic Millar, who studied subjects like chemistry, physics and advanced maths. He initially planned to be a doctor, and subsequently decided that becoming an economist would be a viable alternate plan, but later decided that he "couldn't quite hack it" in that occupation. He attended Glasgow University to study politics and economics, but dropped out after his father's death left him without the money to pay his living expenses.

== Career ==
=== 1980s–1990s work ===
Millar was first inspired to become a comic book creator after meeting Alan Moore at a con in the mid-1980s. Years later, when an 18-year-old Millar interviewed Scottish comic book writer Grant Morrison for a fanzine, he told Morrison that he wanted to create comics as both a writer and an artist. Morrison, who then-recently returned to comics after spending most of the decade touring with their band The Mixers and had limited experience with both writing and drawing stories earlier in their career, suggested that Millar focus on one of those career paths, as it was very hard to be successful at both, which Millar cites as the best advice he has ever received. Soon after, Millar sold his first script, Saviour, to an independent Leicester-based publisher Trident. Illustrated by Daniel Vallely, Morrison's former bandmate in The Mixers and, earlier, The Fauves, Saviour provided a mix of religious themes, satire and superhero action that quickly brought Millar to the attention of the wider British comics industry and resulted in several script commissions for the long-running anthology 2000 AD and its sister title Crisis.

In 1992, Trident's owner Neptune Distribution went bankrupt, leaving both Saviour and The Shadowmen, Millar's second series at the publisher, unfinished. By that time, Millar already became a semi-regular contributor to 2000AD and its adjacent titles, and his output included several Robo-Hunter serials, a six-part prison story "Insiders" for Crisis, a Judge Dredd spin-off series Red Razors, as well as numerous newspaper strips starring Dredd himself for Daily Star. The following year, Millar, Morrison and writer John Smith were given editorial reins over 2000AD for an eight-week run titled "The Summer Offensive". The controversial initiative resulted, among other things, in the first major story co-written by Millar and Morrison, Big Dave.

In 1994, Millar crossed over to the American comic book industry, taking over the long-running series Swamp Thing, published under DC Comics' Vertigo imprint. The first four issues of his run were again co-written with Morrison, who, according to Millar, "came on board <...> to make sure that DC selected me above anyone else pitching for the gig". Although Millar's further work on Swamp Thing brought some critical acclaim to the ailing title, the book's sales were still low enough to warrant cancellation by the publisher. For the next few years, Millar continued to write sporadically for 2000AD and various American publishers, often co-scripting the stories with Morrison, with whom he shares the writing credit on the mini-series Skrull Kill Krew for Marvel, a short run on Vampirella for Harris, a year-long run on The Flash as well as Aztek: The Ultimate Man for DC.

Several of Millar's unrealized projects of this period include a revamp of Marvel's 2099 imprint and an "end-of-the-world" storyline for Marvel Tales, both co-created with Grant Morrison. In late 1998, Millar and Morrison, along with Mark Waid and Tom Peyer, developed an extensive proposal for the Superman titles that was scheduled to launch in January 2000. The proposal was greenlit, and the team's tenure as collaborative writers was scheduled to begin with upcoming editor Eddie Berganza's first issue. Upon returning from his vacation, then-current DC editor Mike Carlin was shocked to discover that big changes were being implemented to Superman without his knowledge and vetoed the project. In 1999, Millar also developed pitches for Phantom Stranger and Secret Society of Super-Villains as well as a revamp of his debut series Saviour.

In the late 1990s, Millar made the first attempt to branch out from comics into screenwriting with a vampire-themed black comedy-drama Sikeside. The script was eventually picked up by Channel 4 with Millar as both writer and director, and, although it was initially written as a TV movie, the production company asked Millar to develop it into a six-episode series instead. Described as "Buffy meets Trainspotting" and planned to be filmed in Millar's hometown of Coatbridge, Sikeside was ultimately cancelled during pre-production. In a 2010 interview, Millar mentioned that he has sold the rights to the script to producer Angus Lamont who wanted to turn it into a film for a theatrical release.

In 1999 and 2000, Millar wrote a newspaper column for The Evening Times.

=== Marvel and DC career ===
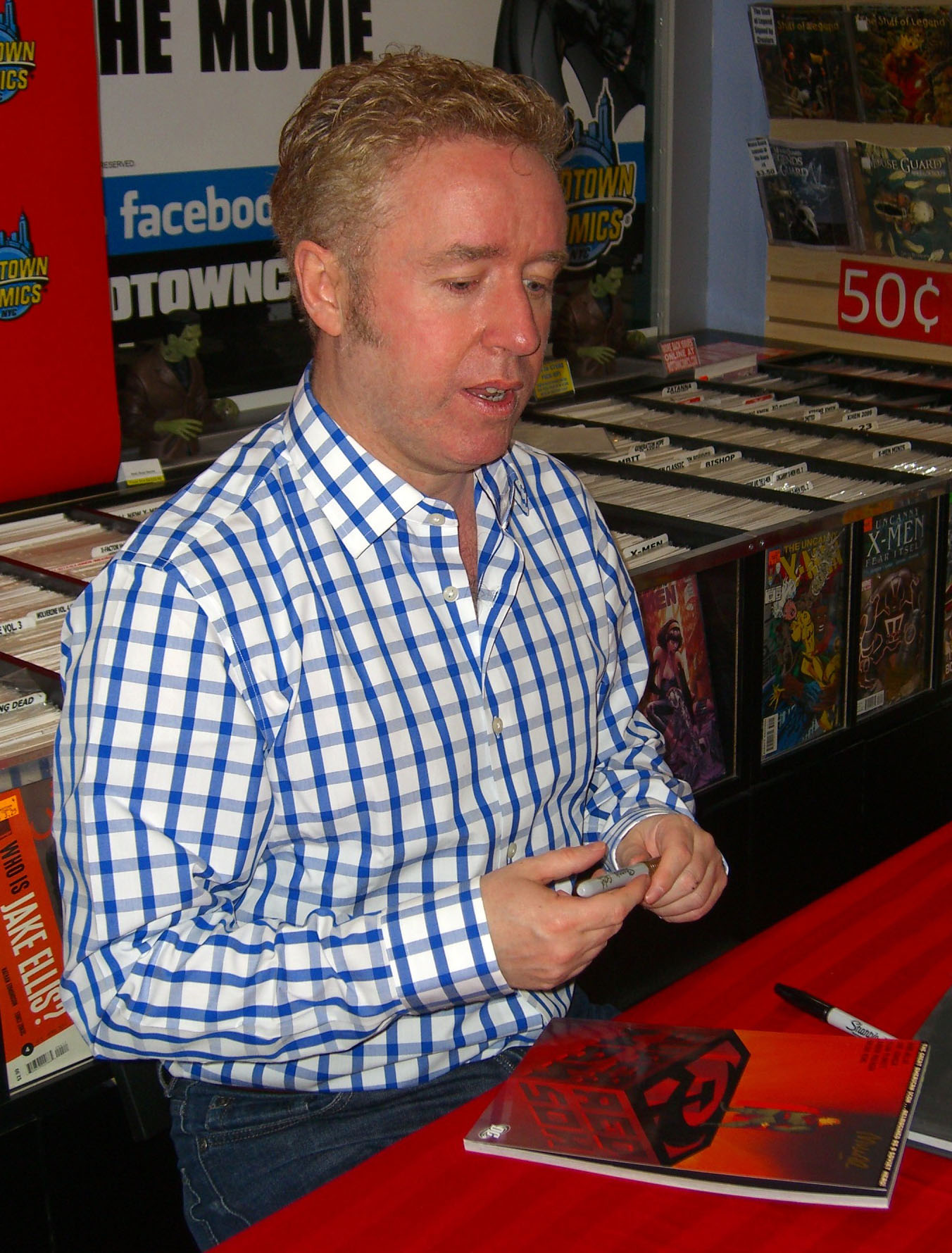
Millar signing a copy of Superman: Red Son at Midtown Comics in Manhattan

Millar started gaining notice at DC Comics for his work on the all-ages comic book series Superman Adventures, which featured stories set in the continuity of Superman: The Animated Series. Millar, a self-proclaimed Superman fan, stayed on the title for two years and received two Eisner Award nominations while penning one-off stories featuring the version of the character from the mainline DC Universe. Millar's best known Superman story, the three-issue Elseworlds mini-series Superman: Red Son, was first announced in 1998, even though Millar finished most of the script two years prior. As the series' original artist Dave Johnson fell behind the schedule, Millar opposed the idea of using other artists for the remaining pages. DC eventually brought in artist Kilian Plunkett to complete the book in 2002. Red Son, which Millar first came up with as a child after reading Superman #300, was published the following year and later adapted into an animated film of the same name.

In August 1999, it was announced that Millar and Scottish artist Frank Quitely will be taking over The Authority, an ongoing series published by DC Comics' Wildstorm imprint, on the recommendation of the outgoing writer and series' co-creator Warren Ellis. Millar's trademark style of over-the-top violence mixed with satire, pop culture references and mature themes was met with critical and commercial success while the book itself suffered from censorship enacted by DC starting with the new creative team's very first issue and continuing into Millar-written spin-off mini-series focusing on the team's former leader Jenny Sparks. As a result, the creators repeatedly requested a "Suggested for Mature Readers" label for the series but the idea was vetoed by then-Publisher of DC Comics Paul Levitz. Meanwhile, DC published a "lost" Superman Adventures script by Millar to capitalize on his newfound success, while Millar himself considered a move from his native Scotland to the United States, deliberating between staff position offers made by Wildstorm and DC Comics' main competitor Marvel.

In June 2000, Marvel announced that Millar will join its then-upcoming "Ultimate" line of comics as the writer on Ultimate X-Men, since Brian Michael Bendis, who was previously attached to the series, decided to focus his attention on the inaugural "Ultimate" launch of the Spider-Man title. The line, designed to simplify and streamline the company's long-running fictional continuity for mainstream audiences, was met with instant critical and commercial success and, soon after the launch of Ultimate X-Men, Millar announced that he had signed a two-year contract for a staff writing position at Marvel. As part of the deal, Millar and his family relocated to New York City.

In November 2000, Millar and Quitely announced their plans to leave The Authority after the third story arc, which was supposed to run in issues #22–25 (cover-dated March–June 2001) if the series was to maintain a monthly schedule. However, soon after the first issue of the arc was published, it was announced that Quitely had signed an exclusive contract with Marvel and would therefore leave the title earlier than planned. Wildstorm assigned Art Adams to finish the last issues and hired writer Tom Peyer and artist Dustin Nguyen to create another four-issue story arc that would fill the publishing gap while Adams worked on his portion of the series. Then, following the 11 September 2001 attacks, Wildstorm decided to postpone the release of the remaining three issues and further edit the completed but not yet released work for sensitive content, which eventually drove Adams away from the title. The Authority #29, Millar's last issue on the series, was published with art by Gary Erskine and the cover date of July 2002. Another Millar-written The Authority spin-off, a one-shot story tentatively titled Apollo/Midnighter, was announced for a 2000 release but never produced.

In 2002, Millar and artist Bryan Hitch further expanded Marvel's Ultimate line with The Ultimates, a reimagining of the company's Avengers team. The title also proved highly successful, although it suffered from delays in shipping due to Hitch's personal issues. The Ultimates was eventually cancelled after 13 issues and two years of publication with the aim of relaunching the title so that more issues could be produced in advance. The Ultimates 2 launched shortly thereafter and also suffered from delays, this time due to Millar's newly-diagnosed chronic condition and increased workload at Marvel. The second volume as well as the creative team's run on the title ended in 2007 with another 13th issue. Millar and Hitch's work on The Ultimates inspired two Marvel Animated Features titled Ultimate Avengers and the subsequent 2012 Marvel Studios feature film The Avengers, directed by Joss Whedon. Actor Aaron Taylor-Johnson, who portrayed the character Quicksilver in the 2015 sequel film Avengers: Age of Ultron, stated that it also drew inspiration from the Ultimate comics.

In 2002 and 2003, Millar wrote a column for Comic Book Resources. Around the same time, Millar's website included a teaser for a 6-issue Punisher series with artist Steve Dillon, although no official announcement was made by Marvel. In 2003, Millar and artist Terry Dodson launched Trouble at Marvel's newly-revived Epic imprint, a series meant to re-popularize romance comics that ended up both a sales and critical failure. That same year, Millar renewed his exclusive contract with Marvel for two more years. The following year, he penned two 12-issue runs for titles published under the Marvel Knights imprint, launching Marvel Knights Spider-Man again with Dodson and taking over the Wolverine ongoing series with artist John Romita, Jr. Millar and Ultimate Spider-Man writer Brian Michael Bendis launched a new ongoing series for the Ultimate Marvel imprint, Ultimate Fantastic Four but left it after just six issues due to scheduling problems. Millar and artist Greg Land were announced as the creative team for a new Thor ongoing series but the pair took over Ultimate Fantastic Four instead. Millar's return to the title introduced, among other things, the concept of Marvel Zombies. During this period, Millar was assigned to write a trilogy of mini-series that would introduce Galactus to the Ultimate Universe but he left the project due to other commitments at Marvel and health issues.

In 2006, after renewing his exclusive contract with Marvel for two more years, Millar launched the most well-known and best-selling work of his career, the 7-issue mini-series Civil War with artist Steve McNiven that acted as the centrepiece of the company-wide crossover storyline of the same name. The story revolved around the passing of the Superhuman Registration Act in response to the death and destruction unintentionally caused by superheroes on a regular basis and the resultant schism in the superheroic community, with Captain America and Iron Man taking opposing sides of the debacle. The storyline had lasting impact on the fictional Marvel Universe and served as the inspiration for the 2016 Marvel Studios film Captain America: Civil War.

In 2007 and 2008, Millar attempted to pitch a new series of Superman films to Warner Brothers but the studio went with David S. Goyer's pitch for Man of Steel instead. During that time, he also had two pitches rejected at Marvel, a Blade story with Richard Corben and a Ghost Rider story with John Romita, Jr., as both characters already had ongoing series at the time and Marvel did not believe either property could support more books. In 2008, Millar returned to the Wolverine ongoing series for an extended dystopian storyline "Old Man Logan", illustrated by his Civil War collaborator Steve McNiven. Elements of this story inspired the 2017 20th Century Fox film Logan. Also in 2008, Millar reteamed with The Ultimates co-creator Bryan Hitch for a run on the mainline Fantastic Four series and launched the mini-series Marvel 1985 with artist Tommy Lee Edwards. The three titles, running concurrently, are notable in that Millar purposefully wrote them as interlinked through the introduction of the character Clyde Wyncham, who also appeared in Millar's creator-owned series Kick-Ass that was published under Marvel's Icon imprint. In 2009, Millar returned to the Ultimate Universe with a number of limited series released under the Ultimate Comics: Avengers banner, his last Marvel work to date.

In 2011, Millar abandoned work-for-hire in favor of working full-time on his creator-owned properties.

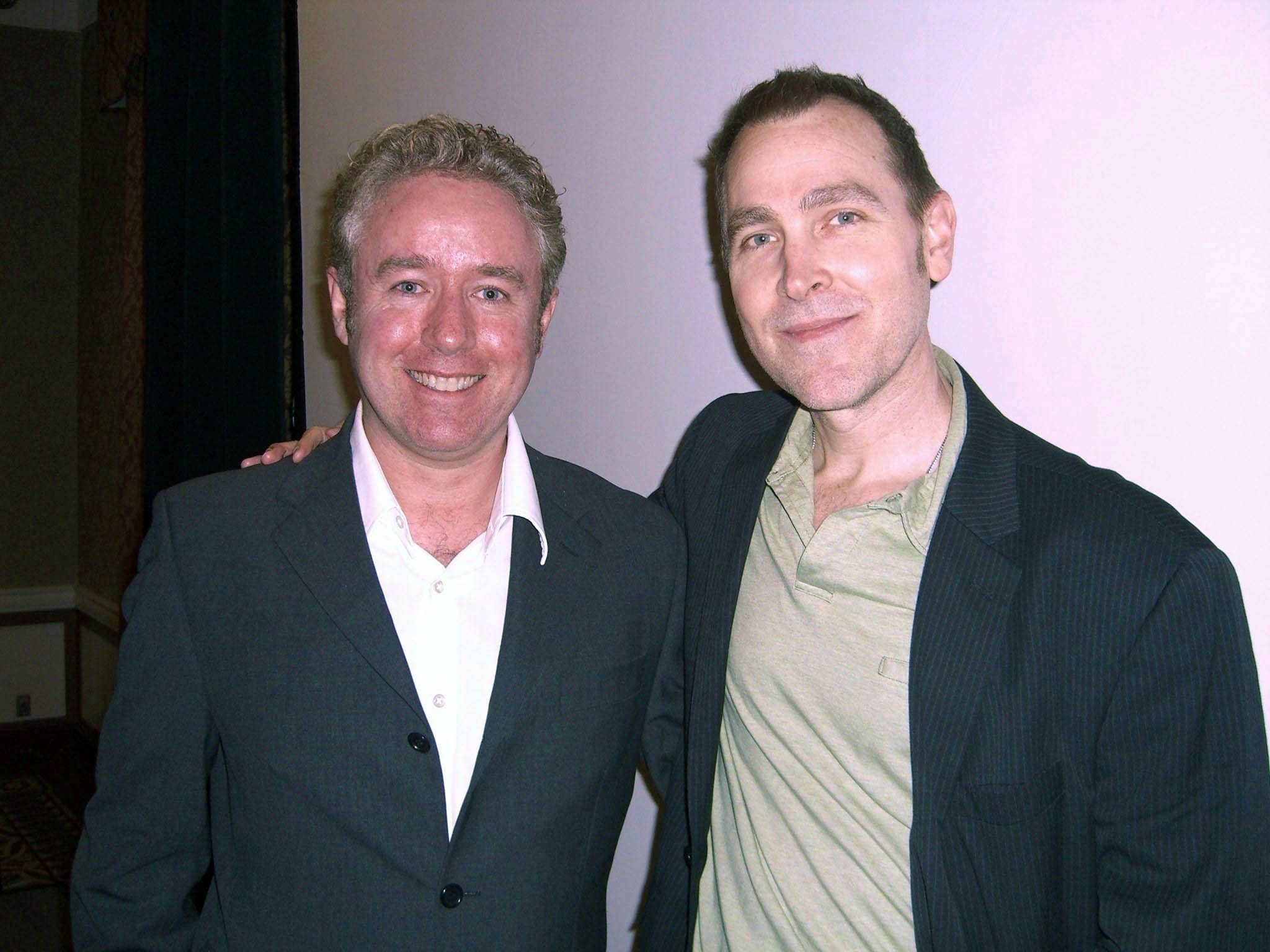
Millar and the Wanted co-creator, artist J. G. Jones at the Big Apple Convention, 2 October 2010

=== Millarworld ===
In 2003, Millar introduced Millarworld, a unified label for his future creator-owned comics, set in a shared fictional universe. The initial line-up consisted of Wanted (published by Top Cow and subsequently adapted into a Savage Dragon crossover by Erik Larsen, a feature film starring Angelina Jolie and Morgan Freeman, and a video game), Chosen (published by Dark Horse), The Unfunnies (published by Avatar) and the unreleased one-shot Run. Another unreleased project was King and Country, a political drama involving the British royal family repurposed from a TV series pitch Millar created in 2005. According to Millar, the book was supposed to be published in the form of a fully-painted graphic novel by a "big book publisher". In 2008, the Millarworld line expanded with two new releases, War Heroes at Image, and Kick-Ass, published under Marvel's Icon imprint and adapted into a feature film two years later. The ownership of the Millarworld series is split 50/50 between Millar and the collaborating artist.

In 2010, Millar and British publisher Titan launched a pop culture-themed magazine CLiNT that featured serializations of Millar's creator-owned comics as well as a number of short stories by up-and-coming creators submitted via the Millarworld forum. Other magazine contributors include Frankie Boyle, Stewart Lee, Jonathan Ross and Jimmy Carr. In 2011 and 2012, Millar organized the Kapow! Comic Convention in London. The 2011 Kapow! event was notable for setting two Guinness World Records, the "Fastest Production of a Comic Book" and "Most Contributors to a Comic Book". Millar began work at 9 am, plotting a 20-page Superior story, followed by more than 60 comic book creators—including Sean Phillips, Dave Gibbons, Frank Quitely, John Romita, Jr., Jock, Doug Braithwaite, Ian Churchill, Olivier Coipel, Duncan Fegredo, Simon Furman, David Lafuente, John McCrea, Liam Sharp—who appeared on stage throughout the day to create a panel each. The black-and-white book was completed in 11 hours, 19 minutes and 38 seconds, then published through Marvel's Icon imprint on 23 November 2011, with all royalties being donated to Yorkhill Children's Foundation. In 2015 and 2016, Millarworld held Talent Contest events where entrants had to write and/or draw short stories based on some of the company's properties. The winning entries were published as two anthology specials in 2016 and 2017, respectively.

Most of the Millarworld series have enjoyed interest from Hollywood over the years. In 2008, Michael De Luca optioned War Heroes for Columbia Pictures. In 2010, Nemesis was optioned by 20th Century Fox with Tony Scott attached to direct. Three years later, Fox optioned Starlight. 2014 saw the release of Kingsman: The Secret Service, directed by Matthew Vaughn. That same year, Superior was optioned by Fox with Vaughn attached as producer. The following year, Huck was picked up by Studio 8, while an adaptation of Chrononauts was announced to be in development by Universal. In 2016, Waypoint Entertainment optioned both Supercrooks and American Jesus (which had previously been optioned by Matthew Vaughn's Marv Films in 2009), while Lorenzo di Bonaventura began development on Jupiter's Legacy. That same year, Joe Roth and Jeff Kirschenbaum signed on to produce Empress with XXX: Return of Xander Cage writer F. Scott Frazier set to pen the screenplay.

In August 2017, it was announced that Millarworld has been purchased for an undisclosed sum by Netflix. Millar noted it was the third time in history a comic book company had been purchased by a production studio, comparing the buyout to the 1967 purchase of DC Comics by Kinney National Company (subsequently renamed to Warner Communications) and the 2009 acquisition of Marvel Comics by The Walt Disney Company. As part of the deal, Millar and his wife Lucy continued to run Millarworld as President and CEO, respectively, developing new properties to be produced by Netflix. Comics adapted to film before the deal, such as Kick-Ass and Kingsman, were not included in the package. The first of Millarworld properties to be adapted at Netflix was Jupiter's Legacy, which premiered in May 2021 with an eight-episode season. It was followed by the anime series Super Crooks in November 2021.

On May 27, 2025, it was announced that Millar would reunite with John Romita, Jr. for a new comic project entitled Psychic Sam. The premise follows Sam Nicoletti, a man who begins hearing a voice that tells him about murders the day before they happen. The comic, published under Side Hustle Comics (separate from the Millarworld imprint), launched as a Kickstarter campaign later that same day. It was announced that a film adaptation was in the works from producer Ivan Atkinson.

=== Public image ===
Over the years, Millar has earned a reputation as a controversial and outspoken writer. In interviews, he openly criticized the business practices of the American comics industry in the 90s, the comic book writing trend of decompression popularized in the early 00s, the tendency of Big Two publishers to oversaturate the market with tie-ins and spin-offs in the mid-00s as well as the DC Comics' management of The Authority during his tenure as the title's writer. In his writing, Millar has incorporated the themes of domestic abuse (The Ultimates), teenage pregnancy (Trouble), child molestation (The Unfunnies) and rape, the latter sometimes for comedic effect. In August 2013, when asked by Abraham Josephine Riesman of The New Republic about the use of rape as a plot device in more than one of his comics, Millar responded, "The ultimate [act] that would be the taboo, to show how bad some villain is, was to have somebody being raped, you know. I don't really think it matters. It's the same as, like, a decapitation. It's just a horrible act to show that somebody's a bad guy." The comment drew criticism from industry peers and comic book journalists. Similar incidents include Millar publicly expressing amazement at the fact that non-caucasians can get Down's syndrome and referring to all gamers as "pedos" in an interview.

Millar frequently employs unusual tactics to promote himself and his work, such as the public bet with Harry Knowles regarding the casting of the lead actor in then-upcoming Superman film in 2004, which Millar used as a way to advertise his run on Wolverine. That same year, Millar claimed that rapper Eminem was in talks to take the lead role of Wesley Gibson in the film adaptation of his creator-owned series Wanted, whose likeness Millar had the character illustrated with, which resulted in public denial by Eminem's management via Variety. In 2006, Millar auctioned the right to name the protagonist of his then-upcoming creator-owned series Kick-Ass. In 2016, he organized a "treasure hunt" for advance copies of Jupiter's Legacy hidden in ten cities around the world. In 2017, Millar established a charitable foundation and launched a multi-year campaign to promote it.

Throughout the 90s and early 00s, Millar was close friends with fellow Scottish writer Grant Morrison. The pair frequently collaborated on works published by British and American publishers and appeared together at various events. Morrison was seen as the mentor figure in their relationship, as evidenced by a humorous strip created by Garth Ennis and Dave Gibbons for an anniversary issue of 2000 AD in which Millar appeared in the form of a small droid repeating a single phrase, "me and Gwant". The pair was also parodied in an issue of Simpsons Comics written by Gail Simone, shown fighting over whose then-ongoing X-Men series—Millar's Ultimate or Morrison's New—is more important. Sometime around 2004, Millar and Morrison seemingly cut all communication and never interacted in public again, which, according to Morrison, happened because Millar wanted to break away from the image of Morrison's protégé after the success he had with The Authority and Ultimate X-Men. When asked about the state of their relationship in a 2011 interview, Morrison responded thus, "I wish him well but, no, there is no good feeling between myself and Mark Millar for many reasons most of which are he destroyed my faith in human fucking nature."

=== Awards and accolades ===
In August 2011, Millar appeared in his native Coatbridge to unveil a superhero-themed steel archway beside the Monkland Canal, created by sculptor Andy Scott with the help from the students at St. Ambrose High School, Millar's alma mater. The six-metre-high archway, created as part of the efforts to reinvigorate the canal, was inspired by Millar's work, depicting a superhero named Captain Coatbridge and two superheroines.

In June 2013, Millar was appointed a Member of the Most Excellent Order of the British Empire (MBE) for services to film and literature on the Queen's Honours Birthday list.

=== Award nominations ===
- 2000 Eisner Award for Best Title for a Younger Audience — Superman Adventures (shared with Aluir Amâncio, Terry Austin, and others)
- 2000 Eisner Award for Best Writer — Superman Adventures
- 2001 Eisner Award for Best Writer — The Authority and Ultimate X-Men
- 2001 Eisner Award for Best Serialized Story — The Authority #13–16: "The Nativity" (shared with Frank Quitely and Trevor Scott)
- 2004 Eagle Award for Favourite Comics Writer
- 2005 Eagle Award for Favourite Comics Writer

=== Award wins ===
- 2007 Harvey Award for Best Single Issue or Story for Marvel's Civil War #1 with Steve McNiven

== Influences ==
Millar has cited Alan Moore and Frank Miller as the two biggest influences on his career, characterising them as "my Mum and Dad." Other comic book creators he names as influences include Dave Sim, Grant Morrison, Peter Milligan, Warren Ellis, and Garth Ennis.

In 2013, Millar listed Superman, Flash Gordon, The Spy Who Loved Me, Star Wars, and The Incredibles as his five favorite films.

== Personal life ==
Millar is a practicing Catholic who abstains from using profanity in his personal life. He met his first girlfriend Gill, who lived nearby in Coatbridge and attended the same school as him, at the age of 17. The couple married in 1993 and divorced in early 2009. They had one daughter, Emily, who was born in 1998. Millar's second wife, Lucy Unwin, gave birth to their first child in November 2011, and the second in March 2014. Millar and Unwin married in May 2016. As of 2010, they resided in Glasgow's West End.

In 2005, Millar was diagnosed with Crohn's disease.

=== Political views ===
Speaking about his political views, Millar has described himself thus, "I regard myself as traditionally left of centre and progressive, a Eurosceptic in the Bennite mould, and the policies espoused by the coalition formed under the Yes umbrella are the closest to my own particular ideology." He was formerly a member and "lifetime" supporter of the Labour Party, resigning from the party membership and withdrawing his support in 2025, describing the Starmer government as "nightmarish, totalitarian rabble" that had been more damaging for Britain "than Margaret Thatcher and the Luftwaffe put together."

Before the 2014 Scottish independence referendum, Millar was cited as a supporter of Scottish independence by groups such as the National Collective, and made comments interpreted in support of independence. However, in the run-up to the referendum, Millar stated that he was "genuinely undecided". In a January 2015 interview with The Herald, he stated, "Originally I was Yes and then about six months before I started having doubts, and then I just went silent on it because I saw the country going mad. People who I love were falling out with each other." In 2020, Millar explained on Twitter that he is not a "tribalist" when it comes to Scottish independence, stating, "After the Blair era I was tempted for a year or two" regarding the matter, but questioned whether an independent Scotland could function economically.

Millar supported British withdrawal from the European Union and endorsed a Leave vote during the 2016 United Kingdom European Union membership referendum, stating that it would be a path towards Scottish independence.

== Bibliography ==
=== UK publishers ===
==== Trident ====
- Saviour #1–6 (with Daniel Vallely and Nigel Kitching, 1989–1990)
  - Issues #1–5 are collected as Saviour Book One (tpb, 128 pages, 1990, ISBN 1-872829-01-5)
  - A "Saviour" short story (drawn by Nigel Kitching) has also appeared in Trident #5 (anthology, 1990)
- The Shadowmen #1–2 (with Andrew Hope and Ben Dilworth (#2), 1990)

==== Fleetway ====
- Crisis (anthology):
  - "Her Parents" (with John McCrea, in #31, 1989)
  - "Insiders" (with Paul Grist, in #54–59, 1991)
- 2000 AD (anthology):
  - Tharg's Future Shocks:
    - All-Star Future Shocks (tpb, 192 pages, Simon & Schuster, 2013, ISBN 1-78108-074-7) includes:
      - "The Foreign Model" (with Dave D'Antiquis, in #643, 1989)
      - "Self Awareness" (with Keith Page, in #648, 1989)
    - "Nightmare on Ses*me Street " (with Brian Williamson, in #785, 1992)
    - "A Fete Worse Than Death" (with Brian Williamson, in #786, 1992)
    - "The Night Santa Signed On" (with Ron Smith, in #868, 1994)
  - Silo (with Dave D'Antiquis, in #706–711, 1990) collected in Tharg's Creepy Chronicles (tpb, 144 pages, Simon & Schuster, 2012, ISBN 1-78108-065-8)
  - Zenith: "Tales of the Alternative Earth" (prose story, in Winter Special '90, 1990) collected in Zenith Phase Four (hc, 112 pages, Rebellion, 2015, ISBN 1-78108-346-0)
  - Judge Dredd:
    - "Christmas is Cancelled" (with Brett Ewins, in Winter Special '90, 1990) collected in Judge Dredd: The Restricted Files Volume 3 (tpb, 288 pages, Rebellion, 2011, ISBN 1-907992-21-9)
    - "Happy Birthday Judge Dredd!" (with Carl Critchlow, in #829, 1993) collected in Judge Dredd: The Complete Case Files Volume 18 (tpb, 304 pages, Rebellion, 2011, ISBN 1-907992-25-1)
    - Judge Dredd: The Complete Case Files Volume 19 (tpb, 320 pages, Rebellion, 2012, ISBN 1-907992-96-0) includes:
      - "Great Brain Robbery" (with Ron Smith, in #835–836, 1993)
      - "Tough Justice" (with Mick Austin, in #840, 1993)
      - "Down Among the Dead Men" (with Brett Ewins, in #841, 1993)
      - "War Games" (with Paul Marshall, in #854, 1993)
      - "Judge Tyrannosaur" (with Ron Smith, in #855, 1993)
    - Judge Dredd: The Complete Case Files Volume 20 (tpb, 320 pages, Rebellion, 2013, ISBN 1-78108-141-7) includes:
      - "Book of the Dead" (co-written by Millar and Grant Morrison, art by Dermot Power, in #859–866, 1993)
      - "I Hate Christmas" (with Carlos Ezquerra, in #867, 1993)
      - "Frankenstein Division" (with Carlos Ezquerra, in #868–871, 1994)
      - "Crime Prevention" (with Nick Percival, in #872, 1994)
      - "Top Gun" (with Ron Smith, in #879, 1994)
      - "Under Siege" (with Paul Peart, in #880, 1994)
    - "Mr. Bennet Joins the Judges" (with Peter Doherty, in Sci-Fi Special '94, 1994) collected in Judge Dredd: The Restricted Files Volume 4 (tpb, 272 pages, Rebellion, 2012, ISBN 1-78108-046-1)
    - "Crusade" (co-written by Millar and Grant Morrison and Mick Austin, in #928–937, 1995) collected in Judge Dredd: The Complete Case Files Volume 22 (tpb, 304 pages, Rebellion, 2014, ISBN 1-78108-227-8)
    - "Man Who Broke the Law" (with Steve Yeowell, in #968–969, 1995) collected in Judge Dredd: The Complete Case Files Volume 24 (tpb, 320 pages, Rebellion, 2015, ISBN 1-78108-339-8)
    - "The Big Hit" (with Graham Stoddart, in #1029–1030, 1997) collected in Judge Dredd: The Complete Case Files Volume 26 (tpb, 320 pages, Rebellion, 2016, ISBN 1-78108-431-9)
  - Robo-Hunter:
    - "Sam Slade: Robo-Hunter" (with Jose Casanovas, in #723–734, 1991)
    - "Return of the Puppet Master" (with Simon Jacob, in Sci-Fi Special '91, 1991)
    - "Killer Grannies" (with Graham Higgins, in Yearbook '92, 1991)
    - "Escape from Bisleyland" (with Anthony Williams, in #750–759, 1991)
    - "The Return to Verdus" (with Jose Casanovas, in #792–802, 1992)
    - "Aces of Slades" (with Anthony Williams, in #813–816, 1992–1993)
    - "The Succubus" (with Simon Jacob, in Yearbook '93, 1992)
    - "Serial Stunners" (with Jose Casanovas, in #819–822, 1993)
    - "Keith the Killer Robot" (with Ron Smith, in #825–827, 1993)
    - "The Robotic Revenge of Dr. Robotski" (with Simon Jacob, in #881–884, 1994)
  - Red Razors:
    - Red Razors (tpb, 144 pages, DC Comics, 2004, ISBN 1-904265-18-9) collects:
      - Judge Dredd Megazine #8–15: "Red Razors" (with Steve Yeowell, 1991)
      - "The Hunt for Red Razors" (with Nigel Dobbyn, in #908–917, 1994)
    - "The Secret Origin of Comrade Ed" (with Steve Yeowell, in Judge Dredd Mega-Special #5, 1992)
    - "Doctor's Orders" (with Steve Yeowell, in Judge Dredd Yearbook '93, 1992)
    - "Rites of Passage" (with Nigel Dobbyn, in #971, 1995)
  - Judge Anderson: "The Most Dangerous Game" (with Dermot Power, in Judge Dredd Yearbook '92, 1991) collected in Judge Anderson: The Psi Files Volume 4 (tpb, 304 pages, Rebellion, 2014, ISBN 1-78108-236-7)
  - Tales from Beyond Science (with Rian Hughes, in #774, 776, Winter Special '92, Sci-Fi Special '94, 1992–1994) collected in Tales from Beyond Science (hc, 88 pages, Image, 2013, ISBN 1-60706-471-5)
  - Rogue Trooper: "House of Pain" (with Brett Ewins and Jim McCarthy, in Sci-Fi Special '92, 1992) collected in Rogue Trooper: Tales of Nu-Earth Volume 4 (tpb, 288 pages, 2014, ISBN 1-78108-230-8)
  - The Spider: "Vicious Games" (with John Higgins, in Action Special, 1992)
  - Purgatory (with Carlos Ezquerra, in #834–841, 1993)
  - Tharg's Terror Tales:
    - The Best of Tharg's Terror Tales (tpb, 112 pages, Rebellion, 2023, ISBN 1-83786-019-X) includes:
      - "The Tooth Fairy" (with Greg Staples, in #839, 1993)
      - "The Uncanny Dr. Doctor" (with Shaky Kane, in #860, 1993)
      - "Milk and Honey" (with Kevin Cullen, in #895, 1994)
  - Maniac 5:
    - "Maniac 5" (with Steve Yeowell, in #842–849, 1993)
    - "War Journal" (with David Hine, in Sci-Fi Special '93, 1993)
    - "Maniac 6 (prelude)" (with Richard Elson, in Winter Special '93, 1993)
    - "Funeral for a Friend" (with Robert McCallum, in Winter Special '94, 1994)
    - "Maniac 6" (with Steve Yeowell, in #956–963, 1995)
  - Big Dave (co-written by Millar and Grant Morrison):
    - "Target: Baghdad" (with Steve Parkhouse, in #842–845, 1993)
    - "Monarchy in the UK" (with Steve Parkhouse, in #846–849, 1993)
    - "Young Dave" (with Steve Parkhouse, in Yearbook '94, 1993)
    - "Costa del Chaos" (with Anthony Williams, in #869–872, 1994)
    - "Wotta Lotta Balls" (with Steve Parkhouse, in #904–907, 1994)
  - Canon Fodder (with Chris Weston, in #861–867, 1993)
  - The Grudge-Father (with Jim McCarthy, in #878–883, 1994)
  - Babe Race 2000 (with Anthony Williams, in #883–888 and Yearbook '95, 1994–1995)
  - Rogue Trooper (Friday): "G.I. Blues" (with Chris Weston, in #901–903, 1994)
  - Janus: Psi-Division (with Paul Johnson):
    - "A New Star" (in #980–984, 1996)
    - "Faustus" (co-written by Millar and Grant Morrison, in #1024–1031, 1997)
- Revolver: The Horror Special: "Mother's Day" (with Phil Winslade, co-feature, 1990)
- The Comic Relief Comic (among other writers and artists, one-shot, 1991)
- Sonic the Comic (anthology):
  - Sonic the Hedgehog:
    - "Robofox" (with Woodrow Phoenix, in #2, 1993)
    - "Mayhem in the Marble Hill Zone" (with Jose Casanovas, in #3, 1993)
    - "Lost in the Labyrinth Zone" (with Woodrow Phoenix, in #5, 1993)
    - "Time Racer" (with Ed Hillyer, in #11, 1993)
    - "Hidden Danger!" (with Carl Flint, in #12, 1993)
    - "Double Trouble" (with Mike Hadley, in #13, 1993)
    - "The Green Eater" (with Mike Hadley, in #15, 1993)
    - "Happy Christmas Doctor Robotnik!" (with Brian Williamson, in #16, 1993)
    - "A Day in the Life of Doctor Robotnik" (with Mike Hadley, in #42, 1994)
    - "Odour Zone" (with Mike Hadley, in #72, 1996)
    - "Spinball Wizard" (with Keith Page, in #73, 1996)
  - Streets of Rage (with Peter Richardson, in #7–12 and 25–30, 1993–1994)

==== Other ====
- Daily Star (daily newspaper strip featuring Judge Dredd, published by Reach plc):
  - "Return of the Peeper" (with Mike Collins, episodes #1556–1598, published from 2 March to 20 April 1991)
  - "How to be a... Monster" (with Mike Collins, episodes #1599–1640, published from 22 April to 8 June 1991)
  - "Assault on Sector House 13" (with Carlos Pino, episodes #1641–1682, published from 10 June to 27 July 1991)
  - "Reform School Reunion" (with Carlos Pino, episodes #1725–1766, published from 16 September to 2 November 1991)
  - "Blood of Nosferatu" (with Carlos Pino, episodes #1767–1808, published from 4 November to 21 December 1991)
  - "Death to the Judges" (with Carlos Pino, episodes #1851–1892, published from 12 February to 31 March 1992)
  - "Vic Slaughter's Big Night Out" (with Carlos Pino, episodes #1935–1976, published from 20 May to 7 July 1992)
  - "Hondo City Nightmare" (with Carlos Pino, episodes #1977–2018, published from 8 July to 24 August 1992)
  - "Night of the Living Dredd" (with Carlos Pino, episodes #2061–2102, published from 13 October to 1 December 1992)
  - "Brute Force" (with Carlos Pino, episodes #2103–2144, published from 2 December 1992 to 20 January 1993)
  - "Mega-City Heat" (with Carlos Pino, episodes #2145–2186, published from 21 January to 10 March 1993)
  - "The Poverty Trap" (with Carlos Pino, episodes #2229–2270, published from 29 April to 16 June 1993)
  - "The Underworld Rises!" (with Carlos Pino, episodes #2271–2312, published from 17 June to 4 August 1993)
  - "Night of the Futant" (with Carlos Pino, episodes #2355–2396, published from 23 September to 10 November 1993)
  - "Corpulence, Inc." (with Carlos Pino, episodes #2397–2438, published from 11 November to 31 December 1993)
  - "Pritzy's Honour" (with Carlos Pino, episodes #2439–2480, published from 1 January to 18 February 1994)
  - "Breakout" (with Carlos Pino, episodes #2481–2522, published from 19 February to 8 April 1994)
  - "The Big Hit" (with Carlos Pino, episodes #2565–2606, published from 28 May to 15 July 1994)
  - "Perp Watch" (with Carlos Pino, episodes #2649–2690, published from 3 September to 21 October 1994)
  - "Wanted: Judge Dredd" (with Carlos Pino, episodes #2691–2732, published from 22 October to 9 December 1994)
  - "Marked for Death" (with Carlos Pino, episodes #2775–2816, published from 30 January to 18 March 1995)
  - "Mean as Sin" (with Carlos Pino, episodes #2817–2858, published from 30 March to 6 May 1995)
  - "Nutty City One" (with Ron Smith, episodes #2859–2894, published from 8 May to 24 June 1995)
  - "The Dead Judge's Society" (with Carlos Pino, episodes #2895–2936, published from 26 June to 12 August 1995)
  - "Muggable Willy" (with Carlos Pino, episodes #2937–2978, published from 14 August to 30 September 1995)
  - "Dead Man's Boots" (with Ron Smith, episodes #2979–2990, published from 2 October to 18 November 1995)
  - "Block Law" (with Carlos Pino, episodes #3021–3061, published from 20 November 1995 to 11 January 1996)
  - "Spirit of Vengeance" (with Ron Smith, episodes #3062–3102, published from 12 January to 27 March 1996)
  - "Teutronic Knights" (with Carlos Pino, episodes #3103–3144, published from 28 March to 16 April 1996)
  - "The Long Walk" (with Carlos Pino, episodes #3145–3186, published from 17 April to 4 June 1996)
  - "Euroball 2118!" (with Ron Smith, episodes #3187–3228, published from 5 June to 23 July 1996)
  - "Slugheads!" (with Ron Smith, episodes #3229–3270, published from 24 July to 10 September 1996)
  - "Jimpy" (with Carlos Pino, episodes #3271–3312, published from 11 September to 29 October 1996)
  - "Strangers on a Zoom Train" (with Ron Smith, episodes #3313–3354, published from 30 October to 17 December 1996)
- CLiNT (as Editor-in-Chief, magazine featuring TV and film-related articles and interviews as well as comic strips and serials, Titan):
  - CLiNT #1–15 (featuring serializations of Kick-Ass 2 (#1–15), Nemesis (#1–5), American Jesus (#2–7) and Superior (#6–15), 2010–2012)
    - Original stories featured in the magazine:
      - Space Oddities (self-contained strips by various creators):
        - "The Diner" (written and drawn by Manuel Bracchi, in #1)
        - "Emergency Pit-Stop" (written and drawn by Mateus Santolouco, in #2)
        - "Fall of the Fortress" (written and drawn by Bruno Letizia, in #3)
        - "Best Man" (written by Muriel Gray, drawn by Des Taylor, in #4)
        - "Someone Got to Eddie" (written by Ian Rankin, drawn by Stephen Daly, in #5)
        - "The Battle of Dansroom" (written by Ryan Schrodt, drawn by Des Taylor, in #6)
        - "Treasure" (written and drawn by Stephen Baskerville, in #7)
      - Rex Royd (co-written by Frankie Boyle and Jim Muir, drawn by Mike Dowling, in #1–4, 12–13 and Mark Millar's CLiNT #1)
      - The Property (written by Stewart Lee, drawn by Steve Yeowell, in #4)
      - Beat My Score (written by Jimmy Carr, drawn by Ryusuke Hamamoto, in #9)
    - Reprints of previously published stories serialized in the magazine:
      - Turf (written by Jonathan Ross, drawn by Tommy Lee Edwards, in #1–10)
      - The Pro (written by Garth Ennis, drawn by Amanda Conner, in #5–9)
      - Who is Jake Ellis? (written by Nathan Edmondson, drawn by Tonči Zonjić, in #8–12)
      - Officer Downe (written by Joe Casey, drawn by Chris Burnham, in #10–11)
      - Graveyard of Empires (written by Mark Sable, drawn by Paul Azaceta, in #12–15 and Mark Millar's CLiNT #3–4)
  - Mark Millar's CLiNT #1–8 (featuring serializations of Supercrooks (#1–5), The Secret Service (#1–7) and Hit-Girl (#2–7), 2012–2013)
    - Original stories featured in the magazine:
      - Death Sentence (written by Monty Nero, drawn by Mike Dowling, in #1–8)
      - Homesick (written by J. P. Rutter, drawn by Martin Stiff, in #7)
      - Odyssey (written by Dave Elliott, drawn by Garrie Gastonny, in #8)
- Side Hustle Comics (label used by Millar for self-publishing comics funded via Kickstarter):
  - Psychic Sam Volume 1 (with John Romita, Jr., graphic novel, 80 pages, 2025, ISBN 1-919210-01-6)
  - Conquered Volume 1 (with Valerio Giangiordano, graphic novel, 76 pages, 2026, ISBN 1-919210-04-0)

=== DC Comics ===
- Swamp Thing vol. 2 (with Phil Hester, Chris Weston (#153), Phil Jimenez (#156), Jill Thompson (#159); issues #140–143 are co-written by Millar and Grant Morrison, Vertigo, 1994–1996) collected as:
  - The Root of All Evil (collects #140–150, tpb, 296 pages, 2015, ISBN 1-4012-5241-9)
  - Darker Genesis (collects #151–160, tpb, 256 pages, 2015, ISBN 1-4012-5828-X)
  - Trial by Fire (collects #161–171, tpb, 272 pages, 2016, ISBN 1-4012-6337-2)
  - Swamp Thing by Mark Millar and Phil Hester Omnibus (collects #140–171, hc, 896 pages, DC Black Label, 2025, ISBN 1-7795-2807-8)
- Batman: Legends of the Dark Knight #79: "Favorite Things" (with Steve Yeowell, anthology, 1996) collected in Batman: The Greatest Stories Ever Told Volume 1 (tpb, 192 pages, 2005, ISBN 1-4012-0444-9)
- Aztek, the Ultimate Man #1–10 (co-written by Millar and Grant Morrison, art by N. Steven Harris, 1996–1997) collected as Aztek, the Ultimate Man (tpb, 240 pages, 2008, ISBN 1-4012-1688-9)
- Justice League:
  - JLA Secret Files & Origins:
    - JLA: The Deluxe Edition Volume 1 (tpb, 256 pages, 2011, ISBN 1-4012-3314-7) includes:
      - "Secret Origin: Star-Seed" (co-written by Millar and Grant Morrison, art by Howard Porter, in #1, 1997)
      - "Lost Pages: The New Superman Meets the JLA" (with Don Hillsman, co-feature in #1, 1997)
      - "A Day in the Life: Martian Manhunter" (with Don Hillsman, co-feature in #1, 1997)
    - "Secrets of the JLA Trophy Room" (with Chris Jones, co-feature in #2, 1998)
  - JLA: Paradise Lost #1–3 (with Ariel Olivetti, 1998)
  - JLA 80-Page Giant #1: "The Secret Society of Super-Villains" (with Chris Jones, anthology, 1998)
  - JLA #27: "The Bigger They Come..." (with Mark Pajarillo, 1999) collected in JLA: The Deluxe Edition Volume 3 (tpb, 344 pages, 2013, ISBN 1-4012-3832-7)
- The Flash vol. 2 (co-written by Millar and Grant Morrison, art by Paul Ryan, Ron Wagner (#137–138) and Pop Mhan (#139–141), 1997–1998) collected as:
  - Emergency Stop (collects #130–135, tpb, 144 pages, 2009, ISBN 1-4012-2177-7)
  - The Human Race (collects #136–141, tpb, 160 pages, 2009, ISBN 1-4012-2239-0)
  - The Flash by Grant Morrison and Mark Millar (collects #130–141, tpb, 334 pages, 2016, ISBN 1-4012-6102-7; hc, 416 pages, 2025, ISBN 1-7995-0042-X)
    - Includes the "Your Life is My Business" short story (art by Ariel Olivetti) from The Flash 80-Page Giant #1 (anthology, 1998)
- Superman:
  - Superman Adventures (with Aluir Amâncio, Mike Manley (#25, 28, 34) and Neil Vokes (#33), 1998–2000) collected as:
    - Up, Up and Away! (collects #16, 19, 22–24, digest-sized tpb, 112 pages, 2004, ISBN 1-4012-0331-0)
    - The Never-Ending Battle (collects #25–29, digest-sized tpb, 112 pages, 2004, ISBN 1-4012-0332-9)
    - Last Son of Krypton (collects #30–31, 33–34, digest-sized tpb, 112 pages, 2006, ISBN 1-4012-1037-6)
    - The Man of Steel (collects #35–38, digest-sized tpb, 112 pages, 2006, ISBN 1-4012-1038-4)
    - Superman Adventures (includes 15 of the 22 one-page stories from #41, digest-sized tpb, 128 pages, 2013, ISBN 1-4012-4706-7)
    - Superman by Mark Millar (includes #52, tpb, 280 pages, 2018, ISBN 1-4012-7874-4)
      - Also collects the Tangent Comics: The Superman one-shot (art by Butch Guice, 1998)
      - Also collects the Team Superman one-shot (art by Georges Jeanty, 1999)
      - Also collects the "From Krypton with Love" short story (art by Sean Phillips) from Superman 80-Page Giant #2 (anthology, 1999)
  - Action Comics #753–755, 758 (co-written by Millar and Stuart Immonen, art by Immonen and Shawn Martinbrough (#755), 1999)
  - Superman: Secret Files & Origins #2: "Big Belly Burgers" (with Shannon Denton, co-feature, 1999)
  - Adventures of Superman (co-written by Millar and Stuart Immonen):
    - Superman: The City of Tomorrow Volume 1 (tpb, 466 pages, 2019, ISBN 1-4012-9508-8) includes:
      - "Higher Ground" (art by Steve Epting, in #573, 1999)
      - "Something Borrowed, Something Blue" (art by Joe Phillips, in #574, 2000)
      - "A Night at the Opera" (art by Yanick Paquette, in #575, 2000)
      - "AnarchY2Knowledge" (art by Stuart Immonen, in #576, 2000)
  - Superman: For the Animals: "Dear Superman..." (with Tom Grummett, free one-shot polybagged with DC Comics publications with a March 2000 cover date, 2000)
  - Superman: Red Son #1–3 (with Dave Johnson and Kilian Plunkett, 2003) collected as Superman: Red Son (tpb, 160 pages, 2004, ISBN 1-4012-0191-1; hc, 2009, ISBN 1-4012-2425-3)
- DC One Million 80-Page Giant: "System's Finest" (with Mike Wieringo, anthology one-shot, 1999) collected in DC One Million Omnibus (hc, 1,080 pages, 2013, ISBN 1-4012-4243-X)
- DCU Heroes: Secret Files & Origins: "Lost Pages: Above Top Secret" (with Matthew Clark, co-feature in one-shot, 1999)
- The Books of Magic vol. 2 Annual #3: "The New Mystic Youth: Who is Tim Hunter?" (with Phil Jimenez, co-feature, Vertigo, 1999) collected in The Books of Magic Omnibus Volume 2 (hc, 1,488 pages, 2022, ISBN 1-77951-320-8)
- Day of Judgment Secret Files & Origins: "Which Witch?" (with Yanick Paquette) and "One Enchanted Evening..." (with Phil Winslade, co-features, 1999) collected in Day of Judgment (tpb, 160 pages, 2013, ISBN 1-4012-3795-9)
- Silver Age: Justice League of America: "The League without Justice!" (with Scott Kolins, one-shot, 2000)
- Wonder Woman vol. 2 #153: "Mad About the Boy" (with Georges Jeanty, 2000)
- The Authority Omnibus (hc, 984 pages, 2019, ISBN 1-4012-9231-3) includes:
  - The Authority #13–20, 22, 27–29 (with Frank Quitely, Chris Weston (#17–18), Art Adams (#27–28) and Gary Erskine (#29), Wildstorm, 2000–2002)
    - In a 2003 interview, Grant Morrison stated they ghost-wrote issue #28, with Millar later adjusting the script to make the issue fit his storyline.
    - Millar's run along with the fill-in issues was also collected as The Authority Volume 2 (hc, 416 pages, 2013, ISBN 1-4012-4275-8; tpb, 2014, ISBN 1-4012-5080-7)
    - Script and art in issues #13–14 and 27–28 were censored; the restored, uncensored pages were first printed in The Authority: Absolute Edition Volume 2 (hc, 504 pages, 2018, ISBN 1-4012-8115-X)
  - Jenny Sparks: The Secret History of the Authority #1–5 (with John McCrea, Wildstorm, 2000–2001) also collected as Jenny Sparks: The Secret History of the Authority (tpb, 128 pages, 2001, ISBN 1-56389-769-5)
- Tales of the New Gods: "Infinetly Gentle Infinetly Suffering" (previously unpublished short story with art by Steve Ditko; tpb, 168 pages, 2008, ISBN 1-4012-1637-4)

=== Marvel Comics ===
- Skrull Kill Krew #1–5 (co-written by Millar and Grant Morrison, art by Steve Yeowell, 1995) collected as Skrull Kill Krew (tpb, 128 pages, 2006, ISBN 0-7851-2120-X)
- Marvels Comics Group: Codename X-Men: "How I Learned to Love the Bomb" (with Sean Phillips, one-shot, 2000)
- 411 #1: "Tit-for-Tat" (with Frank Quitely, anthology, 2003)
- Trouble #1–5 (with Terry Dodson, Epic, 2003) collected as Trouble (hc, 120 pages, 2011, ISBN 0-7851-5086-2)
- Marvel Knights Spider-Man #1–12 (with Terry Dodson and Frank Cho (#5 and 8), Marvel Knights, 2004–2005) collected as Marvel Knights Spider-Man (hc, 304 pages, 2005, ISBN 0-7851-1842-X; tpb, 2011, ISBN 0-7851-5640-2)
- Wolverine vol. 3 (with John Romita, Jr. and Kaare Andrews (#32), Marvel Knights, 2004–2005; with Steve McNiven, 2008–2009) collected as:
  - Enemy of the State: The Complete Edition (collects #20–32, hc, 352 pages, 2006, ISBN 0-7851-2206-0; tpb, 2008, ISBN 0-7851-3301-1)
  - Old Man Logan (collects #66–72 and the Giant-Size Wolverine: Old Man Logan one-shot special, hc, 224 pages, 2009, ISBN 0-7851-3159-0; tpb, 2010, ISBN 0-7851-3172-8)
  - Wolverine by Mark Millar Omnibus (collects #20–32, 66–72 and the Giant-Size Wolverine: Old Man Logan one-shot special, hc, 576 pages, 2013, ISBN 0-7851-6796-X)
- Wha… Huh? (with Jim Mahfood, among other writers, one-shot, 2005) collected in Secret Wars Too (tpb, 208 pages, 2016, ISBN 1-302-90211-3)
- Civil War #1–7 (with Steve McNiven, 2006–2007) collected as Civil War (tpb, 208 pages, 2007, ISBN 0-7851-2179-X; hc, 512 pages, 2008, ISBN 0-7851-2178-1)
- Fantastic Four by Mark Millar and Bryan Hitch Omnibus (hc, 784 pages, 2023, ISBN 1-30294-971-3) includes:
  - Fantastic Four (with Bryan Hitch, Neil Edwards (#568) and Stuart Immonen (#569); issues #568–569 are scripted by Joe Ahearne from Millar's plots, 2008–2009) also collected as:
    - World's Greatest (collects #554–561, hc, 200 pages, 2009, ISBN 0-7851-3225-2; tpb, 2009, ISBN 0-7851-2555-8)
    - The Master of Doom (collects #562–569, hc, 248 pages, 2009, ISBN 0-7851-3370-4; tpb, 2010, ISBN 0-7851-2967-7)
  - Marvel 1985 #1–6 (with Tommy Lee Edwards, 2008) also collected as Marvel 1985 (hc, 176 pages, 2009, ISBN 0-7851-2158-7; tpb, 2009, ISBN 0-7851-2159-5)

==== Ultimate Comics ====
- Ultimate X-Men (with Adam and Andy Kubert, Tom Raney (#9), Tom Derenick (#12), Chris Bachalo (#18–19), Kaare Andrews (#23–24), Ben Lai (#26) and David Finch, 2001–2003) collected as:
  - Ultimate Collection: Ultimate X-Men Volume 1 (collects #1–12, hc, 352 pages, 2002, ISBN 0-7851-1008-9; tpb, 2006, ISBN 0-7851-2187-0)
  - Ultimate Collection: Ultimate X-Men Volume 2 (collects #15–25, hc, 336 pages, 2003, ISBN 0-7851-1130-1; tpb, 2007, ISBN 0-7851-2856-5)
  - Ultimate Collection: Ultimate X-Men Volume 3 (collects #26–33, hc, 312 pages, 2003, ISBN 0-7851-1131-X; tpb, 2009, ISBN 0-7851-4187-1)
    - Includes the 4-issue spin-off limited series Ultimate War (written by Millar, art by Chris Bachalo, 2003)
  - Omnibus Volume 1 (includes #1–12, 15–33 and Ultimate War #1–4, hc, 1,024 pages, 2022, ISBN 1-302946-35-8)
- The Ultimates Omnibus (hc, 896 pages, 2009, ISBN 0-7851-3780-7) collects:
  - The Ultimates #1–13 (with Bryan Hitch, 2002–2004) also collected as Ultimate Collection: The Ultimates (hc, 400 pages, 2004, ISBN 0-7851-1082-8; tpb, 2010, ISBN 0-7851-4387-4)
  - The Ultimates 2 #1–13, Annual #1 (with Bryan Hitch and Steve Dillon (Annual), 2005–2007) also collected as Ultimate Collection: The Ultimates 2 (hc, 464 pages, 2007, ISBN 0-7851-2138-2; tpb, 2010, ISBN 0-7851-4916-3)
- Ultimate Fantastic Four (with Adam Kubert, Jae Lee (Annual), Greg Land and Mitch Breitweiser (#29–32); issues #1–6 are co-written by Millar and Brian Michael Bendis, 2004–2006) collected as:
  - Volume 1 (includes #1–6, hc, 320 pages, 2005, ISBN 0-7851-1458-0)
  - Volume 2 (includes Annual #1, hc, 240 pages, 2006, ISBN 0-7851-2058-0)
  - Volume 3 (collects #21–32, hc, 296 pages, 2007, ISBN 0-7851-2603-1)
  - Omnibus Volume 1 (includes #1–6, 21–32 and Annual #1, hc, 856 pages, 2025, ISBN 1-3029-6366-X)
- Ultimate Spider-Man #86–88 + Ultimate X-Men #65 + Ultimate Fantastic Four #25–26: "Visions" (with John Romita, Jr., co-feature, 2006) collected in Ultimate Vision (tpb, 160 pages, 2008, ISBN 0-7851-2173-0)
- Ultimate Comics: Avengers Omnibus (hc, 608 pages, 2012, ISBN 0-7851-6132-5) collects:
  - Ultimate Comics: Avengers #1–6 (with Carlos Pacheco, 2009–2010) also collected as Ultimate Avengers: The Next Generation (hc, 160 pages, 2010, ISBN 0-7851-4010-7; tpb, 2010, ISBN 0-7851-4097-2)
  - Ultimate Comics: Avengers 2 #1–6 (with Leinil Francis Yu, 2010) also collected as Ultimate Avengers: Crime and Punishment (hc, 144 pages, 2010, ISBN 0-7851-3670-3; tpb, 2011, ISBN 0-7851-3671-1)
  - Ultimate Comics: Avengers 3 #1–6 (with Steve Dillon, 2010–2011) also collected as Ultimate Avengers: Blade vs. the Avengers (hc, 152 pages, 2011, ISBN 0-7851-4009-3; tpb, 2011, ISBN 0-7851-4096-4)
  - Ultimate Comics: Avengers vs. New Ultimates #1–6 (with Leinil Francis Yu, 2011) also collected as Ultimate Avengers vs. New Ultimates (hc, 144 pages, 2011, ISBN 0-7851-5272-5; tpb, 2012, ISBN 0-7851-5273-3)

==== Icon Comics ====
- Kick-Ass (with John Romita, Jr.):
  - Kick-Ass #1–8 (2008–2010) collected as Kick-Ass (hc, 192 pages, 2010, ISBN 0-7851-3435-2; tpb, 2010, ISBN 0-7851-3261-9)
  - Kick-Ass 2 #1–7 (2010–2012) collected as Kick-Ass 2 (hc, 208 pages, 2012, ISBN 0-7851-5245-8; tpb, 2013, ISBN 0-7851-5246-6)
  - Hit-Girl #1–5 (2012–2013) collected as Kick-Ass 2 Prelude: Hit-Girl (hc, 136 pages, 2013, ISBN 0-7851-6597-5; tpb, 2013, ISBN 0-7851-6598-3)
  - Kick-Ass 3 #1–8 (2013–2014) collected as Kick-Ass 3 (hc, 232 pages, 2014, ISBN 0-7851-8488-0; tpb, 2015, ISBN 0-7851-8489-9)
- Nemesis #1–4 (with Steve McNiven, 2010–2011) collected as Nemesis (hc, 112 pages, 2011, ISBN 0-7851-4865-5; tpb, 2012, ISBN 0-7851-4866-3)
  - A sequel series entitled Nemesis Returns was announced for September 2012 (later delayed to January, then March/April 2013).
  - The sequel was eventually published in 2023 via Image under the title Nemesis: Reloaded (with Jorge Jiménez replacing McNiven as the artist).
- Superior #1–7 (with Leinil Francis Yu, 2010–2012) collected as Superior (hc, 192 pages, 2012, ISBN 0-7851-3618-5; tpb, 2012, ISBN 0-7851-5317-9)
- Supercrooks #1–4 (scripted by Millar from a plot by Millar and Nacho Vigalondo, art by Leinil Francis Yu, 2012) collected as Supercrooks: The Heist (hc, 128 pages, 2012, ISBN 0-7851-6610-6; tpb, 2013, ISBN 0-7851-6544-4)
  - A sequel entitled Supercrooks: The Bounty Hunter was announced for 2017, along with the sequel for American Jesus. While the latter was eventually published in 2020, Supercrooks: The Bounty Hunter remains unreleased.
- The Secret Service #1–6 (scripted by Millar from a plot by Millar and Matthew Vaughn, art by Dave Gibbons, 2012–2013) collected as The Secret Service: Kingsman (hc, 176 pages, 2014, ISBN 0-7851-6545-2; tpb, 2014, ISBN 0-7851-6546-0)
  - Due to specifics of Millar's deal with Netflix, he is reportedly not allowed to write sequels to any of the titles that were adapted to screen before the deal, such as Wanted, Kick-Ass or Kingsman, despite still owning the rights to them.
  - The next Kingsman release, a six-page short story subtitled "The Big Exit" and published in Playboy #2017–09/10, was written by Rob Williams and drawn by Ozgur Yildirim. It was followed by a sequel limited series:
    - Kingsman: The Red Diamond #1–6 (written by Rob Williams, drawn by Simon Fraser, Image, 2017–2018) collected as Kingsman: The Red Diamond (tpb, 144 pages, 2018, ISBN 1-5343-0509-2)
- Empress #1–7 (with Stuart Immonen, 2016) collected as Empress (hc, 192 pages, 2017, ISBN 1-302-90206-7; tpb, 2017, ISBN 1-302-90207-5)

=== Image Comics ===
- Top Cow:
  - Witchblade: Demon (with Jae Lee, one-shot, 2003)
  - Wanted #1–6 (with J. G. Jones, 2003–2004)
    - Collected by Image as Wanted (hc, 192 pages, 2005, ISBN 1-58240-480-1; tpb, 2005, ISBN 1-58240-497-6)
    - Collected by Dark Horse in Wanted and Big Game: Library Edition (hc, 360 pages, 2024, ISBN 1-5067-4441-9)
- Run (with Ashley Wood, unreleased one-shot connected to the other three inaugural Millarworld launches: Wanted, Chosen and The Unfunnies)
- Liberty Comics #1: "The House of Dracula" (with John Paul Leon, anthology, 2008) collected in CBLDF Presents: Liberty (hc, 216 pages, 2014, ISBN 1-60706-937-7; tpb, 2016, ISBN 1-60706-996-2)
- War Heroes #1–3 (of 6) (with Tony Harris, 2008–2009)
- American Jesus (with Peter Gross):
  - American Jesus: Chosen (collection of the 3-issue limited series Chosen with slight alterations, tpb, 72 pages, 2009, ISBN 1-60706-006-X)
  - American Jesus: The New Messiah #1–3 (2019–2020) collected as American Jesus: The New Messiah (tpb, 96 pages, 2020, ISBN 1-5343-1512-8)
  - American Jesus: Revelation #1–3 (with additional art by Tomm Coker, 2022) collected as American Jesus: Revelation (tpb, 96 pages, 2023, ISBN 1-5343-2499-2)
- Jupiter's Legacy:
  - Jupiter's Legacy Volume 2 (Library Edition (hc), 280 pages, Dark Horse, 2025, ISBN 1-506-74887-2; Omnibus (tpb), 2027, ISBN 1-5067-5522-4) collects:
    - Jupiter's Legacy #1–5 (with Frank Quitely, 2013–2015) also collected as Jupiter's Legacy Book One (tpb, 136 pages, 2015, ISBN 1-63215-310-6)
    - Jupiter's Legacy 2 #1–5 (with Frank Quitely, 2016–2017) also collected as Jupiter's Legacy Book Two (tpb, 136 pages, 2017, ISBN 1-63215-889-2)
  - Jupiter's Legacy Volume 1 (Library Edition (hc), 312 pages, Dark Horse, 2025, ISBN 1-5067-4886-4; Omnibus (tpb), 2026, ISBN 1-5067-5521-6) collects:
    - Jupiter's Circle vol. 1 #1–6 (with Wilfredo Torres and Davide Gianfelice (#4–5), 2015) also collected as Jupiter's Circle Book One (tpb, 144 pages, 2015, ISBN 1-63215-556-7)
    - Jupiter's Circle vol. 2 #1–6 (with Wilfredo Torres, Chris Sprouse (#3–5) and Ty Templeton (#5), 2015–2016) also collected as Jupiter's Circle Book Two (tpb, 152 pages, 2016, ISBN 1-63215-707-1)
  - Jupiter's Legacy: Requiem #1–6 (with Tommy Lee Edwards, 2021) collected as Jupiter's Legacy Volume 5 (tpb, 192 pages, 2022, ISBN 1-5343-2106-3)
    - The series was initially announced to run for 12 issues but the latter part of the story ended up being delayed and shortened to five issues.
    - The remaining issues were eventually published in 2024 under Dark Horse as Jupiter's Legacy: Finale (with Matthew Dow Smith joining Edwards as the artist).
    - Requiem and Finale were collected by Dark Horse in Jupiter's Legacy Volume 3: Library Edition (hc, 360 pages, 2027, ISBN 1-5067-5236-5)
- Starlight #1–6 (with Goran Parlov, 2014)
  - Collected by Image as Starlight: The Return of Duke McQueen (tpb, 152 pages, 2015, ISBN 1-63215-017-4)
  - Collected by Dark Horse as Starlight: Library Edition (hc, 184 pages, 2025, ISBN 1-5067-4894-5)
- MPH #1–5 (with Duncan Fegredo, 2014–2015)
  - Collected by Image as MPH (tpb, 136 pages, 2015, ISBN 1-63215-265-7)
  - Collected by Dark Horse as MPH: Library Edition (hc, 160 pages, 2026, ISBN 1-5067-4925-9)
- Chrononauts (Library Edition (hc), 264 pages, Dark Horse, 2025, ISBN 1-5067-4883-X; Omnibus (tpb), 2026, ISBN 1-5067-5520-8) collects:
  - Chrononauts #1–4 (with Sean Gordon Murphy, 2015) also collected as Chrononauts (tpb, 128 pages, 2015, ISBN 1-63215-406-4)
  - Chrononauts: Futureshock #1–4 (with Eric Canete, 2020) also collected as Chrononauts Volume 2 (tpb, 128 pages, 2020, ISBN 1-5343-1508-X)
- Huck #1–6 (with Rafael Albuquerque, 2015–2016)
  - Collected as Huck: All-American (tpb, 160 pages, 2016, ISBN 1-63215-729-2)
  - Collected alongside its sequel series in Huck: Library Edition (hc, 344 pages, Dark Horse, 2027, ISBN 1-506-74885-6)
- Reborn #1–6 (with Greg Capullo, 2016–2017) collected as Reborn (hc, 176 pages, 2015, ISBN 1-5343-0158-5; tpb, 2018, ISBN 1-5343-0652-8)
- Millarworld Annual (one-shot specials containing winning entries from the online contest for up-and-coming creators held by Millar in 2015 and 2016):
  - Millarworld Annual 2016:
    - "Chrononauts: Prom Night" (written by Shaun Brill, drawn by Conor Hughes)
    - "Kick-Ass: Blindsided" (written by Ricardo Mo, drawn by Ifesinachi Orkiekwe)
    - "American Jesus: Undeath" (written by Cliff Bumgardner, drawn by Steve Beach)
    - "Kingsman: Mum's the Word" (written by Phillip Huxley, drawn by Myron Macklin)
    - "Starlight: Duke McQueen's Greatest Adventure" (written by Deniz Camp, drawn by Pracheta Banerjee)
    - "Hit-Girl: Mindy's ABCs" (written by Mark Abnett, drawn by Ozgur Yildirim)
  - Millarworld New Talent Annual 2017:
    - "Kick-Ass: Trick or Cheat" (written by Emma Sayle, drawn by Edgy Ziane)
    - "Empress: Rulebook" (written by Will McLaren, drawn by Luana Vecchio)
    - "Nemesis: We are Nemesis" (written by Steve Lawrence, drawn by Marcelo Salazo)
    - "Superior: Symptoms" (written by Simon James, drawn by Alex Aguilar)
    - "Supercrooks: The Anniversary" (written by Martin Renart, drawn by Robert Carey)
    - "Huck: Home Sweet Huck" (written by Stephanie Cooke, drawn by Jake Elphick)
- Kick-Ass:
  - Kick-Ass vol. 2 #1–6 (with John Romita, Jr., 2018) collected as Kick-Ass – The New Girl Book One (tpb, 160 pages, 2018, ISBN 1-5343-0832-6)
    - The rest of the series, written by Steve Niles and drawn by Marcelo Frusin, is collected as:
      - Kick-Ass – The New Girl Book Two (collects #7–12, tpb, 152 pages, 2019, ISBN 1-5343-1064-9)
      - Kick-Ass – The New Girl Book Three (collects #13–18, tpb, 152 pages, 2019, ISBN 1-5343-1349-4)
      - Kick-Ass – The New Girl Book Four (collects Kick-Ass vs. Hit-Girl #1–5, tpb, 128 pages, 2021, ISBN 1-5343-1708-2)
  - Hit-Girl vol. 2 #1–4: "Colombia" (with Ricardo López Ortiz, 2018) collected as Hit-Girl in Colombia (tpb, 112 pages, 2018, ISBN 1-5343-0809-1)
    - Issues #5–8, written by Jeff Lemire and drawn by Eduardo Risso, are collected as Hit-Girl in Canada (tpb, 104 pages, 2018, ISBN 1-5343-0981-0)
    - Issues #9–12, co-written by Rafael Albuquerque with Rafael Scavone and drawn by Albuquerque, are collected as Hit-Girl in Rome (tpb, 104 pages, 2019, ISBN 1-5343-1039-8)
      - Issues #1–4 of Hit-Girl: Season Two, written by Kevin Smith and drawn by Pernille Ørum, are collected as Hit-Girl in Hollywood (tpb, 112 pages, 2019, ISBN 1-5343-1225-0)
      - Issues #5–8 of Hit-Girl: Season Two, written by Daniel Way and drawn by Goran Parlov, are collected as Hit-Girl in Hong Kong (tpb, 112 pages, 2019, ISBN 1-5343-1407-5)
      - Issues #9–12 of Hit-Girl: Season Two, written by Peter Milligan and drawn by Alison Sampson, are collected as Hit-Girl in India (tpb, 104 pages, 2020, ISBN 1-5343-1548-9)
- Where We Live: A Benefit for the Survivors in Las Vegas: "Why Here?" (with Alex Sheikman, anthology graphic novel, 336 pages, 2018, ISBN 1-5343-0822-9)
- The Magic Order:
  - The Magic Order Volume 1 (Library Edition (hc), 376 pages, Dark Horse, 2025, ISBN 1-5067-4440-0; Omnibus (tpb), 2026, ISBN 1-506-75527-5) collects:
    - The Magic Order #1–6 (with Olivier Coipel, 2018–2019) also collected as The Magic Order (tpb, 176 pages, 2019, ISBN 1-5343-0871-7)
    - The Magic Order 2 #1–6 (with Stuart Immonen, 2021–2022) also collected as The Magic Order Volume 2 (tpb, 168 pages, 2022, ISBN 1-5343-2220-5)
  - The Magic Order Volume 2: Library Edition (hc, 512 pages, Dark Horse, 2026, ISBN 1-5067-4898-8) includes:
    - The Magic Order 3 #1–6 (with Gigi Cavenago, 2022) also collected as The Magic Order Volume 3 (tpb, 176 pages, 2023, ISBN 1-5343-2469-0)
    - The Magic Order 4 #1–6 (with Dike Ruan, 2023) also collected as The Magic Order Volume 4 (tpb, 176 pages, 2023, ISBN 1-5343-9982-8)
  - The fifth and last volume of the series was published under Dark Horse.
- Prodigy (Library Edition (hc), 480 pages, Dark Horse, 2026, ISBN 1-5067-4890-2; Omnibus (tpb), 2027, ISBN 1-5067-5524-0) includes:
  - Prodigy #1–6 (with Rafael Albuquerque, 2018–2019) also collected as Prodigy: The Evil Earth (tpb, 168 pages, 2019, ISBN 1-5343-1236-6)
  - Prodigy: The Icarus Society #1–5 (with Matteo Buffagni, 2022) also collected as Prodigy: The Icarus Society (tpb, 152 pages, 2023, ISBN 1-5343-2455-0)
- Sharkey the Bounty Hunter #1–6 (with Simone Bianchi, 2019) collected as Sharkey the Bounty Hunter (tpb, 160 pages, 2019, ISBN 1-5343-1366-4)
- Space Bandits #1–5 (with Matteo Scalera, 2019) collected as Space Bandits (tpb, 152 pages, 2020, ISBN 1-5343-1501-2)
- King of Spies #1–4 (with Matteo Scalera, 2021–2022)
  - Collected by Image as King of Spies (tpb, 128 pages, 2022, ISBN 1-5343-2212-4)
  - Collected by Dark Horse as King of Spies: Library Edition (hc, 152 pages, 2025, ISBN 1-5067-4888-0)
- Night Club #1–6 (with Juanan Ramírez, 2022–2023) collected as Night Club (tpb, 176 pages, 2023, ISBN 1-5343-9991-7)
- Nemesis: Reloaded #1–5 (with Jorge Jiménez, 2023)
  - Collected as Nemesis: Reloaded (tpb, 144 pages, 2023, ISBN 1-5343-9990-9)
  - Collected alongside its sequel series in The Complete Nemesis Collection (hc, 616 pages, 2026, ISBN 1-5067-4438-9)
- The Ambassadors #1–6 (with Frank Quitely (#1), Karl Kerschl (#2), Travis Charest (#3), Olivier Coipel (#4), Matteo Buffagni (#5) and Matteo Scalera (#6), 2023)
  - Collected by Image as The Ambassadors (tpb, 184 pages, 2023, ISBN 1-5343-9981-X)
  - Collected by Dark Horse as The Ambassadors: Library Edition (hc, 216 pages, 2024, ISBN 1-506-74439-7)
- Big Game #1–5 (with Pepe Larraz, 2023) collected as Big Game (tpb, 152 pages, 2023, ISBN 1-5343-9911-9)
  - Also collected by Dark Horse in Wanted and Big Game: Library Edition (hc, 360 pages, 2024, ISBN 1-5067-4441-9)
  - Also collected by Dark Horse in The Complete Nemesis Collection (hc, 616 pages, 2026, ISBN 1-5067-4438-9)

=== Dark Horse Comics ===
- Chosen #1–3 (with Peter Gross, 2004) collected as Chosen (tpb, 96 pages, 2005, ISBN 1-59307-213-9)
  - Between 2019 and 2022, two sequel limited series were published via Image under the title American Jesus.
  - All three volumes were collected as American Jesus: Library Edition (hc, 264 pages, 2027, ISBN 1-5067-4897-X)
- The Complete Nemesis Collection (hc, 616 pages, 2026, ISBN 1-5067-4438-9) includes:
  - Nemesis: Rogues' Gallery #1–5 (with Valerio Giangiordano, 2024–2025) also collected as Nemesis: Rogues' Gallery (tpb, 144 pages, 2025, ISBN 1-5067-4487-7)
  - Nemesis Forever #1–5 (with Matteo Scalera, 2025–2026) also collected as Nemesis Forever (tpb, 152 pages, 2026, ISBN 1-5067-5065-6)
- Night Club 2 #1–6 (with Juanan Ramírez, 2024–2025) collected as Night Club Volume 2 (tpb, 160 pages, 2025, ISBN 1-5067-4488-5)
- Prodigy: Slaves of Mars #1–5 (with Stefano Landini, 2024–2025)
  - Collected as Prodigy: Slaves of Mars (tpb, 144 pages, 2025, ISBN 1-5067-4489-3)
  - Collected alongside its prequel series in Prodigy (Library Edition (hc), 480 pages, 2026, ISBN 1-5067-4890-2; Omnibus (tpb), 2027, ISBN 1-5067-5524-0)
- The Magic Order 5 #1–6 (with Matteo Buffagni, 2024–2025)
  - Collected as The Magic Order Volume 5 (tpb, 160 pages, 2025, ISBN 1-5067-4490-7)
  - Collected along with the preceding volumes in The Magic Order Volume 2: Library Edition (hc, 512 pages, 2026, ISBN 1-5067-4898-8)
- Jupiter's Legacy: Finale #1–5 (with Tommy Lee Edwards (#1–2), Matthew Dow Smith (#3) and Lee Carter (#4–5), 2024–2025)
  - Collected as Jupiter's Legacy Volume 6 (tpb, 144 pages, 2025, ISBN 1-5067-4484-2)
  - Collected in Jupiter's Legacy Volume 3: Library Edition (hc, 360 pages, 2027, ISBN 1-5067-5236-5)
- Vatican City #1–3 (with Per Berg, 2025) collected as Vatican City (tpb, 104 pages, 2025, ISBN 1-5067-5071-0)
- Huck: Big Bad World #1–6 (with Rafael Albuquerque, 2025)
  - Collected as Huck: Big Bad World (tpb, 168 pages, 2026, ISBN 1-5067-5064-8)
  - Collected alongside its prequel series in Huck: Library Edition (hc, 344 pages, 2027, ISBN 1-506-74885-6)
- Star-Crossed #1–5 (with Corrado Mastantuono, 2026) collected as Star-Crossed (tpb, 152 pages, 2027, ISBN 1-5067-5067-2)

=== Other US publishers ===
- Vampirella (Harris):
  - Vampirella: The Morrison/Millar Collection (tpb, 176 pages, 2006, ISBN 0-910692-93-9) collects:
    - Vampirella Strikes #6: "A Cold Day in Hell!" (with Louis Small, Jr., anthology, 1996)
    - "Ascending Evil" (co-written by Millar and Grant Morrison, art by Amanda Conner, in Vampirella Monthly #1–3, 1997)
    - "Holy War" (co-plotted by Millar and Grant Morrison; written by Steven Grant, drawn by Louis Small, Jr., in Vampirella Monthly #4–6, 1997)
  - "The Queen's Gambit" (co-plotted by Millar and Grant Morrison; written by Steven Grant, drawn by Amanda Conner, in Vampirella Monthly #7–9, 1997)
  - Vampirella vs. Pantha (with Mark Texeira, one-shot, 1997) collected in Vampirella Presents: Tales of Pantha (tpb, 128 pages, 2006, ISBN 0-910692-89-0)
  - Vampirella vol. 2 #1–3: "Nowheresville" (with Mike Mayhew, 2001) collected as Vampirella: Nowheresville (tpb, 96 pages, 2002, ISBN 0-910692-99-8)
- Youngblood: Bloodsport #1 (of 3/4) (with Rob Liefeld, Arcade, 2003; issue #2 was partially released as Bootleg at Wizard World Los Angeles 2005)
- The Unfunnies #1–4 (with Anthony Williams, Avatar, 2004–2007)
- Love is Love (untitled two-page story, with Piotr Kowalski, anthology graphic novel, 144 pages, IDW Publishing, 2016, ISBN 1-63140-939-5)

== Adaptations of Millar's work ==
=== Film ===
Year	Title	Director(s)	Studio(s)	Based on	Budget	Box office	Rotten Tomatoes
Year	Title	Director(s)	Studio(s)	Based on	USD$		Rotten Tomatoes
2008	Wanted	Timur Bekmambetov	Universal Studios	Wanted by Millar and J. G. Jones	$75 million	$341,433,252	71%
2010	Kick-Ass	Matthew Vaughn	Lionsgate Films; Universal Studios; Marv Films; Plan B Entertainment	Kick-Ass by Millar and John Romita, Jr.	$30 million	$96,188,903	76%
2013	Kick-Ass 2	Jeff Wadlow	Universal Studios; Marv Films; Plan B Entertainment	Kick-Ass 2 and Hit-Girl by Millar and John Romita, Jr.	$28 million	$60,795,985	29%
2014	Kingsman: The Secret Service	Matthew Vaughn	20th Century Fox; Marv Films	The Secret Service by Millar and Dave Gibbons	$81 million	$413,998,123	73%
2016	Captain America: Civil War	Anthony and Joe Russo	Marvel Studios; Walt Disney Studios; Motion Pictures	Civil War by Millar and Steve McNiven	$250 million	$1.132 billion	91%
2017	Logan	James Mangold	20th Century Fox; Marvel Entertainment; The Donner's Company	Old Man Logan by Millar and Steve McNiven	$97 million	$616.8 million	93%
2017	Kingsman: The Golden Circle	Matthew Vaughn	20th Century Fox; Marv Films	The Secret Service by Millar and Dave Gibbons	$104 million	$410.8 million	52%
2020	Superman: Red Son	Sam Liu	Warner Bros. Animation; DC Entertainment	Superman: Red Son by Millar, Dave Johnson and Kilian Plunkett			89%
2021	The King's Man	Matthew Vaughn	20th Century Fox; Marv Films	The Secret Service by Millar and Dave Gibbons	$100 million	$125.9 million	43%

=== Television ===
Year	Title	Showrunner(s)	Studio(s)	Based on	Rotten Tomatoes						
Year	Title	Showrunner(s)	Studio(s)	Based on	Rotten Tomatoes	2021	Jupiter's Legacy	Steven S. DeKnight; Sang Kyu Kim	Netflix; Di Bonaventura Pictures	Jupiter's Legacy by Millar and Frank Quitely	41%
2021	Super Crooks	Motonobu Hori	Netflix; Studio Bones	Supercrooks by Millar and Leinil Francis Yu	100%						
2023	The Chosen One	Everardo Gout	Netflix	American Jesus by Millar and Peter Gross	75%						

Preceded by Dick Foreman	Swamp Thing writer 1994–1996 (with Grant Morrison in 1994)	Succeeded by Brian K. Vaughan
Preceded by Mark Waid; Brian Augustyn	The Flash writer 1997–1998 (with Grant Morrison)	Succeeded by Mark Waid; Brian Augustyn
Preceded by Scott McCloud	Superman Adventures writer 1998–2001	Succeeded by Mark Evanier
Preceded by Warren Ellis	The Authority writer 2000–2002	Succeeded by Robbie Morrison
Preceded by n/a	Ultimate X-Men writer 2001–2003	Succeeded by Brian Michael Bendis
Preceded by n/a	The Ultimates writer 2002–2007	Succeeded by Jeph Loeb
Preceded by Alan Moore	Youngblood writer 2003	Succeeded by Kurt Busiek; Brandon Thomas
Preceded by n/a	Ultimate Fantastic Four writer 2004 (with Brian Michael Bendis)	Succeeded by Warren Ellis
Preceded by Greg Rucka	Wolverine writer 2004–2005	Succeeded by Daniel Way
Preceded by Warren Ellis	Ultimate Fantastic Four writer 2005–2006	Succeeded by Mike Carey
Preceded by Dwayne McDuffie	Fantastic Four writer 2008–2009 (with Joe Ahearne in 2009)	Succeeded by Jonathan Hickman
Preceded by Jason Aaron	Wolverine writer 2008–2009	Succeeded by Jason Aaron
