= The Unfunnies =

Comic book limited series

- Cover of the 1st issue.

Publication information
- Schedule: Irregular
- Format: Limited series
- Genre: Black comedy; Horror
- Publication date: January 2004 – October 2007
- No. of issues: 4

Creative team
- Created by: Mark Millar; Anthony Williams
- Written by: Mark Millar
- Artist: Anthony Williams
- Letterer: John Layman
- Colorist: Anthony Williams
- Editor: William A. Christensen

The Unfunnies is a four-issue adult comedy horror comic book mini-series created by Mark Millar and Anthony Williams and published by Avatar Press.

The comic uses cartoon characters drawn in a simple style similar to Hanna-Barbera and photographs to tell the story of a comic world gone wrong. The plot intertwines several storylines that eventually meet in the end.

== Publication history ==
The Unfunnies was one of the launch titles for Millarworld, the umbrella brand that the creator-owned works of Mark Millar were marketed under beginning in 2004. After being rejected by multiple publishers, Millar had Avatar Press release the book, as the company was the only one to not object to the transgressive content of the series, which Millar described as being "a very dark, multi-charactered story (along the lines of Magnolia) with funny animals" that he had decided to write after "tapping into that whole Happiness vibe I've been dying to utilize since I saw my first Todd Solondz movie."

Anthony Williams was selected by Millar to illustrate the title due to Williams's past experience in the animation industry, which Millar believed would allow Williams to render the intended Hanna-Barbera-based cartoon art style that was to clash with the story's grim subject matter in a manner comparable to "It's A Wonderful Life Part 2 starring all the same people as the original or The Little Mermaid 3 animated in exactly the same style, but the opening scene had Ariel's dad busted for child molestation or James Stewart sneaking into a mortuary for a little skull-fucking." Millar expressed dissatisfaction with Williams' initial artwork, and instructed him to "make it shittier."

By Millar's own account, when he gave a copy of the first issue to his wife, she read the first six pages of it, and then threw the book back at him while calling it "the most horrible thing she'd ever read in her life" as he frantically attempted to explain to her that "the crow was sucking cock for a REASON."

Issues #1 and #2 were released in 2004 and then re-released in 2007 together in a compilation titled The First Follies. Issues #3 and #4 were also released in 2007. Each installment had two covers: a mass-market version and an "Offensive" variant.

The title is wholly absent from the Millarworld art book as well as the line's official website. When reached for comment by Bleeding Cool, both Avatar Press editor-in-chief William A. Christensen and art book publisher Image Comics claimed that Millar had never mentioned including The Unfunnies in either. Millar and Williams also both failed to respond to any of Bleeding Cool's queries relating to the apparent "excommunication" of The Unfunnies from their bibliographies.

== Plot synopsis ==
The story starts with the Crow family sitting down about to watch television. Suddenly the police come through the door and arrest Moe the Crow for possession of child pornography. As the story progresses, it is revealed that crime and depravity have gone up in this world and no one can explain why. Moe tells his wife, Birdseed Betty, while she is visiting him in jail, that he does not understand what is happening but that he had been getting mysterious e-mails from a stranger, Troy Hicks, who had been tempting him with the child porn and a final offer to trade places with him in his world, which Moe refused to do.

As the story continues, more and more of the characters find themselves in situations that they do not understand, and Sheriff Dribble is on the hunt to find out why. After discovering that there is a connection between the recent events and a penguin named Frosty Pete, Sheriff Dribble and his force confront Pete at the church.

Frosty Pete tells the cops that they cannot stop him, because he is really Troy Hicks, and he has been controlling the world this whole time. In his world, Hicks was a cartoonist who drew a comic strip called "The Funnies". Hicks was charged with eight child murders while his wife wanted a child and had turned to prostitution after his arrest. He explains to Sheriff Dribble that after his final appeal was rejected, he decided to start drawing his world again in an attempt to stay alive forever and do whatever he wanted in the new world without consequences. He e-mailed all his characters figuring that at least one of them would bite if he gave enough temptation of sex and women in his world, which Frosty Pete accepted (thus Hicks' current form as Frosty Pete). Hicks then demonstrates his new power by stopping the bullets fired at him and killing the police force.

As the comic ends, Frosty Pete, now in Hicks' body, is about to be led to the electric chair, while Hicks, after killing off or seriously harming various characters in quick succession, walks off with Sally Gator's baby in the stroller.

== Characters ==
Moe the Crow – a cartoon crow. Married to Birdseed Betty, has two kids Timmy and Molly. He is arrested and jailed for possession of child pornography (provided to him by Troy Hicks). Becomes a prison “bitch” to the other inmates. Is eventually raped in prison by a bulldog with AIDS.

Birdseed Betty – a cartoon crow. After Moe is sent to jail, Betty turns to prostitution. Kills her landlord after he suggests having sex with her kids, as well. Becomes a Christian and leaves Moe after receiving a mysterious inheritance, but is killed by a weight in the end by Troy Hicks/Frosty Pete.

Sheriff Dribble – a cartoon cop. Is investigating the sudden appearance of Troy Hicks and the deaths of the children in the world. Dribble is stabbed to death by Troy Hicks/Frosty Pete.

Jungle Jim – a cartoon lemur. Landlord to Moe the Crow and Birdseed Betty. Becomes Birdseed Betty’s first client in order for her to stay in the house. Is killed by Birdseed Betty.

Pussywhisker – a cartoon panther. Out of work actor. Married to Polly. Loses both his testicles after being convinced by Dr. Despicable that he has cancer. Is forced by Polly to find a sperm donor so they can have a child. Polly later reveals that she orchestrated her husband's castration so that she would be justified in her acts of adultery with copious partners, and enjoys that she has forced her husband to find these partners while she waits at home.

Dr. Despicable – a cartoon doctor. Convinces his patients to do things they wouldn’t normally do.

Sally Gator – a cartoon alligator. Is convinced by Dr. Despicable to have a “medical termination” of her ten-year-old daughter Allie Gator and have another child to “replace” her. Sally's baby is last seen being pushed in the carriage by Troy Hicks/Frosty Pete.

Chick-Chick Chickie – a cartoon chick. Foul mouthed to all the adults, but it is later revealed that he is being forced to do so by Troy Hicks/Frosty Pete. Is killed by Troy Hicks/Frosty Pete.

Legal Beagle – a cartoon beagle. Lawyer. Becomes a client of Birdseed Betty.

Troy Hicks – Cartoonist. Creator of the cartoon world and controls everything in the world. Child molester and child killer. On Death Row for the deaths of 8 children after his final appeal is rejected. Starts drawing his cartoon world again when in prison and uses it as a gateway to live forever. E-mails his creations and tempts them with stories of sex and porn, in an attempt to make it over into the cartoon world, talks Frosty Pete into going along with the plan. Is last seen walking off with Sally Gator’s new baby.
