= American Jesus (comics) =

Comics by Mark Millar and Peter Gross

American Jesus is a comic book series written by Mark Millar and illustrated by Peter Gross, Tomm Coker, and Jodie Muir. The first volume of the series, Chosen, was published by Dark Horse Comics, and the second and third volumes, The New Messiah and Revelation, by Image Comics, as well as crossover references in Big Game. Set in the Millarworld, the series chronicles the rise of the Antichrist Jodie Christianson, as the reincarnated Christ Catalina rises to oppose him.

A six-episode television adaptation of the first volume, The Chosen One, was released on Netflix on August 16, 2023.

== Background ==
The series debuted in 2004 and was the second series in the Millarworld, however, the series wasn't completed until 2023. The series was origianally titled Chosen and was retitled American Jesus for the trade paperback. The Chosen series was also published by Dark Horse Comics while American Jesus was published by Image Comics.

Millar is a practising Catholic and intended for Christians to be part of the audience for the series. Two priests wrote afterwords for the series.

== Plot ==
The protagonist is a young boy named Jodie Christianson who discovers he has christ-like powers after surviving an accident. The story is set in the suburbs of Peoria, Illinois. Jodie later turns out to be the antichrist, and a woman named Catalina is the actual second coming of Jesus. Catalina is introduced in the sequel miniseries American Jesus: The New Messiah.

== Reception ==
Writing in Under the Radar Magazine, Kyle Lemmon gave the book a 7/10 rating, noting the use of "clever artistic elements". Hilary Goldstein praised the series in IGN noting that it isn't heavy-handed and "does not take any cheap shots at religion".

== Collected editions ==
Title	Material collected	Format	No. of pages	Publication date	ISBN
Book 1: American Jesus: Chosen	Chosen #1–3	Trade paperback	72	2009	ISBN 1-60706-006-X
CLiNT	CLiNT #1–15 (featuring serializations Kick-Ass 2 (#1–15), Nemesis (#1–5), American Jesus (#2–7) and Superior (#6–15)	Trade paperback	—N/a	2010–2012	—N/a
Book 2: The New Messiah	American Jesus: The New Messiah #1–3	Trade paperback	96	2019–2020	ISBN 1-5343-1512-8
Crossover: Big Game	Big Game #1–5	Trade paperback	—N/a	2023	ISBN 1-5343-9911-9
Book 3: Revelation	American Jesus: Revelation #1–3	Trade paperback	96	2022–2023	ISBN 1-5343-2499-2

== In other media ==
In 2009, Matthew Vaughn's Marv Films optioned American Jesus for a film adaptation, with Waypoint Entertainment taking over the optioning in 2016. Ultimately, a six-episode television adaptation of the first volume, The Chosen One, was released on Netflix on August 16, 2023.
